= List of co-princes of Andorra =

This is a list of co-princes of Andorra. For further information on the origin and development of the unique Andorran monarchical system, together with details concerning the powers and prerogatives of the Andorran co-princes, see the article Co-princes of Andorra.

== List of co-princes of Andorra ==
Episcopal Co-Prince			French Co-Prince		
Portrait	Name (Birth–Death)	Tenure	Portrait	Name (Birth–Death)	Tenure
Bishop of Urgell			Count of Foix House of Foix		
	Pere d'Urtx (died 1293)	1278–1293		Roger-Bernard III (1243–1302)	1278–1302
	Guillem de Montcada (died 1308)	1295–1308		Roger-Bernard III (1243–1302)	1278–1302
	Guillem de Montcada (died 1308)	1295–1308	Count of Foix House of Foix-Béarn		
	Guillem de Montcada (died 1308)	1295–1308		Gaston I (1287–1315)	1302–1315
	Ramon Trebaylla (died 1326)	1309–1326		Gaston I (1287–1315)	1302–1315
	Ramon Trebaylla (died 1326)	1309–1326		Gaston II (1308–1343)	1315–1343
	Arnau de Llordà (died 1346)	1326–1341		Gaston II (1308–1343)	1315–1343
	Pere de Narbona (died 1347)	1341–1347		Gaston II (1308–1343)	1315–1343
	Pere de Narbona (died 1347)	1341–1347		Gaston III (1331–1391)	1343–1391
	Nicola Capocci (died 1368)	1348–1350		Gaston III (1331–1391)	1343–1391
	Hugó Desbach (died 1361)	1351–1361		Gaston III (1331–1391)	1343–1391
	Guillem Arnau de Patau (died 1364)	1362–1364		Gaston III (1331–1391)	1343–1391
	Pedro Martínez de Luna (1328–1423)	1365–1370		Gaston III (1331–1391)	1343–1391
	Berenguer d'Erill i de Pallars (died 1388)	1370–1387		Gaston III (1331–1391)	1343–1391
	Galcerand de Vilanova (died 1415)	1388–1396		Gaston III (1331–1391)	1343–1391
	Galcerand de Vilanova (died 1415)	1388–1396		Matthew (1363–1398)	1391–1396
Andorra was briefly annexed to the Crown of Aragon in 1396.
Bishop of Urgell			Count of Foix House of Foix-Béarn		
	Galcerand de Vilanova (died 1415)	1396–1415		Matthew (1363–1398)	1396–1398
	Galcerand de Vilanova (died 1415)	1396–1415		Isabella (died 1428)	1398–1413
	Galcerand de Vilanova (died 1415)	1396–1415	Count of Foix House of Foix-Grailly		
	Galcerand de Vilanova (died 1415)	1396–1415		John I (1382–1436)	1413–1436
	Francesc de Tovia (died 1436)	1415–1436		John I (1382–1436)	1413–1436
	Arnau Roger de Pallars (1408–1461)	1436–1461		Gaston IV (1422–1472)	1436–1472
	Jaume Cardona (1405–1466)	1461–1466		Gaston IV (1422–1472)	1436–1472
	Roderic de Borja i Escrivà (1431-1503)	1467–1472		Gaston IV (1422–1472)	1436–1472
	Roderic de Borja i Escrivà (1431-1503)	1467–1472		Francis Phoebus (1467–1483)	1472–1479
	Pedro Folc de Cardona (died 1530)	1472–1512		Francis Phoebus (1467–1483)	1472–1479
	Pedro Folc de Cardona (died 1530)	1472–1512	King of Navarre House of Foix-Grailly		
	Pedro Folc de Cardona (died 1530)	1472–1512		Francis Phoebus (1467–1483)	1479–1483
	Pedro Folc de Cardona (died 1530)	1472–1512		Catherine (1468–1517)	1483–1512
Andorra was briefly annexed to the Crown of Aragon in 1512–1513.
Bishop of Urgell			King of Navarre House of Foix-Grailly		
	Pedro Folc de Cardona (died 1530)	1513–1515		Catherine (1468–1517)	1513–1517
	Joan Despés (died 1530)	1515–1530		Catherine (1468–1517)	1513–1517
	Joan Despés (died 1530)	1515–1530	King of Navarre House of Albret		
	Joan Despés (died 1530)	1515–1530		Henry II (1503–1555)	1517–1555
	Pedro Jordà de Urríes (died 1533)	1532–1533		Henry II (1503–1555)	1517–1555
	Francisco de Urríes (died 1551)	1534–1551		Henry II (1503–1555)	1517–1555
	Miquel Despuig (died 1559)	1552–1556		Henry II (1503–1555)	1517–1555
	Miquel Despuig (died 1559)	1552–1556		Jeanne d'Albret (1528–1572)	1555–1572
	Joan Pérez García de Oliván (died 1560)	1556–1560		Jeanne d'Albret (1528–1572)	1555–1572
	Pere de Castellet (died 1571)	1561–1571		Jeanne d'Albret (1528–1572)	1555–1572
	Joan Dimas Loris (died 1598)	1572–1576	King of Navarre House of Bourbon		
	Joan Dimas Loris (died 1598)	1572–1576		Henry III; Henry IV of France since 1589 (1553–1610)	1572–1610
	Miquel Jeroni Morell (1531–1579)	1578–1579		Henry III; Henry IV of France since 1589 (1553–1610)	1572–1610
	Hugó Ambrós de Montcada (died 1586)	1580–1586		Henry III; Henry IV of France since 1589 (1553–1610)	1572–1610
	Andreu Capella (1529–1609)	1588–1609		Henry III; Henry IV of France since 1589 (1553–1610)	1572–1610
	Bernat de Salbà i de Salbà	1610–1620		Louis II; Louis XIII of France (1601–1643)	1610–1620
	Luís Díes Aux de Armendáriz (died 1627)	1622–1627	King of France House of Bourbon		
	Luís Díes Aux de Armendáriz (died 1627)	1622–1627		Louis XIII (1601–1643)	1620–1643
	Antonio Pérez (1562–1637)	1627–1633		Louis XIII (1601–1643)	1620–1643
	Pau Duran (1582–1651)	1634–1651		Louis XIII (1601–1643)	1620–1643
	Pau Duran (1582–1651)	1634–1651		Louis XIV (1638–1715)	1643–1715
	Juan Manuel de Espinosa (1597–1679)	1655–1663		Louis XIV (1638–1715)	1643–1715
	Melcior Palau i Boscà (1600–1670)	1664–1670		Louis XIV (1638–1715)	1643–1715
	Pere de Copons i de Teixidor (1620–1681)	1670–1681		Louis XIV (1638–1715)	1643–1715
	Joan Desbach Martorell (1617–1688)	1682–1688		Louis XIV (1638–1715)	1643–1715
	Oleguer de Montserrat Rufet (1626–1694)	1689–1694		Louis XIV (1638–1715)	1643–1715
	Julià Cano Thebar (1645–1719)	1695–1714		Louis XIV (1638–1715)	1643–1715
	Simeó de Guinda y Apeztegui (1660–1737)	1714–1737		Louis XIV (1638–1715)	1643–1715
	Simeó de Guinda y Apeztegui (1660–1737)	1714–1737		Louis XV (1710–1774)	1715–1774
	Jordi Curado y Torreblanca (1682–1749)	1738–1747		Louis XV (1710–1774)	1715–1774
	Sebastià de Victoria Emparán y Loyola (1683–1756)	1747–1756		Louis XV (1710–1774)	1715–1774
	Francesc Josep Catalán de Ocón (1701–1762)	1757–1762		Louis XV (1710–1774)	1715–1774
	Francesc Fernández de Xátiva y Contreras (1704–1771)	1763–1771		Louis XV (1710–1774)	1715–1774
	Joaquín de Santiyán y Valdivieso (1733–1783)	1771–1779		Louis XV (1710–1774)	1715–1774
	Joaquín de Santiyán y Valdivieso (1733–1783)	1771–1779		Louis XVI (1754–1793)	1774–1792
	Juan de García y Montenegro (1716–1783)	1780–1783		Louis XVI (1754–1793)	1774–1792
	Josep de Boltas (1738–1795)	1785–1795		Louis XVI (1754–1793)	1774–1792
	Josep de Boltas (1738–1795)	1785–1795	French First Republic		
	Josep de Boltas (1738–1795)	1785–1795	France renounces the position of co-prince.		1793–1806
	Francesc Antoni de la Dueña y Cisneros (1753–1821)	1797–1812	France renounces the position of co-prince.		1793–1806
	Francesc Antoni de la Dueña y Cisneros (1753–1821)	1797–1812	Emperor of the French House of Bonaparte		
	Francesc Antoni de la Dueña y Cisneros (1753–1821)	1797–1812		Napoleon I (1769–1821)	1806–1812
Andorra was briefly annexed to the First French Empire from 1812 to 1813.
Bishop of Urgell			King of France House of Bourbon		
	Francesc Antoni de la Dueña y Cisneros (1753–1821)	1814–1816		Louis XVIII (1755–1824)	1814–1815
	Francesc Antoni de la Dueña y Cisneros (1753–1821)	1814–1816	Emperor of the French House of Bonaparte		
	Francesc Antoni de la Dueña y Cisneros (1753–1821)	1814–1816		Napoleon I (1769–1821)	1815
	Francesc Antoni de la Dueña y Cisneros (1753–1821)	1814–1816	King of France House of Bourbon		
	Francesc Antoni de la Dueña y Cisneros (1753–1821)	1814–1816		Louis XVIII (1755–1824)	1815–1824
	Bernat Francés Caballero i Mathet (1774–1843)	1817–1824		Louis XVIII (1755–1824)	1815–1824
	Bonifacio López Pulido (1774–1827)	1824–1827		Charles X (1757–1836)	1824–1830
	Simó de Guardiola y Hortoneda (1773–1851)	1827–1851		Charles X (1757–1836)	1824–1830
	Simó de Guardiola y Hortoneda (1773–1851)	1827–1851	King of the French House of Orléans		
	Simó de Guardiola y Hortoneda (1773–1851)	1827–1851		Louis Philippe I (1773–1850)	1830–1848
	Simó de Guardiola y Hortoneda (1773–1851)	1827–1851	President of France Second Republic		
	Simó de Guardiola y Hortoneda (1773–1851)	1827–1851		Louis-Napoleon Bonaparte (1808–1873)	1848–1852
	Josep Caixal i Estradé (1803–1879)	1853–1879	Emperor of the French House of Bonaparte		
	Josep Caixal i Estradé (1803–1879)	1853–1879		Napoleon III (1808–1873)	1852–1870
	Josep Caixal i Estradé (1803–1879)	1853–1879	President of France Third Republic		
	Josep Caixal i Estradé (1803–1879)	1853–1879		Adolphe Thiers (1797–1877)	1871–1873
	Josep Caixal i Estradé (1803–1879)	1853–1879		Patrice de MacMahon (1808–1893)	1873–1879
	Josep Caixal i Estradé (1803–1879)	1853–1879		Jules Grévy (1807–1891)	1879–1887
	Salvador Casañas y Pagés (1834–1908)	1879–1901		Jules Grévy (1807–1891)	1879–1887
	Salvador Casañas y Pagés (1834–1908)	1879–1901		Sadi Carnot (1837–1894)	1887–1894
	Salvador Casañas y Pagés (1834–1908)	1879–1901		Jean Casimir-Perier (1847–1907)	1894–1895
	Salvador Casañas y Pagés (1834–1908)	1879–1901		Félix Faure (1841–1899)	1895–1899
	Salvador Casañas y Pagés (1834–1908)	1879–1901		Émile Loubet (1838–1929)	1899–1906
	Ramon Riu i Cabanes (1852–1901)	1901		Émile Loubet (1838–1929)	1899–1906
	Toribio Martín Barranco; Apostolic Administrator	1902		Émile Loubet (1838–1929)	1899–1906
	Joan Josep Laguarda i Fenollera (1866–1913)	1902–1906		Émile Loubet (1838–1929)	1899–1906
	Joan Josep Laguarda i Fenollera (1866–1913)	1902–1906		Armand Fallières (1841–1931)	1906–1913
	Josep Pujargimzú; Apostolic Administrator	1907		Armand Fallières (1841–1931)	1906–1913
	Juan Benlloch i Vivó (1864–1926)	1907–1919		Armand Fallières (1841–1931)	1906–1913
	Juan Benlloch i Vivó (1864–1926)	1907–1919		Raymond Poincaré (1860–1934)	1913–1920
	Jaume Viladrich i Gaspa (1865–1926); Apostolic Administrator	1919–1920		Raymond Poincaré (1860–1934)	1913–1920
	Jaume Viladrich i Gaspa (1865–1926); Apostolic Administrator	1919–1920		Paul Deschanel (1855–1922)	1920
	Justí Guitart i Vilardebó (1875–1940)	1920–1940		Paul Deschanel (1855–1922)	1920
	Justí Guitart i Vilardebó (1875–1940)	1920–1940		Alexandre Millerand (1859–1943)	1920–1924
	Justí Guitart i Vilardebó (1875–1940)	1920–1940		Gaston Doumergue (1863–1937)	1924–1931
	Justí Guitart i Vilardebó (1875–1940)	1920–1940		Paul Doumer (1857–1932)	1931–1932
	Justí Guitart i Vilardebó (1875–1940)	1920–1940		Albert Lebrun (1871–1950)	1932–1940
	Ricard Fornesa i Puigdemasa (1883–1943); Apostolic Administrator	1940–1943		Albert Lebrun (1871–1950)	1932–1940
	Ramón Iglesias i Navarri (1889–1972)	1943–1969	President of France Fourth Republic		
	Ramón Iglesias i Navarri (1889–1972)	1943–1969		Vincent Auriol (1884–1966)	1947–1954
	Ramón Iglesias i Navarri (1889–1972)	1943–1969		René Coty (1882–1962)	1954–1959
	Ramón Iglesias i Navarri (1889–1972)	1943–1969	President of France Fifth Republic		
	Ramón Iglesias i Navarri (1889–1972)	1943–1969		Charles de Gaulle (1890–1970)	1959–1969
	Ramón Iglesias i Navarri (1889–1972)	1943–1969		Alain Poher (1909–1996); Acting	1969
	Ramón Malla Call (1922–2014); Apostolic Administrator	1969–1971		Alain Poher (1909–1996); Acting	1969
	Ramón Malla Call (1922–2014); Apostolic Administrator	1969–1971		Georges Pompidou (1911–1974)	1969–1974
	Joan Martí i Alanis (1928–2009)	1971–2003		Georges Pompidou (1911–1974)	1969–1974
	Joan Martí i Alanis (1928–2009)	1971–2003		Alain Poher (1909–1996); Acting	1974
	Joan Martí i Alanis (1928–2009)	1971–2003		Valéry Giscard d'Estaing (1926–2020)	1974–1981
	Joan Martí i Alanis (1928–2009)	1971–2003		François Mitterrand (1916–1996)	1981–1995
	Joan Martí i Alanis (1928–2009)	1971–2003		Jacques Chirac (1932–2019)	1995–2007
	Joan Enric Vives i Sicília (born 1949)	2003–2025		Jacques Chirac (1932–2019)	1995–2007
	Joan Enric Vives i Sicília (born 1949)	2003–2025		Nicolas Sarkozy (born 1955)	2007–2012
	Joan Enric Vives i Sicília (born 1949)	2003–2025		François Hollande (born 1954)	2012–2017
	Joan Enric Vives i Sicília (born 1949)	2003–2025		Emmanuel Macron (born 1977)	2017–present
	Josep-Lluís Serrano Pentinat (born 1977)	2025–present		Emmanuel Macron (born 1977)	2017–present

== Timeline ==
=== Episcopal co-princes ===
This is a graphical lifespan timeline of the episcopal co-princes of Andorra. They are listed in order of first assuming office.

The following chart lists episcopal co-princes by lifespan (living episcopal co-princes on the green line), with the years outside of their reign in beige. Episcopal co-princes with an unknown birth date or death date are shown with only their reign or their earlier or later life.

The following chart shows episcopal co-princes by their age (living episcopal co-princes in green), with the years of their reign in blue. Episcopal co-princes with an unknown birth or death date are excluded.

=== French co-princes ===
This is a graphical lifespan timeline of the French co-princes of Andorra. They are listed in order of first assuming office.

The following chart lists French co-princes by lifespan (living French co-princes on the green line), with the years outside of their reign in beige. French co-princes with an unknown birth date or death date are shown with only their reign or their earlier or later life.

The following chart shows French co-princes by their age (living French co-princes in green), with the years of their reign in blue. French co-princes with an unknown birth or death date are excluded.

== Note ==
From 10 to 23 July 1934, a pretender, Boris Skossyreff, proclaimed himself "King of Andorra" and proposed a new constitution, but Co-Prince Vilardebó requested Spanish authorities to expel him from the country.

== See also ==
- List of representatives of the Co-Princes of Andorra
- List of heads of government of Andorra
