= Francesc Josep Catalán de Ocón =

Co-Prince of Andorra

- Bishop of Urgell
- Installed: 12 June 1757
- Term ended: 8 September 1762
- Predecessor: Sebastià de Victoria Emparán y Loyola
- Successor: Francisco Fernández de Xátiva

Orders
- Consecration: 12 June 1757 by Diego Rojas y Contreras

Personal details
- Born: Francisco José Catalán de Ocón; 2 May 1701 Torrox, Kingdom of Granada, Crown of Castile
- Died: 8 September 1762 (aged 61)
- Denomination: Catholicism

Francesc Josep Catalán de Ocón was Bishop of Urgel and ex officio Co-Prince of Andorra from 1757 to 1762.
