= Peter of Narbonne =

Peter of Narbonne may refer to:

- Peter Berenger of Narbonne (died after 1090), Bishop of Rodez (before 1053–1079), elected Archbishop of Narbonne (1079-1085)
- Peter of Narbonne (bishop of Albara) (died before 1130), Bishop of Albara (south east of Antioch) from 1098 to 1100 during the First Crusade;
- Pedro Manrique de Lara (died 1202), sometimes called Peter of Narbonne, Castilian noble, Viscount of Narbonne (1192-1202);
- Peter of Narbonne (Bishop of Urgell) (died 1347/8), Bishop of Urgell and Co-Prince of Andorra (1341-1347/8)
- Peter of Narbonne (saint) (died 1391), Franciscan missionary, Catholic saint, canonized 1970 with Nicholas Tavelic and two other friars;
