= Guillem de Montcada =

Co-Prince of Andorra from 1295 until 1308

- Died: 3 November 1308; Guissona, Principality of Catalonia
- Occupation: Roman Catholic Priest
- Title: Bishop of Urgell
- Term: 19 December 1295 - 3 November 1308
- Parent(s): Peter I of Montcada and Sibylla d'Abarca

Guillem of Montcada was Bishop of Urgell and ex officio co-lord of Andorra (the second) from 1295 to 1308. He was elected bishop of Urgell in 1295, but he did not pay the canonical obedience he owed to the bishop of Tarragona, on whom the bishopric of Urgell depended. He acted as ambassador of Pope Boniface VIII in Kingdom of Sicily.
