= Beatus (bishop of Urgell) =

Beatus was the bishop of Urgell between 850 and 857. He was preceded by Florenci, bishop from 840 to 850; and followed by Guisad I, bishop from 857 to 872.
