= Antonio Pérez (bishop) =

Spanish Roman Catholic prelate (1562–1637)

Most Reverend Antonio Pérez
- Archbishop of Tarragona
- Church: Catholic Church
- Archdiocese: Archdiocese of Tarragona
- In office: 1633–1637
- Predecessor: Juan Guzmán (archbishop)
- Successor: Francisco de Rojas-Borja y Artés
- Previous posts: Bishop of Urgell (1627–1633); Bishop of Lérida (1633)

Orders
- Consecration: 23 Aug 1627 by Antonio Zapata y Cisneros

Personal details
- Born: 2 May 1562 Santo Domingo de Silos, Spain
- Died: 1 May 1637 (age 74) Tarragona, Spain

Antonio Pérez, O.S.B. (2 May 1562 – 1 May 1637) was a Roman Catholic prelate who served as Archbishop of Tarragona (1633–1637), Bishop of Lérida (1633), and Bishop of Urgell (1627–1633).

== Biography ==
He was born in Santo Domingo de Silos, Spain on 2 May 1562 and ordained a priest in the Order of Saint Benedict. On 17 May 1627, he was appointed during the papacy of Pope Urban VIII as Bishop of Urgell. On 23 August 1627, he was consecrated bishop by Antonio Zapata y Cisneros, Cardinal-Priest of Santa Balbina. On 21 February 1633, he was appointed during the papacy of Pope Urban VIII as Bishop of Lérida. On 28 November 1633, he was appointed during the papacy of Pope Urban VIII as Archbishop of Tarragona. He served as Archbishop of Tarragona until his death on 1 May 1637.

While bishop, he was the principal co-consecrator of Gonzalo Chacón Velasco y Fajardo, Bishop of Calahorra y La Calzada (1633).

== External links and additional sources ==
- Cheney, David M. "Diocese of Lleida". Catholic-Hierarchy.org. (for Chronology of Bishops) ^{[self-published]}
- Chow, Gabriel. "Diocese of Lleida (Spain)". GCatholic.org. (for Chronology of Bishops) ^{[self-published]}
- Cheney, David M. "Diocese of Urgell". Catholic-Hierarchy.org. (for Chronology of Bishops)^{self-published}
- Chow, Gabriel. "Diocese of Urgell (Spain)". GCatholic.org. (for Chronology of Bishops)^{self-published}
- Cheney, David M. "Archdiocese of Tarragona". Catholic-Hierarchy.org. (for Chronology of Bishops)^{self-published}
- Chow, Gabriel. "Metropolitan Archdiocese of Tarragona (Spain)". GCatholic.org. (for Chronology of Bishops)^{self-published}

Catholic Church titles
Preceded by Luis Díez de Aux y Armendáriz	Bishop of Urgell; 1627–1633	Succeeded by Pau Duran
Preceded by Pedro Antón Serra	Bishop of Lérida; 1633	Succeeded by Pedro Magarola Fontanet
Preceded by Juan Guzmán (archbishop)	Archbishop of Tarragona; 1633–1637	Succeeded by Francisco de Rojas-Borja y Artés
