= Sisebut (bishop) =

Bishop of Urgell 823–840

Sisebut (died 840) was bishop of Urgell from 823 until his death.

Little is known of his episcopate. In 833 he consecrated the church of the castle of Lillet, and in 834 the monastery of Alaó. He made a will in 839, in which he made important legacies of books to Urgell Cathedral and the monasteries of Codines, Sant Andreu de Tresponts, Santa Maria de Gerri, Sant Serni de Tavèrnoles, Alaó, and Santa Grata de Senterada and Taverna.

He supposedly signed the Act of Consecration and Endowment of Urgell Cathedral in the presence of Count Sunifred I of Urgell, in which there appears for the first time a reference to Andorra: the document mentions the six Andorran parishes as dependent on that diocese, but has been identified as an 11th-century forgery.

He increased the patrimony of the diocese with purchases, the last of which is recorded in 840.
