= Folc II of Cardona =

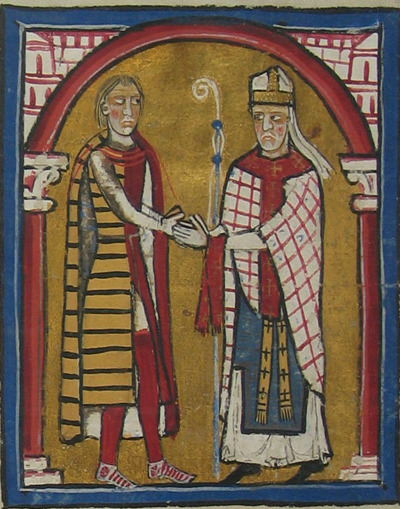
Representation of the feudal agreement between Fulco, bishop of Urgell and lord of Cardona, and William Raymond I, Count of Cerdanya, on the Castle of Cardona.

Folc II of Cardona (Cardona, c. 1040–1099) was bishop of Barcelona, elected bishop of Urgell (1092 - 1095) and viscount of Cardona.

== Career ==
He officiated in the consecration of the church of Sant Martí de Sorbet on April 26 or 27, 1095.

In 1097 a church council was held which was attended by Bishop Folc, the Archbishop of Toledo and apostolic legate, the Archbishop of Tarragona, and the bishop of Roda and Girona. In this council some disputes were settled on the possession of ecclesiastical goods; among them the possession of the church of Llinars, snatched by the bishop of Girona, Bernat Umbert on which he alleged that it belonged to him by inheritance. The council resolved in favor of the Barcelona chapter by imposing excommunication over those who opposed the resolution.

In October 1098, while bishop in Cardona, Folc donated the church of Santa Maria de Tagamanent to the monastery of Santa Fe de Concas, which was his property by paternal inheritance, with the desire that a monastery be established there.

On March 15, 1099, Folc attended the consecration of the church of Guissona where he competed with Odó bishop of Urgell to which the parish belonged, Bishop Ponç of Roda, the Counts of Urgell and Pallars.
