= Simó de Guardiola i Hortoneda =

Spanish Roman Catholic bishop (1773–1851)

His Excellency Simó de Guardiola i Hortoneda
- Bishop of Urgell, Co-Prince of Andorra
- Church: Roman Catholic Church
- See: La Seu d'Urgell
- In office: 1827–1851
- Predecessor: Bonifaci López y Pulido
- Successor: Josep Caixal i Estrade

Personal details
- Born: 6 June 1773 L'Aleixar, Tarragona, Spain
- Died: 26 August 1851 (aged 78) La Seu d'Urgell, Lleida
- Denomination: Catholic
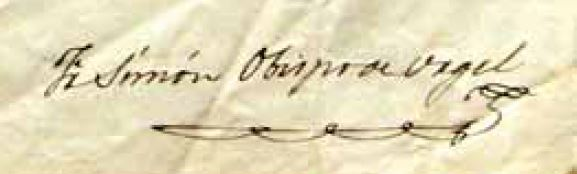
- Signature

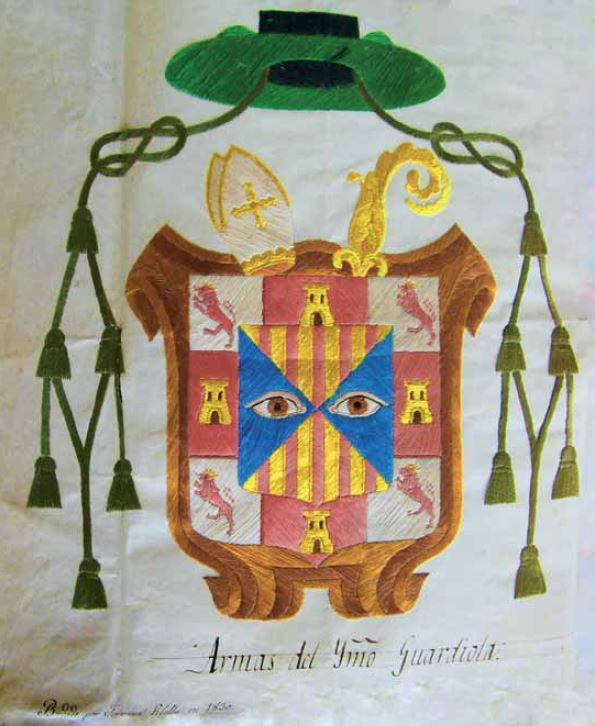
- Coat of arms

Simó de Guardiola y Hortoneda (1773–1851) was Bishop of Urgel and ex officio Co-Prince of Andorra from 1827 to 1851.
