= Leuderic II =

8th-century bishop of Urgell

Leuderic II (died 754) was a bishop of Urgell in Catalonia. He succeeded the martyred bishop Nambaudus and was succeeded after his death by bishop Esteve. Little else is known of him.
