= Galcerand de Vilanova =

Co-Prince of Andorra

Galcerand de Vilanova was Bishop of Urgel and ex-officio Co-Prince of Andorra from 1388 to 1396 and again from 1396 to 1415.
