= Joan Perez Garcia de Olivan =

Catalan Church Official

- Born: Juan Perez Garcia de Olivan; 1500; Zaragoza, Aragon
- Died: 23 September 1560 (aged 59–60); La Seu d'Urgell, Catalonia
- Occupation: Catholic Bishop
- Title: Bishop of Urgell
- Term: 24 April 1556 – 23 September 1560

Joan Perez Garcia de Olivan (1500–1560; born Joan Pérez García de Oliván) held the titles of Bishop of Urgell and co-prince of Andorra

Juan Pérez García de Oliván was the second son of the knight Juan García and Joana Pérez de Oliván, brother of Felipe García y Pérez de Oliván, priest of Charles V of the Holy Roman Empire and I of Spain and Philip II of Castile and eldest son of the family unit of Jerónimo García Pérez de Oliván, who was a merino of the city of Zaragoza, armed knight in 1535, member of the Order of St. James in 1549 and died in Portugal in 1554.

He was probably governor and visitor of the Imperial Canal of Aragon and Navarre (at some point unknown before 1542). He was chancellor of powers from January 1542 until shortly afterwards because in 1543 he is recorded as abbot of Santa Maria d'Alaó and deputy of the Kingdom of Aragon (representing the aforementioned monastery). From 24 April 1556 he was bishop of Urgell until his death on 23 September 1560. In the meantime he was also commissioner of the Holy Crusade, curator of the military orders of Saint James, Calatrava and Alcántara, consultor of the Holy Office by appointment on 9 March 1543, judge of residence and chaplain to Charles V.

== Writings ==
There is a letter from Joan García de Oliván, abbot of Alaó (later bishop of Urgell) to Martí Pérez de Oliván, inquisitor of Cardona and abbot of the Monastery of San Juan de la Peña, discussing the collection of fruits from his abbey and informing him that Ferdinand of Austria, king of Hungary and Bohemia, had passed through Zaragoza.
