= Ranarius =

7th-century Spanish bishop

Ranarius (Catalan: Renari) was a seventh-century bishop of Urgell in northern Spain, known to have participated in the fourth Council of Toledo in 633.
