= Francesc Antoni de la Dueña y Cisneros =

Bishop of Urgel, ex-officio Co-Prince of Andorra

Francisco Antonio de la Dueña y Cisneros (referred to in Catalan as Francesc Antoni de la Dueña y Cisneros) (1753–1821), was a Spanish clergyman. He was born in Villanueva de la Fuente, Ciudad Real. He studied philosophy at the university of Almagro, Ciudad Real, followed by law at the University of Toledo, and completed his studies at the University of Salamanca from 1778 to 1796. He was installed as Bishop of Urgell (and ex officio Co-Prince of Andorra) from 29 October 1797 to 23 September 1816.
