= La Seu d'Urgell Cathedral =

Cathedral in Catalonia

- Cathedral of Saint Mary
- Catalan: Catedral de Santa Maria; Spanish: Catedral de Santa María
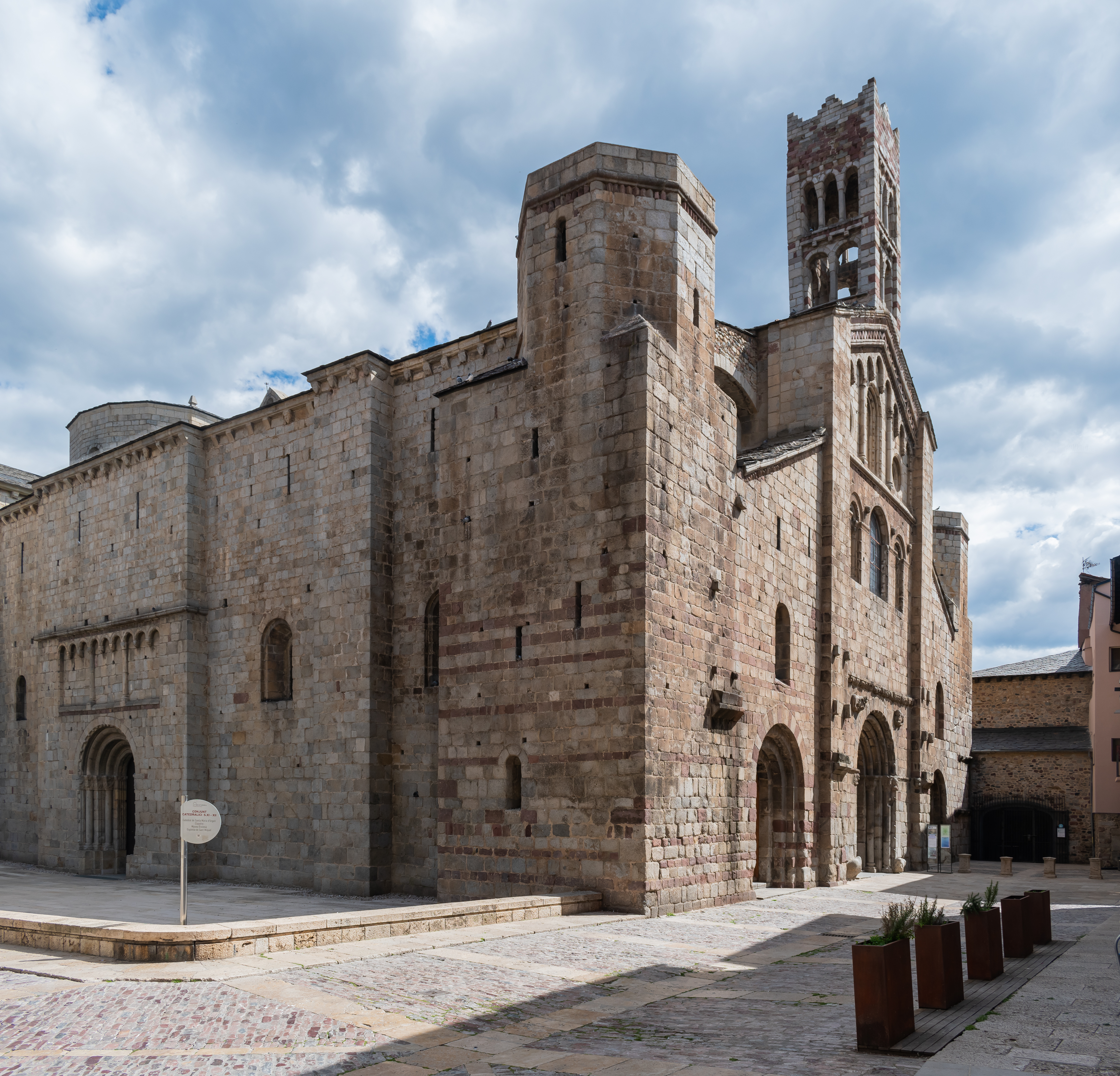
- West façade
- La Seu d'Urgell Cathedral
- 42°21′28″N 1°27′42″E
- Location: La Seu d'Urgell
- Address: 16, Plaça del Deganat
- Country: Spain
- Denomination: Catholic
- Website: museucatedralseudurgell.org

History
- Status: Cathedral
- Dedication: Mary, mother of Jesus
- Dedicated: 1040 (Note: Consecretion year of the third of the four cathedrals that were erected here. The current building, started in 1116 by Bishop Ot remains in many aspects, unfinished.)

Architecture
- Architect: Ramon Llambard
- Style: Romanesque
- Years built: 1116–1182

Administration
- Metropolis: Tarragona
- Diocese: Urgell

Clergy
- Bishop: Josep-Lluís Serrano Pentinat

Spanish Cultural Heritage
- Type: Non-movable
- Criteria: Monument
- Designated: 3 June 1931
- Reference no.: RI-51-0000689

The Cathedral of Saint Mary is a Roman Catholic cathedral located in the city of La Seu d'Urgell, Spain. It is the seat of the Bishops of Urgell, who together with the president of the French Republic are one of the Co-Princes of Andorra. The cathedral is the seat of the Roman Catholic Diocese of Urgell, the includes also the country of Andorra.

The cathedral is considered unique within Catalan Romanesque architecture for the Italianate-style features on the ornaments of its west front. The Bishop of Urgell was tasked with defending the alpine passes from potential Muslim attacks. The cathedral is thus usually fortified. Serving originally as both a religious and a military structure.

== History ==
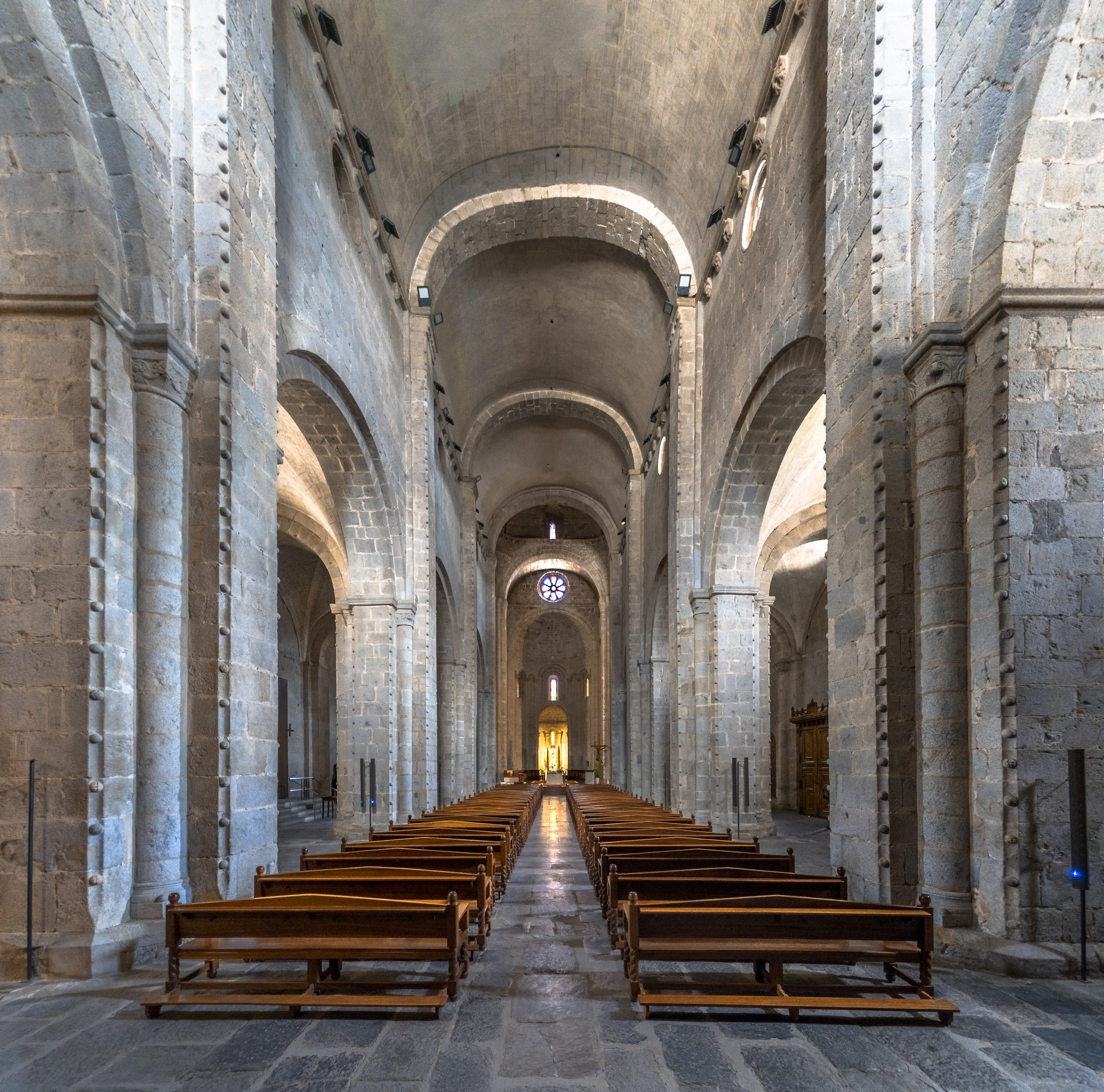
Interior

The construction of the cathedral was begun in 1116 to designs by the master mason Ramon Llambard and is therefore one of the oldest cathedrals in Catalonia. It is the source of the name of the city: originally referred to as the City of Urgell, it is now called "See of Urgell" (La Seu d'Urgell), derived from the Latin Sedes Urgelli, meaning that the town is the episcopal seat.

The cathedral is dedicated to the Virgin Mary, patroness of the city, and has a 13th-century statue known as the Mother of God of Urgell (Mare de Déu d'Urgell) and also as the Virgin of Andorra.

The cathedral has had several restorations in the 20th century. The first was initiated by Josep Puig i Cadafalch in 1918. Between 1955 and 1974 the church was restored again. During these works, the unfinished parts of the cathedral were covered with stone. In addition, some of the added parts were removed to recover the external aspect of the original cathedral. Part of the façade was recovered and the interior was reformed, which had been somewhat disfigured by the plaster cover applied to it in the 18th century.

The 16th-century composer Joan Brudieu was maestro di capilla of the cathedral from 1548 to 1591.

== Gallery ==
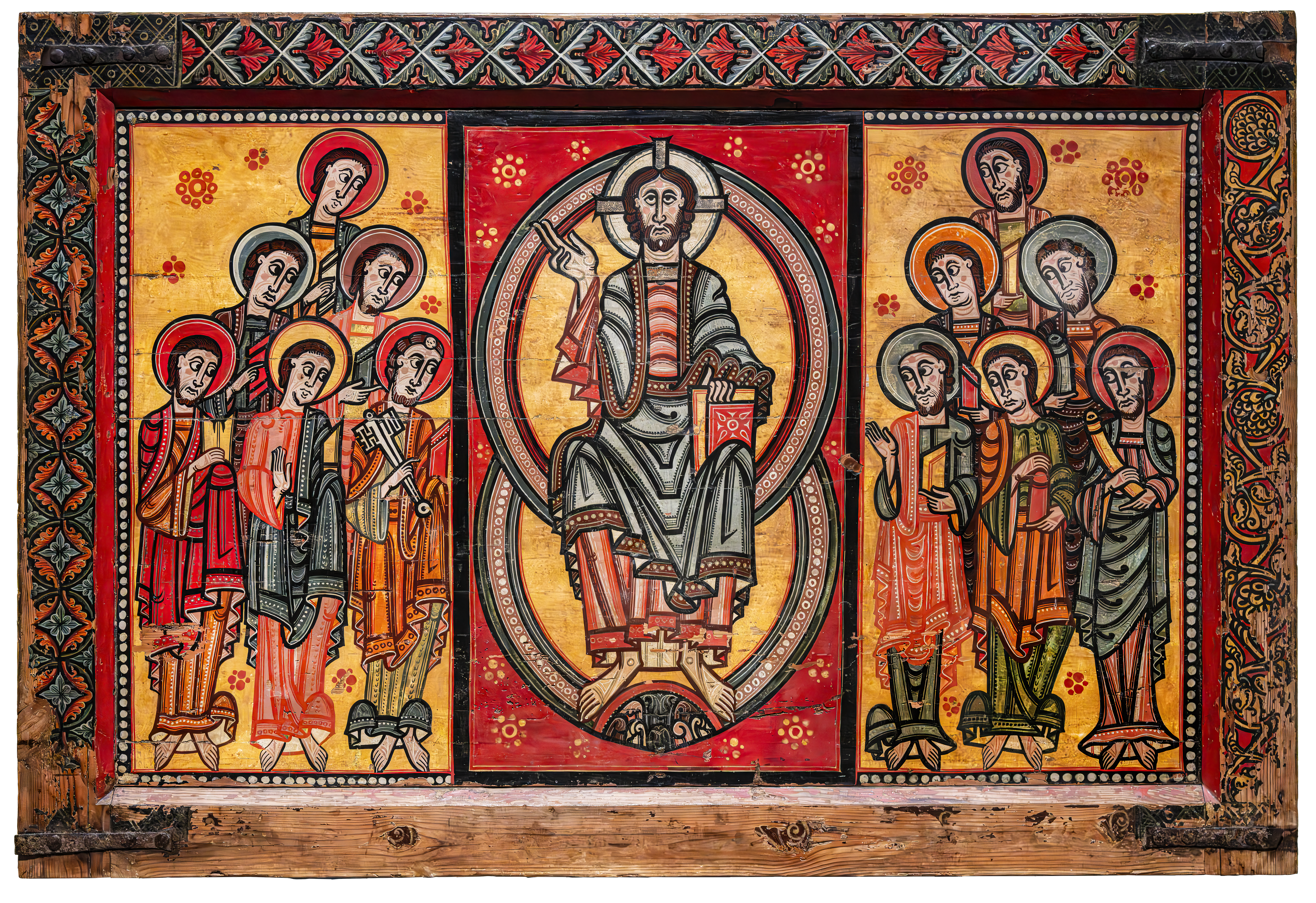
Frontal from La Seu d'Urgell or of The Apostles, now conserved at MNAC Barcelona

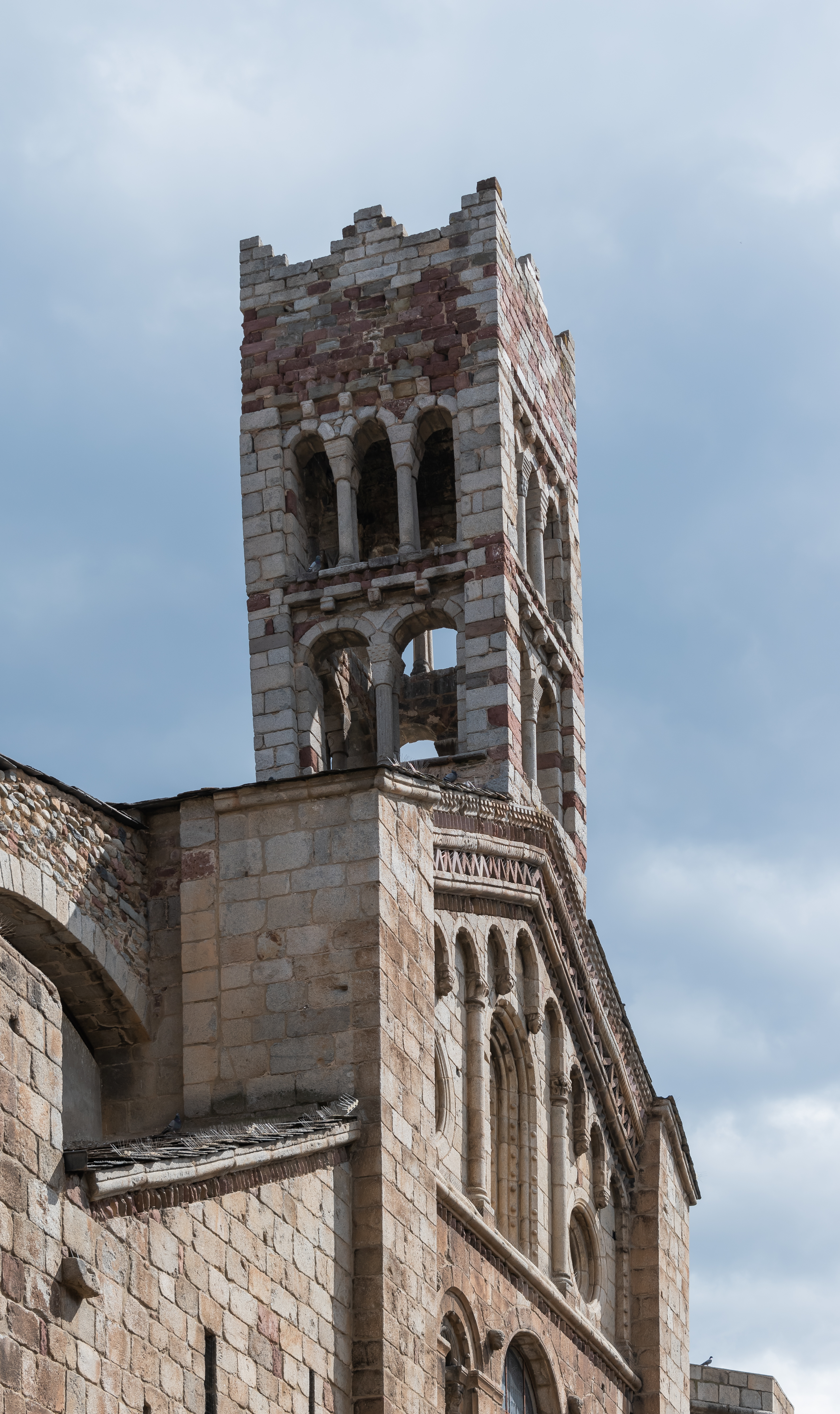
Bell tower

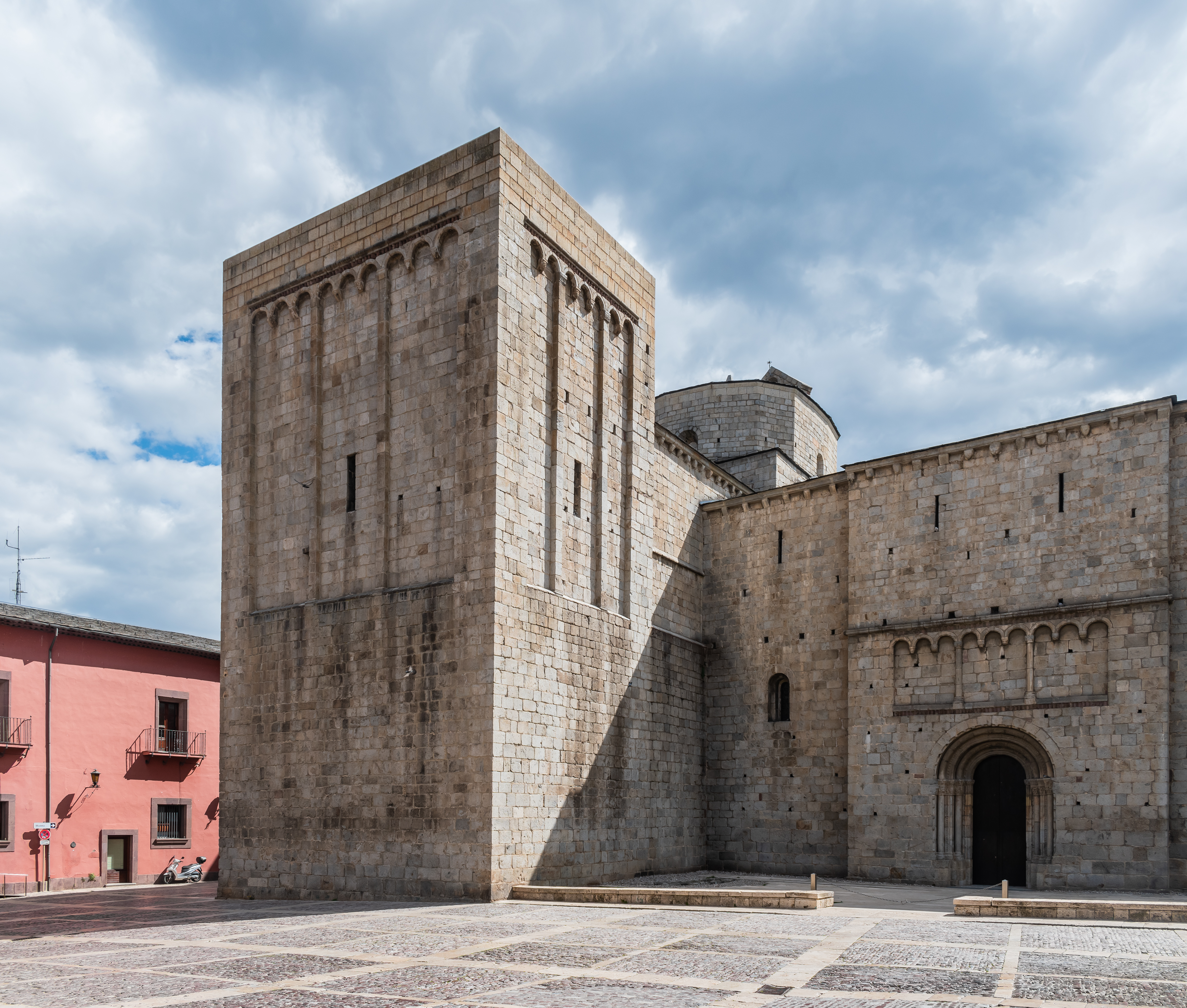
North tower

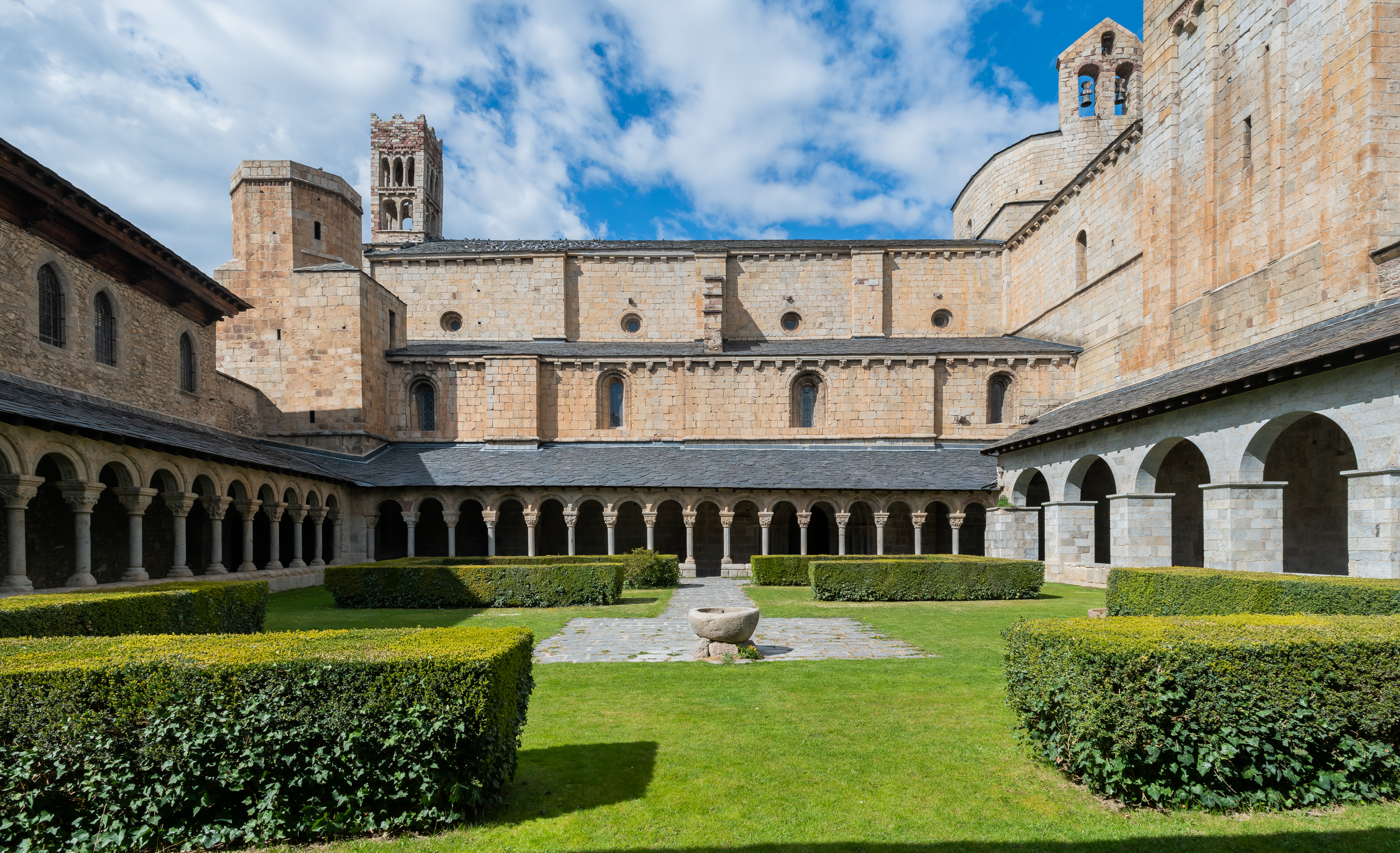
Cloister

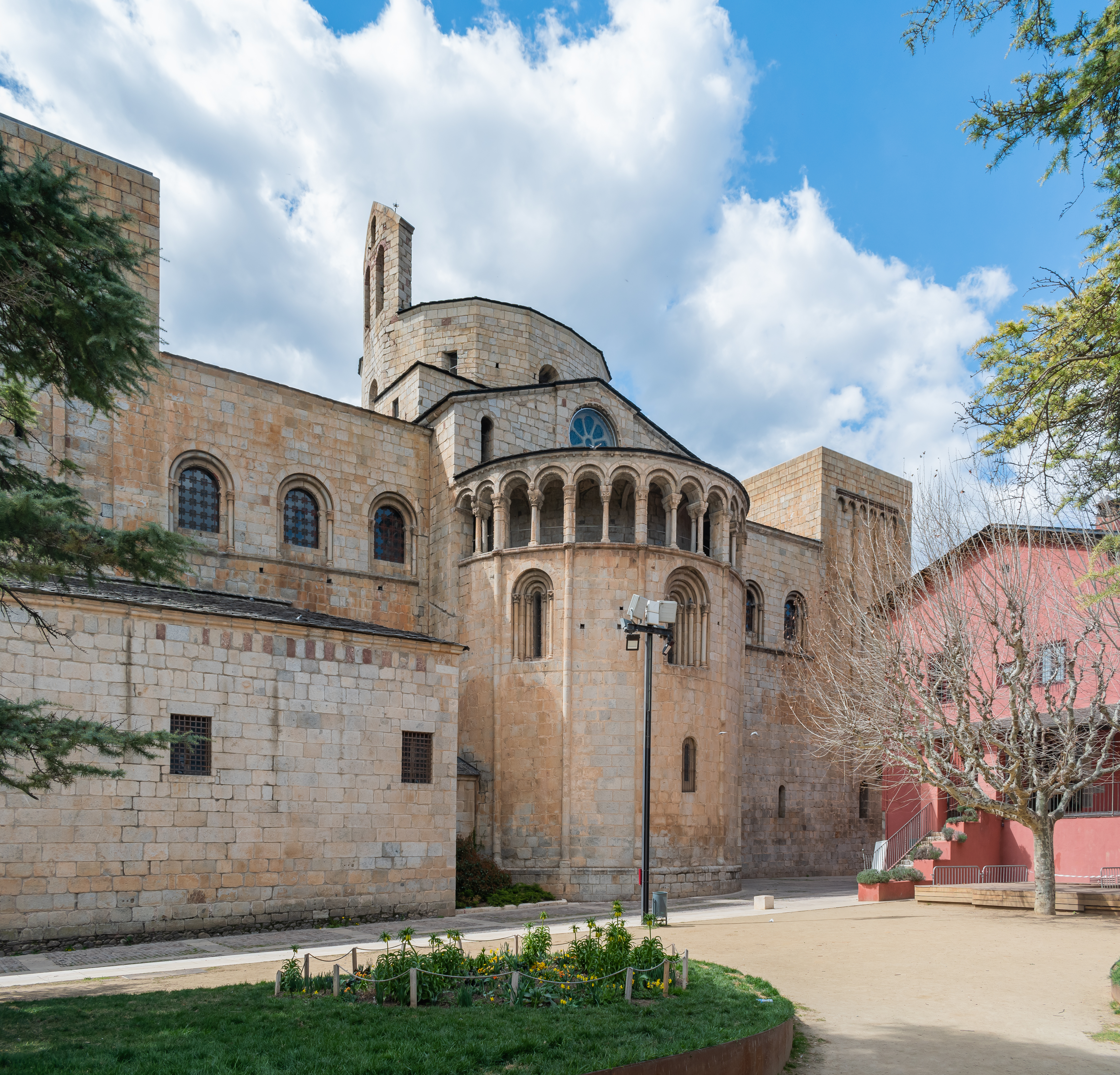
Apse
