= Ramon Llambard =

12th-century Catalonian architect

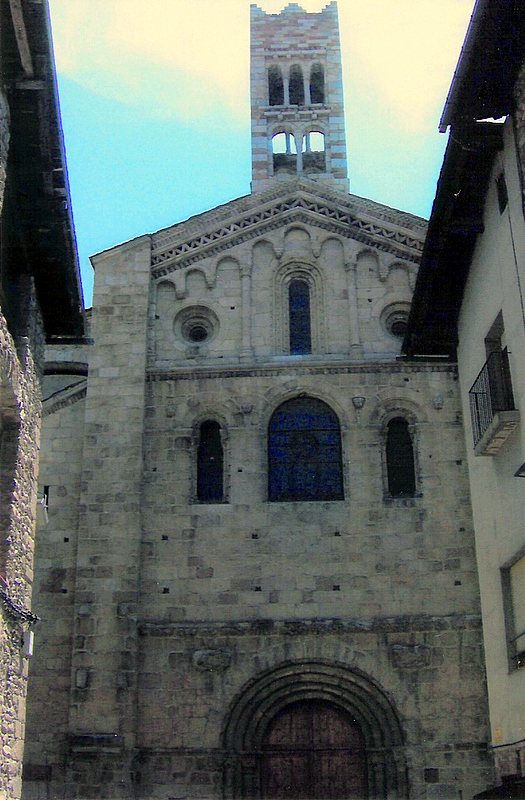
Facade and bell-tower of La Seu d'Urgell Cathedral, designed by Ramon Llambard.

Ramon Llambard, Ramon Lambard, Raimon Lambard or Raimundo Lambardo (died c. 1195) was a medieval architect and master of works active in Catalonia in the 12th century. He is most notable for his design of La Seu d'Urgell Cathedral.

== Bibliography (in Spanish) ==
- Joan-Albert Adell, Pere Beseran, Albert Sierra i Albert Villaró, (2000), La catedral de la Seu d'Urgell, Manresa.
- Josep Puig i Cadafalch, (1918), Santa Maria de la Seu d’Urgell: Estudi monogràfic, Barcelona.
