= Justus II (bishop of Urgell) =

Just, also known as Justus II, was bishop of Urgell in northern Spain from 721 until c. 733. He was bishop when the invading Moors sacked the city of Urgell.

Very little is known of his episcopate, as records of the time were scant. He probably died when the city fell.
