= Sebastià de Victoria Emparán y Loyola =

Bishop of Urgel and ex officio Co-Prince of Andorra

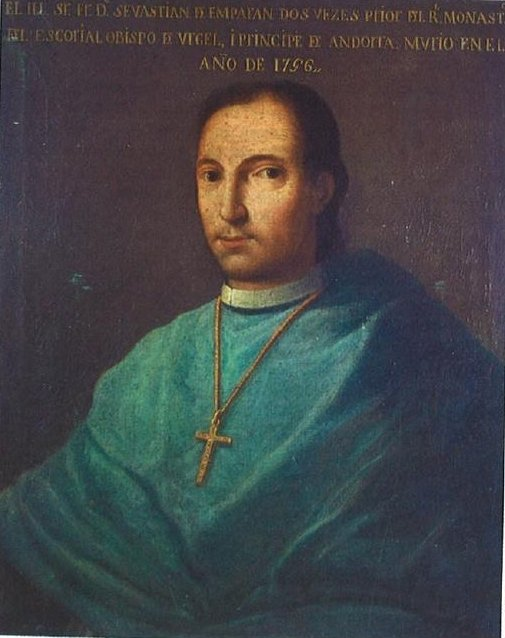
Sebastián de Emparan y Azcue

Sebastià de Victoria Emparán y Loyola was Bishop of Urgel and ex officio Co-Prince of Andorra from 1747 to 1756.
