= Peter of Narbonne (bishop of Urgell) =

Prince of Andorra and Bishop of Urgell

Pere de Narbona
- Died: 1347
- Occupation: Catholic Priest
- Title: Bishop of Urgell
- Term: 17 December 1341 – 1347
- Predecessor: Arnau de Llordà
- Successor: Niccolò Capocci
- Parent(s): Amalric II of Narbonne and Joan of Illa-Jordà

Pere de Narbona or Peter of Narbonne was a Catholic prelate, who served as the Bishop of Urgell and a Co-prince of Andorra from 1341 to 1347. He was the son of Amalric II, Viscount of Narbonne, and Joanna of l'Isle-Jourdain. He worked alongside the secular co-princes Gaston II of Foix (1341–1343) and Gaston III of Foix (1343–1348).
