= Josep de Boltas =

Bishop of Urgel, ex-officio Co-Prince of Andorra

Josep de Boltas (died 1795) was Bishop of Urgel and ex officio Co-Prince of Andorra from 1785 to 1795. Born in Oran, Algeria, he became Bishop of Urgell and Co-prince of Andorra on 31 March 1785. During his ten years in office he steered a course of neutrality during the French Revolution. He contributed important legislative work and improved the health, economy and security of the region. He died in office in 1795.
