= Leuberic =

Leuberic or Lubericus (fl. 680–693) was a 7th-century bishop of Urgell in Catalonia. His presence is recorded at the Councils of Toledo in 683, 688 and 693.

He was bishop in Urgell at the time of the Muslim conquest of the Iberian peninsula. The diocese of Urgell functioned throughout the entire Islamic occupation of Spain.

He was succeeded by Urbici.
