= Dotila =

Bishop of Urgell

Dotila or Dottila (died 781) was the bishop of Urgell between 765 and his death in 781.

Very little is known of his life. According to the chronicles he succeeded Leuric as bishop and was a leader in the resistance of the city of Urgell to the Muslim conquest of Spain. He met his death when the Moors took the city.
