= Bernat Francés Caballero i Mathet =

Bishop and Co-Prince of Andorra

Bernat Francès Caballero i Mathet was Bishop of Urgell and ex officio Co-Prince of Andorra from 28 July 1817 to 27 September 1824.

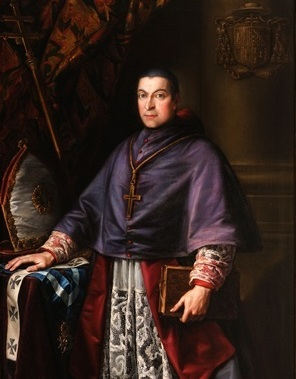
Bernardo Francés Caballero
