= Juan Manuel de Espinosa =

Juan Manuel de Espinosa (1598 – 12 February 1679) was a Castilian nobleman and prelate who served as bishop of Urgell and co-prince of Andorra from 1660 to 1664 and archbishop of Tarragona from 1664 until his death.
