= Francesc de Tovia =

Bishop of Urgell

Francesc de Tovia was Bishop of Urgell and ex officio co-lord of Andorra from 1415 to 1436.
