= Ingobert =

Co-Prince of Andorra and bishop

Ingobert was a bishop of Urgell and co-Prince of Andorra.

Ingobert, was unable to take up the cathedra due to a serious illness. Taking advantage of the opportunity, a Spanish clergyman named Esclua usurped the title of bishop of Urgell.

Esclua was a clergyman from Cerdanya who must have been a potentate from that region. His patrimony, which he bequeathed when he died in 924, was in the towns of Ger and d'All and, in addition, he owned the castle of Montgrony, which he sold to the counts Guifré el Pilós and his wife Guinedilda before of June of 885. Pope Stephen VI and the successive councils of Sant Genís de Fontanes, in Porto and Urgell in 892, condemned Esclua who was degraded by breaking his mitre and stripped of his garments and rings.

Ingobert was elected bishop between 883 and 885, the latter; 885, was the first date where it is mentioned. It is not known when he died and therefore it is not known when he ceased to be bishop, but it was between 893 and 899, as the year 893 was the date when Ingobert consecrated his last church and 899 was the date when Nantigís consecrated his first church.

On January 9, 890, Ingobert consecrated the church of Sant Climent in the town of Ardocale (Ardòvol?); and on October 29 of that same year he signed the deed of dedication of the church of Sant Andreu de Baltarga. In 893 he also consecrated the church of Santa Maria de Merlès in the County of Berga.
