= Ponç de Vilamur =

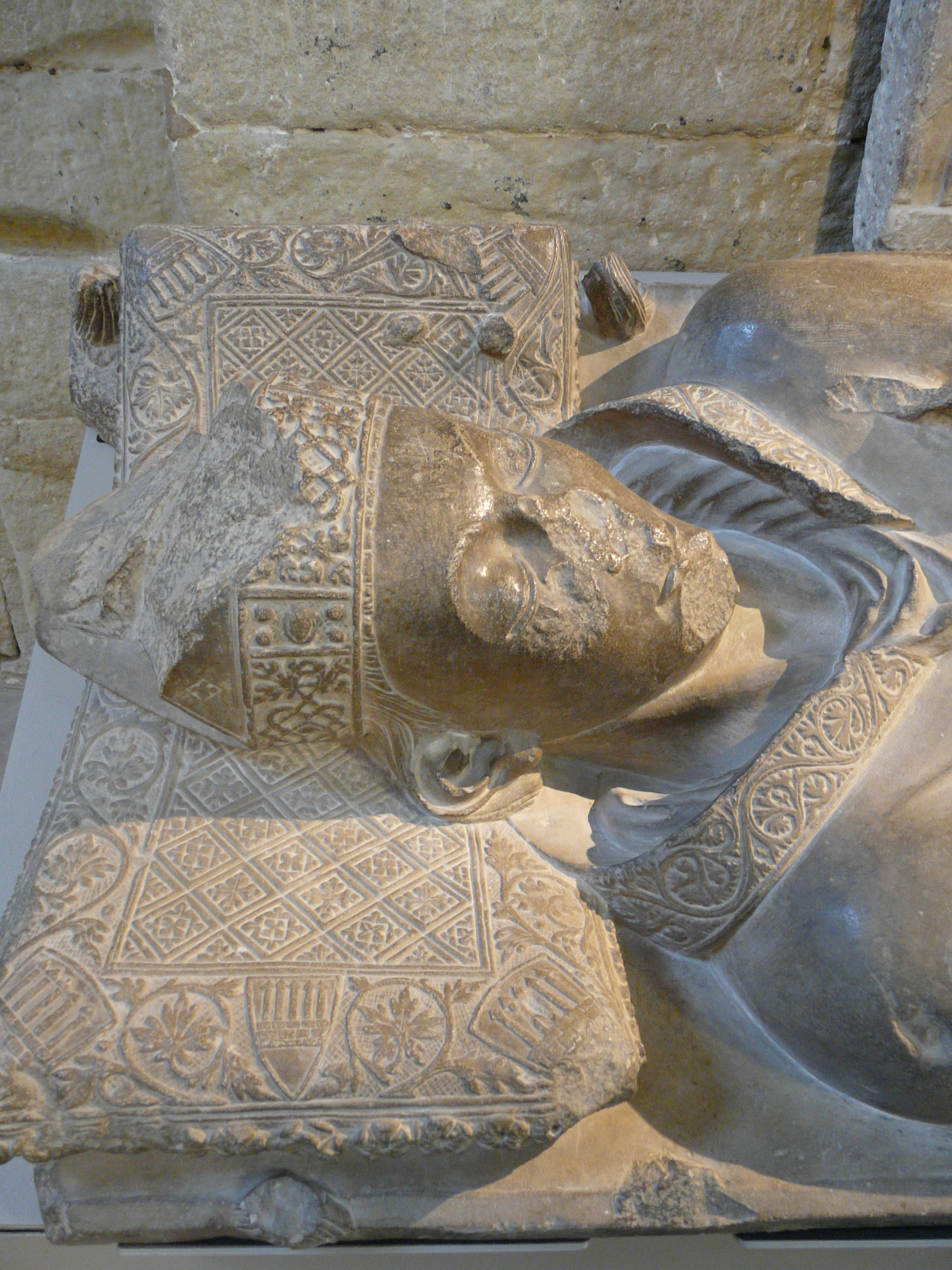
- Title: Bishop of Urgel

Personal life
- Parent: Viscount Peter IV of Vilamur
- Relatives: Bernat de Vilamur (Uncle, Bishop of Urgel); * Berenguer de Erill (Uncle, Bishop of Lleida)

Religious life
- Religion: Christianity

Ponç de Vilamur (?, - 1196 -?, - 1257) was Bishop of Urgel (1230–1255/1257).

His father was Viscount Peter IV of Vilamur and his uncles were Bernat de Vilamur, Bishop of Urgel, and Berenguer de Erill, Bishop of Lleida. By the influence of his uncles he was sacristan of Lleida and Archedian of Tremp. In 1230 he became Bishop of Urgel. He was an opponent of the Cathar heresy in the diocese of Urgel. The artistic patronage he exercised as bishop was reflected in the set of mural paintings of St. Catherine of the Cathedral of St. Mary of Urgel.

During his bishopric he confronted Roger IV of Foix, but he also had enemies within the Catholic church accusing him of crimes and vices, an accusation that reached Rome in 1248. Raimundo de Peñafort was sent by the pope to clarify the issue and probably lost office.
