= Pau Duran =

Co-Prince of Andorra

Pau Duran (Esparreguera, 31 December 1582 - Areny de Noguera, 18 February 1651) was a bishop of Urgell and co-prince of Andorra.

He studied at the University of Huesca, obtained a bachelor's degree in law in 1602 and a degree in 1603. In 1612 he published his first legal work in Mallorca. In January 1626 he had been appointed Archdeacon of the Canons of the Cathedral of Barcelona. During the wars with France he fled his cathedral during a riot of the local population. The governor capitulated and the bishop Duran was implicated. He was expelled from his bishopric.
