= Pere d'Urtx =

Co-prince of Andorra

- Born: 13th century Urtx, Cerdanya
- Died: 12 January 1293; Seu d'Urgell, Urgell, Catalonia
- Burial place: Cathedral of Santa Maria d'Urgell, Seu d'Urgell, Catalonia, Spain
- Occupation: Catholic bishop
- Years active: 1269–1293
- Title: Bishop of Urgell
- Term: 3 November 1269 – 12 January 1293
- Parent(s): Galceran d'Urtx and Blanca, lady of Mataplana

Pere d'Urtx (Catalan pronunciation: [ˈuɾtʃ] OORTCH) was Bishop of Urgell from 1269 to 1293. He became the first Episcopal co-lord of Andorra when he signed the paréage establishing joint-lordship over the territory with Roger-Bernard III, Count of Foix in 1278.

The paréage ended almost a century of conflict over the territory between successive Bishops of Urgell, on the one hand, and Viscounts of Castellbò and Counts of Foix, on the other, and effectively established, within the Princiality of Catalonia, an Andorran polity which would evolve to the modern state of Andorra. He was archdeacon of Prats and became the bishop of Urgell on 3 November 1269. He attended the provincial councils of 1274, 1279 and 1292.

As the bishop of Urgell, he was concerned about the life of the city's canons and gave facilities to its members to pursue university studies. He also carried out restoration and conservation works for its cathedral and its surroundings, such as the cloister. In 1277, Roger-Bernard III, Count of Foix, took the castle of Pla de Sant Tirs with an army of 1,000 knights and 10,000 soldiers. The bishop made peace. The two parties signed the first pareage in Lleida on September 8, 1278. They signed a second pareage on December 6, 1288. He was buried in the Cathedral of Santa Maria d'Urgell after his death in January 1293.
