= Juan de García y Montenegro =

Bishop of Urgel, ex-officio Co-Prince of Andorra

Juan de García y Montenegro was Bishop of Urgell and ex officio Co-Prince of Andorra from 1780 to 1783.
