= Pedro Folc de Cardona =

Co-Prince of Andorra

Coat of arms of the Dukes of Cardona, Catalonia, Spain (since 1491)

Pedro Folc de Cardona (Catalan: Pere Folc de Cardona) (died 11 April 1530), an illegitimate son of Joan Ramon Folc de Cardona y de Prades, 3rd Count of Cardona, was bishop of Urgell (1472–1515), president of the Generalitat of Catalonia (1482–85), editor of the Usatges de Barcelona (1505), viceroy of Catalonia (1521–23) and archbishop of Tarragona (1515–30).

== History ==
Pere's half-brother Joan Ramon Folc IV de Cardona y d'Urgell (afterwards 1st Duke of Cardona) was ordered by King John II of Aragon to attack Hug Roger III of Pallars, a cousin of Pere's father. Eventually, after interventions in France and Italy, Hug Roger III, Count of Pallars, was imprisoned at the Royal Prison Castle of Xàtiva, occupied also by famous and ambitious Spanish-Italian Cesare Borgia, where he died in 1509. As a token of both brothers' loyalty to old king John II of Aragon and his son, King Ferdinand II, lands and titles, as a Marquess of Pallars were passed to the 1st Duke of Cardona, Pere de Cardona's legitimate brother.

In 1467, Pere's half-brother married Aldonça Enríquez, a sister-in-law of King John II and aunt of Ferdinand II as the sister of Juana Enríquez.

King John II's son, Ferdinand II (1452 - king successor of the Aragonese kingdom and the Principality of Catalonia, 1479–1516; king of Aragon and Catalonia since 1479 and husband to queen regnant Isabella I of Castile since December 1474), rewarded Bishop Pere's brother Juan Ramon Folc IV, too, with the title of 1st Duke of Cardona, 1491, while Pere stayed as a Bishop of the very important episcopal See of Urgell till 1515, moving him then to the position of Archbishop of Tarragona.

Ferdinand II's 16-year-old grandson, King Charles I of Spain, a.k.a. Charles V, Holy Roman Emperor, and his mentally ill mother Queen Joan I of Castile "The Mad", confirmed this position. However, he died from the black death at Alcover in the province of Tarragona, Catalonia, Spain, on 11 April 1530, when escaping from the plague or black death at Tarragona.
