= Ot of Urgell =

Spanish Catholic bishop

Saint Odo of Urgell
- Bishop of Urgell
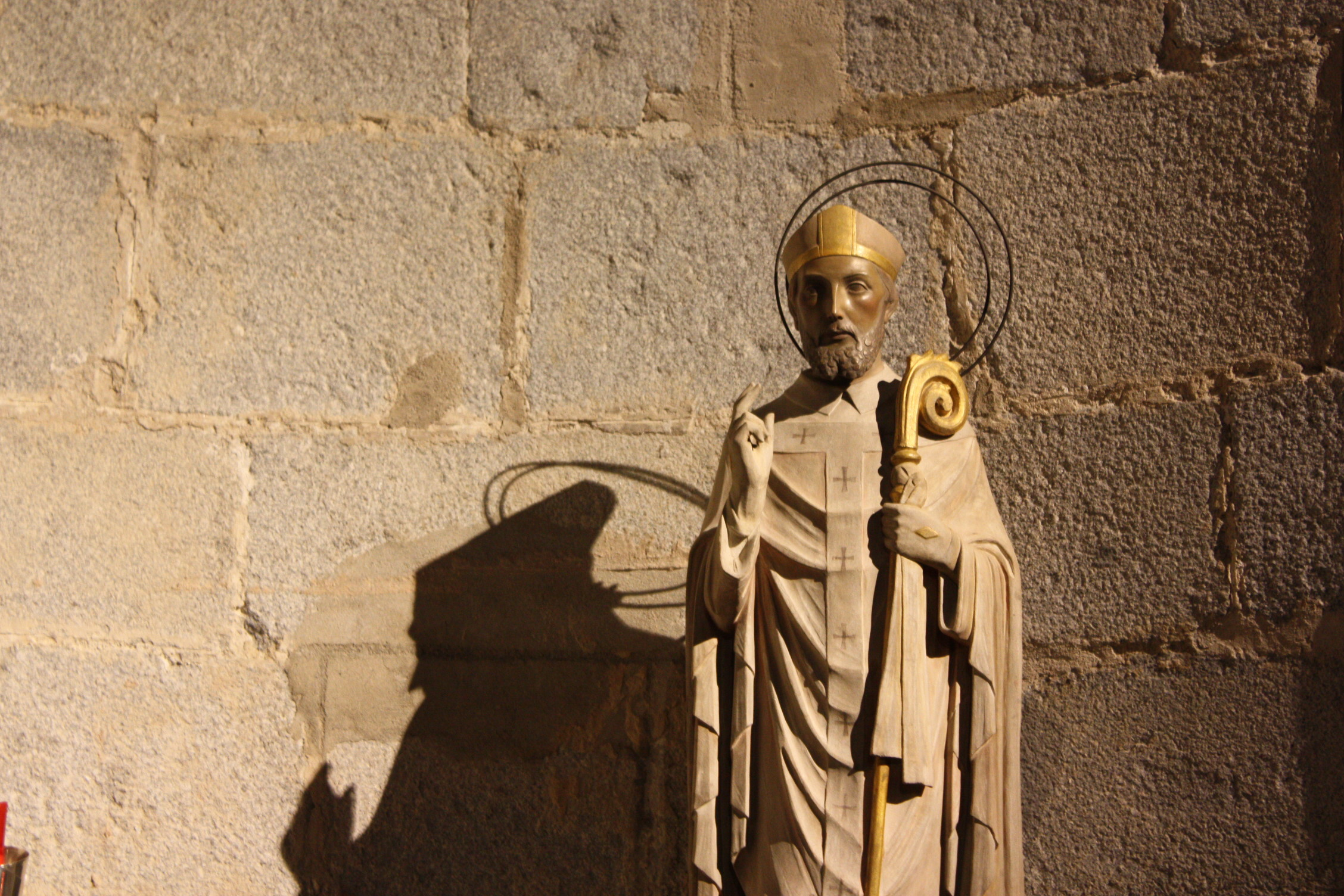
- Statue of Saint Odo
- Native name: Ot d'Urgell
- Church: Catholic Church
- Diocese: Diocese of Urgell
- In office: 9 August 1095 – 9 July 1122
- Predecessor: Guillem Arnau
- Successor: Bernat de Vilamur

Orders
- Ordination: 24 March 1095
- Consecration: 25 March 1095 by Pope Urban II

Personal details
- Born: 1065 County of Pallars Sobirà, Catalan counties
- Died: July 9, 1122 (aged 56–57)

Saint Odo of Urgell (Catalan: Ot, Odó or Dot Spanish: Odón) (c. 1065 – 1122) was a bishop of Urgell, noted for his care for the poor. He was from the family of the counts of Pallars Sobirà. He is buried in the monastery of Santa Maria de Gerri. In 1133 his successor declared him to be a saint, and he is venerated as such today. Odo is one of the patron saints of the town of La Seu d'Urgell. His feast day is July 7.
