= Nambaudus =

Bishop of Urgell, Spain (died 731)

Nambaudus or Anambadus (died 731) was a bishop of Urgell in northern Spain.

Very little is known of his episcopate, except that he is documented in a manuscript dated around 725.

== Biography ==
In 731, Nambaudus remained loyal to the Arab governor during the rebellion of the Berber Munussa. He was captured by the rebel chieftain and burned alive in a bonfire in Llivia.

In 731, Visigoth forces were rebelling against Arab rule. Bishop Anambad, the then bishop of Urgell, did not want to help the rebels and remained loyal to the authority of the Arab governor, so he was captured by Munussa, a Berber leader who led the revolt in the area. Munussa immediately executed Anambad's supporters, but preferred to take him alive to Llívia and burn him at the stake.
