= Guisad I (bishop of Urgell) =

Bishop of Urgell

Guisad I (fl. 860-872) was bishop of Urgell during the 9th century.

He followed Beat as bishop and preceded Golderic. The date of his elevation to the bishopric is not known, and neither is the date of his death. In 860 Bishop Guisad received the privilege of protection by King Charles the Bald. In the same year Guisad attended the council of Thusy (Tussiaco) in Languedoc. He was also a signatory of a sentence jointly with judges Golteredo and Ansulfo in a lawsuit brought by Ispalarico against Leofredo, dated 17 March 872.
