= Ramon Trebaylla =

Co-Prince of Andorra

- Died: 12 May 1326
- Occupation: Roman Catholic Priest
- Title: Bishop of Urgell
- Term: 29 July 1309 - 12 May 1326

Ramón Trebaylla was a Bishop of Urgell who served as Episcopal Co-Prince of Andorra from 1309 to 1326. He served alongside French Co-Princes Gaston I (1309–1315) and Gaston II of Foix - Bearne (1315–1326).
