= Francisco Fernández de Xátiva =

Bishop and Co-Prince of Andorra

Francisco Fernández de Xátiva y Contreras (13 August 1704 – 22 April 1771) was Bishop of Urgel and ex-officio Co-Prince of Andorra from 1763 to 1771. He was born in Casas-Ibáñez.
