= Luis Díez de Aux y Armendáriz =

Spanish churchman and politician

Luis Díez de Aux y Armendáriz (Quito, c. 1571 - Barcelona, 3 January 1627) was a Spanish churchman and politician.

== Biography ==
His family was from Navarra and Aragón, but he was born in Quito, Ecuador where his father Lope Díez Aux de Armendáriz was president of the Real Audiencia de Quito. His elder brother was Lope Díez de Armendáriz, who would become 1st Marquess of Cadreita and Viceroy of New Spain.

Luis moved to Spain and became a Cistercian monk in the monastery of Valparaíso de Zamora. In 1613 the Duke of Lerma appointed him abbot of the monastery of Santa María de la Oliva in Navarra, thanks to his brother's services to the Crown.

He was bishop of Jaca in 1618 and Urgell in 1622, and as such was co-prince of Andorra along with King Louis XIII of France.

In 1626 he was appointed viceroy of Catalonia by King Felipe IV. He was also promoted to the Archbishopric of Tarragona but he died in January 1627 before taking possession of it.
