= Arnau Roger de Pallars =

Bishop of Urgell

Arnau Roger de Pallars (1408 – 1461) was bishop of Urgell and co-prince of Andorra between 1436 and 1461.

He was the son of Hugh Roger II and brother of Roger Bernat I. He was an adviser to Alfonso the Magnanimous in Italy, ambassador to Rome (1455) and patriarch of Alexandria (1457).
