= Altar frontal from La Seu d'Urgell or of The Apostles =

12th century Romanesque painting

Frontal from La Seu d'Urgell or of The Apostles
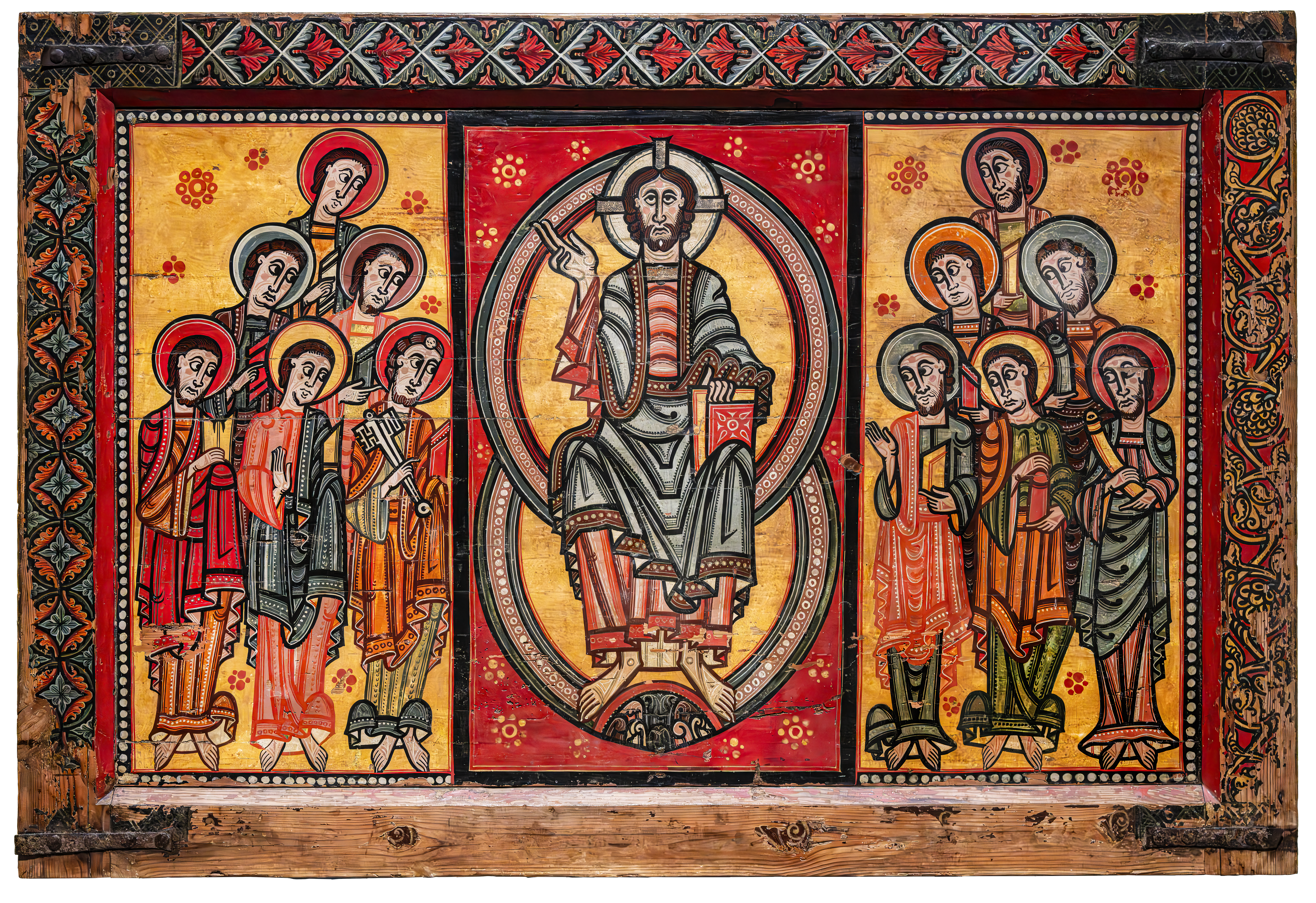
- Artist: Unknown
- Year: 12th century
- Medium: Tempera on pine wood
- Dimensions: 102.5 cm × 151 cm (40.4 in × 59 in)
- Location: Museu Nacional d'Art de Catalunya; Barcelona

The Altar frontal from La Seu d'Urgell or of The Apostles is a Romanesque altar frontal currently exhibited at the National Art Museum of Catalonia, Barcelona, Spain. The work dates from the second quarter of the 12th century and comes from a church of the Bishop of La Seu d'Urgell and was acquired in 1905. It is one of the masterpieces of the collection of panel painting of the MNAC. The frontal, the item covering the front of the altar, stands out for the quality of its bright colours and because it illustrates some of the characteristics of composition in Romanesque art, such as bilateral symmetry, abstraction of the background, with no reference to space or context, and the unnatural geometrical treatment of form to be observed in the folds of the clothing. It also shows certain conventions of representation, such as so-called hierarchical perspective, which consists in representing the chief character in a larger size.

== Description ==
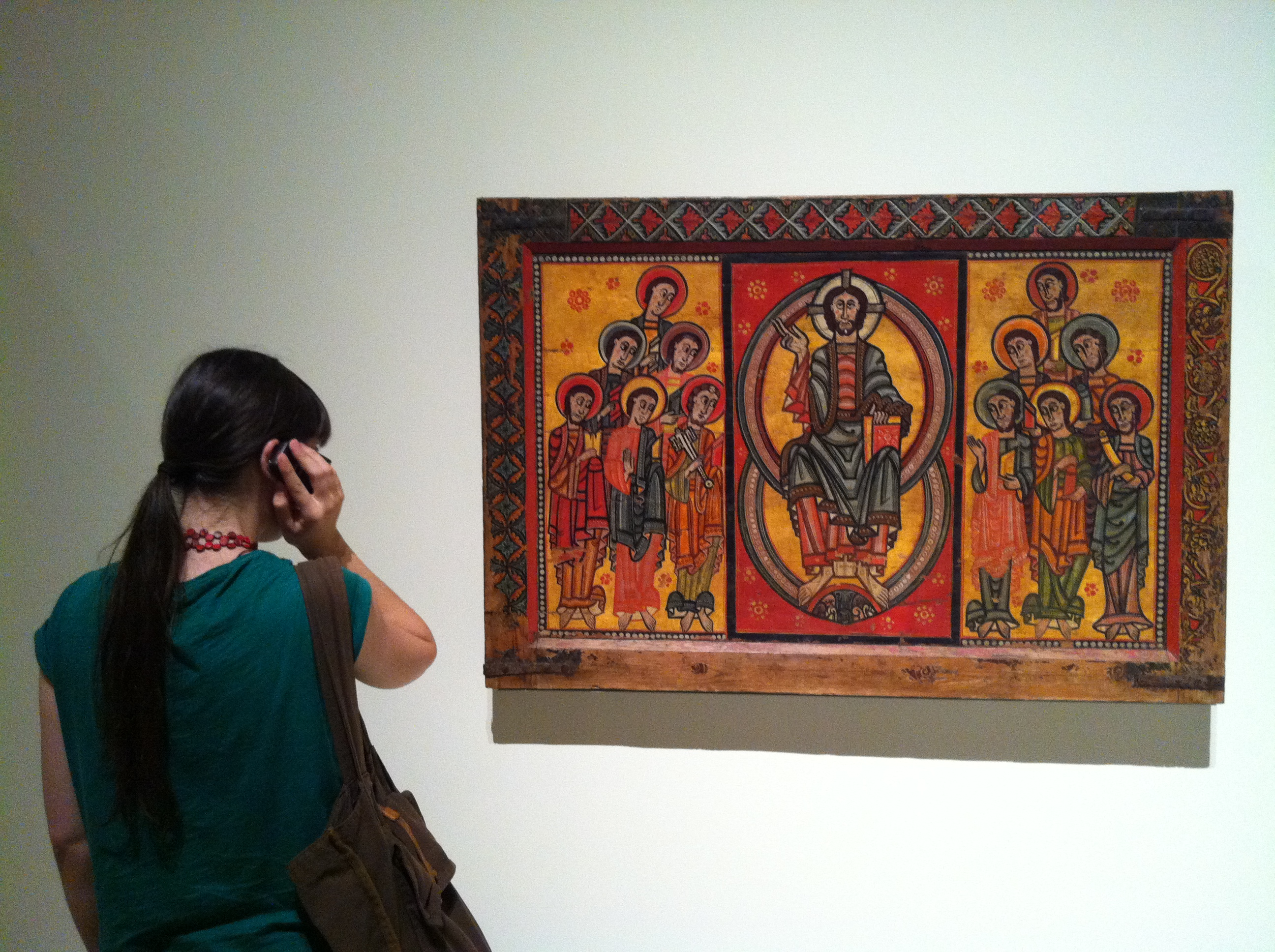
The Frontal exhibited at the Romanesque rooms of Museu Nacional d'Art de Catalunya, in Barcelona.

The composition is presided by the Maiestas Domini, or Christ in Majesty, represented in a double mandorla, typical of earlier Carolingian art. According to the Bible sources inspiring the vision, the Lord's throne is the arc of Heaven and he has the Earth as his footstool. His face is framed by a cruciform halo and his expression is severe. He is holding the Book of Revelation in his left hand and blessing with his right. The Apostles figure in the lateral compartments, arranged in tiered pyramids, an original compositional formula, although it was already known in the art of the Early Empire and also appears in the famous 11th-century Romanesque bibles of Rodes and Ripoll.

The disciples are all addressing the Saviour, either with their eyes or with the inclination of their heads, and are carrying books or scrolls. St Peter, furthermore, is holding the keys. Opposite him, on the other side, is St Paul, with his characteristic bald head. Both the image of Christ and the quality of the yellow and red used and even the bordering on the frame are very similar to those on the frontal from Sant Martí d’Ix, which probably came from the same workshop.

This frontal was painted in tempera on a pine panel. It is one of the most characteristic representations of Catalan Romanesque, showing Romanesque stylistic principles, such as bilateral symmetry and hierarchical geometric forms, as seen in the folds of the clothing. It is also noteworthy for the quality of the polychromy. The work shows similarities, especially with regard to colors and borders, to the frontal of Saint Martin of Ix, indicating that probably they are from the same author or workshop.
