= Bonifacio López Pulido =

Spanish priest of the Roman Catholic Church

Bonifacio López Pulido (Montehermoso, 14 May 1774 – Segovia, 3 December 1827) was a Spanish priest of the Roman Catholic Church, who became bishop of the Diocese of Urgel, and the Diocese of Segovia.

== Biography ==
Born into a poor farming family, on November 15, 1789 he entered the Convent of San Vicente de Plasencia, aged 13 and lived there until he was ordained a priest. In this convent he taught Philosophy and held the Chair of Moral Theology.

He was appointed Teacher of Students in the Monastery of Santa María de Trianos of the Diocese of León. Later he was transferred to Santo Domingo de La Coruña as a reader of Sacred Theology. He was arrested by Napoleon's invading troops, as they considered him a spy, but he escaped execution. He fled to Madrid where he was confessor of the Royal Family and later he was elected prior of the Convent of Our Lady of Atocha. However, on November 4, 1822, the convent was surrounded by national troops. He allowed the soldiers, to search the convent.

On October 28, 1824, the king appointed him Bishop of Urgel and the investiture service took place on March 6, 1825, in the royal chapel. On May 21, 1827 he was promoted bishop of Segovia. On December 3 of that year he died in Segovia with a fever, at the age of fifty-three.

He was a model bishop who followed the rule of Santo Domingo. He was noted there for his assistance to the poor, sick and imprisoned and for his work in the pulpit and confessional.
