= Diocese of Urgell =

Diocese of the Catholic Church in Spain and Andorra

Coordinates: 42.358°N 1.462°E

Diocese of Urgell Diœcesis Urgellensis Diòcesi d'Urgell (ca) Diocèsi d'Urgelh (oc) Diócesis de Urgel (es)

Catholic
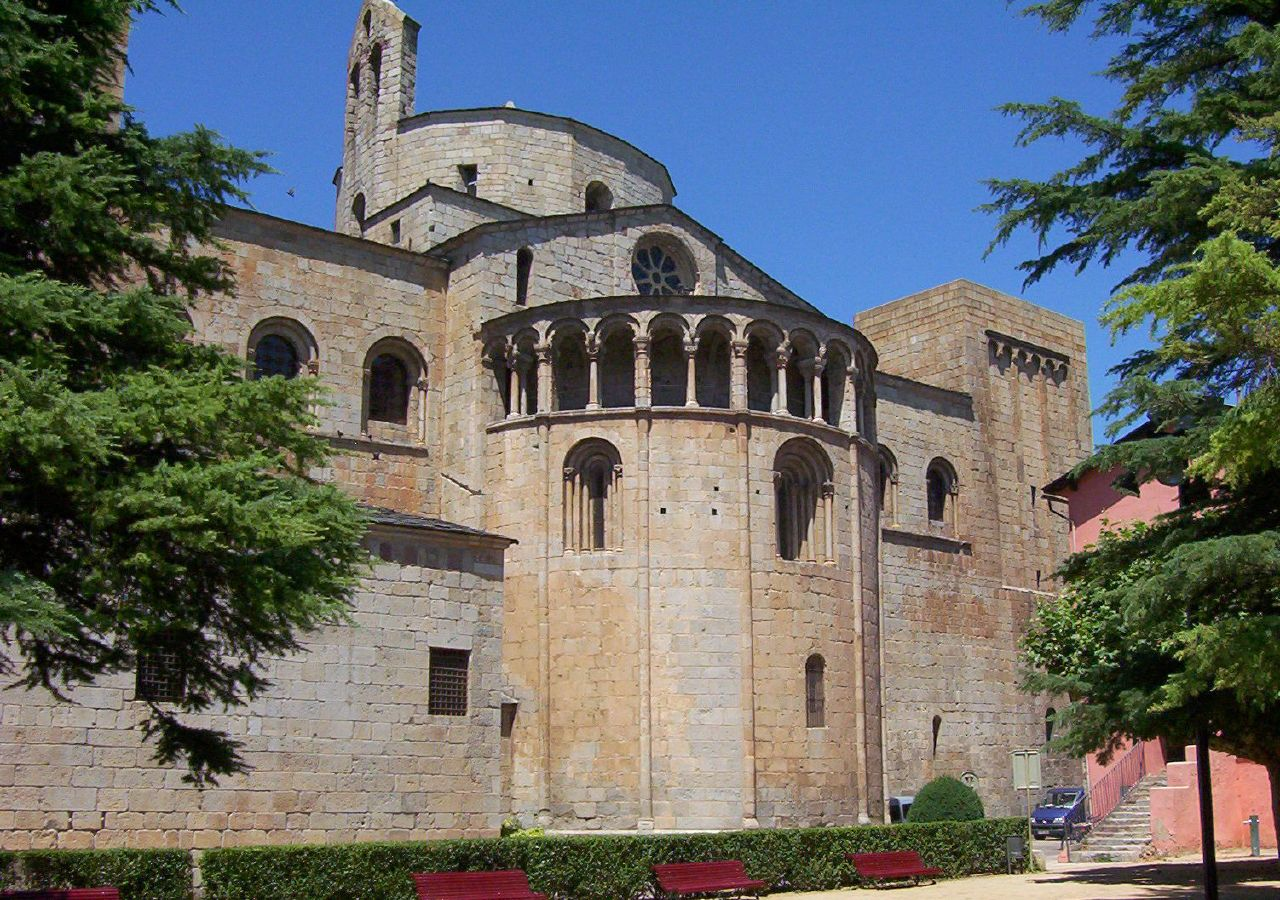
- Cathedral of Santa Maria d'Urgell, Urgell

- Coat of arms

Location
- Country: Spain; Andorra
- Ecclesiastical province: Tarragona
- Metropolitan: Tarragona

Statistics
- Area: 7,630 km^{2} (2,950 sq mi)
- Population: Total; Catholics: (as of 2014); 216,337; 208,486 (96.4%)

Information
- Denomination: Catholic
- Sui iuris church: Latin Church
- Rite: Roman Rite
- Established: 4th Century
- Cathedral: Cathedral of St Mary in La Seu d'Urgell

Current leadership
- Pope: Leo XIV
- Bishop: Josep-Lluís Serrano Pentinat
- Metropolitan Archbishop: Joan Planellas i Barnosell
- Bishops emeritus: Joan Enric Vives i Sicília

Map

Website
- bisbaturgell.org

The Diocese of Urgell (Catalan pronunciation: [uɾˈ(d)ʒeʎ]; Latin: Diœcesis Urgellensis) is a Latin Church diocese of the Catholic Church in Catalonia (Spain) and covering the whole of the sovereign Principality of Andorra. It covers territories including in the historical County of Urgell, and has its origins in the 5th century AD or possibly earlier. It is based in the region of the historical Catalan County of Urgell, though it has different borders. The seat and cathedral of the bishop are situated in the town of la Seu d'Urgell.

Among the most notable events in the history of the diocese are Bishop Felix's adoptionist revolt, the coup of Bishop Esclua, and the overthrowing of the bishop by members of aristocratic families (namely Salla i Ermengol del Conflent, Eribau i Folcs dels Cardona, Guillem Guifré de Cerdanya and Ot de Pallars) between the years 981 and 1122.

Also important is the diocese's connection with Andorra, as the bishop holds the role, ex officio, of co-prince of Andorra; he is, jointly with the president of France (as successor to the French king), co-sovereign of the microstate. This makes the bishop of Urgell the sole extant prince-bishop in the world, other such roles (mostly in parts of the Holy Roman Empire) having ceased over recent centuries. Andorra was ceded to the bishop of Urgell by Count Ermengol VI of Urgell in 1133.

== Diocesan territory ==
The Catholic Church controls the metropolitan church of Tarragona; this is the seat or capital of the Seu d'Urgell (Urgell See). With an area of 7630 km^{2} and a population living in the area of 200,761 (according to the 2000 census), it is the largest of eight bishoprics that have a see in Catalonia. It is also the most sparsely populated. The diocese totally or partially covers the Ripollès, Cerdanya, Alt Urgell, Segarra, Urgell, Pla d'Urgell, Noguera, Pallars Jussà, Pallars Sobirà, Alta Ribagorça, and the Vall d'Aran regions, as well as Andorra.

The diocese borders the bishoprics of Vic, Solsona, Lleida, Barbastro-Monzón, Toulouse, Pamiers, and Perpignan. It has been deeply linked for many years to the regions that constituted the counties of Urgell, Pallars, and Cerdanya during the Middle Ages, with which it identifies and forms historical and geographic connections that are maintained up to the present day.

The bishop's jurisdiction extends to 408 parishes, although today some have a very reduced population. Almost all of the parishes come from distant times, as do the saints for whom their churches are named. The most common dedicatees are Saint Mary (in 90 parochial churches, as well as the cathedral), Saint Peter (35), Saint Martin (29), Saint Saturninus (24), Saint Steven (23), Saint Michael (19), Saint Andrew (17), Saint Julian (12), Saint Eulalia (11), Saint Vincent, and Saint Felix (10). Many churches of the bishopric, parochial or not, conserve elements of great architectural interest, and thirty-six of them are considered cultural monuments of national interest in Spain.

Amongst all Catalan bishoprics, the Diocese of Urgell has experienced the most changes to its borders throughout its existence, mainly for political reasons. These include:

- The loss of Ribagorça (9th century), to the benefit of the Diocese of Roda.
- The cession of 144 parishes of the Berguedà, the Solsonès, and a part of the Segarra, to the benefit of the new diocese of Solsona (1593–1623)
- Later, it was necessary to adapt the territory to the borders between states, and thus in 1803, the 24 parishes of French Cerdagne, which had been ceded to France through the Treaty of the Pyrenees in 1659, also passed ecclesiastically to that country.
- Similarly in 1804, the 28 parishes from the Aran Valley, a territory circumscribed by France yet united fully to the Catalan-Aragonese territories at least since the 12th century, were annexed to the diocese of Urgell, coming from the eliminated Gascon diocese of Saint-Bertrand-de-Comminges.
- In 1874 the sixty-odd towns that formed the erstwhile exempt jurisdictions of Gerri de la Sal, Mur, Montodó-Bonrepòs, the order of Saint John of Jerusalem, and Meià were annexed to the diocese.
- Finally in 1956 the diocese gained the seven parishes of the Artesa de Segre enclave and gave up the 19 of the Franja de Ponent [Western Strip] to Lleida and Barbastre, grouped into three enclaves.

== Origin of the Urgell diocese ==
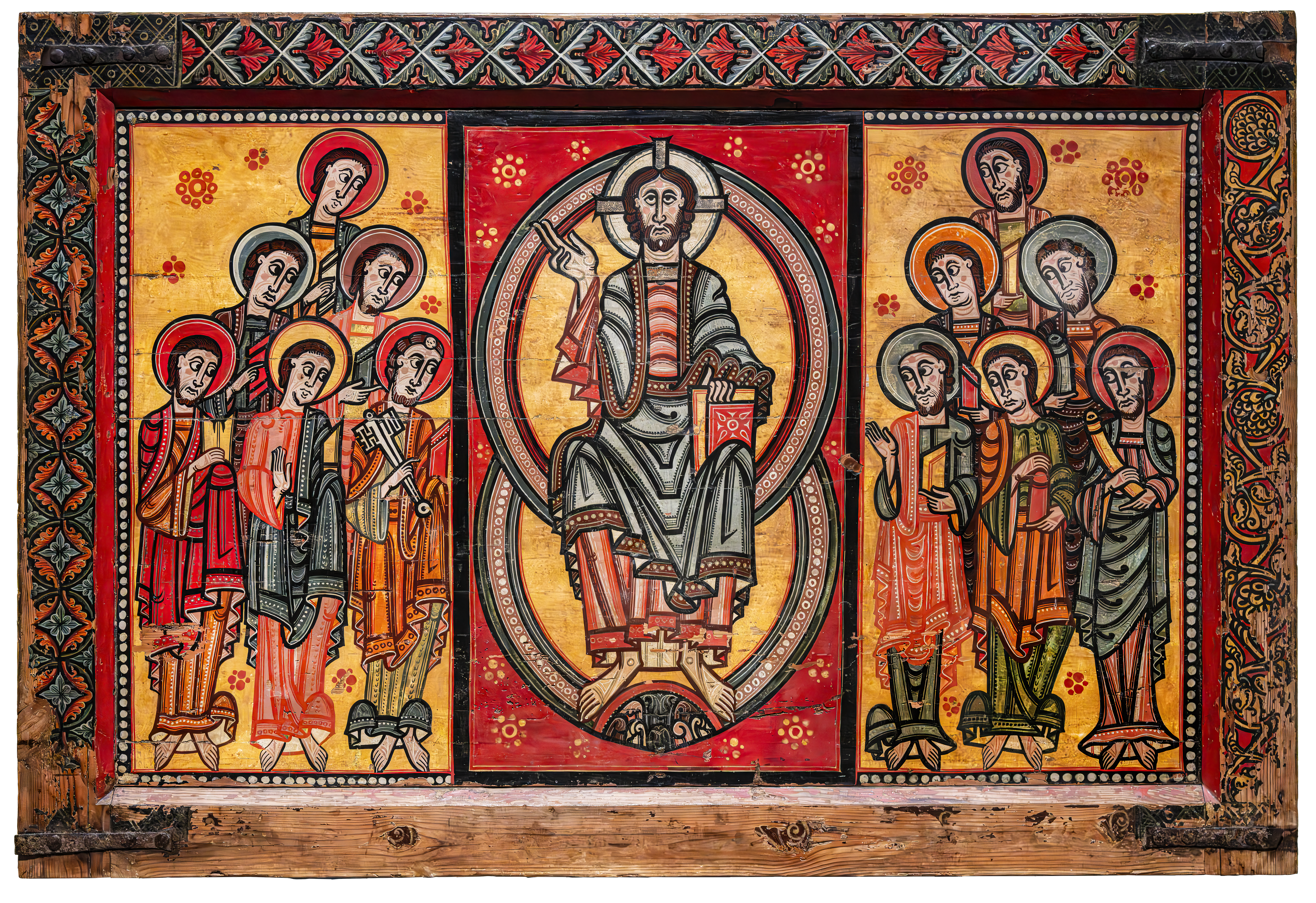
Frontal from La Seu d'Urgell or of The Apostles, now conserved at MNAC Barcelona.

The diocese, without excluding the possibility of a more remote origin, was already constituted at the beginning of the 6th century. The first known bishop, Saint Justus, figures among the participants of the councils of Toledo (531), Lleida, and Valencia (546). His successors also took part regularly in the Toledo councils celebrated throughout the 7th century. The Episcopal succession, despite the uncertainty of names and chronology, seems not to have been interrupted by the Saracen invasion of 714.

Monasticism must have been introduced into the diocese during the Visigothic period. The monasteries of Tavèrnoles, Gerri, Codinet, and Tresponts probably date prior to the Saracen invasion. These foundations and the later ones—la Vedella, Elins, Bagà, la Portella, les Maleses, Villanega, Oveix, Bellera, el Burgal, Lavaix, Alaó, Escales, Ovarra, Taverna, Gualter, etc.—often adopted the Benedictine observance from the 9th century on, following the example of the majority of the coenobitic monasteries then extant in the Marca Hispanica. This became the norm for monastic life in the following century. These monasteries, alongside the parochial and canonical organization (the Urgell Diocese, Solsona, Cardona, Organyà, Ponts, Ager, Mur, Tremp) would greatly influence the Christianization of the country and its human, cultural, and economic development.

The canonical monasteries developed into colleges as a result of their secularization (1592), and due to their corruption, the 1851 concord eliminated them, along with the other pre-existing ones (Castellbò, Guissona, Balaguer). Mur and Àger were without a doubt the most famous Catalan canonical colleges exempt from episcopal jurisdiction.

== Early Middle Ages ==
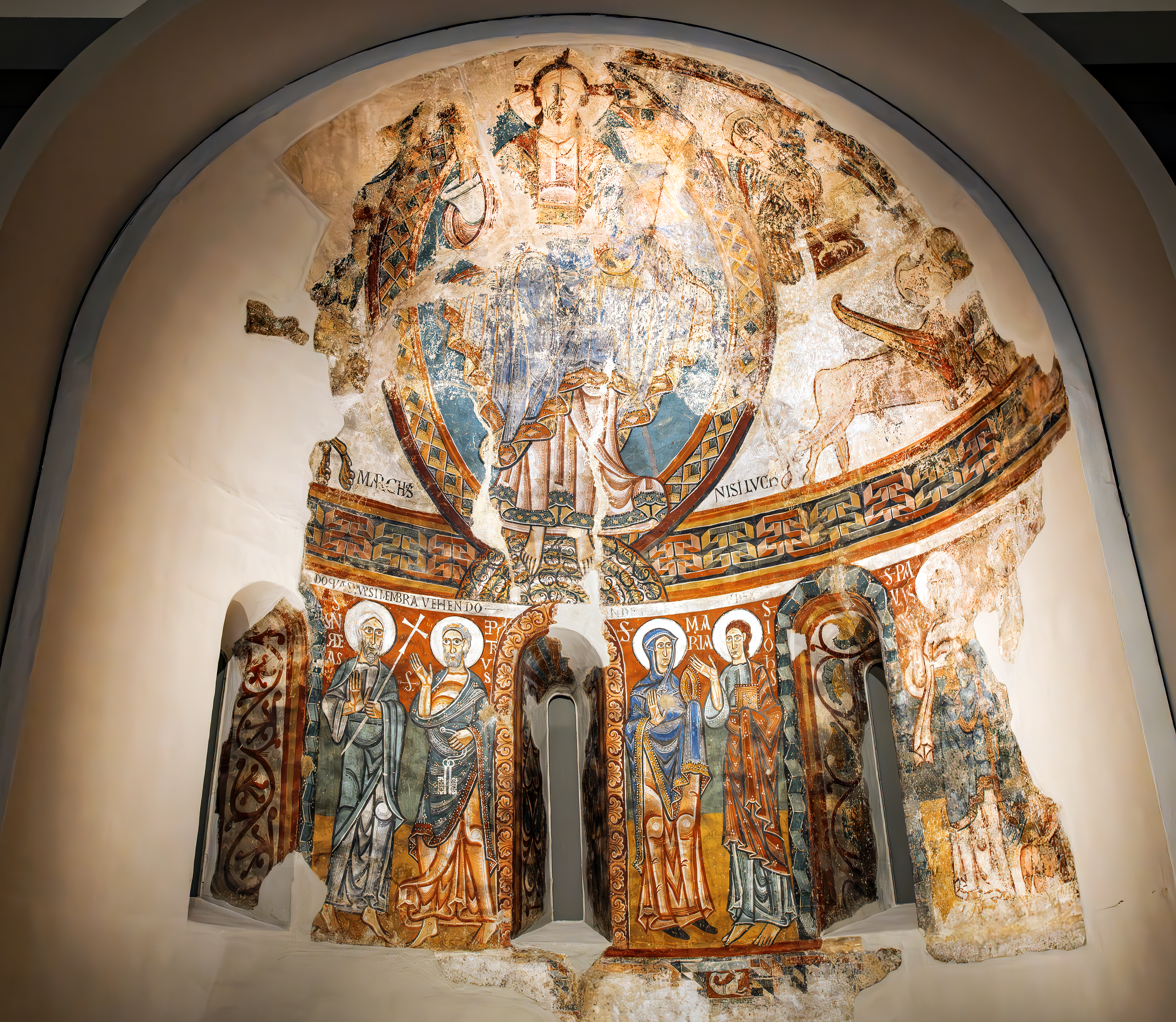
Apse from La Seu d'Urgell.

In the first decade of the Umayyad conquest of Hispania, Berber troops set up garrisons on the northernmost hilly regions and towns. Uthman ibn Naissa settled down in Cerdanya, killed the bishop of Urgell, and rebelled against central Cordovan rule in 730. The Berber lord was killed in 731, and the region was subdued by Abd al-Rahman al-Ghafiqi.

During the episcopacy of the Bishop Felix (781–799), who was accused of adoptionism by the Carolingian theologians and for this motive deposed and confined to Lyon, the city of Urgell and its church were completely destroyed by the Arabs around 793. With the founding of the Marca Hispanica, the diocese, like the others recently restored, became part of the ecclesiastical province of Narbonne until the re-creation of the metropolitan see of Tarragona in 1091. The Frankish kings intervened effectively in the country's reconstruction, promoting the Reconquest and laying the foundations of its government. The territory now being mainly free from the Moors' power, and with the help of the first Catalan Counts, they promoted the construction of a new cathedral, completed in the second part of the 9th century, to which were assigned 289 towns or villages — all in the northwestern area of the Pyrenees.

At the same time, the Urgell church, ruled for more than two centuries (914–1122) by members of the Counts' families, fully entered the ring of the feudal system, allowing it to shape for itself an extensive seigniorial patrimony: including, among other cities and territories, the city of Urgell; the valleys of Andorra, the Vall de la Llosa, the Vall d'Arques, and the Ribera Salada; the villages of Sanaüja, Guissona, and, from 1257 onwards, Tremp. This, however, forced it into a certain dependence on the superior power of the counts. Also, the Gregorian Reform, introduced to the County of Urgell during the last years of the 11th century and preceded by the change of the Visigothic rite for the Roman rite, reduced those interventions of the laymen in ecclesiastical affairs and achieved the complete freedom of the Church in the spiritual and temporal domains. Moreover, the maintenance of those possessions were the source of constant tension and fighting throughout the Middle Ages with the viscounts of Castellbó and his heirs, the counts of Foix.

== List of bishops of Urgell ==
- Justus I, before 527 – after 546
- Epigan c. 550
- Marcel I c.570
- Simplici 589–599
- Gabila c. 604
- Ranarius c. 633
- Meurell 653–665
- Leuderic I 665–683
- Jacint ? 672–680 ?
- Leuberic 683–693
- Urbici 693–704
- Marcel II 704–721
- Justus II 721–733
- Nambaudus or Anambad ? 733–731
- Leuderic II 732–754
- Esteve 754–765
- Dotila 765–783
- Felix 783–792
- Radulf 792–798
- Felix (second time) 798–799
- ...
- Posedoni 814–823
- ...
- Sisebut 833–840
- Florenci 840–850
- Beat 850–857
- Guisad I 857–872
- Golderic 872–885
- Esclua 885–892
- Ingobert 893–900
- Nantigis 900–914
- Trigilbert 914
- Radulf 914–940
- Guisad II 940–981
- Sal.la 981–1010
- Ermengol 1010–1035
- Eribau 1035–1040
- Guillem Guifredo 1040–1075
- Bernat Guillermo 1075–1092
- Folc II of Cardona 1092–1095
- Guillem Arnau 1092–1095
- Ot 1095–1122
- Pere Berenguer 1122–1141
- Bernat Sanç 1141–1162
- Bernat Roger 1162–1166
- Arnau de Preixens 1166–1195
- Bernat de Castelló 1195–1198
- Bernat de Vilamur 1198–1203
- Pere de Puigvert 1203–1230
- Ponç de Vilamur 1230–1257
- Abril Pérez Peláez 1257–1269
- Pere d'Urtx 1269–1293
- Guillem de Montcada 1295–1308
- Ramon Trebaylla 1308–1326
- Arnau de Llordat 1326–1341
- Pere de Narbona 1341–1348
- Niccoló Capocci 1348–1351
- Hug Desbac 1351–1361
- Guillem Arnau i Palau 1361–1364
- Pedro Martínez Luna 1364–1370
- Berenguer d'Erill i de Pallars 1370–1387
- Galcerà de Vilanova 1387–1415
- Francesc de Tovia 1415–1436
- Arnau Roger de Pallars 1436–1461
- Jaume de Cardona i Gandia 1461–1466
- Roderic de Borja i Escrivà 1467–1472
- Pere Folc de Cardona 1472–1515
- Joan d'Espés 1515–1530
- Vacant 1530–1532
- Pedro Jordán de Urries 1532–1533
- Francisco de Urríes 1533–1551
- Joan Punyet 1551–1553
- Miquel Despuig 1553–1556
- Juan Pérez Garcia de Oliván 1556–1560
- Pere de Castellet 1561–1571
- Joan Dimes Lloris 1571–1576
- Vacant 1576–1578
- Miquel Jeroni Morell 1578–1579
- Hugo Ambrosio de Moncada 1579–1586
- Vacant 1586–1588
- Andreu Capella 1588–1609
- Bernat de Salba i Salba 1609–1620
- Vacant 1620–1622
- Luis Díez de Aux y Armendáriz 1622–1627
- Antonio Pérez (archbishop) 1627–1632
- Vacant 1632–1634
- Pau Duran 1634–1651
- Vacant 1651–1655 (due to war)
- Juan Manuel de Espinosa 1655–1663
- Vacant 1663–1664
- Melcior Palau i Bosca 1664–1670
- Vacant 1670–1671
- Pere de Copons i Teixidor 1671–1681
- Vacant 1681–1682
- Joan Baptista Desbac i Mortorell 1682–1688
- Vacant 1688–1689
- Oleguer de Montserrat i Rufet 1689–1694
- Julià Cano Thebar 1695–1714
- Simeó de Guinda i Apeztegui 1714–1737
- Jordi Curado i Torreblanca 1738–1747
- Sebastià de Victoria Emparán y Loyola 1747–1756
- Francesc Josep Catalán de Ocón 1757–1762
- Francesc Fernández de Xátiva y Contreras 1763–1771
- Joaquín de Santiyán y Valdivielso 1771–1779
- Juan de García y Montenegro 1780–1783
- Josep de Boltas 1785–1795
- Francesc Antoni de la Dueña y Cisneros 1797–1816
- Bernat Francés Caballero i Mathet 1817–1824
- Bonifaci López i Pulido 1824–1827
- Simó de Guardiola i Hortoneda 1827–1851
- Josep Caixal i Estradé 1853–1879
- Salvador Casañas y Pagés 1879–1901
- Ramon Riu i Cabanes 1901
- Toribio Martín (Diocesan administrator)^{1}1902
- Joan Josep Laguarda i Fenollera 1902–1906
- Josep Pujargimzú (Vicar capitular)^{1} 1907
- Juan Benlloch i Vivó 1907–1919
- Jaume Viladrich i Gaspa (Vicar capitular)^{1} 1919–1920
- Justí Guitart i Vilardebó 1920–1940
- Ricard Fornesa i Puigdemasa (Vicar capitular)^{1} 1940–1943
- Ramon Iglesias i Navarri 1943–1969
- Ramon Malla Call (Apostolic Administrator)^{1} 1969–1971
- Joan Martí i Alanis 1971–2003
- Joan Enric Vives Sicília (Archbishop, personal title) 2003–2025
- Josep-Lluís Serrano Pentinat (coadjutor bishop) 2024–2025, (bishop) 2025–present

^{1} During a sede vacante.

== See also ==
- List of co-princes of Andorra
