= Arnau de Llordà =

Co-Prince of Andorra

- Bishop of Tortosa
- Native name: Arnau de Llordat
- Church: Catholic Church
- Diocese: Diocese of Tortosa
- Installed: 3 October 1341
- Term ended: 3 May 1346
- Other post: Bishop of Urgell (1326–1341)

Personal details
- Born: Arnau Guillem de Llordà
- Died: 3 May 1346 Tortosa, Principality of Catalonia, Crown of Aragon

Arnau de Llordà was a Bishop of Urgell who served as Episcopal Co-Prince of Andorra from 1326 to 1341. He served alongside French Co-Prince Gaston II of Foix-Béarne. He held a Synod in April 1343 as the Bishop of Tortosa.
