= Guissona =

- Municipality
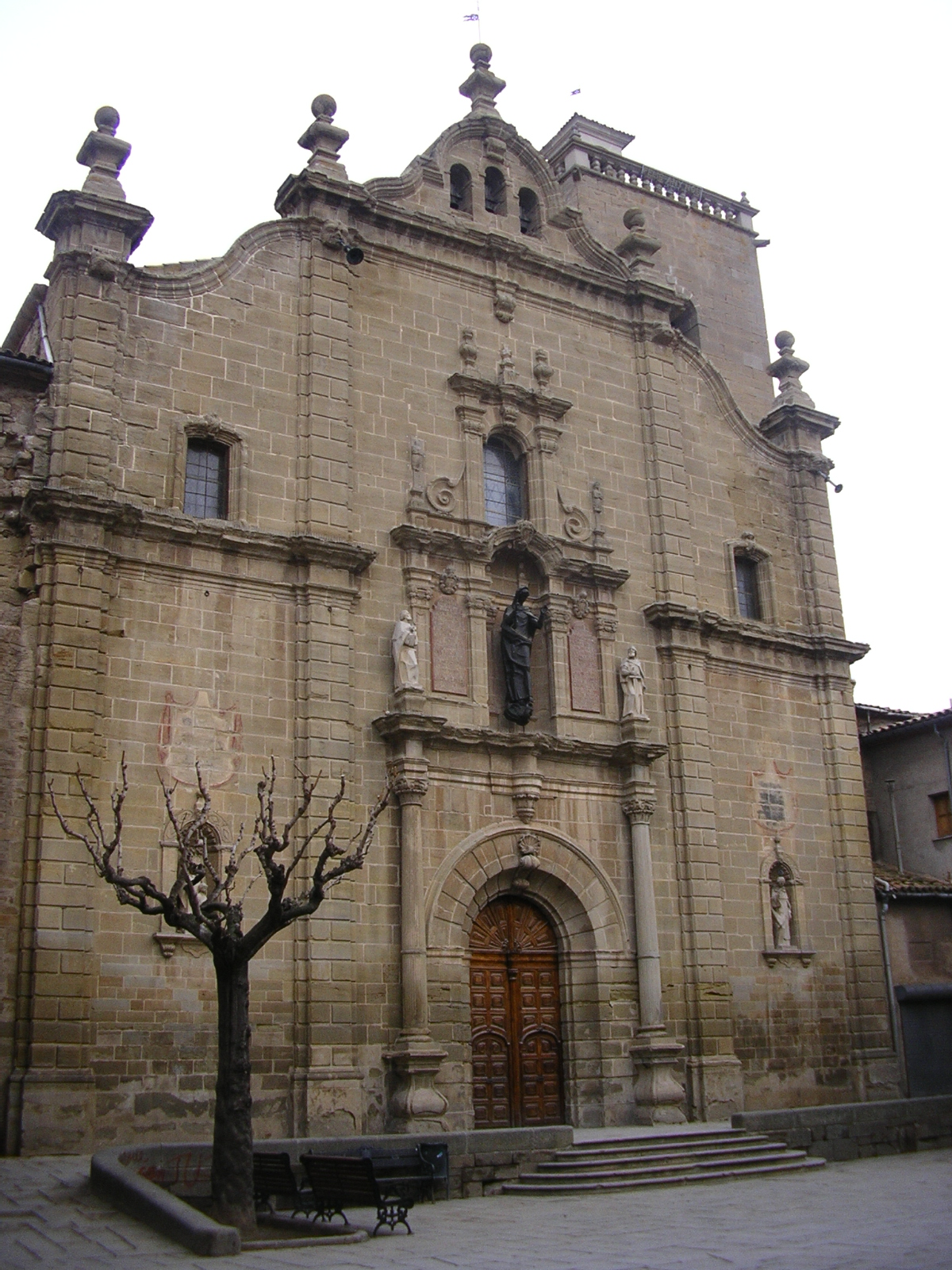
- Guissona - Església de Santa Maria (Saint Mary's Church)

- Flag Coat of arms

- Location within Lleida Location in Catalonia Location of Guissona within Spain
- Coordinates: 41°47′13″N 1°17′24″E
- Country: Spain
- Autonomous community: Catalunya
- Province: Lleida
- Comarca: Segarra
- Established: 2007

Government
  - Type: Mayor–council
  - Mayor: Jaume Ars I Bosch (2019) (Junts)

Area
  - Total: 18.1 km^{2} (7.0 sq mi)
- Elevation: 485 m (1,591 ft)

Population (2025-01-01)
  - Total: 7,774
  - Density: 430/km^{2} (1,110/sq mi)
- Demonym: guissonenc/guissonenca
- Postcode: 25210
- Website: www.guissona.cat

Guissona (Catalan pronunciation: [giˈsona]) is a town and municipality located in the north of the comarca (county) of Segarra, in the Province of Lleida, Catalonia, Spain. With a population of 7,774 (register office, 2025) and a rapid demographic growth (5,170 inhabitants in 2010) Guissona is the principal municipality in the northern half of Segarra and the second most populated in the county after Cervera (9,603). In addition to the populated place of Guissona, the municipality integrates the smaller place of Guarda-si-venes (31 inhabitants in 2007). The municipality is split into two parts, the bigger eastern part containing almost all the population.

In the last half century, the town has experienced an important economic development mainly due to meat production and the creation of a meat packing industry. Such development has run parallel to a fast demographic growth, from 3,060 inhabitants in 1998 to 6,145 in 2010. As a consequence, the municipality accounts for the highest percentage of immigrant population registered in the whole province.

== Economy ==
The economy of Guissona is based on farming (plant crops, animal husbandry) and the food processing industry. Guissona is the baseof Grup Alimentari Guissona, an industrial and financial conglomerate originally created as an agricultural marketing cooperative, that distributes and commercializes the products of the area in its own chain stores.

== Demographics ==
A table with the total population registered in Guissona in different years since 1497:

Historical population

Year	Pop.	±% p.a.
1497	149	—
1515	193	+1.45%
1553	193	+0.00%
1717	595	+0.69%
1787	881	+0.56%
1857	2,241	+1.34%
1877	1,984	−0.61%
1887	2,046	+0.31%
1900	1,668	−1.56%

Year	Pop.	±% p.a.
1910	1,635	−0.20%
1920	1,716	+0.48%
1930	1,774	+0.33%
1940	1,692	−0.47%
1950	1,919	+1.27%
1960	1,953	+0.18%
1970	2,085	+0.66%
1981	2,599	+2.02%
1990	2,648	+0.21%

Year	Pop.	±% p.a.
1992	2,720	+1.35%
1994	2,899	+3.24%
1996	2,928	+0.50%
1998	3,060	+2.23%
2000	3,339	+4.46%
2002	3,745	+5.91%
2004	4,439	+8.87%
2006	5,139	+7.60%
2009	6,145	+6.14%

== History ==
The first settlement known is the Iberian town of Iesso dating back to the early Iron Age (8th-9th century BC). Iesso was located in the Northern area of the present town (Plaça del Vell Pla). The coinage minted by the Iberian settlement, of which a few examples are found within the Iberian coin collection of the British Museum, include an unidentified Male head, to the right and to left a club and an inscription. The reverse depicts a Horseman with a palm to the right and an Iberian inscription reading ieso below. These date from the late 2nd to the early 1st century BC.

The Romans conquered Iesso to transform it into a municipality. The town is mentioned by the Roman authors Pliny the Elder and Ptolemy. During that period a defensive wall was built that surrounded a more extensive surface than the present historic center. The remains of the Roman period are numerous, notably, the Roman thermae of the city. The archeological site includes the water supply of the actual Medieval enclosure, the wells of the public fountain, a number of headstones (e.g., the gravestone of Servilla Praepusa (2nd-3rd century AD), a sculpture of a Roman horseman, and the necropolis located in the area of Cal Mines.

Guissona probably housed the episcopal see until it was moved to La Seu d'Urgell as a consequence of the Muslim invasion of the area. In 975 AD the Christian Borrell II, Count of Barcelona conquered the town, although the Caliphate of Córdoba would conquer it back in 1015. By 1024, Guissona was recaptured and a rechristianization was instituted by Ermengol, bishop of Urgell.

In 1072, the Count Ermengol IV of Urgell started the construction of a Romanesque church named Església de Santa Maria de Guissona (Church of Saint Mary of Guissona). Several centuries later, the church was knocked down to build the new church. The construction of the church extended along the 17th and 18th centuries, the opening ceremony was in 1800. The final work would be a mixture of different phases of Baroque (altars, organ, choir stalls) and Neoclassical styles. During the Spanish Civil War, the organ and all the retables were destroyed.

In 1505, the construction started of Obra de Fluvià (or alternatively called Obra de santa Llúcia) in an estate previously acquired by the Bishop of Urgell, a building planned to be a residence for the Bishop. In 1514, the works were interrupted. Its remains are located a kilometre away to the northeast, near the confluence of the Fluvià River and its tributary, the Sió River. The remaining architectonic elements were made in a late Gothic style. The building was constructed on a squared floor plan with a central courtyard. The Diocese of Urgell also founded an Augustinian monastery, transformed into a secular collegiate church in the 15th century.

On 12 June 1837, there was a battle near the town fought by Carlist forces against the "Liberals" during the First Carlist War. The Carlist army commanded by the Infante Sebastian of Portugal and Spain was defeated by the Baron of Meer, general-in-chief of the military region of Catalonia. The Carlist army had previously left Navarre with the Carlist pretender of the crown, Carlos María Isidro de Borbón (the "Royal Expedition").

== Alumni ==
Pedro Fages Beleta (Catalan: Pere Fages i Beleta) (1734–1794), nicknamed El Oso (The Bear): soldier, explorer and the second military Governor of California Nueva (later known as Alta California) from 1770 to 1774, and governor of Las Californias from 1782 to 1791.

== Main sights ==
- Remains of the Medieval defensive walls, including one of the gates.
- La Plaça Major (Town square), a square surrounded by arcades.
- Església de Santa Maria (Saint Mary's Church) with Baroque and Neoclassical architectonic elements.
- Municipal Museum, housing a collection of artifacts of archeological interest, pottery and art objects (paintings and sculpture.)
- "Obra de Fluvià", the ruins of the unfinished Episcopal palace built in the 16th century. Late Gothic style. Located in the rural-urban fringe of the town.
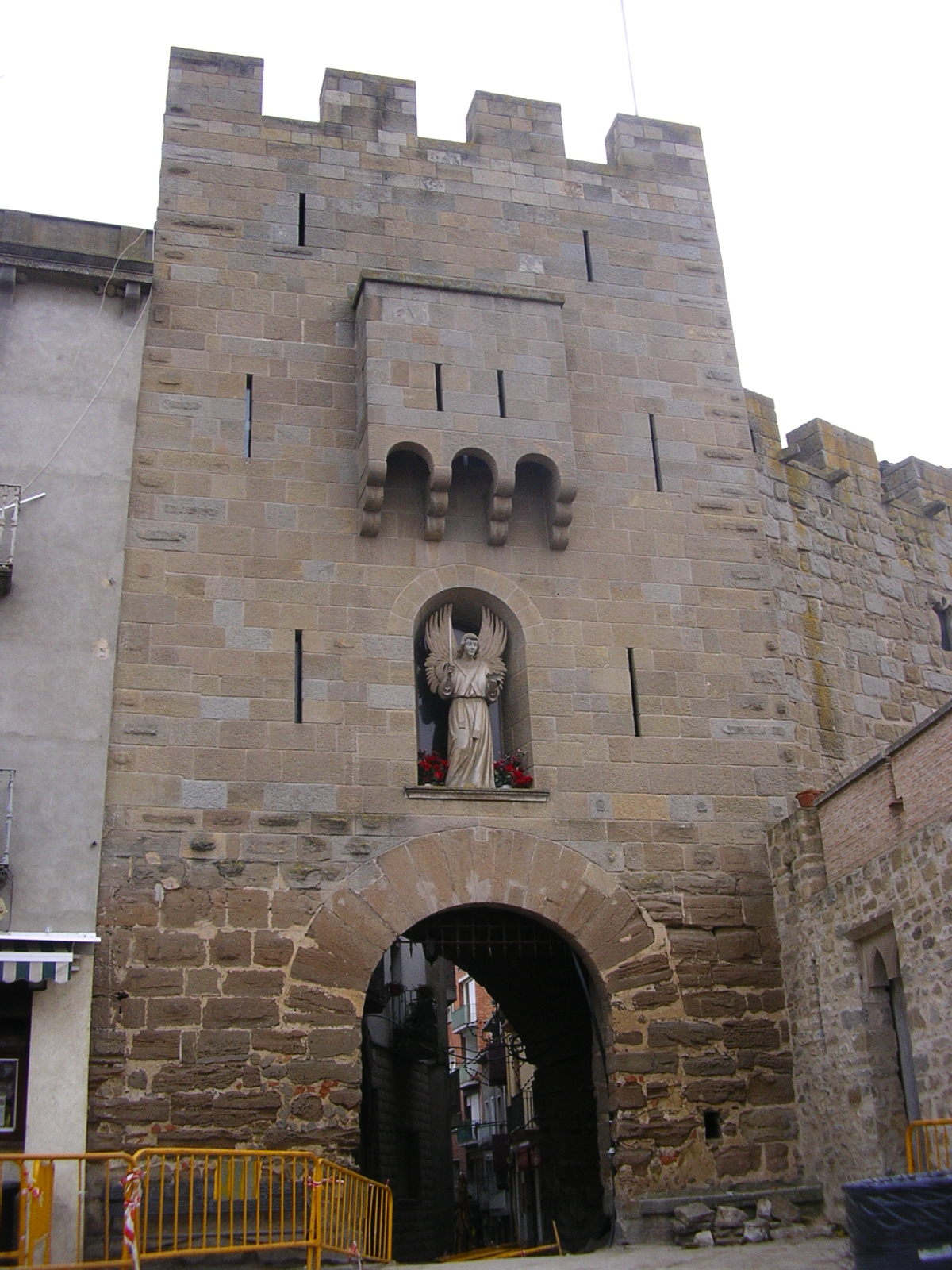
Guissona - El Portal (The Portal)

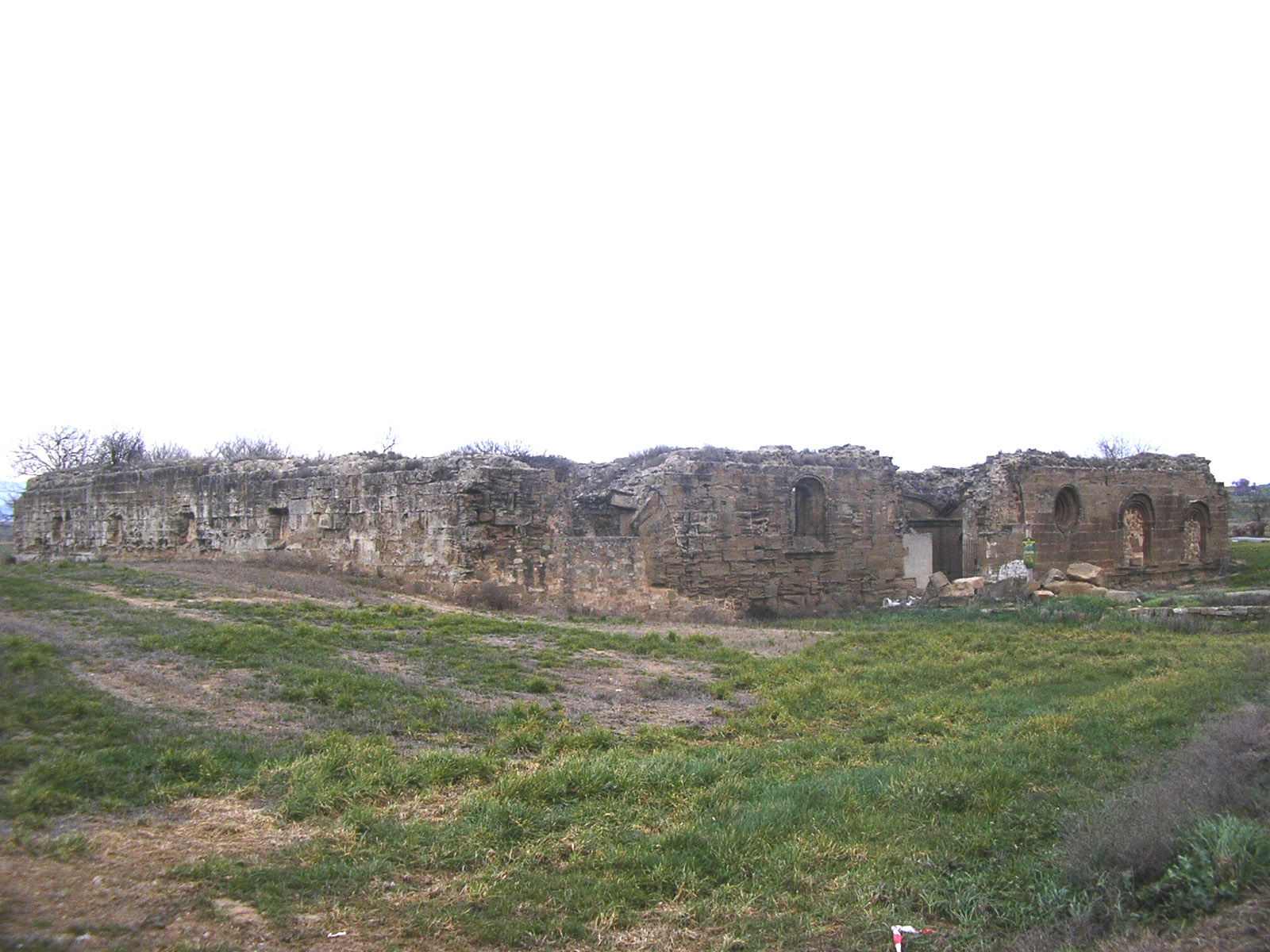
Guissona - Obra de Fluvià, the unfinished Episcopal Palace, 16th century

== See also ==
- Torà (the closest town, Northeast to Guissona, some 10 km away.)
