= Co-princes of Andorra =

Joint heads of state

Co-Princes of Andorra
- Coprínceps d'Andorra (Catalan)
- Coat of arms of High Authorities of Andorra

Incumbent
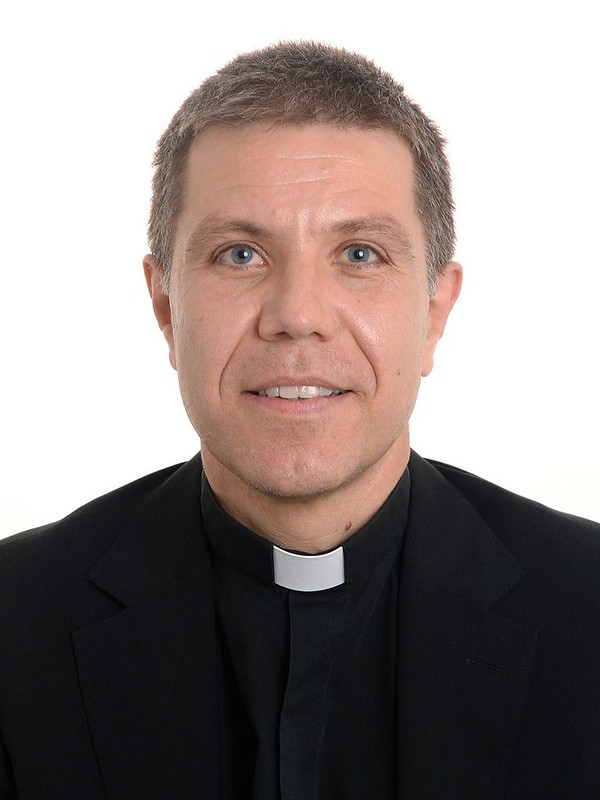
- Josep-Lluís Serrano Pentinat since 31 May 2025

Co-incumbent
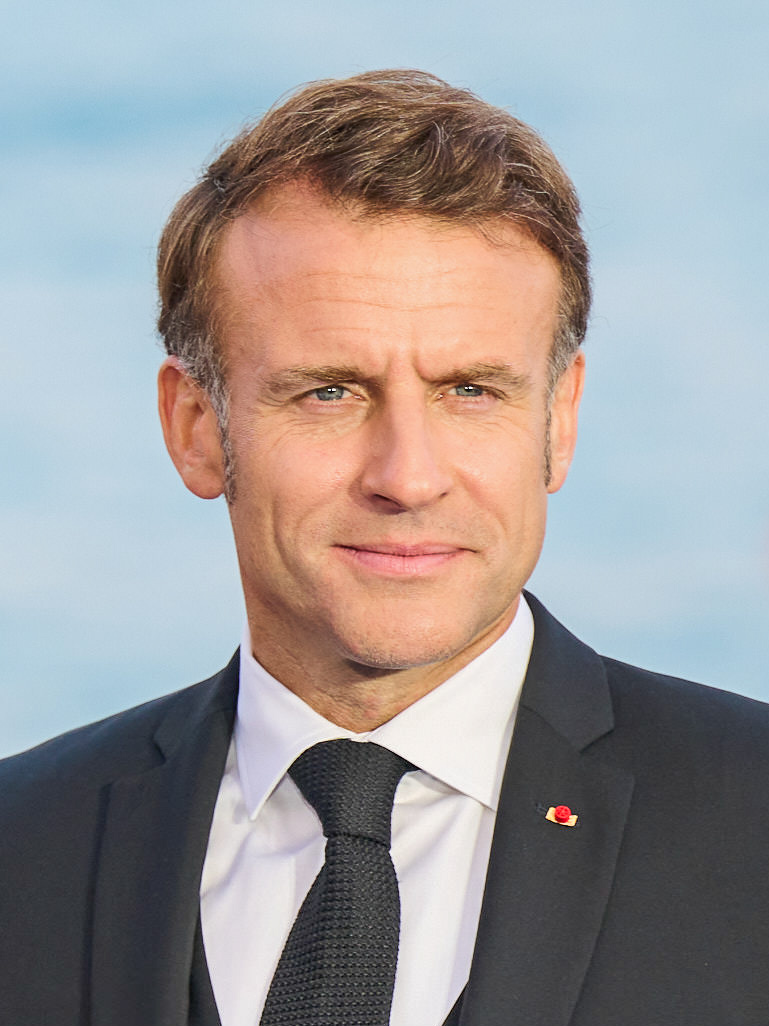
- Emmanuel Macron since 14 May 2017

Details
- Style: His Excellency
- First monarch: Pere d'Urtx; Roger-Bernard III
- Formed: 1278; 748 years ago
- Residences: La Seu d'Urgell Cathedral (Catalonia, Spain); Élysée Palace (France)
- Appointer: The Pope (for the Episcopal Co-Prince); French citizens (five years, renewable once consecutively) (for the Lay Co-Prince)

The co-princes of Andorra are jointly the heads of state (Catalan: cap d'estat) of the Principality of Andorra, a landlocked microstate lying in the Pyrenees between France and Spain. The co-princes are the bishop of Urgell and the president of France.

Founded in 1278 by a treaty between the bishop of Urgell and the count of Foix, this unique diarchical arrangement has persisted through the Middle Ages to the present. Following the transfer of the count of Foix's claims to the Crown of France and, subsequently, to the head of state of the French Republic, the current arrangement has the bishop of Urgell (Josep-Lluís Serrano Pentinat) serving as the episcopal co-prince and the president of France (Emmanuel Macron) as the lay co-prince. Each co-prince appoints a personal representative. The episcopal co-prince is currently represented by Eduard Ibáñez and the lay co-prince by Frédéric Rose.

== History ==
=== Origin of the co-lordship ===
Tradition holds that Charlemagne granted a charter to the Andorran people in return for their fighting against the Moors. The feudal overlord of this territory was at first the count of Urgell. In 988, the count, Borrell II, gave Andorra to the Diocese of Urgell in exchange for land in Cerdanya. The bishop of Urgell, based in Seu d'Urgell, has ruled Andorra ever since.

Before 1095, Andorra did not have any type of military protection, and since the bishop of Urgell knew that the count of Urgell wanted to reclaim the Andorran valleys, he asked for help from the lord of Caboet. In 1095, the lord and the bishop signed a declaration of their co-sovereignty over Andorra. Arnalda, daughter of Arnau of Caboet, married the viscount of Castellbò, and both became viscounts of Castellbò and Cerdanya. Their daughter, Ermessenda, married Roger Bernat II, the French count of Foix. They became, respectively, Count and Countess of Foix, Viscount and Viscountess of Castellbò and Cerdanya, and also co-sovereigns of Andorra (together with the bishop of Urgell).

In the 11th century, a dispute arose between the bishop of Urgell and the count of Foix. The conflict was mediated by the sovereign of those lands, the monarch of Aragon in 1278, and led to the signing of the first paréage, which provided that Andorra's lordship be shared between the count and the bishop. This gave to Andorra its territory and political form, and marked the formal commencement of Andorra's unique diarchical arrangement, initially as a lordship within the Principality of Catalonia.

=== Development towards a co-principality ===
Through inheritance, the Foix title to Andorra passed to the kings of Navarre. After Henry III of Navarre was crowned Henry IV of France, he issued an edict in 1607 establishing the king of France and the Bishop of Urgell as co-lords of Andorra. From the last quarter of the 17th century onwards, as political ties with the Principality of Catalonia and the Monarchy of Spain progressively weakened, the co-lords began to be referred and act as "co-princes" (co-sovereigns), a political arrangement that still holds. In order to avoid the application of the 1716 Nueva Planta decree of Catalonia (which abolished Catalan legal system and its status of separate state enjoyed until then) to Andorra, the Bishop of Urgell, Simeón de Guinda, convinced the new Spanish Bourbon authorities that the Valleys of Andorra had been neutral and unrelated to the Principality of Catalonia, resulting in the definitive political separation of Andorra from Catalonia.

In 1812–13, the First French Empire under Napoleon annexed Catalonia and divided it into four départements, with Andorra forming part of the district of Puigcerdà (department of Sègre). Following the defeat of Napoleon, a royal decree reversed this annexation, and Andorra reverted to its former independence and political state. The French head of state—whether king, emperor, or president—has continued to serve as a co-prince of Andorra ever since.

=== 20th century ===
On 12 July 1934, Andorra's monarchical system was challenged by an adventurer named Boris Skossyreff, who issued a proclamation in Urgell declaring himself "Boris I, King of Andorra". Though initially enjoying some support within Andorra's political establishment, he was ultimately arrested by Spanish authorities on 20 July 1934 after declaring war on the Bishop of Urgell (who had refused to relinquish his own claim to the principality). Skossyreff was expelled, and was never considered to have been the Andorran monarch in any legal sense.

Before 1993, Andorra had no codified constitution, and the exact prerogatives of the co-princes were not specifically defined in law. In March 1993, a Constitution was approved by a vote of the Andorran people and signed into law by the two reigning co-princes at the time, Bishop Joan Martí Alanis and President François Mitterrand. It clarified the continuance of the unique Andorran diarchy, and also delineated the precise role and prerogatives of the two co-princes. Prior to adoption of the Constitution, Andorra paid in odd-numbered years a tribute of approximately $460 to the French ruler, while in even-numbered years, it paid a tribute of approximately $12 to the Catalan bishop, plus six hams, six cheeses, and six live chickens. This medieval custom was subsequently abandoned in 1993.

=== 21st century ===
In 2009, French president Nicolas Sarkozy threatened to abdicate as lay co-prince if the principality did not change its banking laws to eliminate its longstanding status as a tax haven. The European Union also applied pressure to bring its tax laws into alignment with its taxation norms, and from 2013 to 2016 Andorra made reforms, including a personal income tax, a general indirect tax, and an end to its banking secrecy policies.

In 2014, Joan Enric Vives i Sicília said that he would abdicate as bishop of Urgell and co-prince of Andorra if the Andorran Parliament passed a law legalizing abortion. The bishopric would then be held in abeyance at least until the law had been promulgated, so that no cleric would have to sign it. This would make Andorra the second country (after Belgium) where a head of state refused to sign a law legalizing abortion without preventing the law's promulgation. The legislative standoff was substantially de-escalated in 2018 when Pope Francis affirmed that Vives would need to abdicate if the law was passed, and abortion remains illegal in Andorra. Activism has continued to try to change that.

== Constitutional role ==
The Constitution of Andorra carefully defines the contemporary role and prerogatives of the co-princes of Andorra. The Constitution establishes Andorra as a "parliamentary coprincipality", providing for the bishop of Urgell and the president of France to serve together as joint heads of state. The Constitution distinguishes between two sources of princely authority: ministerial powers under Article 45 which require the countersignature of the head of Government or the syndic general, the speaker of the Andorran parliament; and discretionary powers that the co-princes may exercise in their own deliberate judgment per Article 46.

=== Ministerial powers ===
A number of functions relevant to the basic functioning of the Andorran state are reposed in the co-princes. When performing these functions, the co-princes act on the advice of either the syndic general or the prime minister, who then bear legal responsibility as the countersigning parties. With respect to Government formation, the co-princes appoint the prime minister as elected by the General Council and with the syndic general's countersignature. All other ministerial powers are exercised on the advice of the head of Government or the relevant minister, pursuant to Article 75. Those functions include:

- Calling for elections or referendums in accordance with constitutional provisions;
- Dissolving the General Council prior to the expiration of its current term (but not until at least one year has passed since the prior election);
- Accrediting diplomatic representatives from Andorra to foreign states, and receiving credentials of foreign representatives to Andorra; (Note: This implies that the letters of credence of ambassadors of France to Andorra or vice-versa are signed twice by the French president: once as sender and once as recipient.)
- Appointing office-holders in accordance with appropriate constitutional provisions;
- Sanctioning and enacting laws in accordance with constitutional provisions; and
- Granting formal consent to international treaties, once ratified by the General Council.

=== Discretionary powers ===
There are limited circumstances where the co-princes may perform functions in their own deliberate judgment. Those discretionary powers are as follows:

- Joint exercise of the "prerogative of grace" (the power to pardon);
- Each co-prince may appoint one member of the Superior Council of Justice and one member of the Constitutional Tribunal;
- Establishment of such services as they deem necessary to fulfil their constitutional prerogatives, and appointment of individuals to fulfil these services;
- Requesting a preliminary judgement on the constitutionality of proposed laws, or of international treaties;
- Agreeing to the text of any international treaty, prior to submitting it for parliamentary approval;
- Bringing a case before the Constitutional Tribunal in the event of any conflict over the exercise of their constitutional prerogatives.

=== Rights and privileges ===
Each co-prince is granted an annual allowance by the General Council to dispose of as they see fit. Moreover, each co-prince appoints a personal representative in Andorra.

While the co-princes have no veto power over primary legislation duly passed by the General Council, they do retain a veto over certain treaties. For such treaties, the co-princes (or their designated representatives) participate in the negotiation process as well as give their final approval. The mechanisms regulating the co-princes' treaty powers are detailed in Articles 66 and 67 of the Constitution. Likewise, the co-princes enjoy the right to jointly propose constitutional amendments; this same right rests with the General Council.

=== Succession ===
In case of vacancy of either co-prince, the Constitution "recognizes the validity of the interim procedures foreseen by their respective statuses, in order for the normal function of Andorran institutions not to be interrupted". Thus, when a vacancy befalls the French presidency, the president of the French Senate acts as lay co-prince until a successor is duly chosen by the French electorate. To the contrary, when a vacancy occurs in the Diocese of Urgell, the coadjutor bishop for the diocese - if one is appointed by the Holy See - automatically succeeds to the prince-bishopric per the 1983 Code of Canon Law of the Latin Church. If a coadjutor bishop is not appointed, the auxiliary bishop then serving in the diocese acts as episcopal co-prince until a permanent successor is duly named by the Pope.

In the event either co-prince becomes incapacitated, the Constitution provides for the other prince to govern in their absence, subject as always to the countersignature of the head of Government or the syndic general. When the incapacitation expires, the usual transaction of public business by diarchal means resumes.

== See also ==
- List of heads of government of Andorra
- Prince-bishop

== Bibliography ==
- Armengol Aleix, E. (2009). Andorra: un profund i llarg viatge (in Catalan). Andorra: Government of Andorra. ISBN 9789992005491.
- Guillamet Anton, J. (2009). Andorra: nova aproximació a la història d'Andorra (in Catalan). Andorra: Revista Altaïr. ISBN 9788493622046.
