= Juan Alfonso Valerià y Aloza =

Spanish Roman Catholic prelate

The Most Reverend Juan Alfonso Valerià y Aloza
- Bishop of Lérida
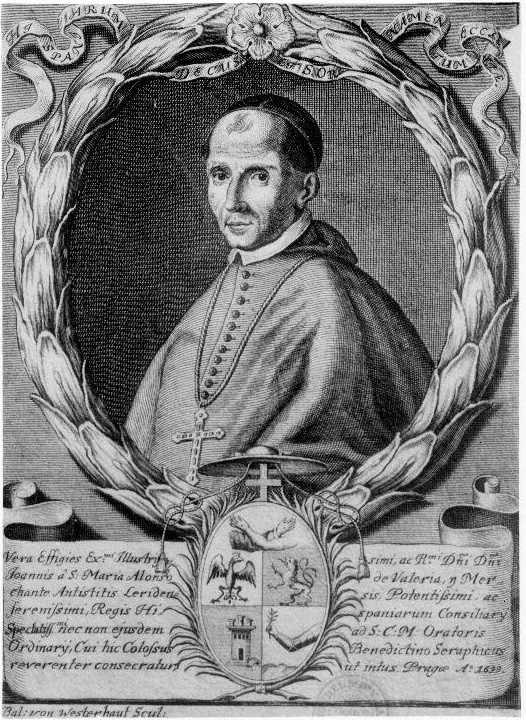
- Church: Catholic Church
- Diocese: Diocese of Lérida
- In office: 1699–1700
- Predecessor: Miguel Jerónimo de Molina
- Successor: Francisco Solís Hervás

Orders
- Consecration: 14 February 1694 by Gasparo Carpegna

Personal details
- Born: 1643 Terriente, Province of Teruel
- Died: 15 December 1700 (age 57) Lerida, Spain

Juan Alfonso Valerià y Aloza, O.F.M. or Joan de Santamaríi Alonso i Valeria (1643–1700) was a Roman Catholic prelate who served as Bishop of Lérida (1699–1700) and Bishop of Solsona (1694–1699).
He was also Spanish Ambassador in Vienna between 1696 and 1700.

== Biography ==
Juan Alfonso Valerià y Aloza was born in Terriente, Province of Teruel in 1643 and ordained a priest in the Order of Friars Minor. On 8 February 1694, he was appointed during the papacy of Pope Innocent XII as Bishop of Solsona. On 14 February 1694, he was consecrated bishop by Gasparo Carpegna, Cardinal-Priest of Santa Maria in Trastevere, with Giovanni Battista Visconti Aicardi, Bishop of Novara, and Fernando Manuel de Mejía, Bishop of Zamora, serving as co-consecrators.

On 1 June 1699, he was appointed during the papacy of Pope Innocent XII as Bishop of Lerida. He served as Bishop of Lerida until his death on 15 December 1700.

While bishop, he was the principal co-consecrator of José Llinás y Aznar, Archbishop of Tarragona (1695), and Jerónimo López, Bishop of Barbastro (1696).

=== Ambassador in Vienna ===
Between 1696 and 1700, Valerià y Aloza was Spanish Ambassador in Vienna, where he had his residence.

== External links and additional sources ==
- Cheney, David M. "Diocese of Solsona". Catholic-Hierarchy.org. (for Chronology of Bishops) ^{[self-published]}
- Chow, Gabriel. "Diocese of Solsona (Spain)". GCatholic.org. (for Chronology of Bishops) ^{[self-published]}
- Cheney, David M. "Diocese of Lleida". Catholic-Hierarchy.org. (for Chronology of Bishops) ^{[self-published]}
- Chow, Gabriel. "Diocese of Lleida (Spain)". GCatholic.org. (for Chronology of Bishops) ^{[self-published]}

Catholic Church titles
Preceded by Manuel de Alba	Bishop of Solsona; 1694–1699	Succeeded by Guillermo Goñalons
Preceded by Miguel Jerónimo de Molina y Aragonés	Bishop of Lérida; 1699–1700	Succeeded by Francisco Solís Hervás
