= Florentino Asensio Barroso =

Spanish Roman Catholic bishop

Blessed Florentino Asensio Barroso
- Titular Bishop of Euroea in Epiro
- Church: Roman Catholic Church
- Appointed: 11 November 1935
- Installed: 8 March 1936 (by proxy)
- Term ended: 9 August 1936
- Predecessor: Pedro Dionisio Tibiletti
- Successor: Alfredo del Tomba
- Other post: Apostolic Administrator of Barbastro (1935-1936)

Orders
- Ordination: 1 June 1901
- Consecration: 26 January 1936 by Remigio Gandásegui y Gorrochátegui
- Rank: Bishop

Personal details
- Born: Florentino Asensio Barroso; 16 October 1877 Villasexmir, Valladolid, Kingdom of Spain
- Died: 9 August 1936 (aged 58) Barbastro, Huesca, Second Spanish Republic
- Education: Pontifical University of Valladolid
- Motto: Ut omnes unum sint ("That all may be one")

Sainthood
- Feast day: 9 August
- Venerated in: Roman Catholic Church
- Title as Saint: Blessed
- Beatified: 4 May 1997; Saint Peter's Square, Vatican City by Pope John Paul II
- Attributes: Archbishop's attire; Crucifix
- Patronage: Persecuted Christians; Diocese of Barbastro

Florentino Asensio Barroso (16 October 1877 – 9 August 1936) was a Spanish Catholic prelate who served as the Apostolic Administrator of the Diocese of Barbastro. He served as a chaplain of both the Little Sisters of the Poor and the Servants of Jesus as a priest. He was made a bishop in 1935 and killed in 1936 during the Spanish Civil War.

His appointment as administrator was opposed, and he was soon captured and tortured. In mid-1936 he was shot to death.

He was beatified in 1997 after it was determined that he was killed in hatred of the faith.

== Life ==
Florentino Asensio Barroso was born on 16 October 1877 in Valladolid to poor parents. He made his First Communion on 1 May 1887. He made his first vows as an Augustinian in 1888 but was discouraged to continue in that order and directed instead to the diocesan seminary.

After a year of studies there he received the minor orders in 1889. He was ordained sub-deacon on 22 September 1900 and a deacon on 22 December 1900. He was ordained a priest on 1 June 1901 by the Auxiliary Bishop of Valladolid. He earned a doctorate in theology at the Pontifical University of Valladolid and then went on to teach there briefly.

He served as a pastor in Villaverde de Medina until 1902 when he became the personal assistant to José Cos y Macho, Archbishop of Valladolid. From 1902 until 1917 he was the confessor to the seminary in Valladolid. He also served as the confessor to various congregations and monasteries from 1920 until 1935. In 1925 he taught catechism to adults.

He was well regarded for his pastoral zeal in dealing with the sick and the poor. In 1935 the Apostolic Nuncio to Spain Federico Tedeschini recommended him to Pope Pius XI as à candidate for a bishop's appointment as the apostolic administrator of Diocese of Barbastro. On 11 November 1935, Pope Pius appointed him titular bishop of Euroea in Epiro and apostolic administrator of Barbastro. He received his episcopal consecration on 26 January 1936 from Remigio Gandásegui y Gorrochátegui, Archbishop of Valladolid, and he took possession of the see by proxy on 8 March 1936.

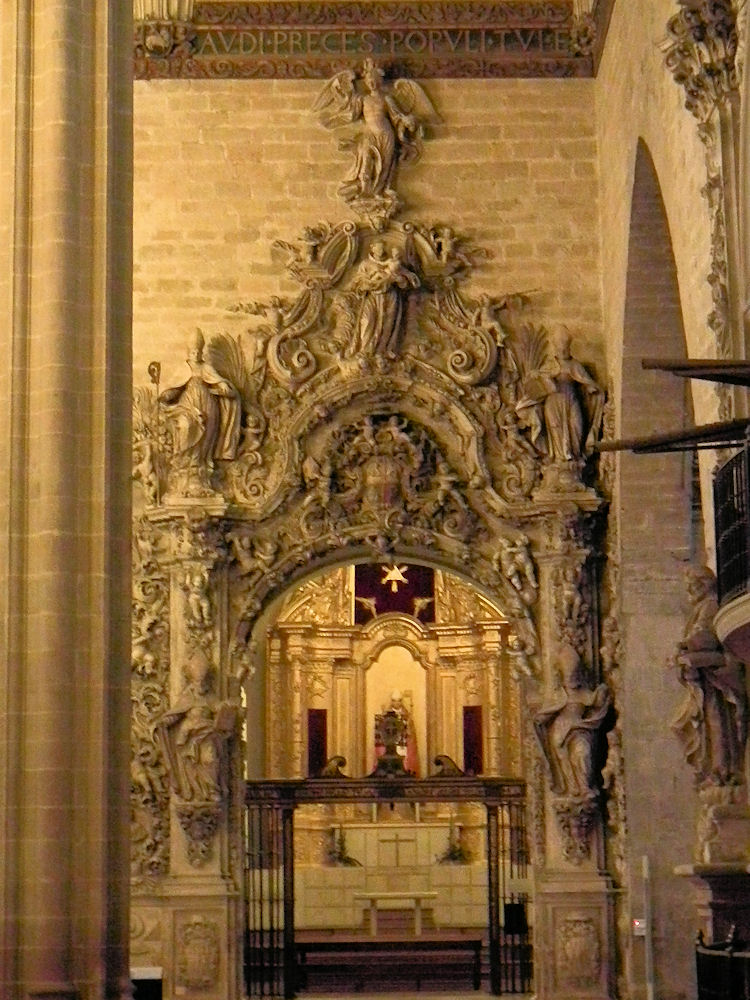
Relics

Barroso was arrested in the episcopal residence and was imprisoned on 22 July 1936 during the onslaught of the Spanish Civil War. On the night of 8 August he was taken to solitary confinement in Barbastro and was interrogated to the point of cutting off his genitals. On 9 August, he was shot to death three times in the temple. Along with other killed detainees, his body was taken to a cemetery in a truck and was thrown into a mass grave at around 2:00am. After the war concluded, his remains were easily identified based on the initials that marked his undergarments. He was given an autopsy on 16 April 1993.

== Beatification ==
The local beatification process commenced in Barbastro on 20 May 1947, with the accumulation of witness testimonies in addition to all documents that supported the fact that he was killed in hatred of the faith. This local process concluded on 30 April 1952. Barroso's cause was formally opened on 3 January 1953, granting him the title of Servant of God. It was ratified on 4 October 1991 in order for the cause to proceed.

The Positio was submitted to the Congregation for the Causes of Saints in Rome in 1993 and his martyrdom was approved on 31 January 1997. This allowed for Pope John Paul II to celebrate his beatification on 4 May 1997.
