= Francisco Solís Hervás =

Spanish Roman Catholic prelate

Most Reverend Francisco Solís Hervás
- Bishop of Córdob
- Church: Catholic Church
- Diocese: Diocese of Córdoba
- In office: 1714–1716
- Predecessor: Juan Bonilla Vargas
- Successor: Marcelino Siuri Navarro
- Previous post: Bishop of Lérida (1701–1713)

Orders
- Ordination: 1674
- Consecration: 21 December 1701 by Francesco Acquaviva d'Aragona

Personal details
- Born: 1657 Gibraltar
- Died: 14 October 1716 (age 59)

Francisco Solís Hervás, O. de M. (1657–1716) was a Roman Catholic prelate who served as Bishop of Córdoba (1714–1716) and Bishop of Lérida (1701–1713).

== Biography ==
Francisco Solís Hervás was born in Gibraltar in 1657 and ordained a priest in the Order of the Blessed Virgin Mary of Mercy in 1674. On 8 August 1701, he was appointed during the papacy of Pope Clement XI as Bishop of Lérida. On 21 December 1701, he was consecrated bishop by Francesco Acquaviva d'Aragona, Titular Archbishop of Larissa in Thessalia. On 22 June 1713, he was selected by the King of Spain as Bishop of Sigüenza but was not yet confirmed by the pope before being selected as Bishop of Córdoba and confirmed by Pope Clement XI on 17 January 1714. He served as Bishop of Córdoba until his death on 14 October 1716.

== Episcopal succession ==
While bishop, he was the principal consecrator of:

- Juan José Llamas Rivas, Bishop of Panamá (1714);

and the principal co-consecrator of:

- Carlos Borja Centellas y Ponce de León, Titular Archbishop of Trapezus (1705);
- Pedro Aguado, Bishop of Pamplona (1713); and
- Sancho Antonio Belunza Corcuera, Bishop of Ceuta (1714).

== External links and additional sources ==
- Cheney, David M. "Diocese of Lleida". Catholic-Hierarchy.org. (for Chronology of Bishops) ^{[self-published]}
- Chow, Gabriel. "Diocese of Lleida (Spain)". GCatholic.org. (for Chronology of Bishops) ^{[self-published]}
- Cheney, David M. "Diocese of Córdoba". Catholic-Hierarchy.org. (for Chronology of Bishops) ^{[self-published]}
- Chow, Gabriel. "Diocese of Córdoba". GCatholic.org. (for Chronology of Bishops) ^{[self-published]}

Catholic Church titles
Preceded by Juan Alfonso Valerià y Aloza	Bishop of Lérida; 1701–1713	Succeeded by Francisco Olaso Hipenza
Preceded by Juan Bonilla Vargas	Bishop of Córdoba; 1714–1716	Succeeded by Marcelino Siuri Navarro
