= Paintings from Santa Maria in Taüll =

Set of frescos

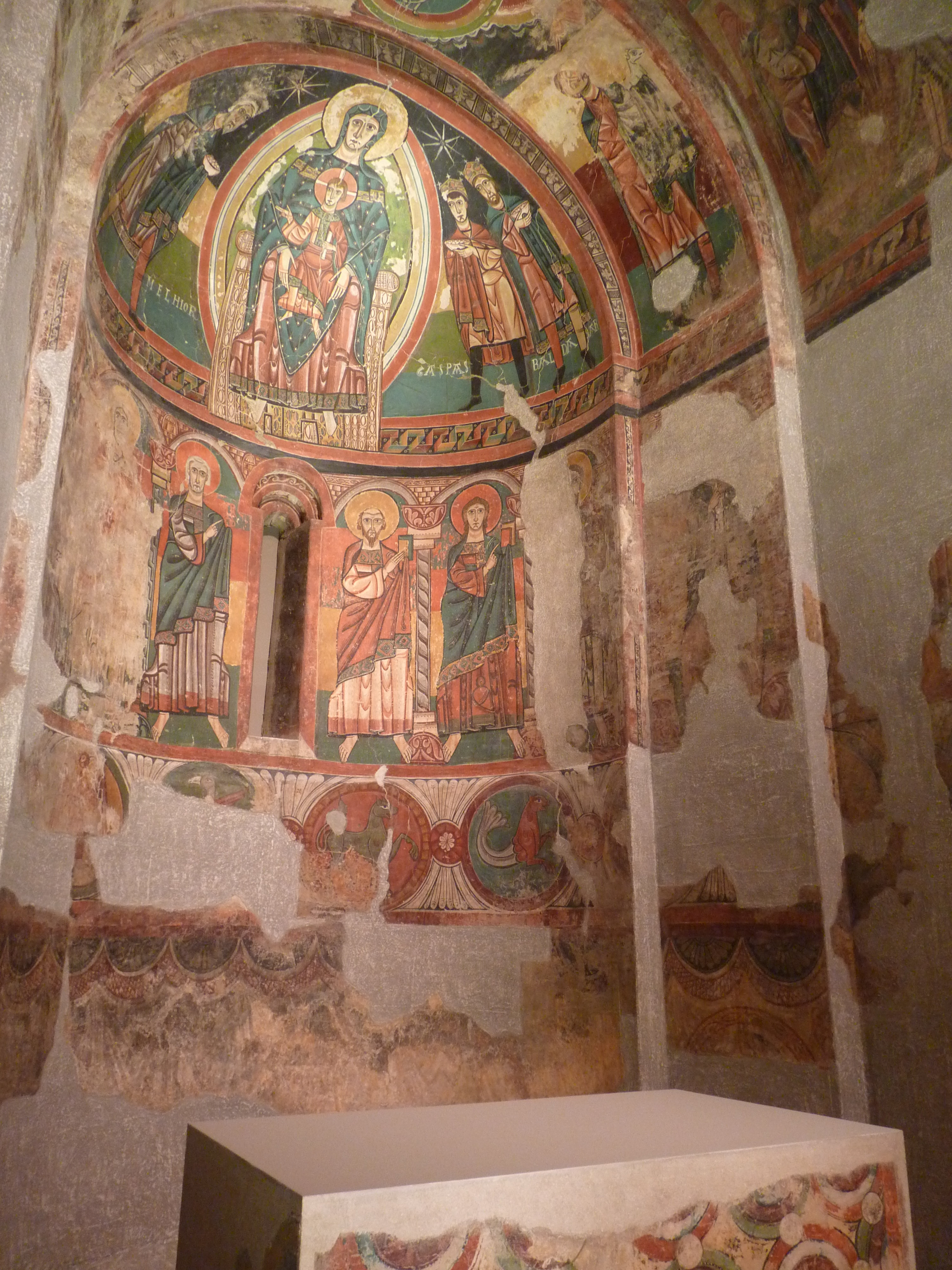
- Artist: Unknown
- Location: Museu Nacional d'Art de Catalunya; Barcelona

The Paintings from Santa Maria in Taüll are a set of frescos conserved at the Museu Nacional d'Art de Catalunya, in Barcelona.

The Maria de Taüll ensemble is one of the most complete series of Romanesque pictures kept in the Museum. Originally, the church interior was totally decorated and despite not being preserved intact what we have is enough for us to know with some certainty what themes were represented and how they were distributed inside the church and to distinguish the different artists.

In the most important part of the church, the apse, the Virgin Mary is portrayed as the Child’s throne in a scene from the Adoration of the Magi. It is the representation of the first acknowledgement of Christ’s divinity by all nations and of the different ages of man. Inside the semi-cylinder are representations of apostles as witnesses of this divine manifestation and on the arches preceding the apse is the Hand of God, the figure of Abel (an allegory of Christ’s sacrifice and the Eucharist), and the Agnus Dei.

In the previous section there are remains of what must have been a Maiestas Domini with the Tetramorph, of which anthropo-zoomorphic figures have survived that would have represented two Evangelists, a seraph and the archangel Gabriel. There are also representations of animals inscribed in circles beneath the figures of the Apostles, which generically resemble the subjects on Oriental textiles.

On the side walls of the church there were often scenes from the Bible or of saints, distributed in different registers. Here, next to the side apse, we find, for example, Herod with the Three Wise Men, who, in a synthesis of two different episodes, visit Herod and adore the Child. On the columns of the nave and the intradoses of the arches there are pictures of saints and prophets representative of the Church, amongst them St Clement and St Nicholas. On the west wall was the usual representation of the Day of Judgement and a version of the fight between David and Goliath (Psalms 17, 4-54), which represents the struggle of good against evil.

The consecration of the church by the Bishop of Roda and Barbastro on 11 December 1123 provides the key for dating the paintings at the east end. The artist, associated with Castilian sites like Santa Cruz de Maderuelo (Museo del Prado), is the best in this ensemble. His style shows a clear dependence on that of the central apse of Sant Climent in Taüll, especially in the modelling of the forms and the geometricisation of clothing.

The artist responsible for the rest of the paintings in the church is later, more rustic and has less technical resources. He has been called the Master of the Last Judgement and is connected with the paintings of the apsidiole of Sant Climent in Taüll.

== See also ==
- Altar frontal from Santa Maria in Taüll
