= Missionary Daughters of the Heart of Mary =

Roman Catholic religious order founded by Maria Güell

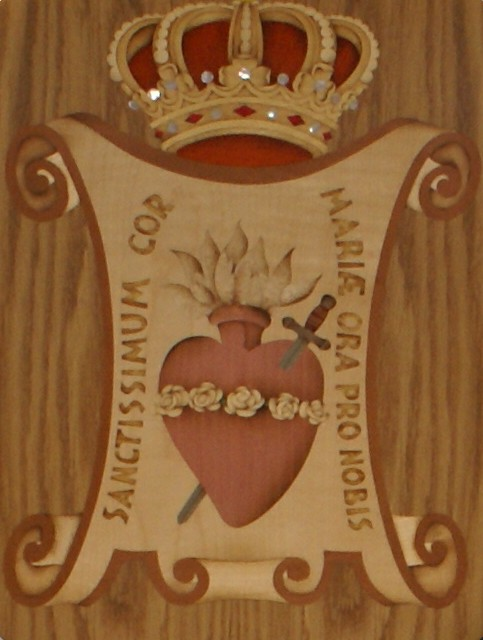
- Abbreviation: M.H.C.M.
- Formation: 14 September 1899; 126 years ago
- Type: Roman Catholic religious order
- Location: Cervera, Spain
- Superior General: Aurelia Rocco Veliz
- Key people: Maria Güell, foundress
- Website: Missionary Daughters of the Heart of Mary

The Missionary Daughters of the Heart of Mary (Catalan: Missioneres Filles del Cor de Maria) are the members of a Roman Catholic religious order founded by Maria Güell (1848-1921) in Spain in 1899. The Order’s mission is to help the sick and those in need, as well as to educate young people.

== History ==
The origins of the congregation date back to the community of Sisters of Charity who worked under the Rule of Saint Vincent de Paul at the hospital in Cervera: founded in 1805, it was incorporated in 1880 into the Congregation of the Sisters of the Holy Family of Anna Maria Janer Anglarill, formerly the superior of the Cervera community.

In 1884, the house in Cervera elected Maria Güell as superior; she had joined the Sisters of Charity in 1872, and under her leadership the union between the Cervera community and Janer’s congregation was dissolved. Mother Güell extended her sisters’ apostolate to include home care for the sick and worked to transform the community into a religious congregation: the Claretians of Cervera drew up new constitutions, which were approved by the bishop of Solsona on 14 September 1899.

The first branch was opened in 1907 in Balaguer. In 1908, Güell y Puig adopted for the institute the title ‘Sisters of Charity, Daughters of the Immaculate Heart of Mary’; the name ‘Missionary Daughters of the Heart of Mary’ was chosen at the special chapter of 1969.

Pope Paul VI approved it as a Congregation of Pontifical Right in 1966.

== Activity ==
The sisters devote themselves primarily to caring for the sick in hospitals, clinics and in people’s homes, but also to serving in seminaries and religious schools and to teaching.

As well as in Spain, they are present in Italy, Portugal, Brazil and Peru; the general house is in Cervera.

In 2017, the congregation had 183 sisters in 26 houses.
