= Joan Martí i Alanis =

His Excellency The Most Reverend Archbishop Joan Martí i Alanis

Co-Prince of Andorra
- Reign: 31 January 1971 – 12 May 2003
- Predecessor: Ramon Iglesias i Navarri; Ramón Malla Call (acting)
- Successor: Joan Enric Vives i Sicília
- Co-Prince: Georges Pompidou (until 1974); Valéry Giscard d'Estaing (1974 – 1981); François Mitterrand (1981 – 1995); Jacques Chirac (from 1995)
- Bishop of Urgell
- See: Urgell
- Appointed: 25 November 1970
- Installed: 31 January 1971
- Term ended: 12 May 2003
- Predecessor: Ramon Iglesias i Navarri
- Successor: Joan Enric Vives i Sicília

Orders
- Ordination: 17 June 1951
- Consecration: 31 January 1971 by Luigi Dadaglio
- Rank: Archbishop ad personam

Personal details
- Born: 29 November 1928 Milá, Alt Camp, Tarragona, Catalonia, Spain
- Died: 11 October 2009 (aged 80) Barcelona, Catalonia, Spain
- Denomination: Catholicism

Joan Martí i Alanis (29 November 1928 – 11 October 2009) was a Spanish Catholic prelate who served as Bishop of Urgell and ex officio episcopal co-Prince of Andorra from 1971 to 2003. He was a co-signatory, along with François Mitterrand, of Andorra's new constitution in 1993.

In 1979, he founded Caritas Andorra.

Catholic Church titles
Preceded by Ramon Malla Call as Apostolic Administrator	Bishop of Urgell; 1971–2003	Succeeded by Joan Enric Vives i Sicília
Regnal titles
Preceded by Ramon Malla Call as acting Co-Prince	Co-Prince of Andorra; 1971–2003 with Georges Pompidou (1971–1974); Valéry Giscard d'Estaing (1974–1981); François Mitterrand (1981–1995); Jacques Chirac (1995–2003)	Succeeded by Joan Enric Vives i Sicília
