= Pedro Serra =

Pedro Serra may refer to:

- Pedro Serra (footballer) (1899–1983), Spanish footballer
- Pedro Antón Serra (1585–1632), Roman Catholic prelate
- Pedro Antonio Joaquim Correa da Serra Garção (1724–1772), Portuguese poet

== See also ==
- Pere Serra (fl. 1357–1406), Catalan painter
