= Raymond of Barbastro =

French Roman Catholic saint

Saint Raymond
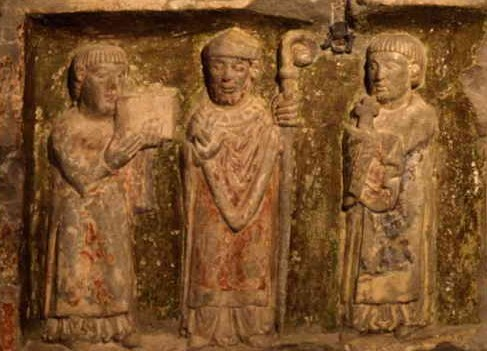
- Relief on the tomb of St. Raymond

Bishop of Barbastro
- Born: Durban, France
- Died: 1126; Barbastro, Aragon, Spain
- Venerated in: Roman Catholic Church
- Feast: 21 June
- Patronage: City of Barbastro and Roman Catholic Diocese of Barbastro-Monzón

Raymond William (Raimundo Guillermo) born in Durban, France. He entered the Canons Regular and in 1104 was appointed Bishop of Barbastro in Spain, remaining in that position until his death of natural causes in 1126. On 10 December 1123, he consecrated the church of Sant Climent de Taull and a day later that of Santa Maria de Taüll. He was canonised by Innocent II in 1136.
