= Maria Güell =

Spanish religious sister and Venerable (1848–1921)

Venerable Maria Güell
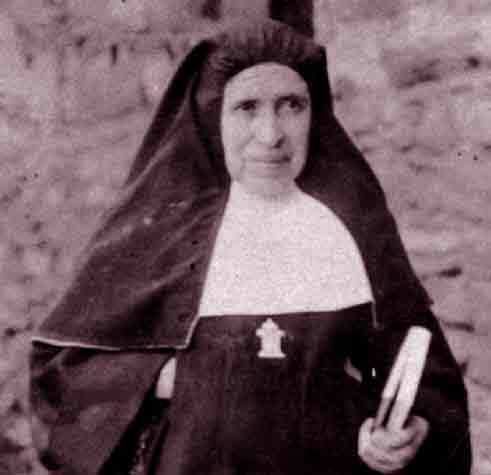
- Maria Güell circa 1920
- Born: 24 June 1848; Valls, Catalonia, Spain
- Died: 14 June 1921 (aged 72); Cervera, Catalonia, Spain

Maria Güell, born as Maria Teresa Úrsula Güell i Puig, (24 June 1848 – 14 June 1921) was a Spanish religious sister, who founded the Missionary Daughters of the Heart of Mary, a congregation dedicated to caring for the sick and education, in 1899. She has been declared venerable by the Roman Catholic Church.

== Biography ==
Maria Güell was born on 24 June 1848 in Valls, Catalonia, Spain in a pious Catholic family. She studied at the school run by the Daughters of Charity of Saint Vincent de Paul in Valls, whilst also providing care for the sick. From a young age, she had a deep Christian devotion and at the age of 23 or 24, in 1872, Güell joined the community of the Sisters of Charity in Cervera, where she completed her novitiate and took her vows. She became its superior general in 1884.

On 14 September 1899, she founded the congregation of the Missionary Daughters of the Heart of Mary at the Hospital of Cervera, following the approval of the constitutions by the bishop of Solsona. The congregation was established with the aim of caring for the sick and providing education, and soon opened new foundations; Pope Paul VI approved it as a Congregation of Pontifical Right in 1966, and it is now present in several countries around the world.

She died on 14 June 1921 in Cervera after a short illness. Before her death, her lasts words were recorded:

At this moment I clearly understand the value of the virtues practised for the love of God, the value of prayer, and especially how much it has helped to have spent my life in humility and self-denial and in the practice of charity towards the Sisters of the community and towards the poor and the sick. I am happy to have consecrated my life to God and to charity.

— Maria Güell,

Pope John Paul II declared her venerable in 1998. Her hometown awarded her the title of honorary citizen in 2001 and unveiled her portrait in the Gallery of Honorary Citizens.
