= Ebontius =

French Roman Catholic saint

Bishop of Barbastro
- Born: Comminges, Haute Garonne, France
- Died: 1104; Barbastro, Kingdom of Aragon

Ebontius (died 1104), also known as Ebon, Pontius, or Ponce, was Bishop of Barbastro, Spain, after its recapture from the Moors. Born in Comminges, Haute Garonne, France, he became a Benedictine and abbot before accepting the See of Babastro.
