= Barbastro Cathedral =

Catholic Cathedral in Barbastro, Spain

- Cathedral of Saint Mary of the Assumption
- Catedral de Santa Maria de la Asunción
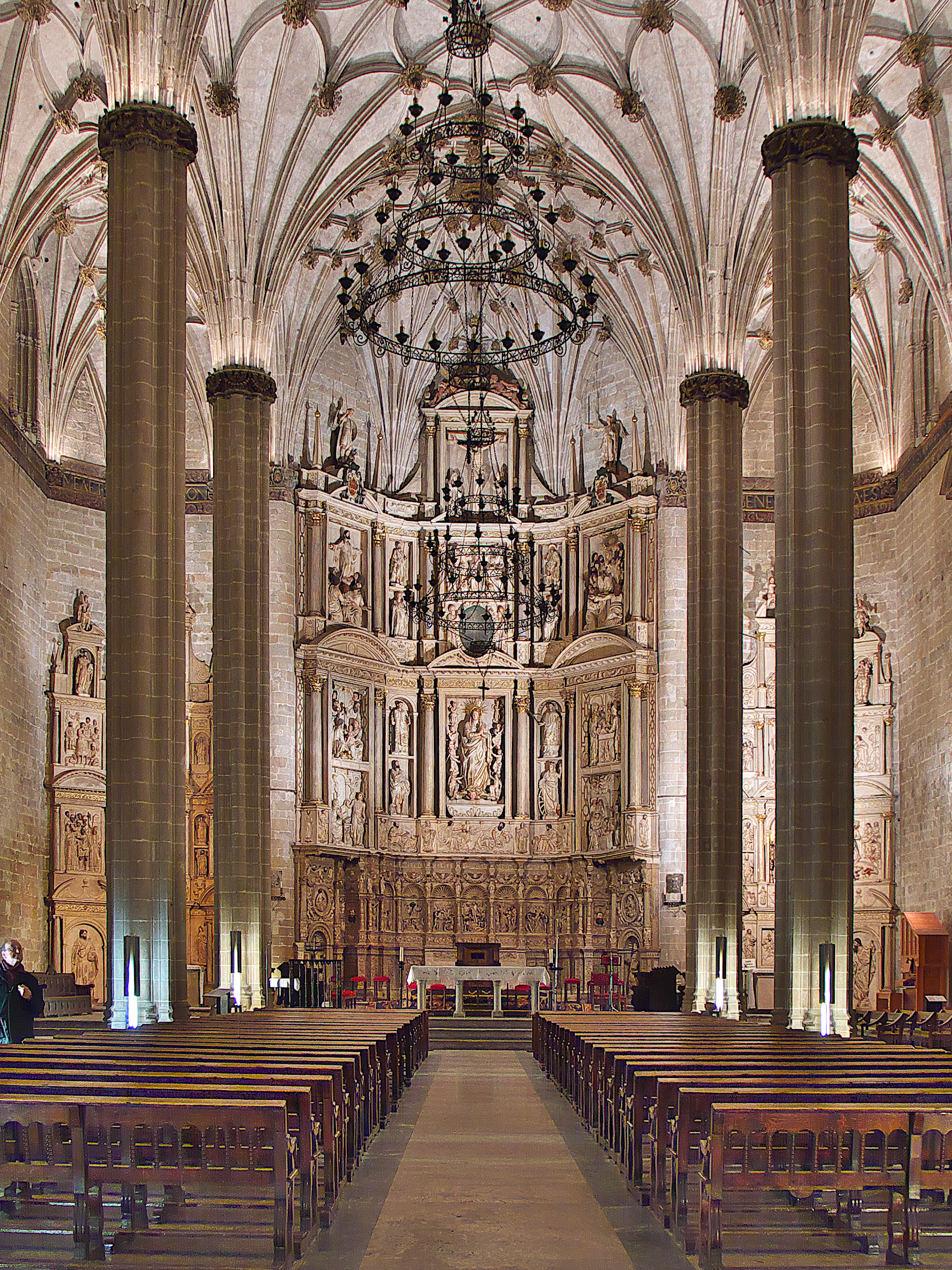
- Central nave.
- Barbastro Cathedral
- 42.0360°N 0.1224°E
- Location: Barbastro
- Address: 1, Palacio Street
- Country: Spain
- Denomination: Catholic
- Website: museodiocesano.es/catedral-barbastro

History
- Status: Cathedral
- Dedication: Assumption of Mary
- Dedicated: 1571

Architecture
- Architect(s): Juan de Sariñena, Juan de Segura
- Style: Gothic
- Years built: 1517—1533

Administration
- Metropolis: Zaragoza
- Diocese: Barbastro-Monzón

Clergy
- Bishop: Ángel Pérez Pueyo

Spanish Cultural Heritage
- Type: Non-movable
- Criteria: Monument
- Designated: 3 June 1931
- Reference no.: RI-51-0000628

The Cathedral of Barbastro (Spanish: Catedral de Santa María de la Asunción) is a Roman Catholic cathedral in the town of Barbastro in the province of Huesca, Aragon, Spain.

== History ==
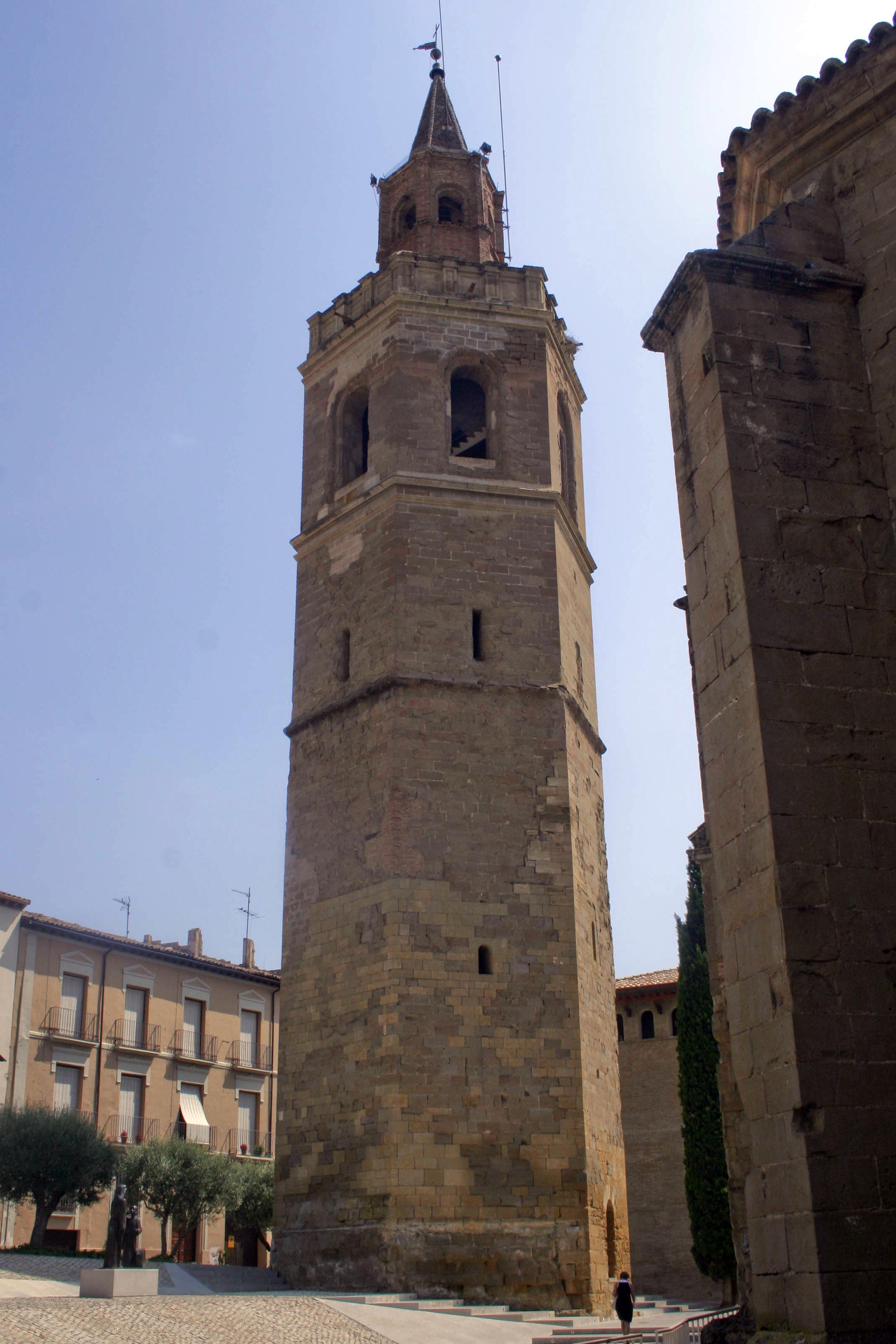
The Bell tower was built separately from the cathedral.

A church was first erected on May 5, 1101, at the site of a mosque by Saint Poncio, bishop of the diocese. A new church was rebuilt in the 16th century.

The present church was erected between 1517 and 1533 by Juan de Sariñena, Juan de Segura and others. The church was declared a national monument in 1931. Of interest are the thin columns ending in floral and decorated capitals. The central and main altarpiece has scenes dedicated to the Assumption of the Virgin and Passion of Christ with an alabaster base sculpted in a Plateresque in the style of Damián Forment. The upper part was carved in wood between 1600 and 1602. The chapel of San Jose has an altarpiece dedicated to the Abbot St Victorián, and is attributed to Bartolomé Bermejo or his studio.

One of the southern chapels, the Chapel of Miracles, has a venerated wood icon entitled the Santo Cristo de los Milagros, (Christ of the Miracles), carved by Enrique Monjó in 1939 at the end of the Spanish Civil War. One relief also commemorates the martyred bishop, Blessed Florentino Asensio.

Barbastro Cathedral together with the co-cathedral at Monzón, belongs to the Diocese of Barbastro-Monzón.
