= Ramón Malla Call =

Bishop of Lleida

- Bishop of Lleida
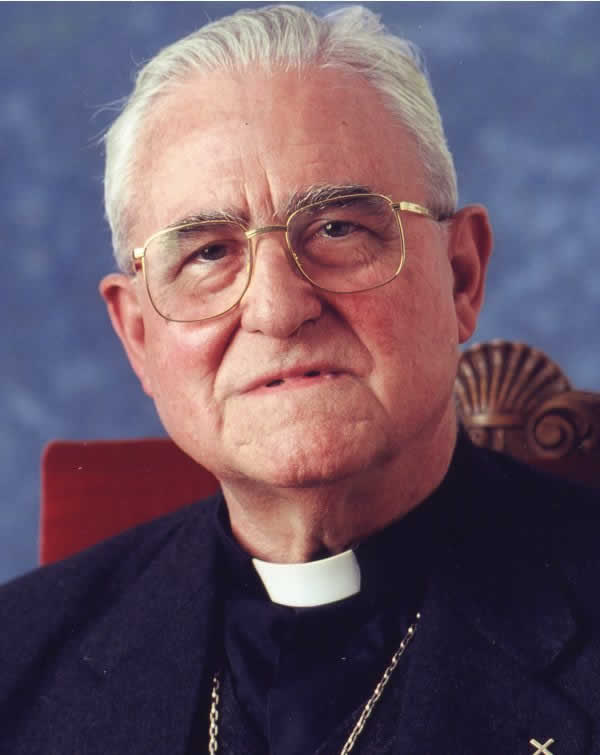
- Native name: Ramon Malla i Call
- Church: Catholic Church
- Diocese: Diocese of Lleida
- In office: 24 July 1968 – 29 October 1999
- Predecessor: Aurelio del Pino Gómez
- Successor: Francesc-Xavier Ciuraneta Aymí

Orders
- Ordination: 19 December 1948
- Consecration: 27 October 1968 by Luigi Dadaglio

Personal details
- Born: 4 September 1922 La Seu d'Urgell, Province of Lleida, Kingdom of Spain
- Died: 18 April 2014 (aged 91)

Ramón Malla i Call (4 September 1922 – 18 April 2014) was Bishop of Lleida. From 1969 until 1971 he was Apostolic Administrator of the Diocese of Urgell during a sede vacante and therefore acting Episcopal Co-Prince of Andorra. He was born in La Seu d'Urgell, Catalonia. He was ordained as priest on 16 December 1948, in Salamanca. On 24 July 1968 he was consecrated bishop of Lleida. On 19 December 1999 he became Emeritus Bishop.

Catholic Church titles
Preceded by Aurelio del Pino Gómez	Bishop of Lleida; 1968–1999	Succeeded by Francesc Xavier Ciuraneta Aymí
Preceded by Ramón Iglesias i Navarri as Bishop of Urgell	Apostolic Administrator of the Diocese of Urgell; 1969–1971	Succeeded by Joan Martí Alanis as Bishop of Urgell
Regnal titles
Preceded by Ramón Iglesias i Navarri as Co-Prince of Andorra	Acting Co-Prince of Andorra; 1969–1971 with Georges Pompidou (1969–1971)	Succeeded by Joan Martí Alanis as Co-Prince of Andorra
