= Miguel Jerónimo de Molina =

Spanish prelate

His Excellency Miguel Jerónimo de Molina O.S.Io.Hieros.
- Bishop of Lleida
- Church: Roman Catholic
- Diocese: Lleida (1682-1698); Malta (1678-1682)
- Appointed: 25 May 1682
- In office: 1682-1698
- Predecessor: Francesc Berardo
- Successor: Juan Alfonso Valerià y Aloza
- Previous post: Bishop of Malta (1678-1682)

Orders
- Ordination: 5 March 1662
- Consecration: 24 April 1678 by Carlo Pio di Savoia
- Rank: Bishop

Personal details
- Born: 7 October 1638 Montsià, Catalonia, Spain
- Died: 31 August 1698 (aged 59)

Miguel Jerónimo de Molina y Aragonés (7 October 1638 – 31 August 1698) was a Spanish prelate who was Bishop of Malta from 1678 to 1682 when he was transferred to the Diocese of Lleida in Catalonia, Spain.

== Early years ==
Molina was born in Fortanete, Aragón, on 7 October 1638. On 5 March 1662, he was ordained priest of the Knights Hospitallers.

== Bishop of Malta ==
Pope Innocent XI appointed him as Bishop of Malta on 18 April 1678 and he was consecrated seven days later on 24 April by Cardinal Carlo Pio di Savoia. As Bishop of Malta, he gave a detailed review of the status of the diocese during a visit to Pope Innocent XI. Bishop Molina also called for a synod to reform the diocese. He created two new parishes in Gozo, Xewkija and Għarb.

== Bishop of Lleida ==
On 25 May 1682, Molina was appointed Bishop of Lleida in the Principality of Catalonia, Spain. He died on 31 August 1698 at the age of 59.
