= Arturo Tabera Araoz =

Spanish cardinal

His Eminence Arturo Tabera Araoz CMF
- Prefect of the Congregation for the Religious and Secular Institutes
- Church: Roman Catholic Church
- Appointed: 13 September 1973
- Term ended: 13 June 1975
- Predecessor: Ildebrando Antoniutti
- Successor: Eduardo Francisco Pironio
- Other post: Cardinal-Priest of San Pietro in Montorio (1969-75)
- Previous posts: Titular Bishop of Lyrbe (1946-50); Apostolic Administrator of Barbastro (1946-50); Bishop of Barbastro (1950); Bishop of Albacete (1950-68); Archbishop of Pamplona (1968-71); Apostolic Administrator of Tudela (1968-71); Prefect of the Congregation for Divine Worship (1971-73)

Orders
- Ordination: 22 December 1928 by Basilio Pompili
- Consecration: 5 May 1946 by Leopoldo Eijo y Garay
- Created cardinal: 28 April 1969 by Pope Paul VI
- Rank: Cardinal-Priest

Personal details
- Born: Arturo Tabera Araoz; 29 October 1903 Barco de Ávila, Kingdom of Spain
- Died: 13 June 1975 (aged 71) Clinic Pio XI, Rome, Italy
- Buried: Sacro Cuore di Maria
- Parents: Obdulio Tabera; Emilia Araoz
- Education: Pontifical Roman Athenaeum S. Apollinare
- Motto: Donec formetur Christus in vobis

Styles of Arturo Tabera Araoz
- Reference style: His Eminence
- Spoken style: Your Eminence
- Informal style: Cardinal
- See: Lirbe (titular see)

Arturo Tabera Araoz CMF (29 October 1903 – 13 June 1975) was a Spanish cardinal of the Catholic Church who served as Prefect of the Sacred Congregation for Religious and Secular Institutes.

== Early years ==
Arturo Tabera Araoz was born in Barco, near Ávila, Spain. His uncle was a priest and he joined the Congregation of Sons of the Immaculate Heart of Mary in May 1915. He was educated at the Claretian Seminary, and the Pontifical Roman Athenaeum "S. Apollinare" in Rome where he earned a doctorate in canon law.

== Priesthood ==
He was ordained on 22 December 1928. He was from 1930 until 1946 a faculty member of the Theological School of Zafra, Badajoz; director of the journal Ilustración del Clero, Madrid; staff member of the journal Commemoratium pro religiosis, Rome; secretary of the prefecture of studies of his congregation; founder of the journal Vida religiosa, Rome; vice-postulator of the cause of beatification of Marcelo Spinola y Maestre, Archbishop of Seville.

== Episcopate ==
Pope Pius XII appointed him titular bishop of Lirbe and apostolic administrator of Barbastro, Spain, on 16 February 1946. He was transferred to the diocese of Albacete on 13 May 1950. He attended the Second Vatican Council in Rome. He was promoted to the metropolitan see of Pamplona by Pope Paul VI on 23 July 1968.

== Cardinalate ==
He was made Cardinal-Priest of San Pietro in Montorio in the consistory of 28 April 1969 by Pope Paul. He was appointed Prefect of the Congregation for Divine Worship on 20 February 1971. Pope Paul appointed him prefect of the Sacred Congregation for Religious and Secular Institutes on 8 September 1973.

He died in 1975 in Rome and was buried in the Basilica of Sacred Heart of Mary, Piazza Euclide, Rome.

Catholic Church titles
Preceded by Ildebrando Antoniutti	Prefect of the Sacred Congregation for Religious and Secular Institutes; 1973–1975	Succeeded by Eduardo Francisco Pironio
Preceded by Benno Gut	Prefect of the Congregation for Divine Worship; 1971–1973	Succeeded by James Knox
