= Justí Guitart i Vilardebó =

Co-Prince of Andorra

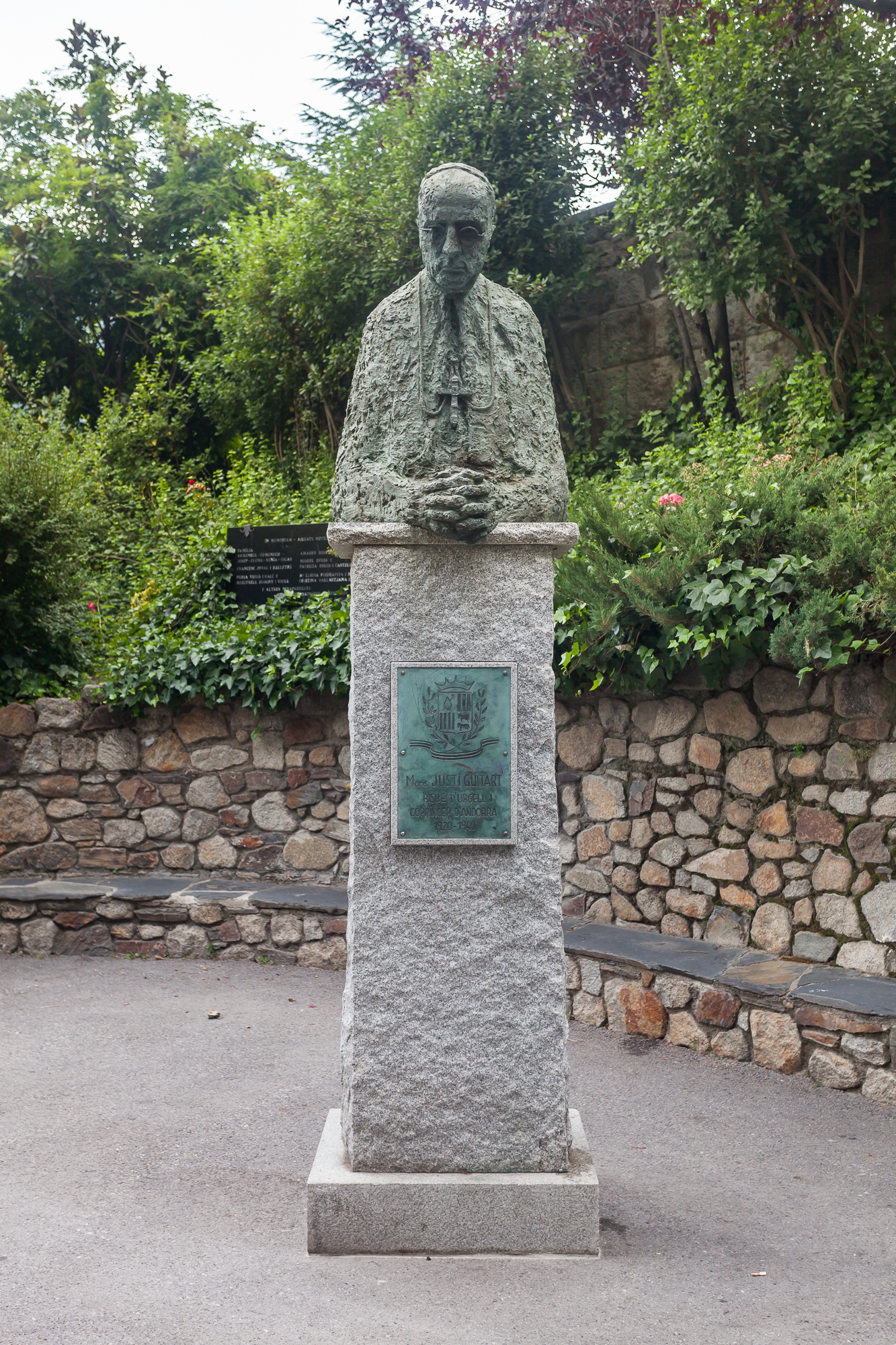
Justí Guitart

Justí Guitart i Vilardebó (December 16, 1875 – January 30, 1940) was the Bishop of Urgell and Episcopal Co-Prince of Andorra from 1920 until his death in 1940.

Born in Barcelona, Guitart was ordained as a priest in 1901, and was consecrated as Bishop of Urgell on May 23, 1920. He took the oath as Prince on July 27 of the same year. During his reign, numerous improvements, such as the introduction of electricity, the construction of roads, and establishment of Spanish post offices, came to Andorra.

Guitart died in Barcelona on 30 January 1940.

There is a street named after him in La Seu d'Urgell called the Carrer del Bisbe Guitart. On September 9, 2009 a monument dedicated to his memory was established in Andorra.

Regnal titles
Catholic Church titles
Preceded by Joan Benlloch Vivó	Co-prince of Andorra and Bishop of Urgell; 1920–1940	Succeeded by Ramón Iglesias i Navarri
