= Salvador Giménez Valls =

Spanish prelate

The Most Reverend Salvador Giménez Valls
- Bishop of Lleida
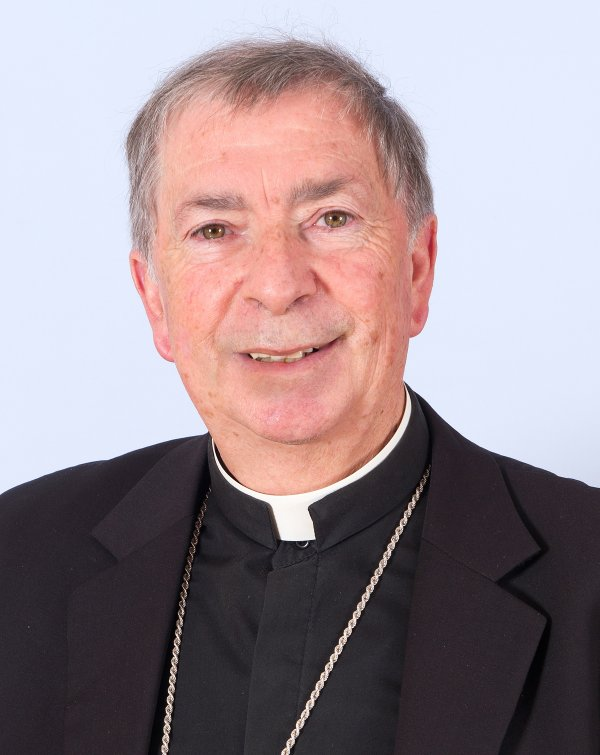
- The bishop pictured in 2016.
- Church: Roman Catholic Church
- Diocese: Lleida
- See: Lleida
- Appointed: 28 July 2015
- Installed: 20 September 2015
- Term ended: 21 May 2025
- Predecessor: Juan Piris Frígola
- Previous posts: Titular Bishop of Abula (2005-09); Auxiliary Bishop of Valencia (2005-09); Apostolic Administrator of Menorca (2008-09); Bishop of Menorca (2009-15)

Orders
- Ordination: 9 June 1973 by José María García Lahiguera
- Consecration: 2 July 2005 by Agustín García-Gasco Vicente

Personal details
- Born: Salvador Giménez Valls; 31 May 1948 (age 78) Muro d'Alcoi, Spain
- Education: Pontifical University of Salamanca; University of Valencia
- Motto: Mane nobiscum Domine
- Coat of arms

Salvador Giménez Valls (born 31 May 1948, Muro d'Alcoi) is a Spanish prelate and the current Roman Catholic Bishop of Lleida. He is a former Bishop of Menorca. In 1960, he studied ecclesiastical studies at the Metropolitan Seminary of Valencia.

A philosopher and historian, he studied at the Pontifical University of Salamanca and was ordained as a priest on 9 June 1973. He was appointed the Auxiliary Bishop of Valencia, Spain and the Titular Bishop of Abula on 11 May 2005; on 2 July 2005, he was fully appointed the Bishop of Titular. On 21 May 2009, the announcement of his appointment as the Bishop of Menorca, Spain was made.

In July 2022, he was elected as the new Bishop President of the Interdiocesan Secretariat for the Custody and Promotion of Sacred Art (SICPAS) in Barcelona.

Pope Leo XIV accepted his resignation on 21 May 2025, and appointed Daniel Palau Valero to succeed him.
