= Diocese of Menorca =

Roman Catholic diocese in Spain

Coordinates: 39°57′N 4°3′E

Diocese of Menorca Dioecesis Minoricensis Diócesis de Menorca (es) Diòcesi de Menorca (ca)

Catholic
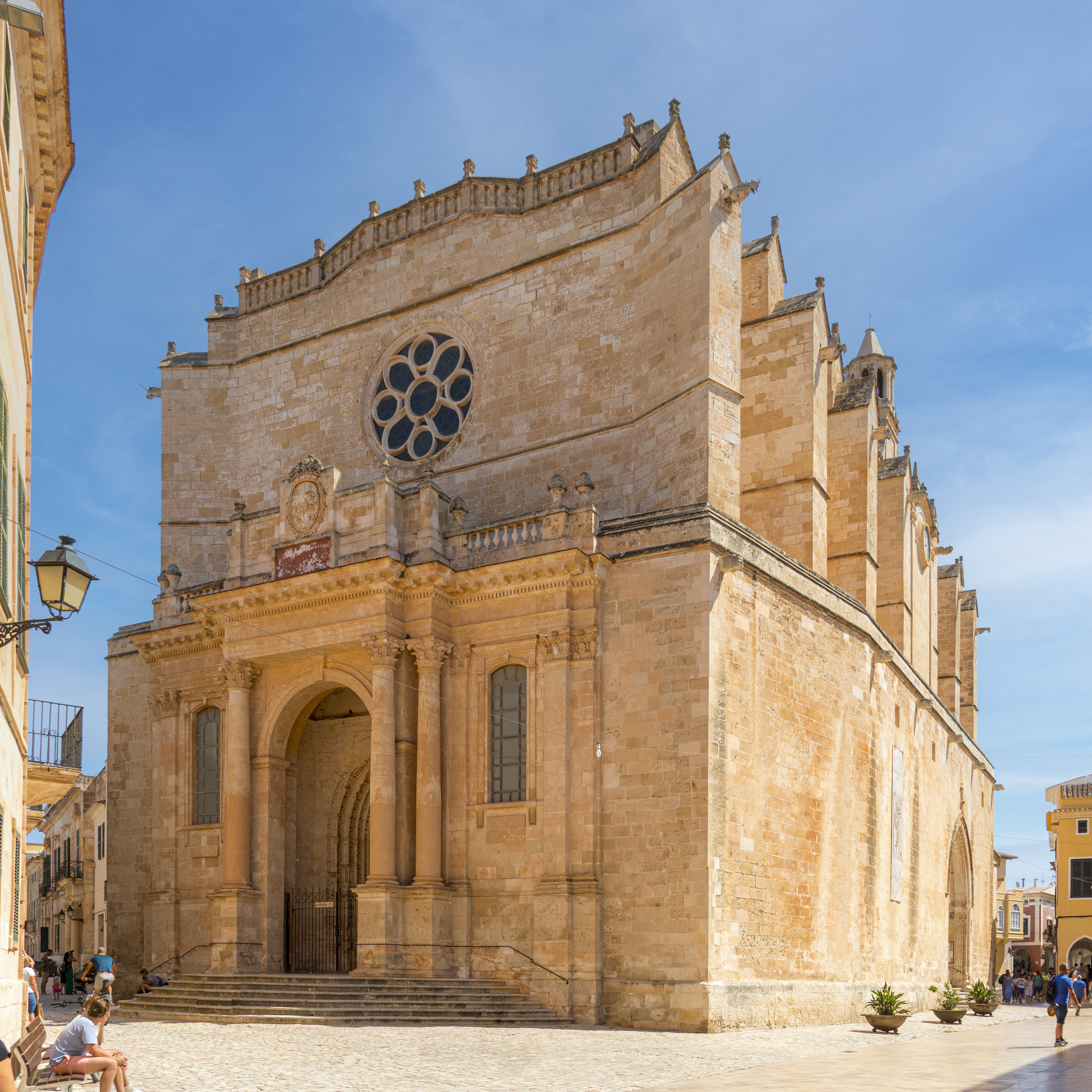
- Minorca Cathedral

Location
- Country: Spain
- Ecclesiastical province: Valencia
- Metropolitan: Valencia

Statistics
- Area: 701 km^{2} (271 sq mi)
- Population: Total; Catholics: (as of 2004); 81,288; 76,000 (93.5%)

Information
- Denomination: Roman Catholic
- Rite: Latin Rite
- Established: 1795
- Cathedral: Cathedral Basilica of St Mary in Ciudadela Menorca

Current leadership
- Pope: Leo XIV
- Bishop: Gerardo Villalonga Hellín
- Metropolitan Archbishop: Antonio Cañizares Llovera

Map
- The Diocese of Menorca in blue.

Website
- Website of the Diocese

The Diocese of Menorca (Latin: Dioecesis Minoricensis) is a Latin Church diocese of the Catholic Church located in the island of Menorca in the ecclesiastical province of Valencia in Spain.

== History ==
It was established as the Diocese of Menorca in 1795.

In 2021, a priest in the diocese was stripped of pastoral duties and rights after he was found likely to have committed financial fraud.

== Leadership ==
- Antonio Vila Campos (18 Dec 1797 – 20 Dec 1802)
- Pedro Antonio Juano (20 Dec 1802 – 4 Jan 1814)
- Santiago Creus Martí (11 Jul 1815 – 29 May 1820)
  - Sede vacante (1820-1824)
- Antonio Ceruelo Sanz (30 May 1824 – 15 Jan 1831)
- Juan Antonio Díez Merino, O.P. (26 Mar 1831 – 16 Apr 1844)
  - Sede vacante (1844-1852)
- Tomás Roda Rodríguez (27 Sep 1852 – 20 Dec 1857)
- Mateo Jaume Garau (21 Dec 1857 – 17 Sep 1875)
- Manuel Mercader y Arroyo (17 Sep 1875 – 21 Feb 1890)
- Juan Comes y Vidal (26 Jun 1890 – 25 Jun 1896)
- Salvador Castellote y Pinazo (25 Jun 1896 – 26 Dec 1901)
- Juan Torres Ribas (9 Jun 1902 – 20 Jan 1939)
- Bartolomé Pascual Marroig (4 Mar 1939 – 18 Mar 1967)
- Miguel Moncadas Noguera (11 Dec 1968 – 1 Apr 1977)
- Antonio Deig Clotet (20 Sep 1977 – 7 Mar 1990)
- Francesc-Xavier Ciuraneta Aymí (12 Jun 1991 – 29 Oct 1999)
- Juan Piris Frígola (1 Mar 2001 – 16 Jul 2008)
- Salvador Giménez Valls (21 May 2009 – 28 Jul 2015)
- Francisco Conesa Ferrer (27 Oct 2016 – 3 Jan 2022)
- Gerardo Villalonga Hellín (14 Feb 2023 – present)

== See also ==
- Roman Catholicism in Spain
