= Francesc-Xavier Ciuraneta Aymí =

Spanish bishop (1940–2020)

The Most Reverend Francesc-Xavier Ciuraneta Aymí
- Bishop of Lleida
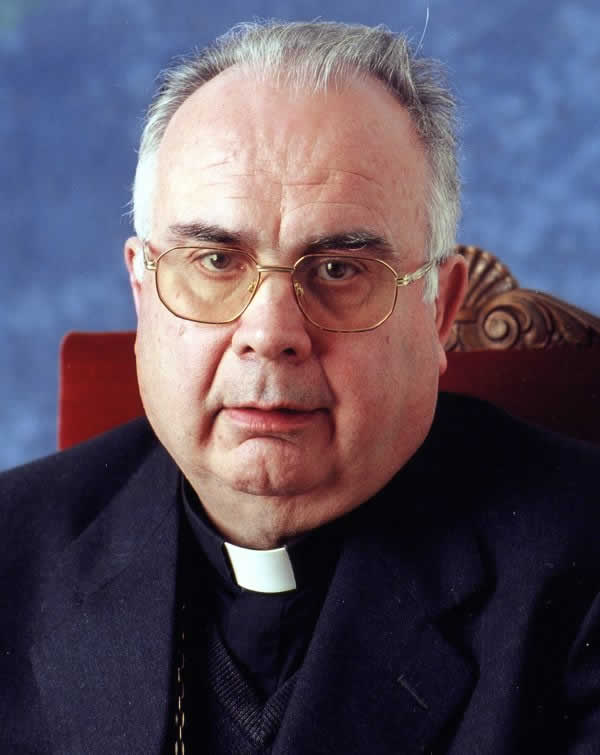
- Church: Catholic Church
- Installed: 1999
- Term ended: 2007
- Predecessor: Ramon Malla Call
- Successor: Juan Piris Frígola
- Previous post(s): Bishop of Menorca (1991–1999)

Orders
- Ordination: 28 June 1964
- Consecration: 14 September Sep 1991 by Mario Tagliaferri

Personal details
- Born: 12 March 1940; La Palma de Ebro, Spain
- Died: 11 November 2020 (aged 80); La Palma de Ebro, Spain
- Coat of arms

Francesc-Xavier Ciuraneta-Aymí (12 March 1940 – 11 November 2020) was a Spanish Catholic bishop.

Cuiraneta-Aymí was born in Spain and was ordained to the priesthood in 1964. He served as bishop of the Diocese of Menorca, Spain, from 1991 to 1999 and as bishop of the Diocese of Lleida, Spain, from 1999 to 2007.
