= Altar frontal from Santa Maria in Taüll =

Anonymous painting c.1200

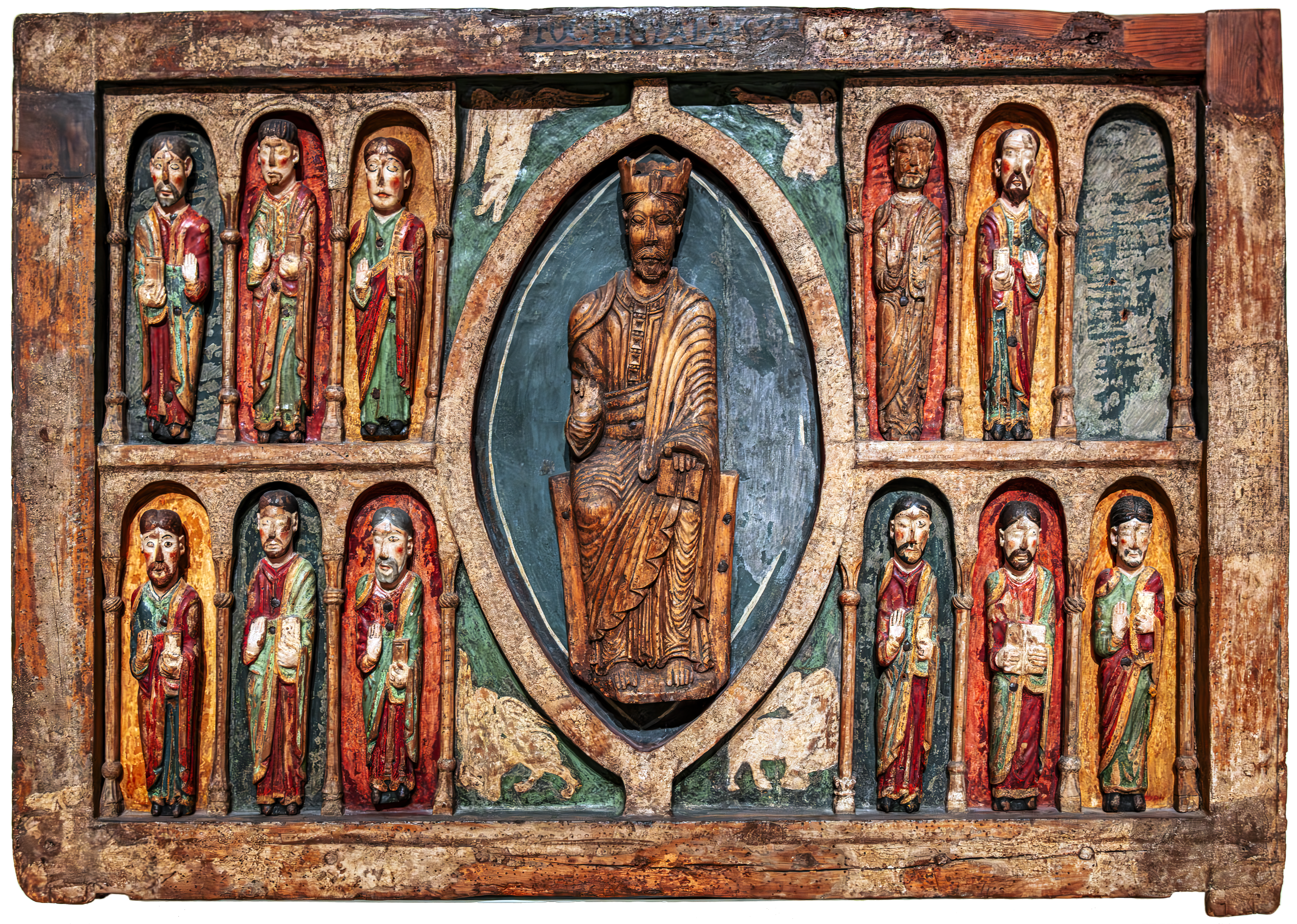
- Artist: Anonymous
- Year: c.1200
- Type: Tempera on wood and applied carvings
- Dimensions: 97 cm × 1035.5 cm (38 in × 407.7 in)
- Location: Museu Nacional d'Art de Catalunya, Barcelona

The Altar frontal from Santa Maria in Taüll is an altar frontal exhibited at the National Art Museum of Catalonia in Barcelona.

== Description ==
Most of the altar frontals known to us from the Romanesque period in Catalonia consist of a panel, painted in tempera, which in some cases is complemented with stucco relief elements. But alongside this more widespread form there were other technical possibilities, such as fresco painting or carved stone or marble or, as in this case, carved polychrome wood. Remember that some decoration and details, using gilded effects, resembled or imitated more luxurious items covered with precious metals.

The Altar frontal from Santa Maria in Taüll is part of a series of works discovered at the beginning of the twentieth century in the churches of the valley of Boí and is one of the items of highest quality from the Ribagorza workshops. These works are characterised by the cleanness of their forms, a certain vigour and a schematism that has led them to be compared to monumental sculptural groups of the second half of the twelfth century.

The composition and iconography are very common in this sort of item. In the central register is Christ in Majesty, inscribed in the mandorla, surrounded by the symbols of the Evangelists, whose marks remain. On either side are arranged the figures of the Apostles on two levels under the arches. The figures are carved in pine wood and preserve important traces of polychromy.

== See also ==
- Paintings from Santa Maria in Taüll
