= Ciutadella de Menorca Cathedral =

Roman Catholic church in Spain

Menorca Cathedral
- Cathedral-Basilica of Saint Mary
- Basílica Catedral de Santa Maria
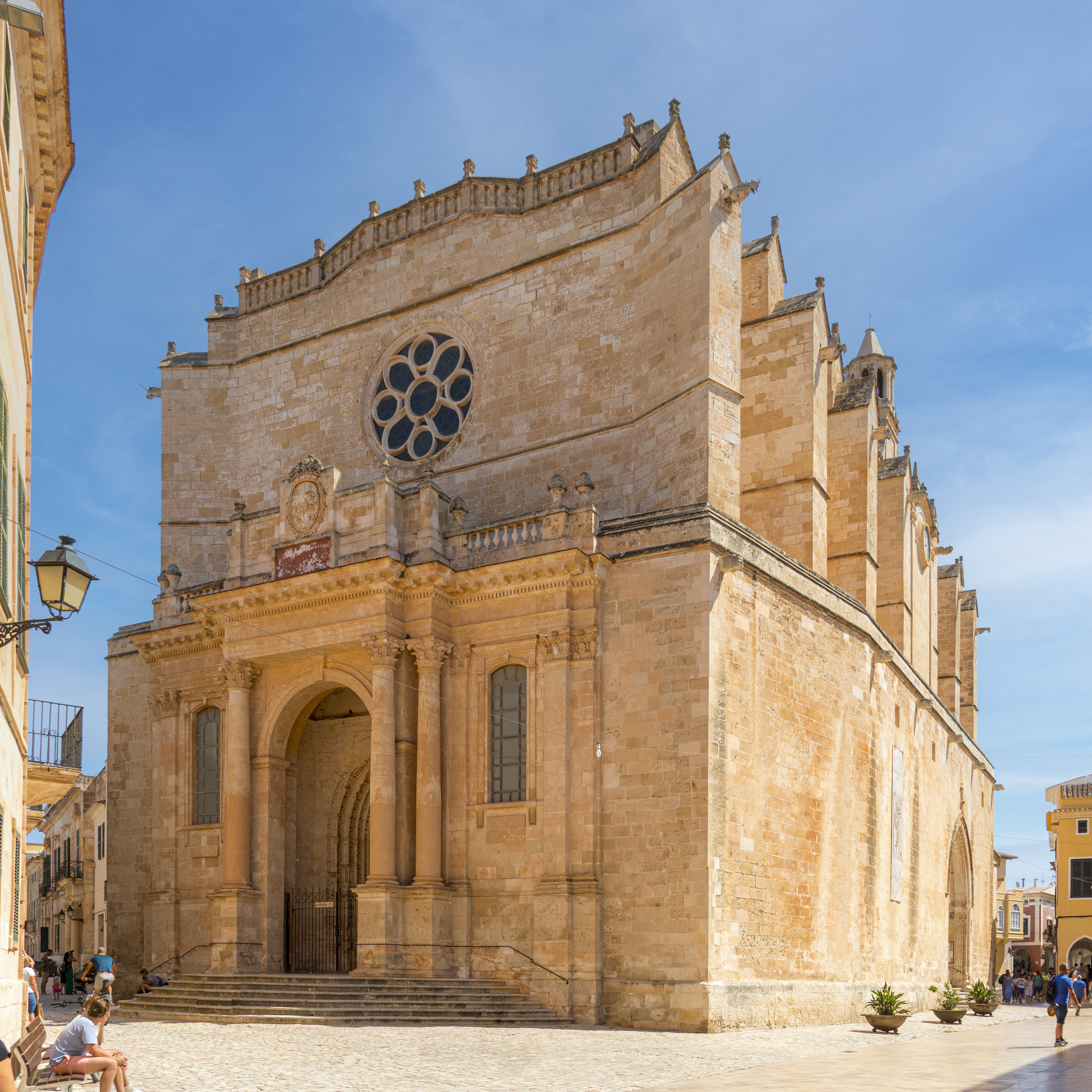
- South-west view in 2022
- Menorca Cathedral
- 40°0′6″N 3°50′15″E
- Location: Ciutadella de Menorca
- Address: Plaça de la Catedral
- Country: Spain
- Denomination: Catholic
- Website: bisbatdemenorca.com

History
- Status: Cathedral
- Dedication: Mary, mother of Jesus
- Dedicated: 1795

Architecture
- Style: Gothic
- Years built: 14th Century

Specifications
- Height: 23 m (75 ft 6 in)

Administration
- Metropolis: Valencia
- Diocese: Menorca

Clergy
- Bishop: Gerard Villalonga Hellín

Spanish Cultural Heritage
- Type: Non-movable
- Criteria: Monument
- Designated: 3 June 1931
- Reference no.: RI-51-0010904

The Cathedral-Basilica of Saint Mary is a Roman Catholic church in Ciutadella de Menorca, in the island of Menorca, in Balearic Islands, Spain. It was constructed from 1300 to 1362 in the Catalan Gothic style. It was sacked and desecrated at least twice, in 1558 by the Ottomans and in 1936 during the Spanish Civil War, and restored both times.

== History ==
King Alfonso III of Aragon conquered the island in 1287 and ordered the construction of the church on the site of an old mosque.

Construction started in 1300 and was finished in 1362, creating a building of the Catalan Gothic style, and is notable for the width of the nave, flanked by six chapels to each side. The five-sided apse is oriented to the east.

After the desecration and devastation of the cathedral by the Ottoman Empire Turks under Admiral of the Ottoman Fleet Pialí Bajá in 1558 and the collapse of the vaults of the apse in 1626, the damage was quickly repaired in the original style.

In 1795, with the restoration of the old bishopric of Menorca (which had existed at start of the 5th century) the parish church of Ciutadella came to be the cathedral of the new diocese.

Under Bishop Juano, the main façade was rebuilt in 1813 in a neoclassical style, contrasting with the Gothic style of the building, while the restored side door called the Porta de la Llum ("Portal of the Light") keeps some of its medieval ornamentation.

In the interior, the baroque chapel of the Angelus dates from the start of the 17th century with exquisitely carved columns.

The cathedral was sacked and desecrated in the first days of the Spanish Civil War in 1936, but was restored in its current form by Bishop Bartolomé Pascual between 1939 and 1941. During this work, the Quire was moved from the nave to its current location in the apse.

== Interior ==
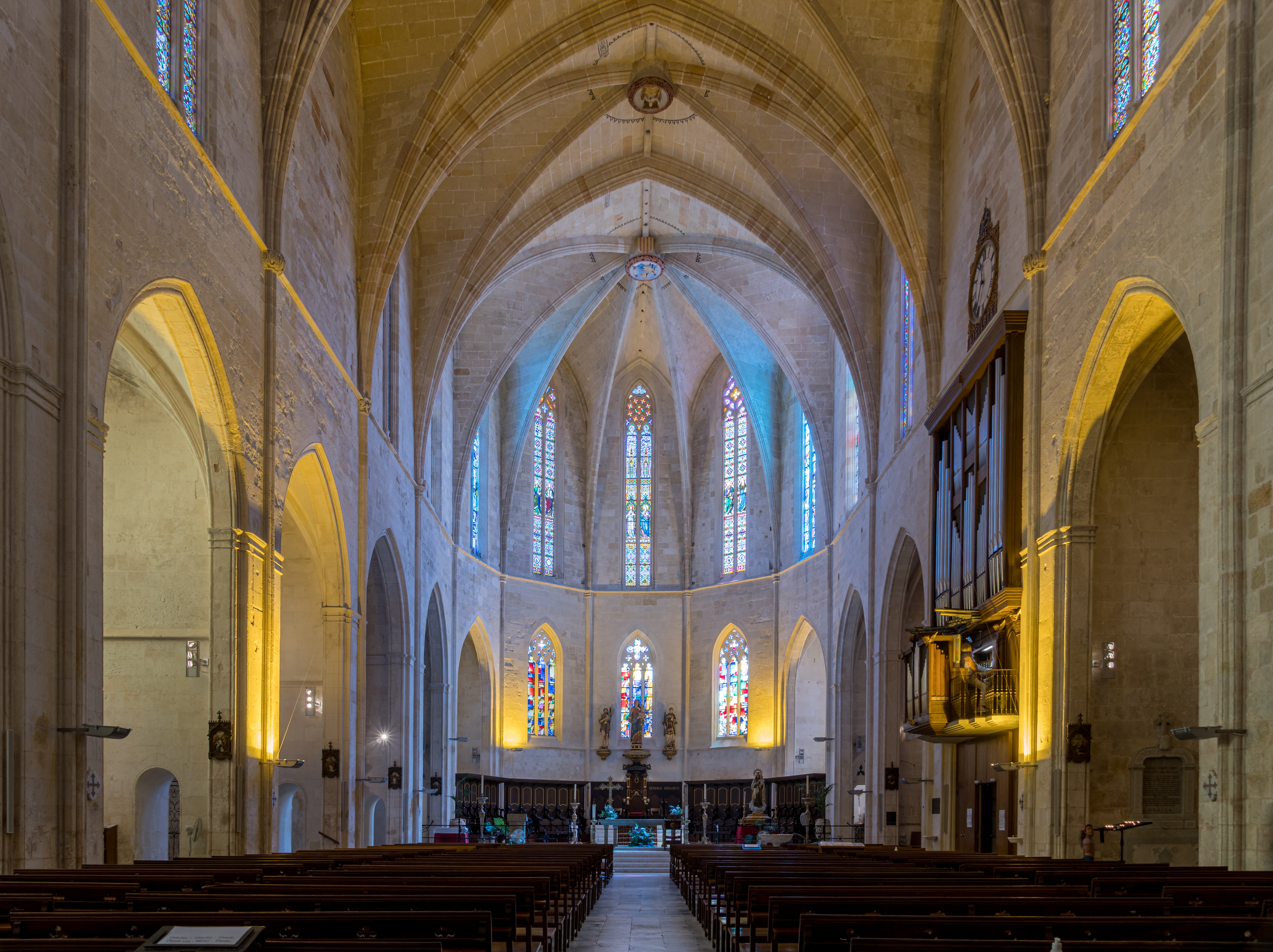
Main nave

The great altar is a marble monolith covered by a 15-metre-high canopy. At the back of the apse, under an image of the Virgin in the mystery of the presentation of Jesus in the temple, is found the episcopal throne, made with Roman marble blessed by Pope Pius XII to signify the links of faith and devotion of this church of Menorca to St. Peter's Basilica. In 1953 Pope Pius XII gave the cathedral the title of minor basilica.

From 1987, the seventh centennial of the conquest of Menorca by the Crown of Aragon, a new plan was undertaken for the restoration and development of the cathedral.
