= Pedro Antón Serra =

Spanish Roman Catholic prelate

Most Reverend Pedro Antón Serra
- Church: Catholic Church
- Diocese: Diocese of Lérida
- In office: 1621–1632
- Predecessor: Francisco Virgili
- Successor: Antonio Pérez (archbishop)

Orders
- Consecration: 1 Aug 1621 by Andrés Balaguer Salvador

Personal details
- Born: 1585 Zaragoza, Spain
- Died: 17 February 1632 (aged 46–47)

Pedro Antón Serra (1585–1632) was a Roman Catholic prelate who served as Bishop of Lérida (1621–1632).

== Biography ==
Pedro Antón Serra was born in Zaragoza, Spain in 1585. On 19 Apr 1621, he was appointed during the papacy of Pope Gregory XV as Bishop of Lérida. On 1 Aug 1621, he was consecrated bishop by Andrés Balaguer Salvador, Bishop of Orihuela, with Miguel Angulo Gómez de Carvajal, Titular Bishop of Coronea, and Tomás Espinosa, Titular Bishop of Marocco o Marruecoswith, serving as co-consecrators. He served as Bishop of Lérida until his death on 17 Feb 1632.

== External links and additional sources ==
- Cheney, David M. "Diocese of Lleida". Catholic-Hierarchy.org. (for Chronology of Bishops) ^{[self-published]}
- Chow, Gabriel. "Diocese of Lleida (Spain)". GCatholic.org. (for Chronology of Bishops) ^{[self-published]}

Catholic Church titles
Preceded by Francisco Virgili	Bishop of Lérida; 1621–1632	Succeeded by Antonio Pérez (archbishop)
