= Diocese of Lleida =

Roman Catholic diocese in Spain

Coordinates: 41.6148°N 0.621094°E

Diocese of Lleida Dioecesis Ilerdensis Diócesis de Lérida (es) Diòcesi de Lleida (ca)

Catholic
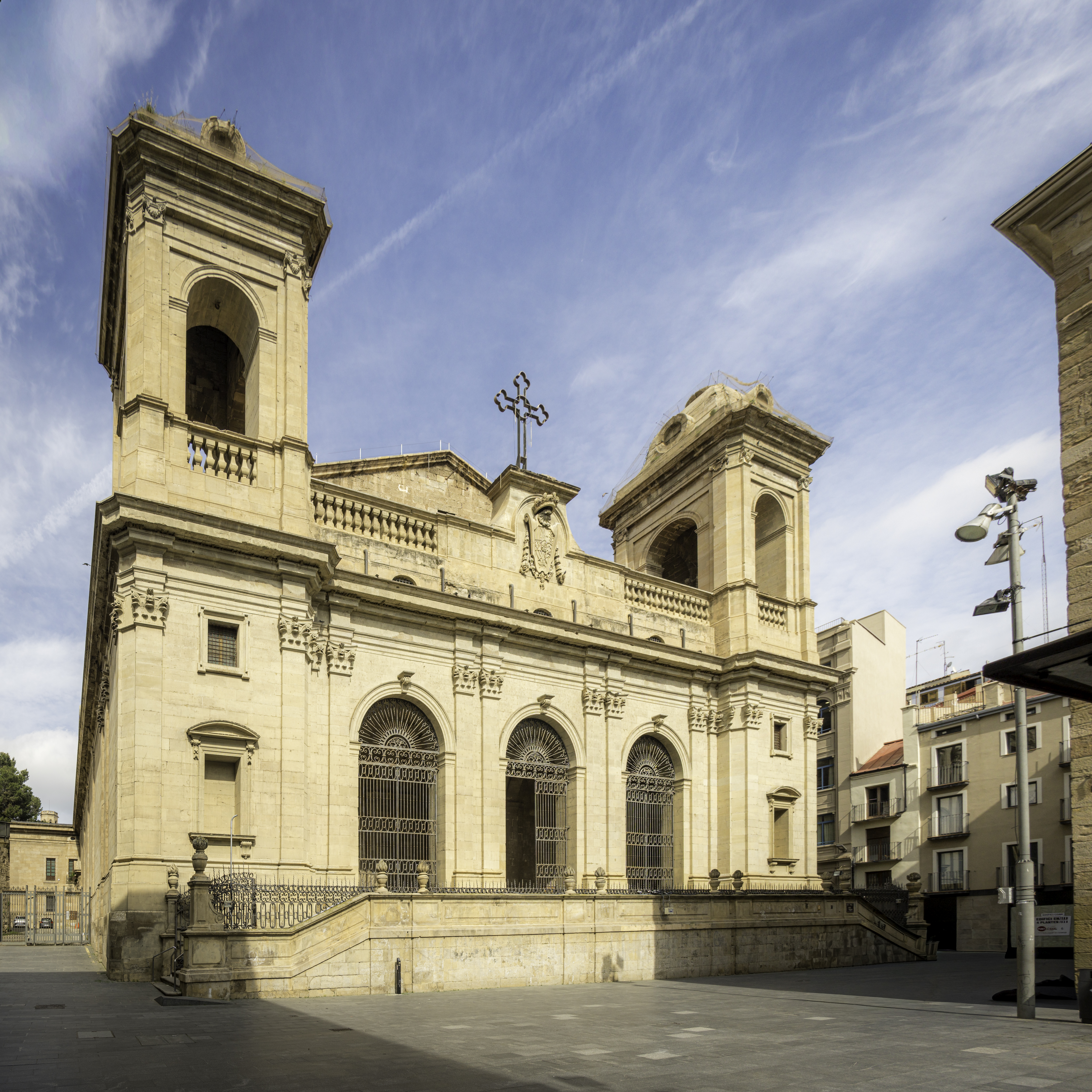
- Cathedral of the Assumption in Lleida

Location
- Country: Spain
- Ecclesiastical province: Tarragona
- Metropolitan: Tarragona

Statistics
- Area: 2,977 km^{2} (1,149 sq mi)
- Population: Total; Catholics: (as of 2016); 236,953; 203,520 (85.9%)

Information
- Denomination: Catholic
- Sui iuris church: Latin Church
- Rite: Roman Rite
- Established: 5th Century (As Diocese of Lérida); 31 October 1992 (As 31 October 1992)
- Cathedral: Cathedral of the Assumption in Lleida

Current leadership
- Pope: Leo XIV
- Bishop: Daniel Palau Valero
- Metropolitan Archbishop: Joan Planellas i Barnosell
- Bishops emeritus: Salvador Giménez Valls; Juan Piris Frígola Bishop Emeritus (2008–2015)

Map

Website
- bisbatlleida.org

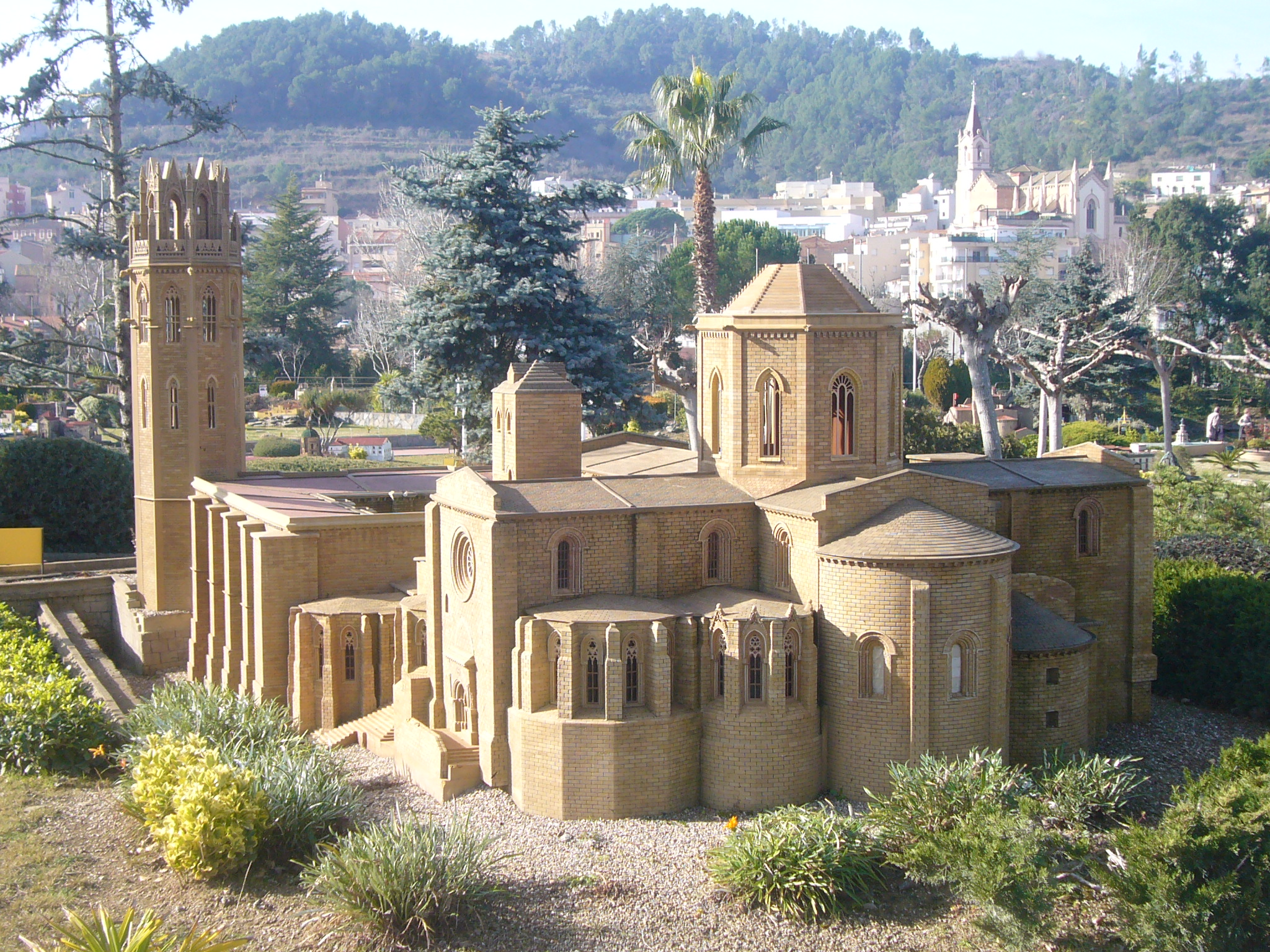
A model of the old cathedral of Lleida

The Diocese of Lleida, or Diocese of Lerida (Latin: Dioecesis Ilerdensis) is a Latin Church diocese of the Catholic Church located in north-eastern Spain, in the province of Lleida, part of the autonomous community of Catalonia. The diocese forms part of the ecclesiastical province of Tarragona, and is thus suffragan to the Archdiocese of Tarragona.

The diocese of Lleida was created in the 3rd century. After the Moorish conquest of Lleida in 716 the episcopal see was moved to Roda (until 1101) and then to Barbastro (1101–1149). The city of Lleida was conquered from the Moors by the Count Ramon Berenguer IV of Barcelona in 1149, and the see was again transferred to its original seat. The Bishop's Palace is located in Rambla d'Aragó.

Lleida is one of the most populous cities in Catalonia, built on the right bank of the River Segre, about 100 miles from Barcelona. The town is oriental in appearance, and its streets are narrow and crooked. The population in 1900 was 23,683. The old Byzantine-Gothic Cathedral, of which the ruins are to be seen on the citadel, dates from 1203. During the Middle Ages the University of Lleida was famous; it was suppressed in 1717, however, the Catalan Parliament passed an act which established the University again in 1991.

== History ==
=== Roman period ===
Lleida was the Roman Ilerda, or Herda. During the Punic Wars it sided with the Carthaginians; near it Hanno was defeated by Scipio in 216 BC, and Julius Cæsar defeated Pompey's forces in 49 BC.

La Canal says that the diocese was erected in 600, but others maintain it goes back to the third century, and there is mention of a St. Lycerius, or Glycerius, as Bishop of Lleida in AD 269.

=== Visigoth and Muslim period (until 1149) ===
In 546AD (dated to 524AD in some sources), a Council to regulate ecclesiastical discipline was called in Lerida. The Council prohibited clerics from taking up arms and shedding blood, and addressed issues of abortion, infanticide, incest, and clerical discipline. The Council also addressed a practice that had developed in the Iberian Peninsula, whereby on the death of a bishop, lower ranking clerics (and on occasions the bishops relatives) would ransack and loot the deceased bishops home. The council confirmed that the deceased bishops executors should occupy the bishops residence with guards and defend the premises. Three years later a synod at Valencia changed the protector to the nearest neighboring bishop. Clerics who were caught looting would also be excommunicated. The regulations of the Council were adopted by the General Canon Law of the Roman Catholic Church for implementation in all dioceses.

The signatures of other bishops of Lleida are attached to various councils up to the year 716, when the Moors took possession of the town, and the see was removed to Roda. An unbroken list of bishops of Lleida goes back to the year 887.

In 1101 King Pedro I of Aragon took the city of Barbastro from the Moors and transferred the see from Roda to Barbastro. The first bishop, Poncio, went to Rome to obtain the pope's permission for this transfer.

=== Diocese of Lleida (from 1149) ===
The city of Lleida was conquered from the Moors by the Count Ramon Berenguer IV of Barcelona in 1149, and the episcopal see was again transferred to its original seat.

A council in 1173 was presided over by Cardinal Giacinto Bobone, who afterwards became Pope Celestine III. A council in 1246 absolved king James I of Aragon from the sacrilege of cutting out the tongue of the Bishop of Girona.

The seminary was founded in 1722.

During the Peninsular War the French held it (1810), and in 1823 Spain once more obtained possession of it. Owing to its natural position its strategic value has always been very great, and it was strongly fortified in 1910.

The cathedral chapter prior to the Concordat of 1851 consisted of 6 dignities, 24 canons, 22 benefices, but after the concordat the number was reduced to 16 canons and 12 beneficed clerics.

In 1910 the Catholic population of the diocese was 185,000, scattered over 395 parishes and ministered to by 598 priests. Besides 395 churches for public worship, there were in the diocese five religious communities of men, six of women, and several hospitals in charge of nuns. The seminary accommodated 500 students.

=== 1995–1998 Segregation of the Western Parishes ===
In 1995, following the Ilerdensis et Barbastrensis de finum mutatione decree, 84 culturally Catalan La Franja parishes that had traditionally belonged to the Roman Catholic Diocese of Lleida for over eight centuries, were segregated and transferred to the Roman Catholic Diocese of Barbastro-Monzón. These were followed by a further 27 parishes in June 1998. The amputated parishes were in the Llitera and Baix Cinca Catalan-speaking Aragonese areas.

After the parish segregation a controversy began regarding the return of ancient works of art belonging to the segregated parishes and which were stored at the Lleida Diocesan Museum. The decree and the ensuing controversies were perceived as anti-Catalan measures by many in Lleida and in the concerned parishes, as they were not previously consulted, and part of a strategy to assimilate the La Franja people into the Spanish-speaking mainstream congregation by cutting them off from their cultural roots.

== Bishops of Lleida (6th to 9th centuries) ==
All the names (except the first one) are given in Catalan:

- Itxió 203
- Sant Filó 227
- Joan 230
- Pere 258
- Màrius Seli 259
- c. 269 : St. Lleïr — (Mentioned in 269)
- c. 516 : Oronci — (Mentioned between 516 and 517)
- c. 519 : Pere
- c. 540 : Andreu — (Mentioned in 540)
- c. 546 : Februari — (Mentioned in 546)
- c. 589 : Polibi — (Mentioned in 589)
- c. 592 : Julià — (Mentioned in 592)
- c. 599 : Ameli — (Mentioned in 599)
- c. 614 : Gomarel — (Mentioned in 614)
- c. 635 : Fructuós — (Mentioned between 633 and 638)
- c. 653 : Gandelè — (Mentioned in 653)
- c. 690 : Eusend — (Mentioned between 683 and 693)
- c. 715 : Esteve — (before 714 – after 719)
- c. 780 : San Medard — (after 778)
- c. 842 : Jacob

After the Moorish conquest the Diocese of Lleida is transferred to Roda.

== Bishops of Roda (until 1101) ==
After the Moorish conquest the Diocese of Lleida is transferred to Roda. All the names are given in Catalan:

- 887–922 : Adulf — (since before 887 to 922)
- 923–955 : Ató
- 955–975 : Odisend
- 988–991 : Aimeric — (since before 988 to 991)
- 996---?--- : Jacob — (since before 996)
- 1006–1015 : Aimeric II — (since before 1006 to 1015)
- 1017–1019 : Borrell
- 1023–1067 : Arnulf
- 1068–1075 : Salomó
- 1075–1076 : Arnulf II
- 1076–1094 : Pere Ramon Dalmaci
- 1094–1096 : Llop
- 1097–1100 : Ponç

In 1101 the Diocese of Roda is transferred to Barbastro.

== Bishops of Barbastro-Roda (1101–1149) ==
In 1101 the Diocese of Roda is transferred to Barbastro. All the names are given in Catalan:

- 1101–1104 : Ponç
- 1104–1126 : St. Ramon — (named Ramon II in the Catholic Encyclopedia)
- ---------1126 : Esteve
- 1126–1134: Pere Guillem
- 1134 : Ramir, a prince of the royal house of Aragon — (Elected)
- 1135–1143 : Gaufrid
- 1143–1149 : Guillermo Pérez de Ravitats

In 1149 the episcopal see returned to Lleida.

== Bishops of Lleida (since 1149) ==
In 1149 the episcopal see returned to Lleida.

- 1149–1176 : Guillem Pérez de Ravitats
- 1177–1190 : Guillem Berenguer
- 1191–1205 : Gombald de Camporells
- 1205–1235 : Berenguer d'Erill
- 1236–1238 : Pere d'Albalat
- 1238–1247 : Ramon de Siscar
- 1248–1255 : Guillem de Barberà
- --------–1256 : Berenguer de Peralta
- 1257–1278 : Guillem de Moncada
- 1282–c. 1286 Guillem Bernáldez de Fluvià — (1282 – before 1286)
- 1290–1298 : Gerard d'Andria
- 1299–1308 : Pere de Rei
- 1308–1313 : Ponç d'Aguilaniu
- 1314–1321 : Guillem d'Aranyó — (before 1314 – 1321)
- 1322–1324 : Ponç de Villamur
- 1324–1327 : Ramon d'Avignó
- 1327–1334 : Arnald de Cescomes
- 1334–1340 : Ferrer de Colom
- 1341–1348 : Jaume Sitjó
- 1348–1360 : Esteve Mulceo
- 1361–1380 : Romeu de Cescomes
- 1380–1386 : Ramón
- 1387–1399 : Gerau de Requesens
- --------–1399 : Pere de Santcliment
- --------–1403 : Joan de Baufés
- 1403–1407 : Pere de Sagarriga i de Pau
- 1407–1411 : Pere de Cardona
- 1415–1434 : Domènec Ram i Lanaja
- 1435–1449 : García Aznárez de Añon
- 1449–1459 : Antoni Cerdà
- 1459–1510 : Lluís Joan de Milà
- 1510–1512 : Joan d'Enguera
- 1512–1542 : Jaime de Conchillos
- --------–1542 : Martí Valero
- 1543–1553 : Ferran de Loaces i Pérez
- 1553–1554 : Joan Arias
- 1556–1559 : Miquel Despuig i Vacarte
- 1561–1576 : Antonio Agustín y Albanell
- 1577–1578 : Miguel Thomàs de Taxaquet
- 1580–1581 : Carles Domènech
- 1583–1585 : Benet de Tocco
- 1585–1586 : Gaspar Joan de la Figuera
- 1586–1591 : Joan Martínez de Villatoriel — (Inquisitor General).
- 1592–1597 : Pere d'Aragó
- 1599–1620 : Francesco Virgili
- 1621–1632 : Pere Anton Serra
- --------–1633 : Antonio Pérez (archbishop)
- --------–1634 : Pere de Magarola i Fontanet
- 1635–1642 : Bernat Caballero de Paredes
- 1644–1650 : Pere de Santiago
- 1656–1664 : Miquel de Escartín
- 1664–1667 : Brauli Sunyer
- 1668–1673 : Josep Minot
- 1673–1680 : Jaume de Copons
- 1680–1681 : Francesc Berardo
- 1682–1698 : Miguel Jerónimo de Molina
- 1699–1700 : Joan de Santamaríi Alonso i Valeria
- 1701–1714 : Francesc de Solís
- 1714–1735 : Francesc de Olasso Hipenza
- 1736–1756 : Gregori Galindo
- 1757–1770 : Manuel Macías Pedrejón
- 1771–1783 : Joaquim Antoni Sánchez Ferragudo
- 1783–1816 : Jeroni Maria de Torres
- 1816–1817 : Manuel del Villar
- --------–1818 : Remigi Lasanta Ortega
- 1819–1824 : Simó Antoni de Rentería i Reyes
- 1824–1832 : Pau Colmenares
- 1833–1844 : Julià Alonso
- 1848–1850 : Josep Domènec Costa i Borràs
- 1850–1861 : Pere Ciril Uriz i Labayru
- 1862–1870 : Marià Puigllat i Amigó
- 1875–1889 : Tomàs Costa i Fornaguera
- 1889–1905 : Josep Meseguer i Costa
- 1905–1914 : Juan Antonio Ruano y Martín
- 1914–1925 : Josep Miralles Sbert
- 1926–1930 : Manuel Irurita Almandoz
- 1935–1936 : Salvio Huix Miralpeix
- 1938–1943 : Manuel Moll i Salord
- 1944–1947 : Joan Villar Sanz
- 1947–1967 : Aurelio del Pino Gómez
- 1968–1999 : Ramon Malla Call
- 1999–2007 : Francesc-Xavier Ciuraneta Aymí
- 2008–2015 : Juan Piris Frígola
- 2015–2025 : Salvador Giménez Valls
- 2025–present : Daniel Palau Valero

== See also ==
- La Franja
- Bishop of Lleida

== Sources ==
- (in Spanish) IBERCRONOX: Obispado de Lérida (Ilerda) and Obispado de Barbastro-Monzón
