= Villaverde de Medina =

Coordinates: 41°18′N 5°01′W

Villaverde de Medina, Spain
- Flag Coat of arms
- Interactive map of Villaverde de Medina, Spain
- Country: Spain
- Autonomous community: Castile and León
- Province: Valladolid
- Municipality: Villaverde de Medina

Area
  - Total: 58.20 km^{2} (22.47 sq mi)
- Elevation: 723 m (2,372 ft)

Population (2025-01-01)
  - Total: 497
  - Density: 8.54/km^{2} (22.1/sq mi)
- Time zone: UTC+1 (CET)
  - Summer (DST): UTC+2 (CEST)

Villaverde de Medina is a municipality located in the province of Valladolid, Castile and León, Spain. According to the 2004 census (INE), the municipality had a population of 587 inhabitants.

== Gallery ==
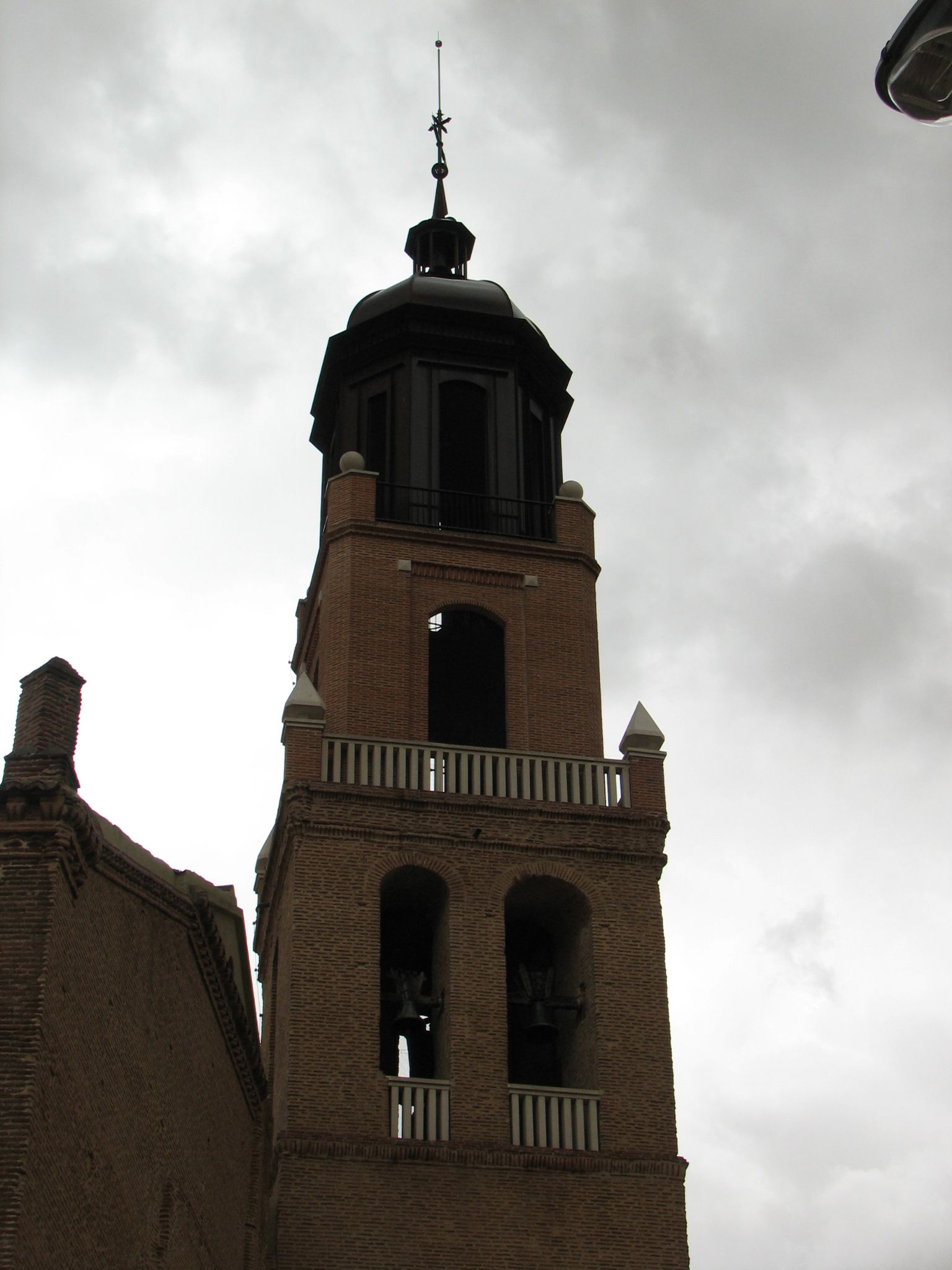
Church of Our Lady of the Castle - Tower
