= Ramón Iglesias i Navarri =

Spanish Roman Catholic bishop

The Most Reverend Archbishop Ramón Iglesias i Navarri
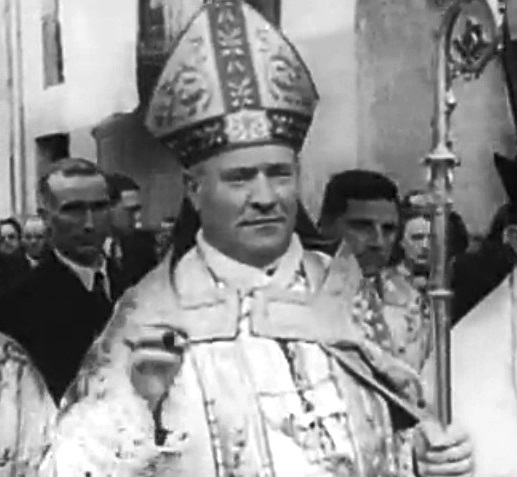
- Iglesias in 1942

Co-Prince of Andorra
- Reign: 29 December 1943 – 29 April 1969
- Predecessor: Justí Guitart i Vilardebó
- Successor: Ramón Malla Call (acting)
- Co-Prince: Vincent Auriol (1947‍–‍54); René Coty (1954‍–‍59); Charles de Gaulle (1959‍–‍69)
- Bishop of Urgell
- See: Diocese of Urgell
- Installed: 4 April 1943
- Term ended: 29 April 1969
- Predecessor: Justí Guitart i Vilardebó
- Successor: Ramón Malla Call (acting)

Orders
- Ordination: 14 July 1912
- Consecration: 4 April 1943 by Gaetano Cicognani

Personal details
- Born: 28 January 1889 La Vall de Boí, Spain
- Died: 31 March 1972 (aged 83)
- Denomination: Catholic Church

Ramón Iglesias i Navarri (28 January 1889 – 31 March 1972) was a Spanish Roman Catholic bishop. He was the Bishop of Urgell and, as such, the Episcopal Co-Prince of Andorra from 4 April 1943, until 29 April 1969. During World War II, he helped to keep Andorra neutral and strongly promoted a Spanish influence in the principality. It is during his time that tourism was developed. Navarri was ordained priest on 14 July 1912, at the age of 23.

Navarri visited Andorra at least once a year while serving as co-prince.

Regnal titles
Religious titles
Preceded by Justí Guitart i Vilardebó	Co-prince of Andorra and Bishop of Urgell; 1943–1969	Succeeded by Ramón Malla Call (acting)
