= Diocese of Solsona =

Roman Catholic diocese in Spain

Coordinates: 41°58′47″N 1°30′47″E

Diocese of Solsona Dioecesis Celsonensis Diòcesi de Solsona (ca) Diócesis de Solsona (es)

Catholic
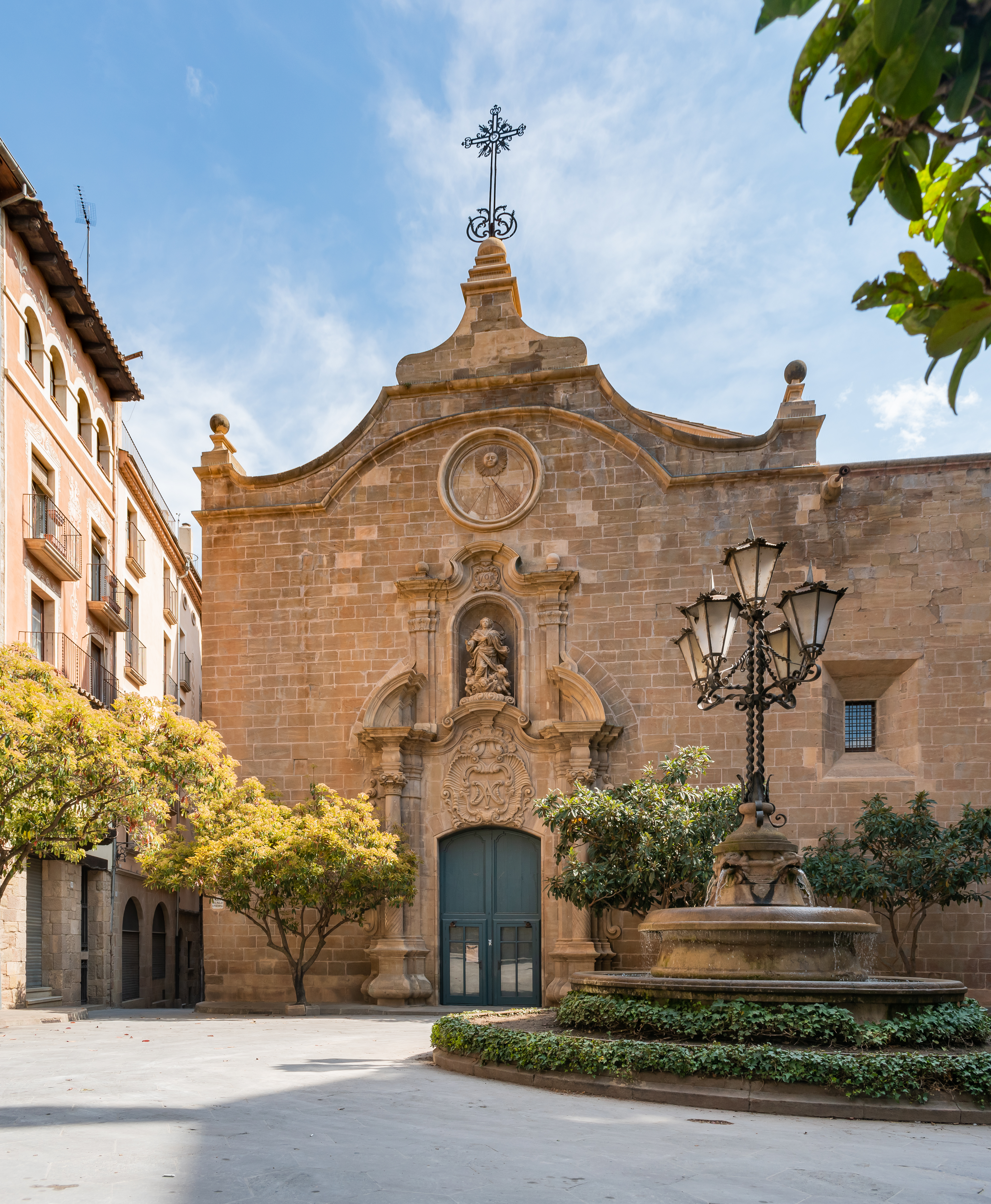
- Solsona Cathedral

Location
- Country: Spain
- Ecclesiastical province: Tarragona
- Metropolitan: Tarragona

Statistics
- Area: 3,536 km^{2} (1,365 sq mi)
- Population: Total; Catholics: (as of 2010); 139,900; 128,700 (92%)

Information
- Rite: Latin Rite
- Established: 19 July 1593
- Cathedral: Cathedral of St Mary in Solsona

Current leadership
- Pope: Leo XIV
- Bishop: Francisco Conesa Ferrer
- Metropolitan Archbishop: Joan Planellas i Barnosell

Website
- Website of the Diocese

The Diocese of Solsona (Latin: Dioecesis Celsonensis) is a Latin Church diocese of the Catholic Church located in the city of Solsona in the ecclesiastical province of Tarragona in Catalonia, Spain.

== History ==
- 19 July 1593: Established as Diocese of Solsona from the Diocese of Urgell and Diocese of Vic

== Ordinaries ==
- Luis Sans y Códol (3 Oct 1594 – 20 Aug 1612 Appointed, Bishop of Barcelona)
- Juan Alvarez Zapata, O. Cist. (11 Mar 1613 – 13 Oct 1623 Died)
- Miguel Santos de San Pedro (15 Apr 1624 – 13 Nov 1630 Appointed, Archbishop of Granada)
- Pedro Puigmartí Funes, O.S.B. (16 Dec 1630 – Nov 1632 Died)
- Diego Serrano Sotomayor, O. de M. (3 Dec 1635 – 30 May 1639 Appointed, Bishop of Segorbe)
- Pedro (de Santiago) Anglada Sánchez, O.A.R. (30 Jan 1640 – 14 Nov 1644 Appointed, Bishop of Lerida)
- Francisco Roger, O.P. (18 Sep 1656 – 18 Jan 1663 Died)
- Luis de Pons y de Esquerrer, Order of Saint Benedict (11 Aug 1664 – 4 Jan 1685 Died)
- Manuel de Alba (10 Sep 1685 – 24 Aug 1693 Appointed, Bishop of Barcelona)
- Juan Alfonso Valerià y Aloza, O.F.M. (8 Feb 1694 – 1 Jun 1699 Appointed, Bishop of Lerida)
- Guillermo Goñalons, O.S.A. (30 Mar 1700 – 12 Aug 1708 Died)
- Francisco Dorda, O. Cist. (19 Feb 1710 – 3 Dec 1716 Died)
- Pedro Magaña, O.S.B. (10 May 1717 – 9 Feb 1718 Died)
- Tomás Broto y Pérez (27 May 1720 – 8 Apr 1736 Died)
- José Esteban Noriega, O. Praem. (27 Jan 1738 – 10 May 1739 Died)
- Francisco Zarceño Martínez, O.SS.T. (14 Dec 1739 – 23 Jan 1746 Died)
- José Mezquía Díaz de Arrízola, O. de M. (16 Sep 1746 – 9 Sep 1772 Died)
- Rafael Lasala y Locela, O.S.A. (15 Mar 1773 – 17 Jun 1792 Died)
- Agustín Vázquez Varela, O. Cist. (17 Jun 1793 – 11 Feb 1794 Died)
- Pedro Nolasco Mora Mora, O. de M. (12 Sep 1794 – 1 Mar 1811 Died)
- Manuel Benito y Tabernero (19 Dec 1814 – 25 Jul 1830 Died)
- Juan José Tejada Sáenz, O. de M. (2 Jul 1832 – 15 Jun 1838 Died)
- Valentín Comellas y Santamaría (18 Dec 1919 – 19 Mar 1945 Died)
- Vicente Enrique y Tarancón (25 Nov 1945 – 12 Apr 1964 Appointed, Archbishop of Oviedo)
- José Bascuñana y López (20 May 1964 – 19 Feb 1977 Resigned)
- Miguel Moncadas Noguera (1 Apr 1977 – 5 Aug 1989 Died)
- Antonio Deig Clotet (7 Mar 1990 – 28 Jul 2001 Retired)
- Jaume Traserra Cunillera (28 Jul 2001 – 3 Nov 2010 Retired)
- Xavier Novell i Gomà (3 Nov 2010 – 23 Aug 2021 Resigned, to marry)
- Francisco Conesa Ferrer (3 January 2022 – present)

== See also ==
- Roman Catholicism in Spain
