= Diocese of Barbastro-Monzón =

Roman Catholic diocese in Spain

Coordinates: 41.9642°N 0.1711°E

Diocese of Barbastro-Monzón Dioecesis Barbastrensis-Montisonensis Diócesis de Barbastro-Monzón

Catholic
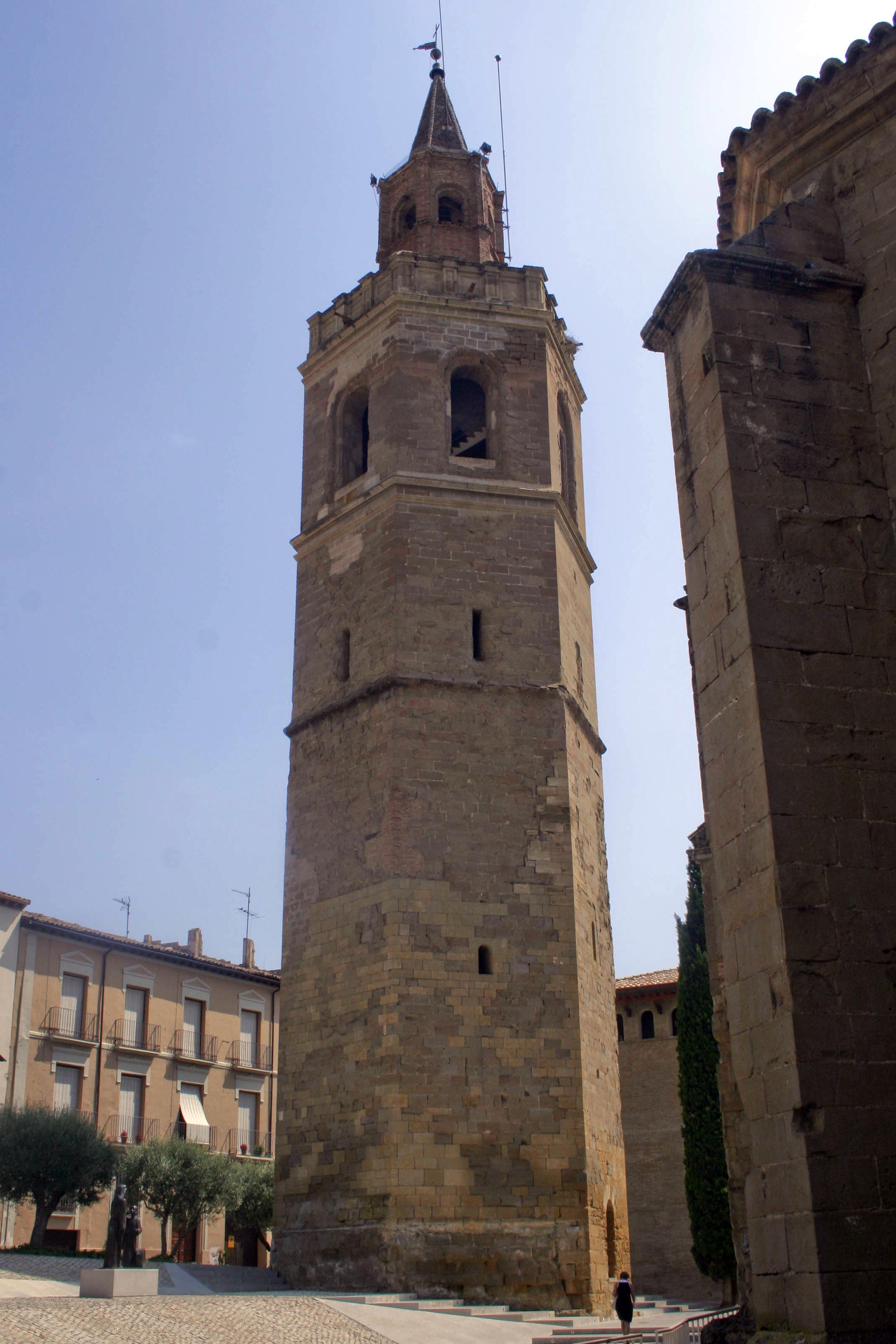
- Barbastro Cathedral Clock Tower

Location
- Country: Spain
- Ecclesiastical province: Zaragoza
- Metropolitan: Zaragoza

Statistics
- Area: 8,321 km^{2} (3,213 sq mi)
- Population: Total; Catholics: (as of 2012); 104,700; 96,600 (92.3%)
- Parishes: 242

Information
- Denomination: Catholic
- Sui iuris church: Latin Church
- Rite: Roman Rite
- Established: Name Changed: 15 June 1995
- Cathedral: Cathedral of the Assumption of Our Lady in Barbastro
- Co-cathedral: Co-Cathedral of Our Lady in Monzón

Current leadership
- Pope: Leo XIV
- Bishop: Angel Javier Perez Pueyo
- Metropolitan Archbishop: Carlos Manuel Escribano Subías

Map

Website
- diocesisbarbastromonzon.org

The Diocese of Barbastro-Monzón (Latin: Dioecesis Barbastrensis-Montisonensis) is a Latin diocese of the Catholic Church located in north-eastern Spain, in the province of Huesca, part of the autonomous community of Aragón. The diocese forms part of the ecclesiastical province of Zaragoza (province), and is thus suffragan to the Archdiocese of Zaragoza.

The city of Barbastro is at the junction of the rivers Cinca and Vero. The diocese is bounded on the north by the Pyrenees, on the east and south by the Diocese of Lerida (Spanish: Lérida), and on the west by those of Huesca and Jaca.

The cathedral, the episcopal palace, the seminary, and the college of the Clerks Regular of the Pious Schools, or Piarists, are among the most noted buildings in Barbastro.

Besides the seminary for the education of young ecclesiastics, there are various communities in the diocese devoted to a contemplative life and the education of the young, including: the Piarists, the Sons of the Immaculate Heart of Mary, the Poor Clares, and the Capuchin nuns have foundations in the capital, the Benedictines in the town of Pueyo, and the Discalced Carmelites in Graus and Salas Altas. There are schools in all the towns of the diocese.

== History ==
=== Diocese of Barbastro-Roda (1101–1149) ===
With the Umayyad invasion of Spain in the 8th century the Moors' northward push led to the fall of Lerida, in 716, whereupon the Diocese of Lerida was removed to Roda de Isabena.

By the 12th century, the Reconquest of Spain, pushed the borders back south again, such that Lerida was able to reassume control of its diocese, after 300 years, and Barbastro (Latin: Barbatius, French: Barbazan, Italian: Barbaccia, Barbazza, Barbazzi) was strategically chosen to take over the episcopal see from Roda. In 1101, King Pedro I sent Barbastro's first bishop, Poncio, to Rome to obtain the Pope's permission for the transfer, which was approved.

=== Diocese of Lerida (1149 – 16th century) ===
In 1149, the Moors in Lerida were vanquished by Count Ramon Berenguer IV of Barcelona and the city regained its episcopal seat and diocesan control of lands.

=== Diocese of Barbastro (1571–1995) ===
Barbastro was annexed to the Diocese of Huesca in the sixteenth century, but in 1571 the Diocese of Barbastro was erected out of part of Huesca. The Concordat of 1851 annexed it once more to Huesca, preserving its name and administration, but being administered by a vicar Apostolic.

By 1907, the diocese was composed of 154 parishes under the supervision of ten archpriests, or vicars. The population was about 240,000. The clergy numbered about 220, and there were 231 churches and 177 chapels.

In 1951, it regained its full independence. During the 20th-century there were two modifications of the extension of the bishopric, the first in 1955 and the second in 1995 and 1998, that is, in two phases:

- Phase 1: On September 2, 1955, 21 Aragonese parishes which, due to historical transfers, had theretofore been under the administration Lleida and Urgell, were returned to Aragonese diocesan administration, under the Bishop of Barbastro.
- Phase 2: Forty years later, on September 17, 1995, the Archpresbyterates of Western and Eastern Ribagorza, and Cinca Medio, were transferred to Aragonese administration.

On June 15, 1998, the remaining parishes in the counties of Bajo Cinca and La Litera were transferred. In that same act, the Church of Santa María del Romeral de Monzón became a Co-cathedral within the Diocese of Barbastro-Monzon.

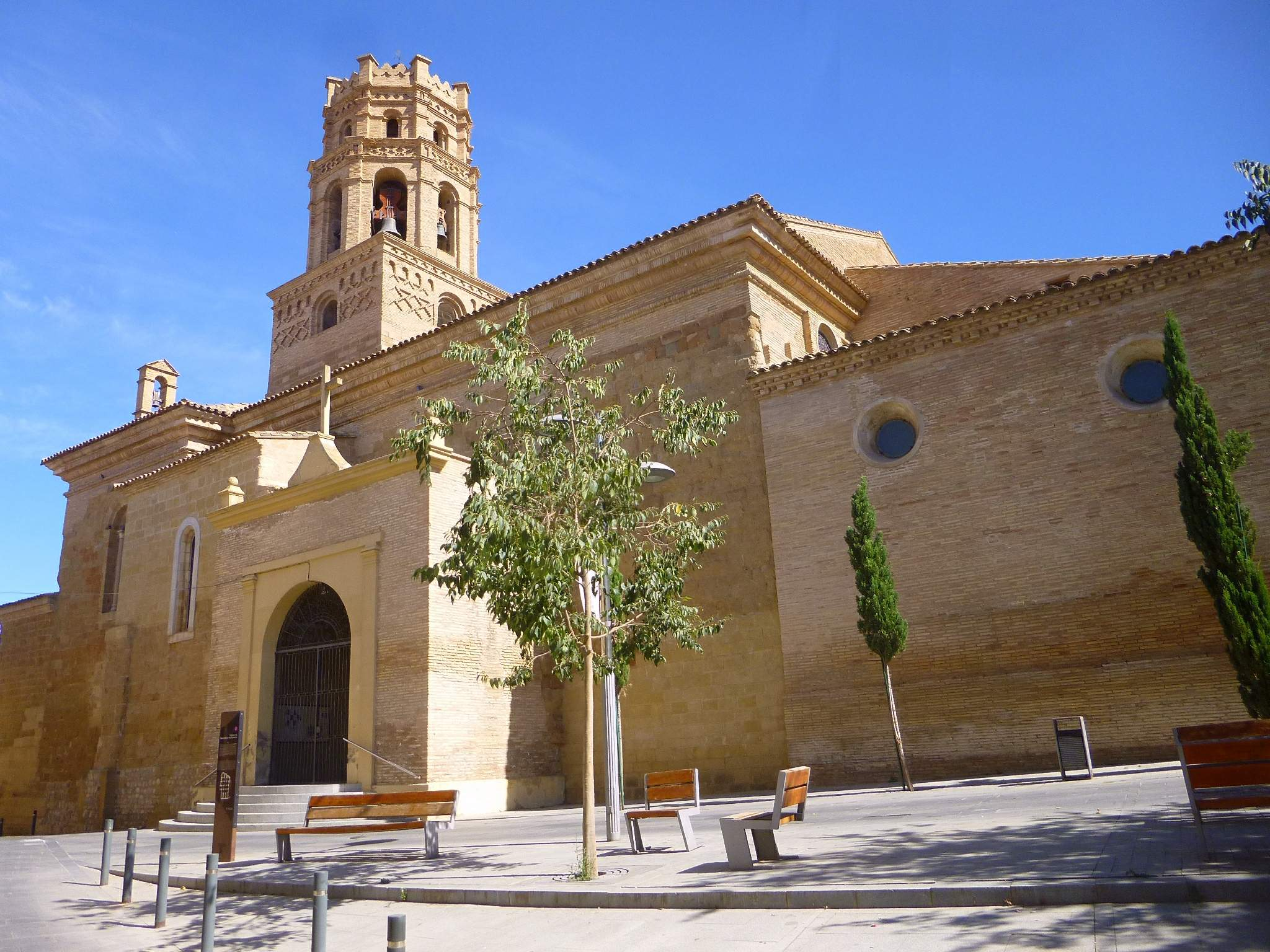
Co-Cathedral of Our Lady in Monzón

At the end of this phased transfer process, the bishopric went from 30,000 faithful and 153 parishes to 100,000 and 264 parishes.

At present the diocese is composed of four Archpresbyterates, or Deaneries:

- Lower Cinca - with 19 parishes and 26,694 inhabitants.
- Cinca Medio - with 39 parishes and 37,150 inhabitants.
- Somontano - with 25 parishes and 18,809 inhabitants.
- Sobrarbe-Ribagorza - with 159 parishes and 16,650 inhabitants.

=== Diocese of Barbastro-Monzón (since 1995) ===
As of 1995, the Diocese of Barbastro was renamed 'Diocese of Barbastro-Monzón', in accordance with the Vatican decree, Ilerdensis et Barbastrensis de finum mutatione. It expanded to include an additional 84 parishes in Eastern Aragon which had been under the temporary administration of the Diocese of Lerida, and transferred back to Aragon under the administration of Barbastro-Monzón. In 1998, a further 27 parishes were returned to Aragonese administration.

With the return of the Parishes to Aragon, property belonging to those places of Worship, including ancient parish registers, altar reliefs, statuary, vestments and other liturgical objects and works of art, which had been stored at the Episcopal See and Seminary of Lerida should have likewise been returned. However, this did not happen and Lerida appealed to Rome to keep the property. The Vatican tribunals declared the Aragonese parishes to be the rightful owners of their respective liturgical property and works of art and sentenced Lerida to return said property to its rightful owners and places of worship. Lerida publicly accepted the Vatican decision but then decided not to comply with it and at the behest of Catalan authorities instead pursued a civil litigation path in order to keep the artwork.

Following the Vatican Tribunal's ruling, Lerida embarked on building a diocesan museum exhibiting only some of the Aragonese works which they refused to return. Local partisan Catalan politics desiring promotion, territorial expansionism, and secession from the State incited anti-Catalan sentiment suggesting that the return of the Aragonese parishes to Aragonese administration was part of a strategy of cultural assimilation of the La Franja people into the Spanish-speaking mainstream congregation by cutting them off from their cultural roots. The Catalan civil litigation process has been unsuccessful thus far, and as of 2019 is still ongoing, simply delaying the completion of the Vatican ruling, which has over the years seen the gradual and partial return of works of art to various Parishes, including the Royal Monastery of Sigena in 2017.

== Bishops of Roda (until 1101) ==
All the names are given in Spanish:

- 887–922 : Adulfo — (since before 887 to 922)
- 923–955 : Atón
- 955–975 : Odisendo
- 988–991 : Aimerico — (since before 988 to 991)
- 996---?--- : Jacobo — (since before 996)
- 1006–1015 : Aimerico II — (since before 1006 to 1015)
- 1017–1019 : Borrell
- 1023–1067 : Arnulfo
- 1068–1075 : Salomón
- 1075–1076 : Arnulfo II
- 1076–1094 : Pedro Ramón Dalmacio
- 1094–1096 : Lupo
- 1097–1100 : Poncio

In 1101 the Diocese of Roda is transferred to Barbastro.

== Bishops of Barbastro-Roda (1101–1149) ==
In 1101 the Diocese of Roda is transferred to Barbastro. All the names are given in Spanish:

- 1101–1104 : Poncio
- 1104–1126 : St. Ramón — (named Ramón II in the Catholic Encyclopedia)
- ---------1126 : Esteban
- 1126–1134: Pedro Guillermo
  - 1134 : Ramiro, a prince of the royal house of Aragon — (Elected)
- 1135–1143 : Gaufrido
- 1143–1149 : Guillermo Pérez de Ravitats

In 1149 the episcopal see is moved to Lleida.

== Bishops of Barbastro (1571–1995) ==
In 1571 the Diocese of Barbastro is erected out of part of the Diocese of Huesca.

- 1573–1585 : Felipe de Urriés y Urriés
- 1585–1595 : Miguel Cercito Bereterra
- 1596–1603 : Carlos Muñoz Serrano
- 1604–1616 : Juan Moriz de Salazar
- 1616–1622 : Jerónimo Bautista Lanuza
- 1622–1625 : Pedro Apaolaza Ramírez
- 1625–1639 : Alfons de Requesens
- 1640–1643 : Bernardo Lacabra
- 1643–1647 : Diego Chueca
- 1647–1656 : Miguel de Escartín Arbeza
- 1656–1673 : Diego Francés de Urritigoyti y Lerma
- 1673–1680 : Iñigo Royo Lasierra
- 1681–1695 : Francisco López de Urraca
- 1695–1696 : Jerónimo López
- 1696–1699 : José Martínez del Villar
- 1700–1708 : Francisco de Paula Garcés y Marcilla
- 1708–1714 : Pedro Gregorio Padilla
- 1714–1717 : Pedro Teodoro Granel Montfort
- 1717–1739 : Carlos Alamán y Ferrer
- 1739–1747 : Francisco Antonio Bustamante Jiménez
- 1748–1750 : Benito Marín
- 1750–1755 : Juan Ladrón de Guevara y Pérez de la Torre
- 1755–1766 : Diego Rivera y Fernández de Veguera
- 1766–1772 : Felipe Perales Mercado
- 1773–1789 : Juan Manuel Cornel Larriba
- 1790–1813 : Agustín Iñigo Abad y Lasierra
- 1815–1828 : Juan Nepomuceno de Lera y Cano
- 1828-1855 : Jaime Fort y Puig
- *1855–1896 : See administered by Capitular Vicars, Sede vacante (Vicarios Capitulares: 1855-1862 : Basilio Gil Bueno, 1862-1881 : Francisco Rufas Corz, 1881-1892 : Juan Antonio Puicercús Abizanda, 1893-1896 : José Laplana Matheo).
  - 1896–1898 : Casimiro Piñera y Naredo — (Obispo titular de Anchialón y Apostolic Administrator de Barbastro)
  - 1898–1905 : Juan Antonio Ruano y Martín — (Apostolic Administrator), born at Gijude del Barro, in the Diocese of Salamanca, 3 Nov., 1848, appointed titular bishop of Claudiopolis, and Administrator of Barbastro, 3 Nov., 1898 and transferred to Lleida, 14 Dec., 1905.
  - 1907–1917 : Isidoro Badia y Sarradell — (Obispo titular de Ascalón y Apostolic Administrator de Barbastro)
  - 1918–1926 : Emilio Jiménez Pérez — (Obispo titular de Antedón y Apostolic Administrator de Barbastro)
  - 1927–1935 : Nicanor Mutiloa e Irurita — (Obispo titular de Querapolis y Apostolic Administrator de Barbastro)
  - 1935-1936 : Florentino Asensio Barroso — (Obispo titular de Eurea de Epiro y Apostolic Administrator de Barbastro)
  - 1938-1946 : Lino Rodrigo Ruesca - (Obispo de Huesca y Apostolic Administrator de Barbastro)
  - 1946–1950 : Arturo Tabera Araoz — (Obispo titular de Lirbe y Apostolic Administrator de Barbastro)
- 02/02/1950 - 13/05/1950 : Arturo Tabera Araoz - (Obispo electo de Barbastro)
  - 1950-1952 : Arturo Tabera Araoz - ( Obispo de Albacete y Apostolic Administrator de Barbastro)
- 1951–1953 : Pedro Cantero Cuadrado
- 1954–1959 : Segundo García de Sierra y Méndez
- 1960–1970 : Jaime Flores Martín
- 1970–1974 : Damián Iguacen Borau
- 1974–1995 : Ambrosio Echebarría Arroita

== Bishops of Barbastro-Monzón (since 1995) ==
- 1995–1999 : Ambrosio Echebarría Arroita
- 1999–2004 : Juan José Omella Omella
- 2004–2014 : Alfonso Milián Sorribas
- 2014−present : Ángel Javier Pérez Pueyo

== See also ==
- List of the Roman Catholic dioceses of Spain.

== Sources ==
- (in Spanish) IBERCRONOX: Obispado de Barbastro-Monzón, geocities.com. Accessed 5 March 2024.
