= Terriente =

- municipality
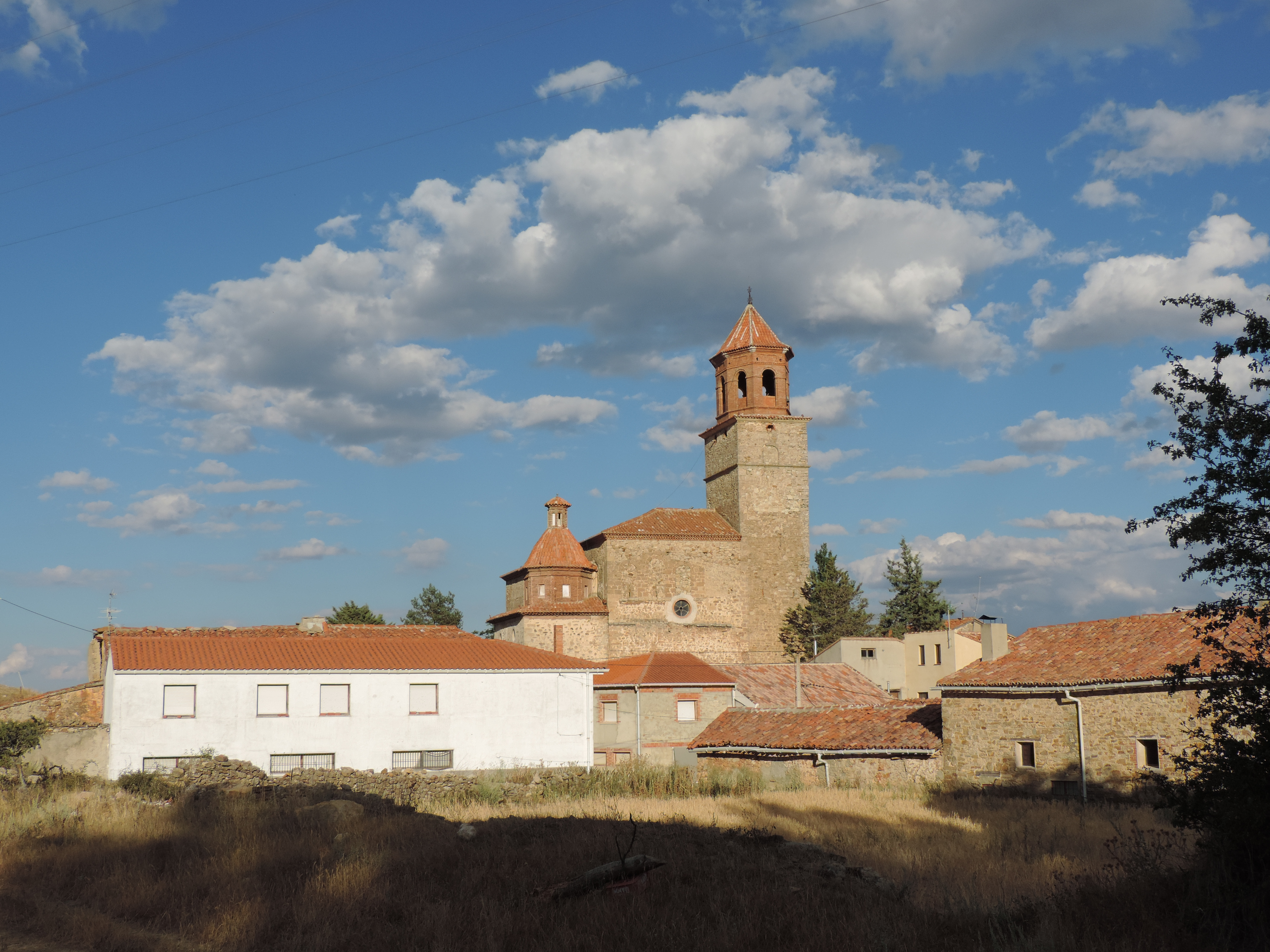

- Location within Spain
- Coordinates: 40°18′N 1°30′W
- Country: Spain
- Autonomous community: Aragon
- Province: Teruel

Area
  - Total: 47.98 km^{2} (18.53 sq mi)
- Elevation: 1,443 m (4,734 ft)

Population (2025-01-01)
  - Total: 198
  - Density: 4.13/km^{2} (10.7/sq mi)
- Time zone: UTC+1 (CET)
  - Summer (DST): UTC+2 (CEST)

Terriente is a municipality located in the province of Teruel, Aragon, Spain. According to the 2004 census (INE), the municipality had a population of 183 inhabitants.

== See also ==
- List of municipalities in Teruel
