= Barbastro =

Town in Aragon, Spain

Barbastro Balbastro
- Municipality
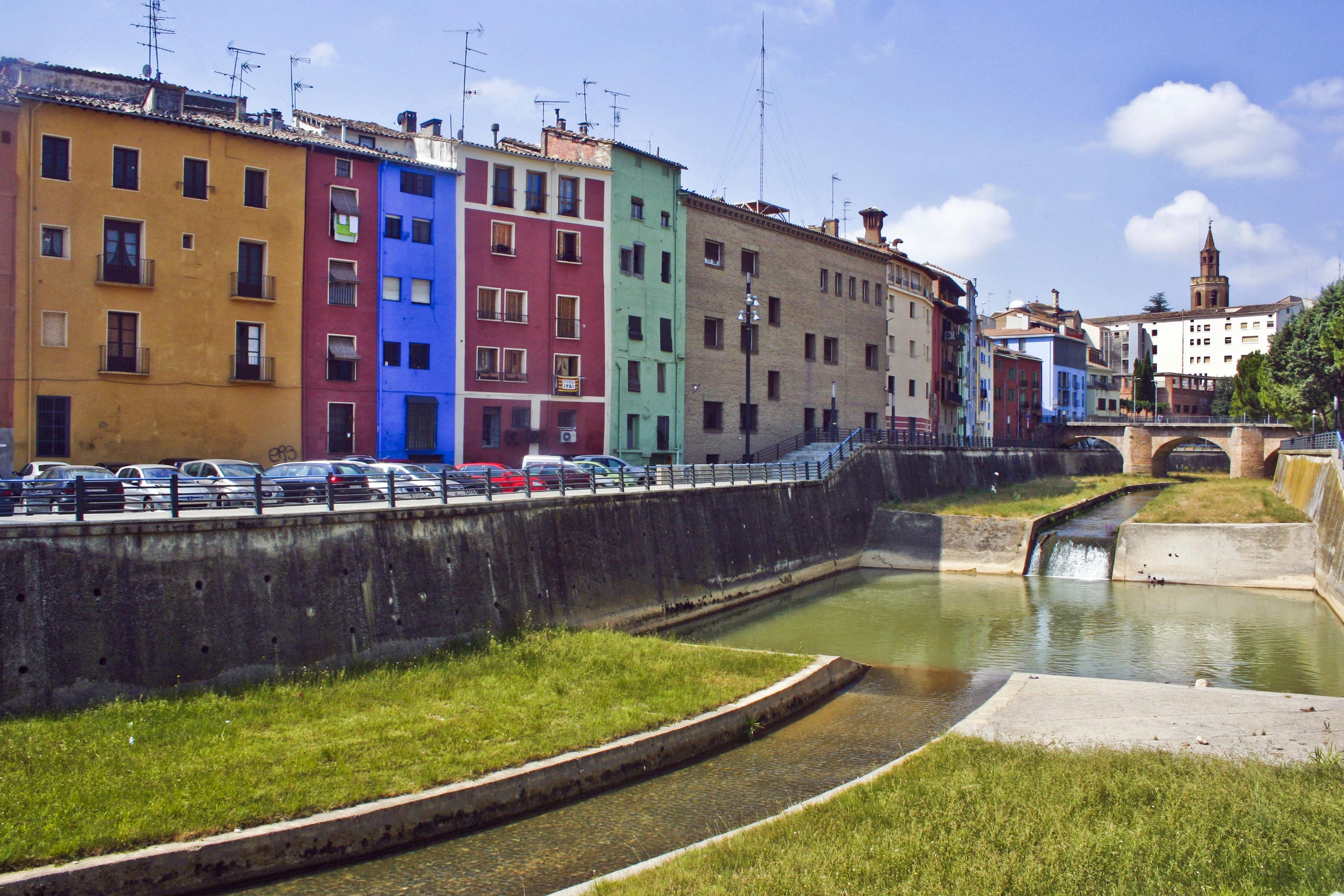

- Coat of arms

- Location in Spain
- Coordinates: 42°2′10″N 0°7′35″E
- Country: Spain
- Autonomous community: Aragon
- Province: Huesca
- Comarca: Somontano de Barbastro
- Judicial district: Barbastro

Government
  - Mayor: Fernando Torres Chavarría (PP)

Area
  - Total: 107.60 km^{2} (41.54 sq mi)
- Elevation: 341 m (1,119 ft)

Population (2025-01-01)
  - Total: 17,807
  - Density: 165.49/km^{2} (428.62/sq mi)
- Demonym: Barbastrenses
- Time zone: UTC+1 (CET)
  - Summer (DST): UTC+2 (CEST)
- Postal code: 22300
- Website: Official website

Barbastro (Latin: Barbastrum or Civitas Barbastrensis, Aragonese: Balbastro) is a city in the Somontano county, province of Huesca, Spain. The city (also known originally as Barbastra or Bergiduna) is at the junction of the rivers Cinca and Vero.

== History ==
An ancient Celtiberian city called Bergidum or Bergiduna, in Roman times Barbastro (now called Brutina) was included in the Hispania Citerior region, and later of Hispania Tarraconensis.

After the fall of the Western Roman Empire, it was part of the Visigoth kingdom. Barbastro and the Barbitaniya area were overtaken by Musa bin Nusair in 717, as part of the Umayyad push to conquer northern states of the Marca Hispanica and the name Madyar was given to the town.

It was later settled by the Banu Jalaf who made it the capital of the Emirate of Barbineta and Huesca until 862, and was known as the Emirate of Brabstra until 882.

In 1064, Sancho Ramírez, King of Aragón, and his Frankish Christian forces, led by William VIII of Aquitaine and Le Bon Normand, invaded the city, which at the time was part of the emirate of Zaragoza. This attack was known as the Siege of Barbastro. Contemporary sources state that 50,000 people were killed or captured in the attack, but modern historians view this as an exaggeration since the whole population of the town probably did not exceed 8,000. Muslim reconquest (1065)

In the Middle Ages, a Sephardic Jewish community thrived in Barbastro, suffering little compared to other Jewish populations in Spain. The first written record of a Jewish presence dates to 1144. After the Disputation of Tortosa, the Jewish community ceased to exist because they had all become conversos. The old synagogue, however, became a center for converso life.

In June 1837, during the First Carlist War, Barbastro was the site of an action where the French Foreign Legion, then attached to the liberal government's army, found itself fighting the Carlist foreign legion. The French Foreign Legion's commander, Colonel Joseph Conrad, was killed in the fighting. The future Marshal Bazaine, a close friend of Conrad's, was also present.

During the Spanish Civil War 51 Catholic Claretians, mostly young seminarians, were executed in Barbastro by anarchist militia of the Popular Front. Barbastro was the Catholic diocese which suffered the greatest percentage of clergy martyrdoms of the Civil War: in total 18 Benedictines, from a nearby monastery, 9 Piarists, who ran a local school, the 51 Claretians, 13 canons of the Cathedral, 114 diocesan priests, 5 diocesan seminarians, and the bishop were executed.

In Homage to Catalonia, George Orwell describes a stop in the town on his way back from the front:

I had a day to put in to Barbastro, for there was only one train a day. Previously I had seen Barbastro in brief glimpses, and it had seemed to me simply a part of the war — a grey, muddy, cold place, full of roaring lorries and shabby troops. It seemed queerly different now. Wandering through it I became aware of pleasant tortuous streets, old stone bridges, wine shops with great oozy barrels as tall as a man, and intriguing semi-subterranean shops where men were making cartwheels, daggers, wooden spoons, and goatskin water- bottles. [...] And at the back of the town there was a shallow jade-green river, and rising out of it a perpendicular cliff of rock, with houses built into the rock, so that from your bedroom window you could spit straight into the water a hundred feet below. Innumerable doves lived in the holes in the cliff.

Numerous socialist, republican and communist activists were jailed and executed in the following years after the end of the Spanish Civil War.

Barbastro's economy flourished until the early 20th century, when a period of decline began, ending only in the 1960s due to the growth of agricultural production.

== Notable people ==
- Bartolomé (1562–1631) and Lupercio de Argensola (1559–1613), brothers, historians and poets who were part of the Spanish siglo de oro, a period of flourishing in arts and literature in Spain.
- Saint Josemaría Escrivá (1902–1975), Spanish priest, founder of Opus Dei, an institution of the Roman Catholic Church, composed of both priests and laity, and dedicated to the principles of everyday holiness. He was canonized by Pope John Paul II in 2002.
- María Pilar Crespí Pérez, Spanish chemist by the Universidad Complutense de Madrid and teacher in the Colegio Estudio. Wife of Don Antonio Corróns Rodríguez, Ph.D., and mother of D. Pablo Antonio Corróns Crespí (AENOR) and D. Jorge Antonio Corróns Crespí (Proteyco Ibérica, S.A.).
- Antonio Ricardos (1727–1794), famous Spanish army general.
- Sara Soler (born 1992), Spanish comic book artist.

== Twin towns ==
- (France) Saint-Gaudens, Haute-Garonne

== See also ==
- Barbastro Cathedral
- Diocese of Barbastro-Monzón
- UD Barbastro – local association football club
- Un Dios Prohibido, a fim about the massacre of priests in Barbastro during the Civil War
- List of municipalities in Huesca

== Sources ==
- Bardón, Tirso López (1907). "Diocese of Barbastro" . In Herbermann, Charles (ed.). Catholic Encyclopedia. Vol. 2. New York: Robert Appleton Company.
- The Historic Atlas of Iberia
