= La Seu d'Urgell =

- Municipality
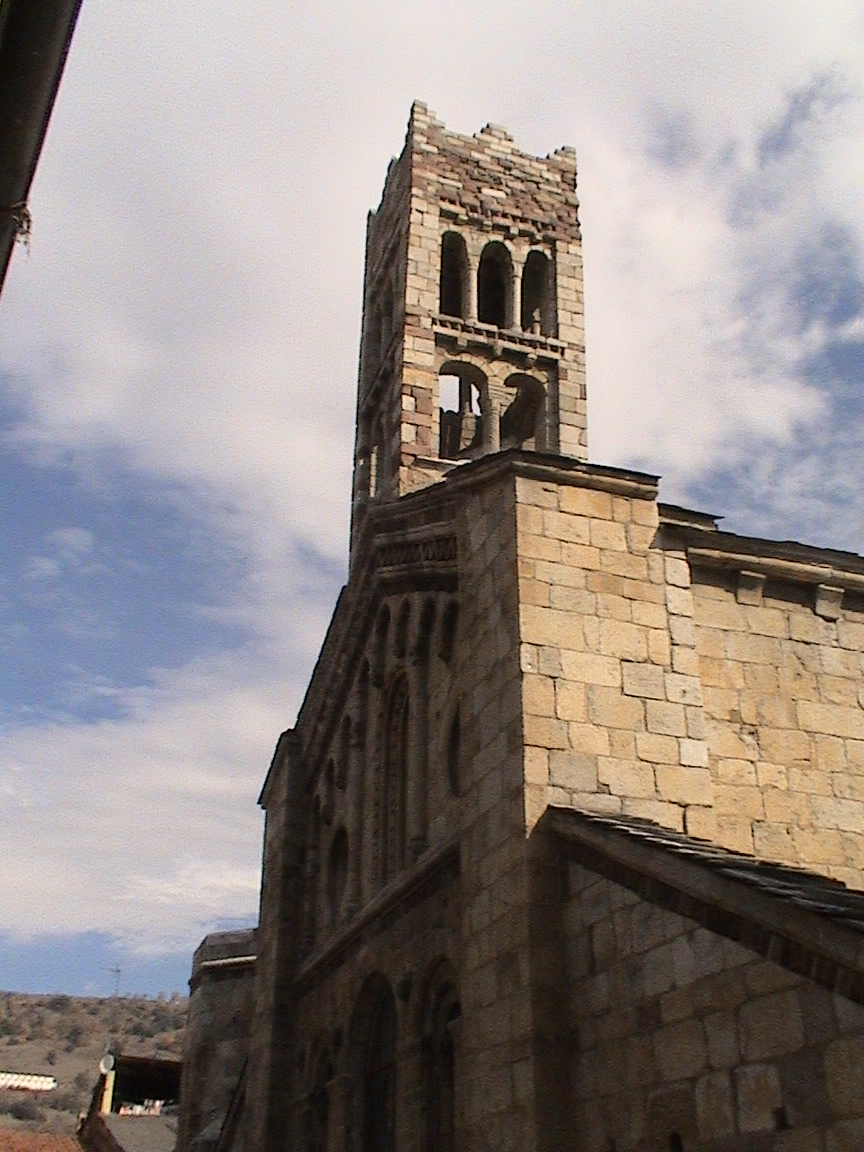
- Seu d'Urgell Cathedral

- Coat of arms

- Location in Alt Urgell county

- Location within Catalonia Location within Spain
- Coordinates: 42.358°N 1.456°E
- Sovereign state: Spain
- Community: Catalonia
- Region: Alt Pirineu
- County: Alt Urgell
- Province: Lleida

Government
  - Mayor: Joan Barrera i Aranda (2023) (PSC)

Area
  - Total: 15.4 km^{2} (5.9 sq mi)
- Elevation: 691 m (2,267 ft)

Population (2025-01-01)
  - Total: 13,009
  - Density: 845/km^{2} (2,190/sq mi)
- Demonyms: Urgellenc, urgellenca or Urgellès, urgellesa
- Climate: Cfb
- Website: www.laseu.cat

La Seu d'Urgell (Catalan: [la ˈsɛw ðuɾˈdʒeʎ]; Spanish: Seo de Urgel [seo ðe uɾˈxel], formerly Urgell) is a town located in Alt Urgell county in Alt Pirineu, Catalonia, Spain. The town is also the head of its judicial district and the seat of the Bishop of Urgell, one of the co-princes of Andorra. It is the most populated town of the region, with 17.4% of its population. La Seu d'Urgell and Puigcerdà together have 30% of the population of the area. It has a population of 13,009 (register office, 2025).

It is located at the confluence of the Segre and the Valira rivers. The city is in the local region of Urgellet, a Pyrenean region formed by 16 municipalities of Alt Urgell. Urgellet and Andorra were originally the County of Urgell with its capital in la Seu d'Urgell before the county expansion to the south.

Alt Urgell is the gateway to the state of Andorra and the proximity to this important population center and economic activity is one of the main reasons for the current vigour of the city of la Seu d'Urgell within Alt Pirineu.

The town's patron saints are Saint Ot of Urgell, Saint Sebastian, and the Virgin of Urgell. While the Virgin of Núria and Sant Ermengol are the main patrons of the diocese of Urgell, Sant Ermengol is the most prominent in the city than other patrons. Probably that is why there are various events throughout the year dedicated to Sant Ermengol, such as the Sant Ermengol Fair, one of the oldest in Catalonia, and the altarpiece of Sant Ermengol.

The Segre Olympic Park, built in 1992 for the Barcelona Summer Olympic Games, is a pump-driven canoe and kayak sports venue located adjacent to the historical centre of la Seu d'Urgell.

== Name origins ==
The name la Seu d'Urgell, in Latin Sedes Urgelli, is formed by two different words: Seu from the Latin "Sedes", or seat, and Urgell a pre-Roman name. Catalan linguist Joan Coromines interpreted that the name is related to the presence of water.

The Iberian settlement of Arse-durgui (or Arse d'Urgui) was on the hill of Castellciutat. At that time the hill was called Puiolo Urgelli. Where there was the village of Arse-durgui they built the city of Urgell (in Latin civitas Orgellia and in Catalan ciutat d'Urgell) and here lies the origin of the name Castellciutat. Until the eighteenth century the town was known simply as "Ciutat" (City in English) and Castell (Castle) was added because the existence of an ancient castle that was home of the Counts of Urgell.

Shortly after the destruction of the former Orgellia new neighborhood arose, which became the new home of the Diocese of Urgell. Its name vicus Sedes Urgelli indicates that the town is the episcopal see of the Bishop of Urgell.

Over time, Sedes Urgelli took importance and lost the word vicus (denotes that it was a district) while civitas Orgellia lost the word Orgellia and becomes simply Civitas until the 18th century.

== Location ==
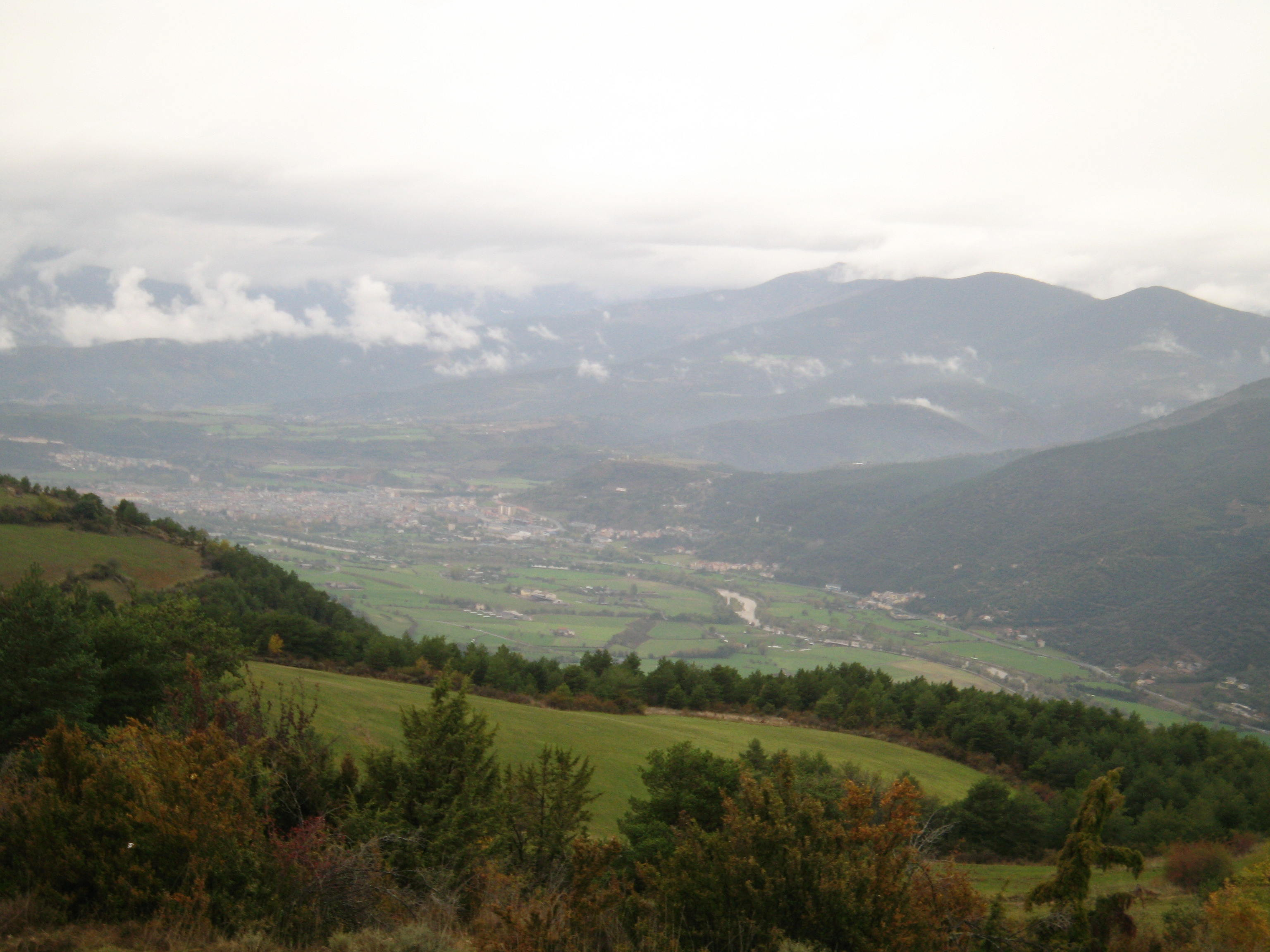
Overview from Vilanova de Banat, showing the plana de la Seu, pla de les Forques, Castellciutat and other neighborhoods.

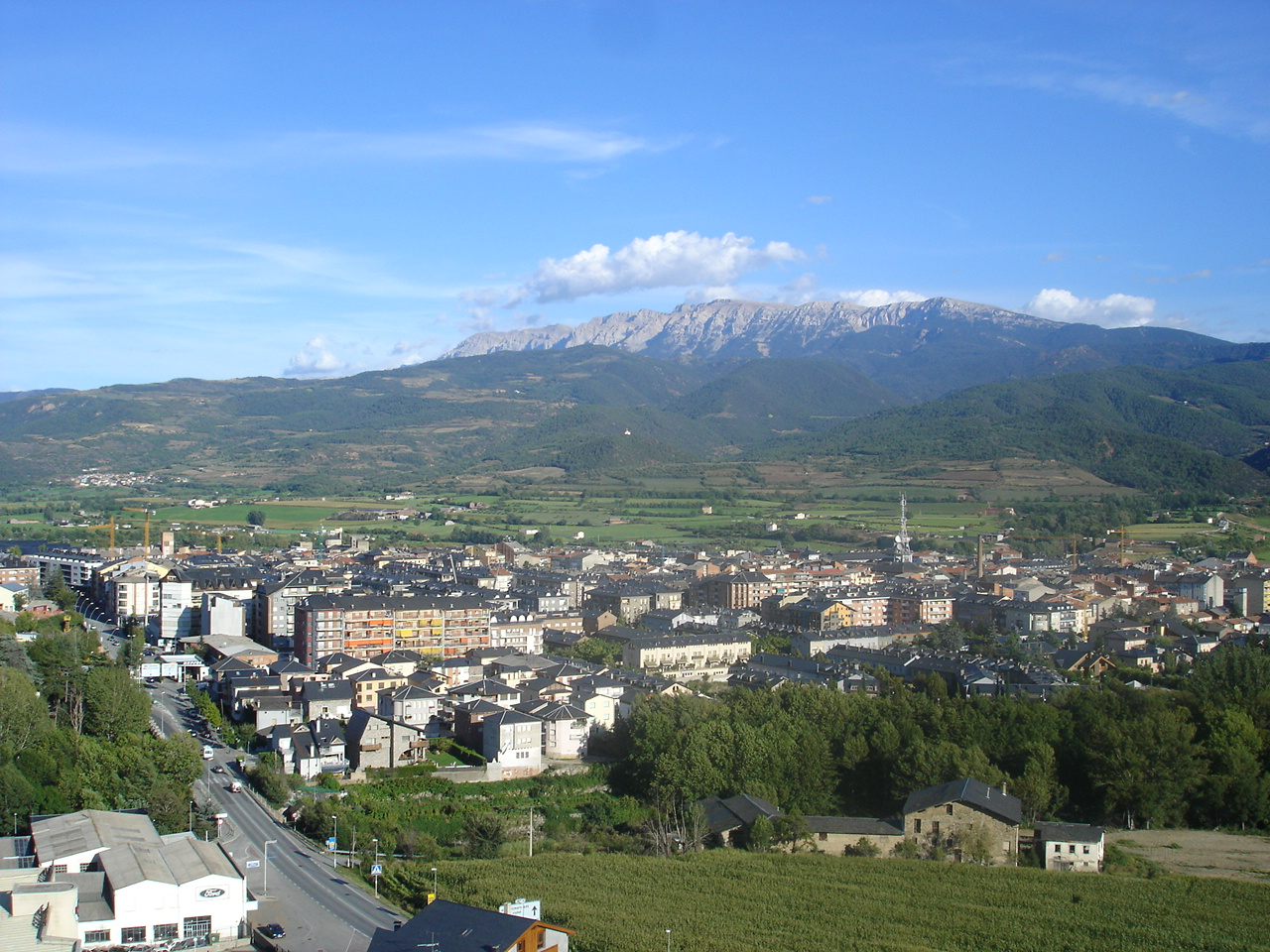
View of La Seu d'Urgell from the Tower of Solsona.

The city is at the confluence of two rivers, the Segre and Gran Valira, located in a plain 7 km long and 691 meters high surrounded by high mountains, such as the Cadí mountain range. The plain is called plana de la Seu and was formed by the Segre river.

Because it is located at one of the major crossroads of communication in the Catalan Pyrenees, la Seu d'Urgell has had a unique and historic role in the county of Urgell. The roads to Andorra, Cerdanya and the low Segre all converge on la Seu d'Urgell.

Parallel to the Valira river rises a mountain range, where stand the remains of two great fortresses, the Ciutadella and Ciutat Castle (in Castellciutat), both of historic importance in the town. Small banks or open plains around the Segre are separated by gorges.

In the north, La Seu d'Urgell has borders with the municipality of les Valls de Valira, to the west with Montferrer i Castellbò where there is La Seu d'Urgell Airport (also known as Andorra-Pirineus airport), to the south-west with Ribera d'Urgellet, to the south-east with Alàs i Cerc, and to the north-east with Estamariu.

The municipality includes a small exclave to the east.

== La Seu d'Urgell municipality ==
Map of the municipality of la Seu d'Urgell.

- Bell-lloc.
- Castellciutat (a village).
- Les Torres.
- La Seu d'Urgell districts:
  - Sant Antoni.
  - Sant Pere.
  - Poble-sec.
  - La Seu d'Urgell:
    - Santa Magdalena.
    - Serrat de la Capella.
    - Eixample Bergós (non-official).
    - Casc antic (Town center historic district in English) (non-official).

=== Fairs, festivals and markets ===
Despite the low population density of Alt Pirineu i Aran, the area hosts 6.6% of the exhibitions and other civic activities in Catalonia. In la Seu d'Urgell, there are numerous fairs and markets throughout the year:

- Traditional market takes place every Tuesday and Saturday in the Main Street.
- Fira de Sant Ermengol, documented as the oldest of Spain, held on the third weekend of October.
- Fira de Formatges Artesans del Pirineu (cheese fair of Pyrenean artisans).
- Spring Fair held in April and includes an exhibition of the best examples of Vaca bruna dels Pirineus, a cow from Pyrenees.
- Fira d'Art, an art exhibition, held since 2007.
- Mercat Medieval dels Canonges: a festival of street music, theater, circus, falconery and old offices.
- Mercat de les Opportunitats is held twice a year.
- International Music Festival Joan Brudieu began in 1969 and is held in July and August.

== Attractions ==
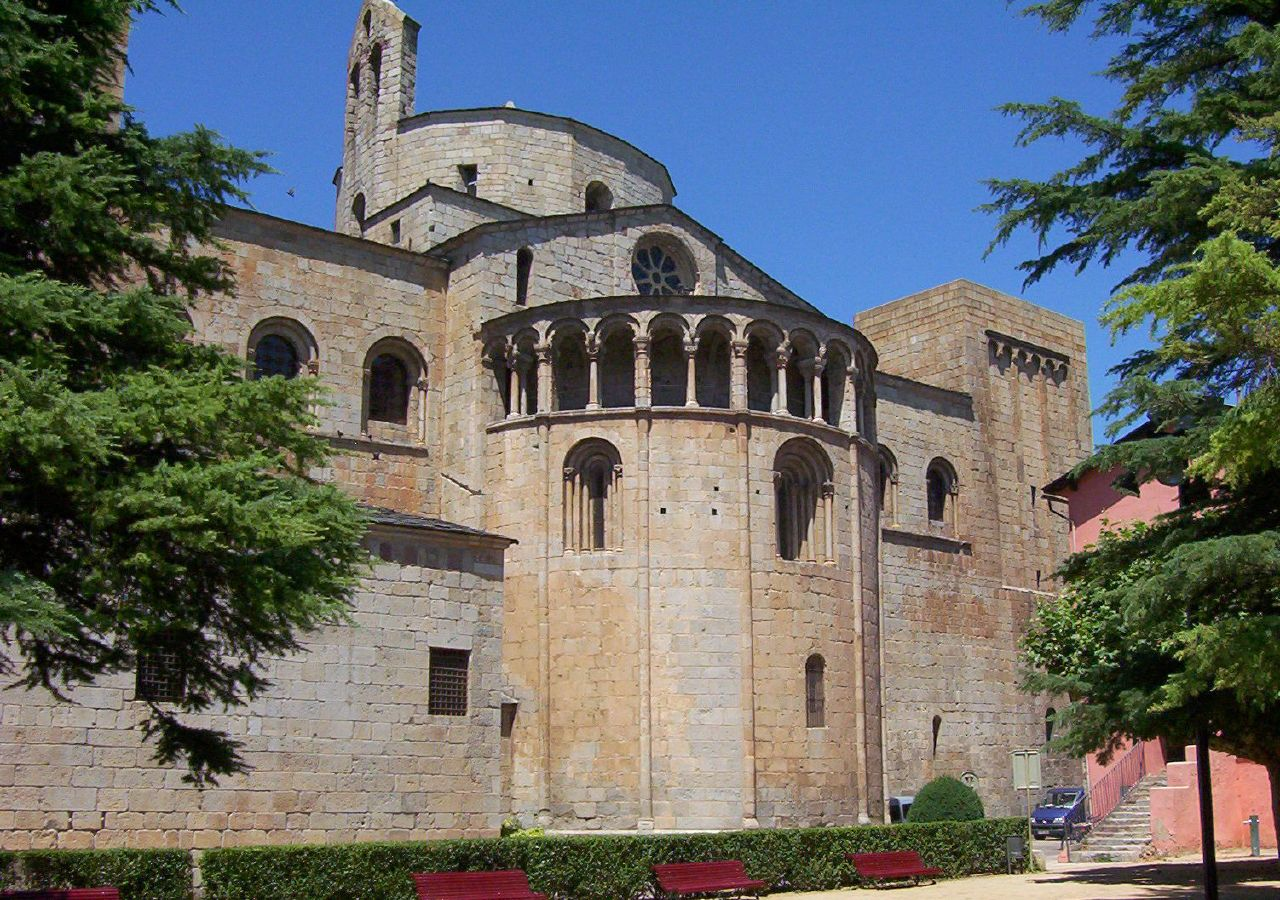
Cathedral of la Seu d'Urgell

- Church monuments:
  - Santa Maria d'Urgell, cathedral of la Seu d'Urgell, in the square of Oms.
  - Cloisters of the cathedral of Urgell.
  - Diocese of Urgell Museum. It houses the Urgell Beatus illuminated manuscript.
  - Palau Episcopal de la Seu d'Urgell (Episcopal Palace), the palace courtyard.
  - Library of Sant Agustí, current municipal library where there was the old convent of Sant Agustí.
  - Church of Sant Miquel along the cloister of Santa Maria d'Urgell is the only building that remains of the cathedral complex built by Sant Ermengol that dates from the year 1035.
  - Old Church of Santa Immaculada and future conference room.
  - Old Church of Sant Domènec, a Gothic building. It is used for conferences and exhibitions.
  - Church of Santa Magdalena, the most important church from the social point of view.
  - Seminari conciliar. To the north of the city, it is surrounded by a large courtyard building with a monumental facade featuring a neo-Romanesque design. Built in 1860 by Roman Samson.

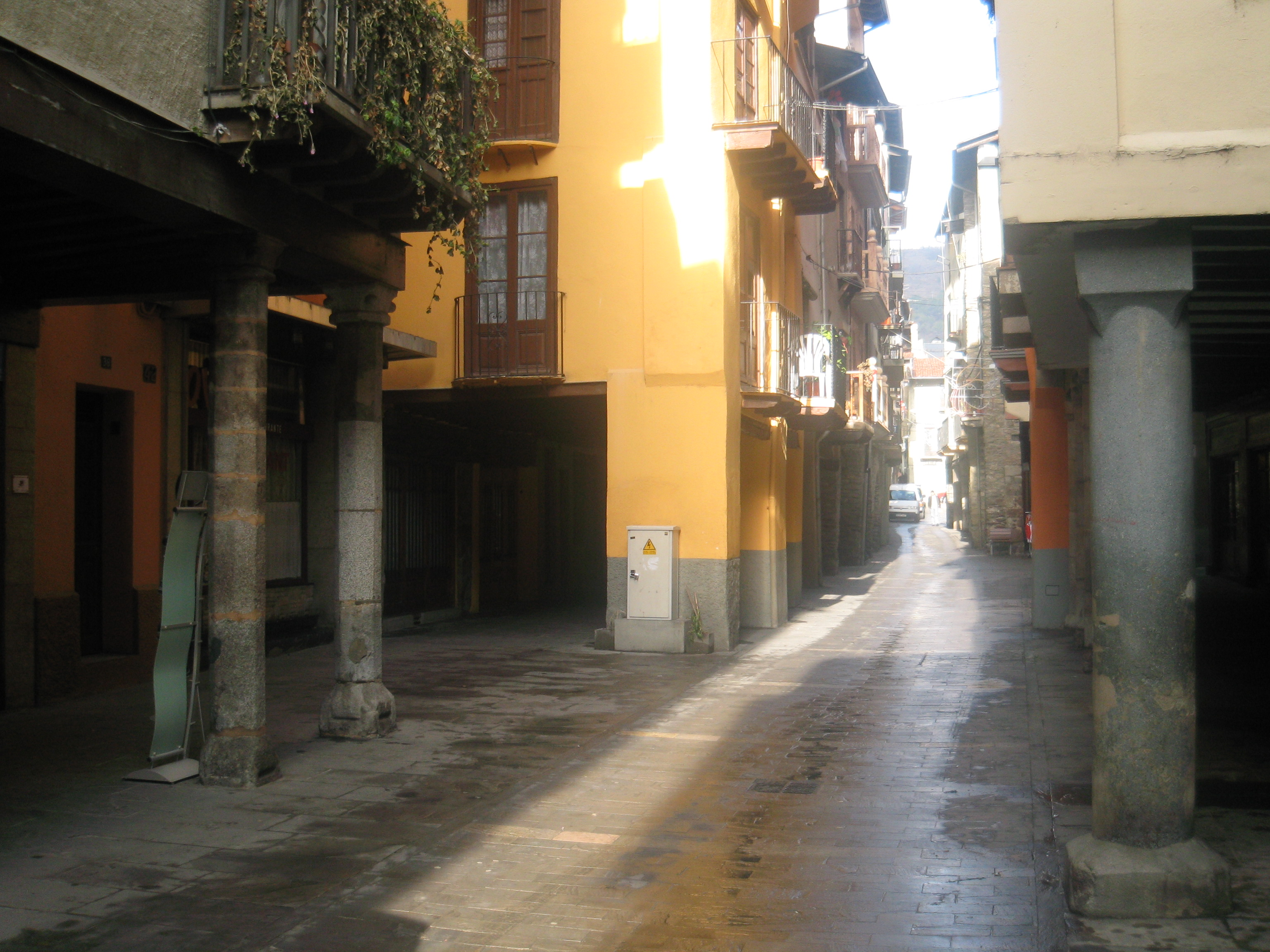
Canonges street.

- Old Town, or historic center, where there are Canonges street and the Main Street, both of high architectural value, in addition to the courtyard of the Palau and square Oms where there are the City Hall. The Passeig de Joan Brudieu, the center of la Seu d'Urgell, is one of the most important streets and divides the old town and the new one.
- Castellciutat village, has panoramic views over the Tower of Solsona, the castel and Ciutadella.
- Educational Centers
  - Cultural Center "Les Monges" (The Nuns), there are the schools of dance, music and plastic arts in addition to municipal child care, a center of UNED.
  - IES Joan Brudieu: Institute for secondary education, high school.
- Cadí-Moixeró Natural Park

== Sport ==
At its artificial whitewater course, Parc Olímpic del Segre, the town hosted the canoe slalom events for the 1992 Summer Olympics in neighboring Barcelona. It hosted the ICF Canoe Slalom World Championships in 1999, 2009 and again in 2019.

== Demography ==
1900	1930	1950	1970	1986	2019
3520	4584	7062	9404	n/a	12089

Incorporation of the municipality of les Torres (1857), Castellciutat (1975).

== Highest summits ==
- Pic de Salòria 2.789 m.
- Monturull 2.761 m.
- Torreta de Cadí 2.562 m.
- Cap del Verd in Alt Urgell and Solsonès 2.282 m.
- El Coscollet 1.610 m.

== Notable people ==
The writer Teresa Colom i Pich was born here in 1973.
