= Coll de Nargó =

- Municipality
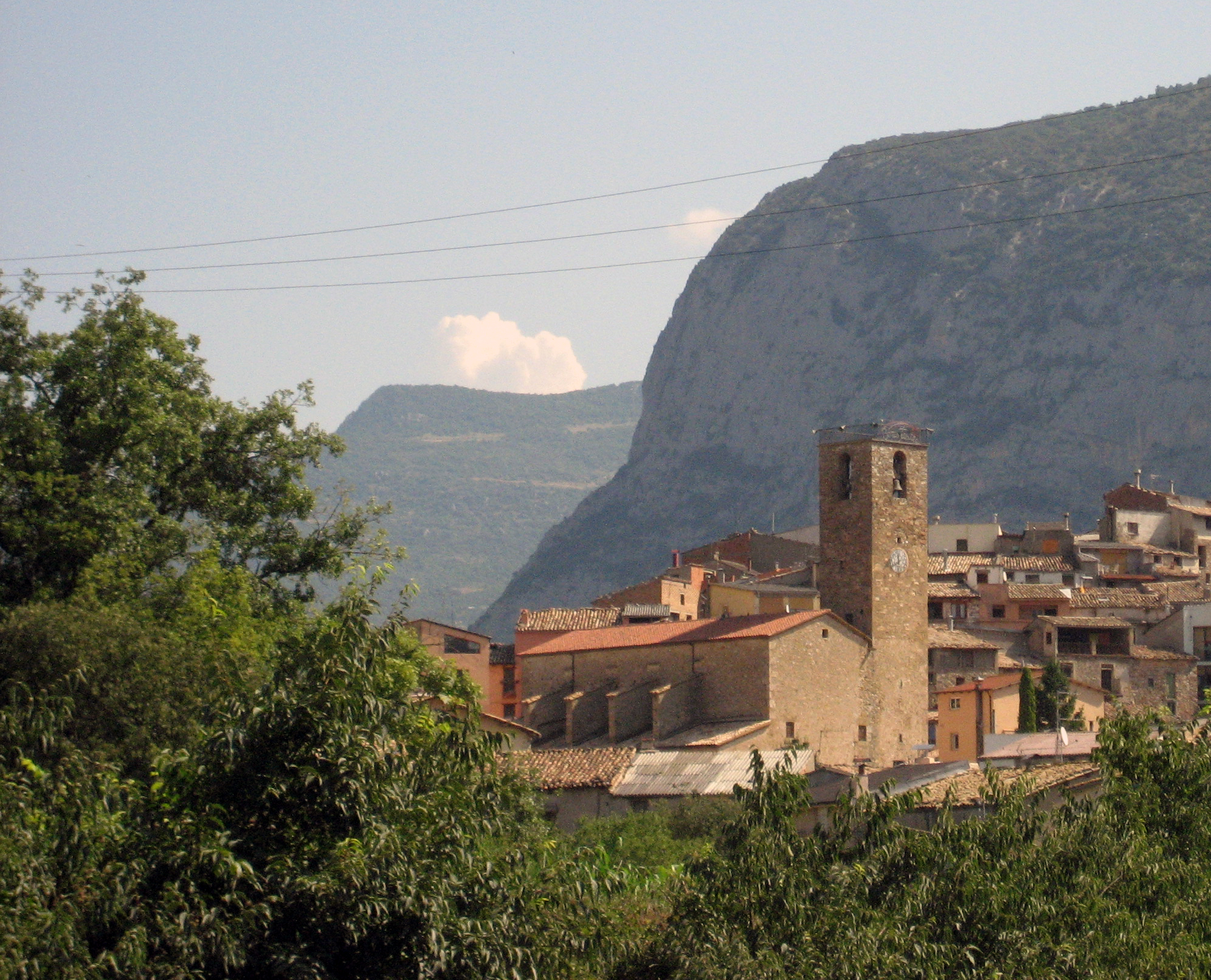
- Coll de Nargó village

- Coat of arms

- Location in Catalonia
- Coordinates: 42°10′24″N 1°19′0″E
- Country: Spain
- Community: Catalonia
- Province: Lleida
- Comarca: Alt Urgell

Government
  - Mayor: Martí Riera Rovira (2015)

Area
  - Total: 151.4 km^{2} (58.5 sq mi)
- Elevation: 753 m (2,470 ft)

Population (2025-01-01)
  - Total: 585
  - Density: 3.86/km^{2} (10.0/sq mi)
- Website: collnargo.ddl.net

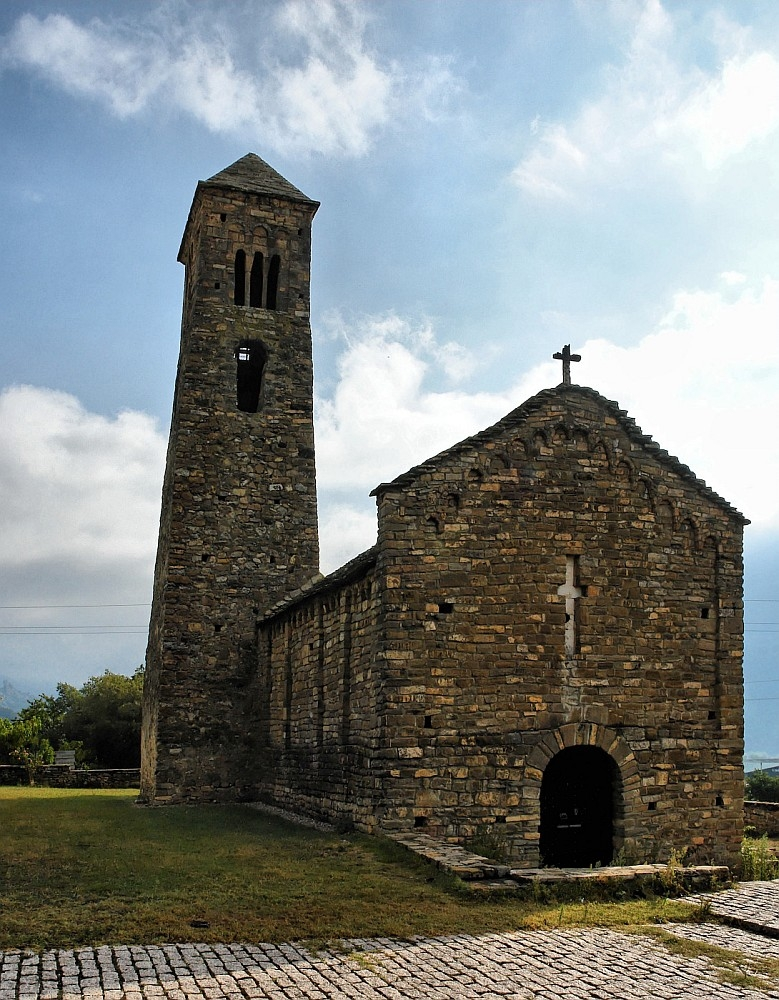
Romanesque church of Sant Climent, with its pre-Romanesque bell-tower

Coll de Nargó (Catalan pronunciation: [ˈkɔʎ ðe naɾˈɣo]) is a municipality in the comarca of the Alt Urgell in Catalonia, a region of Spain. It is situated in the Segre valley by the Oliana reservoir. The municipality is served by the C-14 road between Ponts and La Seu d'Urgell, the L-511 road to Isona and the L-401 road to Sant Llorenç de Morunys. The Romanesque church of Sant Climent dates from the eleventh century, and has a rectangular pre-Romanesque bell-tower. It has a population of 585 (register office, 2025).

== Demographics ==
| 1900 | 1930 | 1950 | 1970 | 1986 | 2005 |
|---|---|---|---|---|---|
| 1389 | 1565 | 1511 | 847 | 684 | 600 |

== Subdivisions ==
The municipality of Coll de Nargó includes five outlying villages. Populations are given as of 2001, when the population of the village of Coll de Nargó was 463:

- Gavarra (26), bordering the comarca of the Noguera
- Les Masies de Nargó (30)
- Montanissell (28), at the foot of the Sant Joan range
- Sallent (38), on the south side of the Sant Joan range, linked with Montanissell by a forest track
- Valldarques (15)
