= Sallent, Coll de Nargó =

Sallent
- Locality
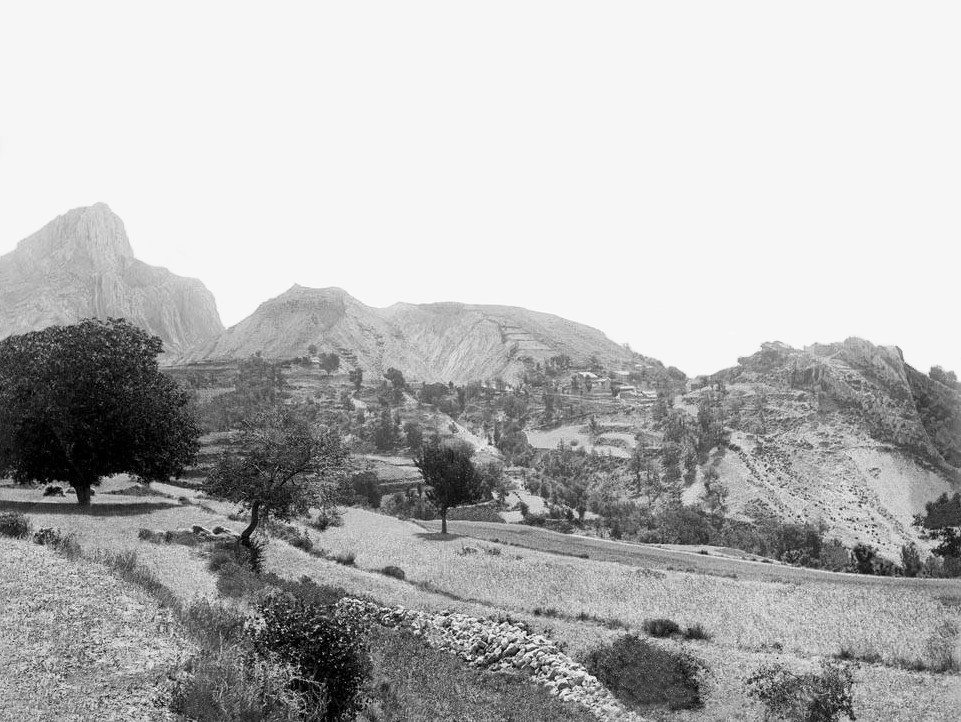

- Location within Province of Lleida Location within Catalonia Location within Spain
- Coordinates: 42°10′43″N 1°13′42″E
- Country: Spain
- Community: Catalonia
- Province: Lleida
- Municipality: Coll de Nargó
- Elevation: 1,003 m (3,291 ft)

Population
  - Total: 36

Sallent, also Sallent de Nargó, Sallent de Organyà or Sellent, is a hamlet located in the municipality of Coll de Nargó, in the comarque of Alt Urgell in the Province of Lleida, Catalonia, Spain. As of 2020, it has a population of 36.

== Geography ==
Sallent is located 120 km northeast of Lleida on the river Sallent and on the western slopes of the Serra San Joan, at an altitude of 1,003 metres.

== History ==
Sallent is recorded in the deed of consecration of Urgell Cathedral, an important document in the history of the Catalan language containing the early forms of many Catalan placenames, but although it purports to originate in 819 (or possibly 839), the dates have been called into question, as it seems that the deed may have been altered in the early 11th century. Leaving this aside, the earliest dateable reference to Sallent is in the deed of gift of the towns of Sallent, Arcavell and Lart (Ars), both in Les Valls de Valira, by Count Ermengol to La Seu d'Urgell Cathedral in 997. Having belonged to the cathedral for centuries it became part of the former municipality of Montanissell until 1969, when Montanissell became part of Coll de Nargó.

== Description ==
Sallent, although now severely depopulated, is an ancient parish, and the present parish church, dedicated to Sant Salvador, is of similarly ancient construction, possibly Romanesque, although later alterations prevent exact dating.

Sallent also contains the church of Sant Maximí, otherwise Sant Andreu, recorded in 1036, although the present structure is 12th-century. This was the original parish church, documented in 1279 and 1280 as Sant Andreu, but also known as Sant Maximí because it possessed an image of the latter saint. The church appears as subordinate to Montanissell in 1597. In 1904 Sant Salvador became the parish church.

== Gallery ==
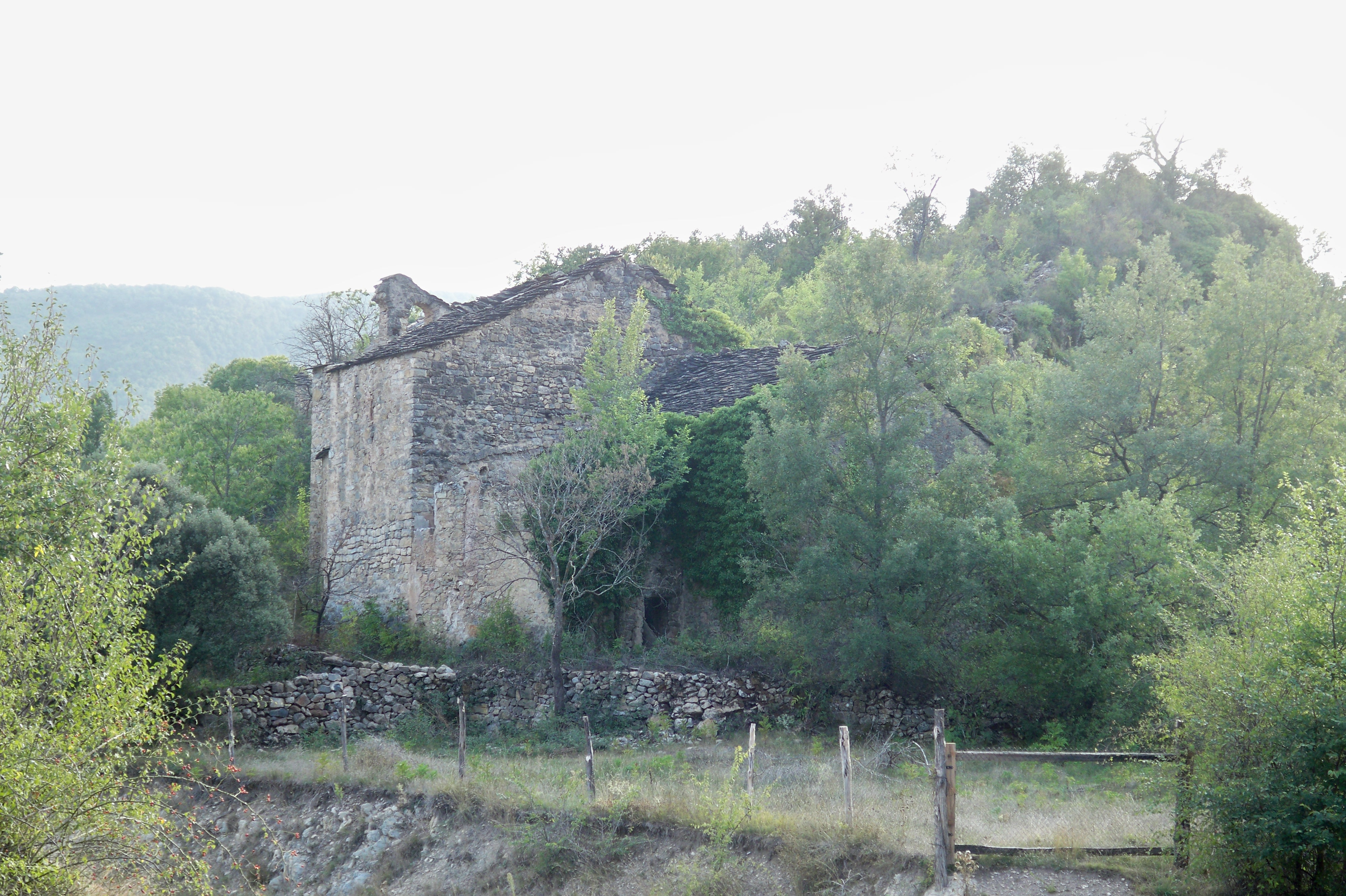
Church of Sant Salvador

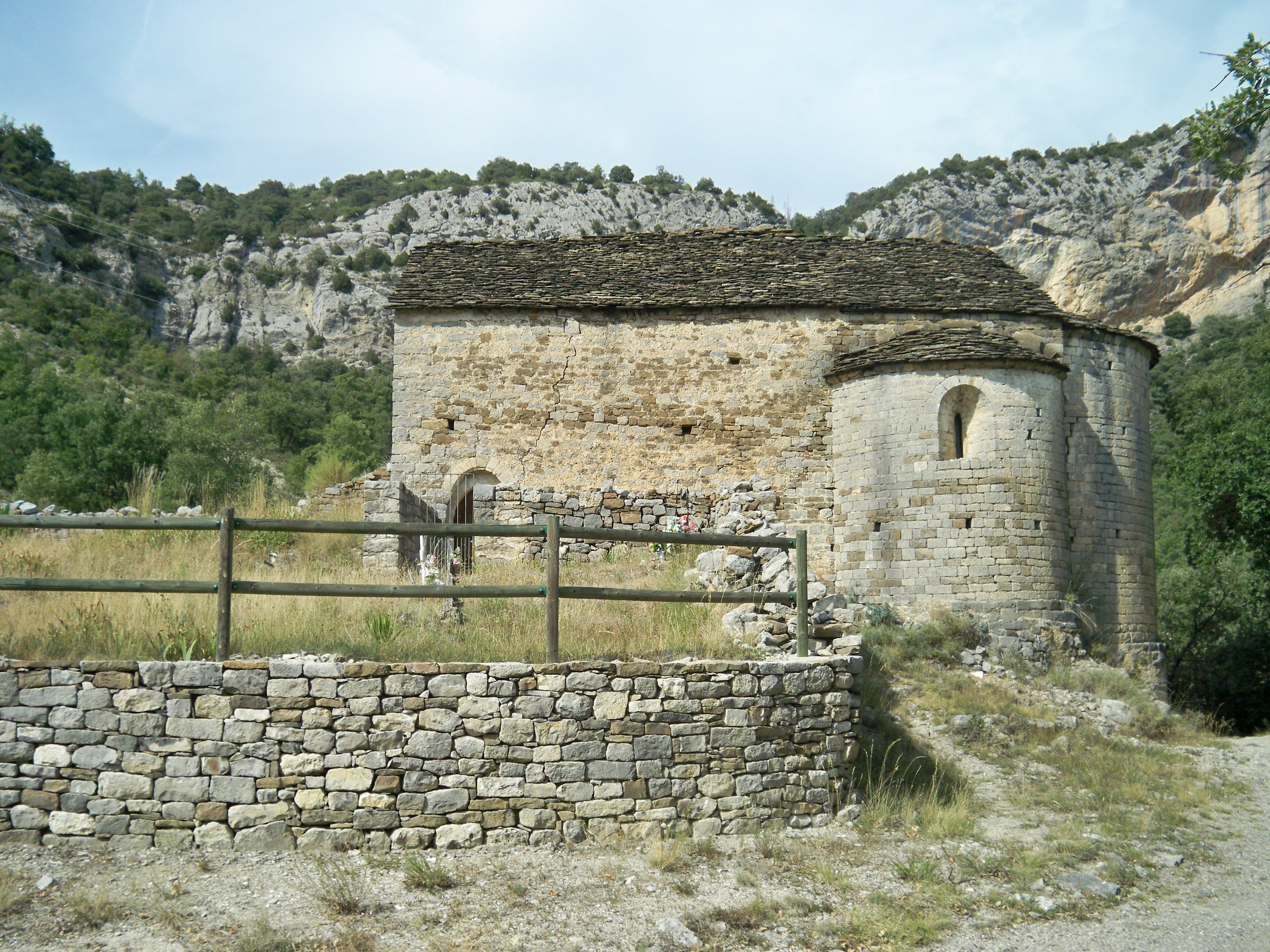
Church of Sant Maximí seen from the south

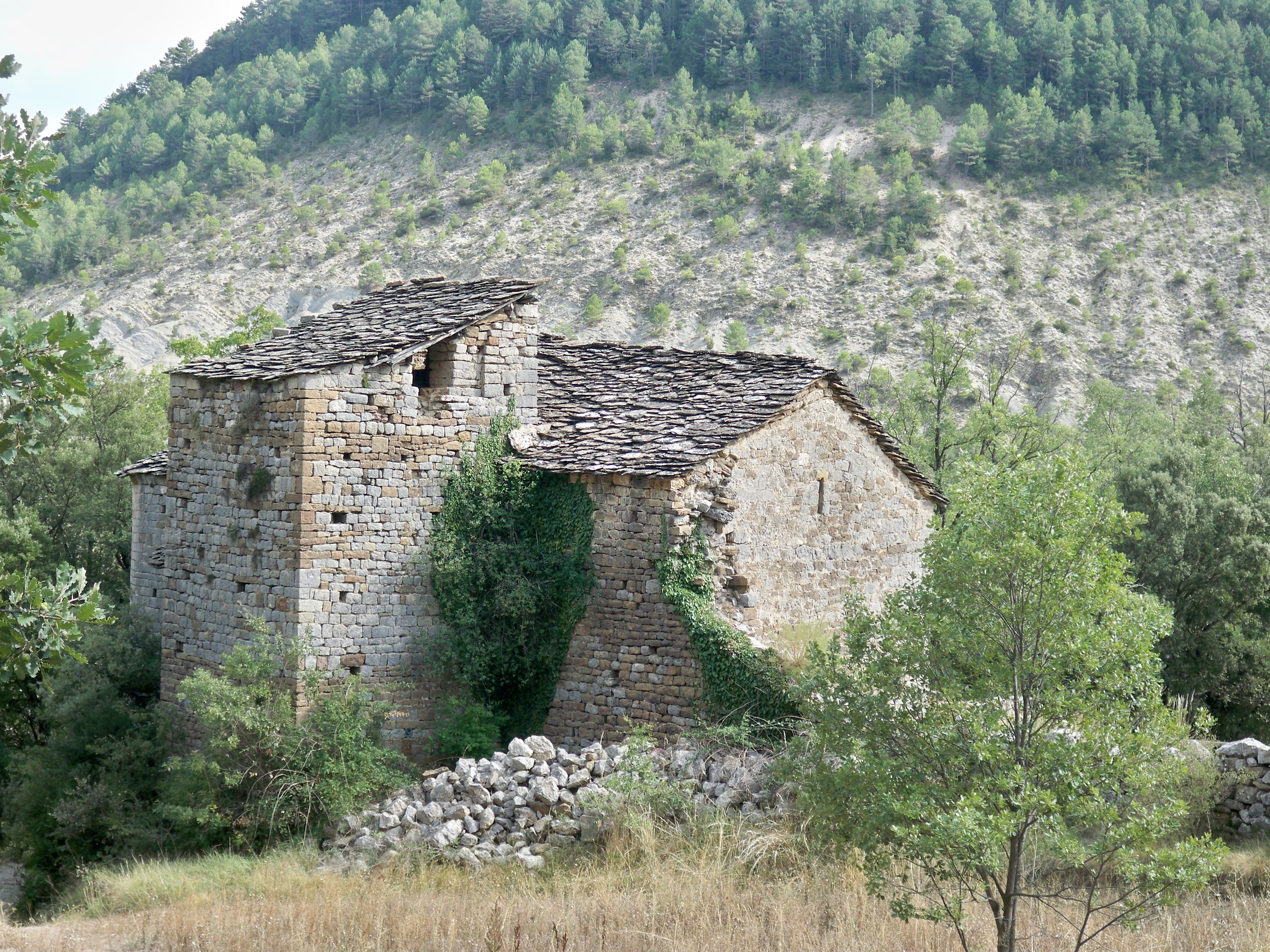
Church of Sant Maximí seen from the north and west gallery
