= Long distance observations =

Observation of distant objects on Earth's surface or terrestrial features

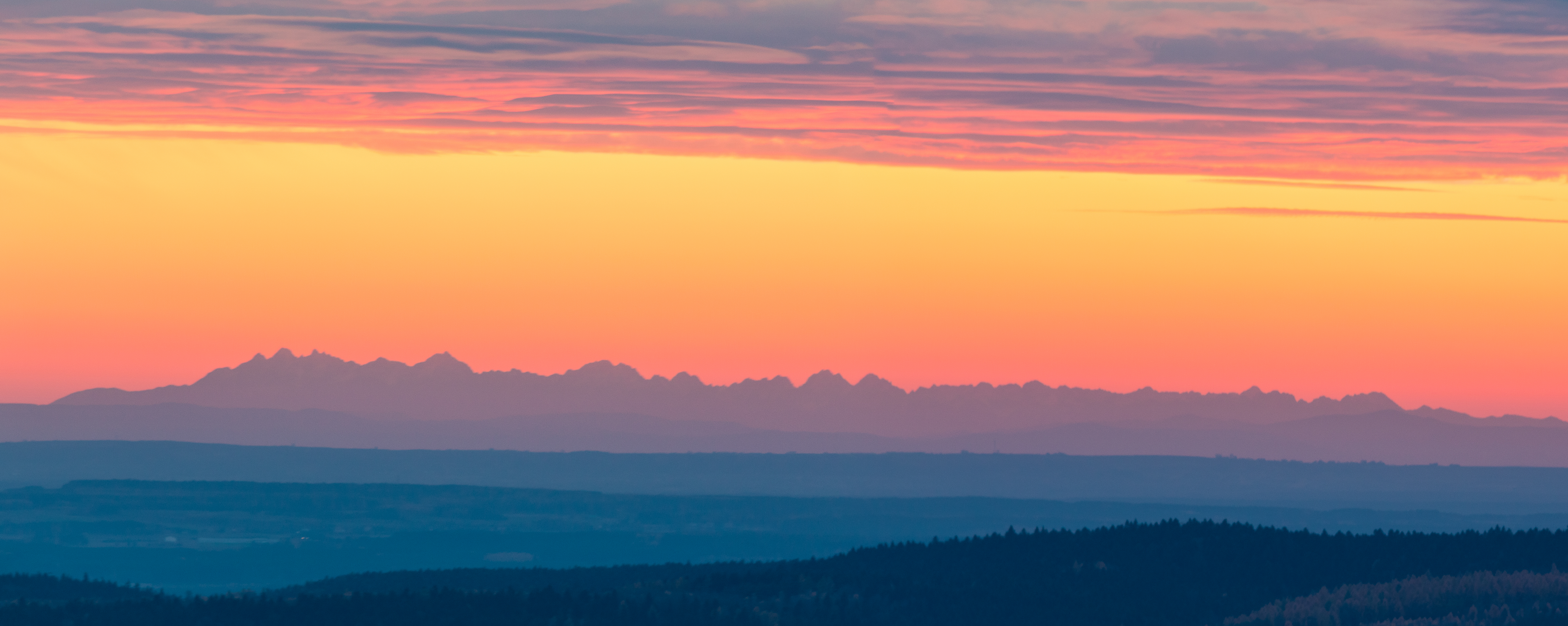
A typical example of long-distance observation. The Tatra Mountains as seen from the Łysa Góra, in southeast Poland, at a distance of about 200 km (120 mi).

Long-distance observation is any visual observation, for sightseeing or photography, that targets any object visible from a great distance, with the possibility of seeing them closely. Such observations exclude the following:

- Aircraft spotting, as it refers mostly to aircraft observed in the vicinity of the airport only.
- Satellite watching, which is the subject of astrophotography.
- Astronomical objects, since they are always far away from the observer. They are usually the subject of observational astronomy and astrophotography.

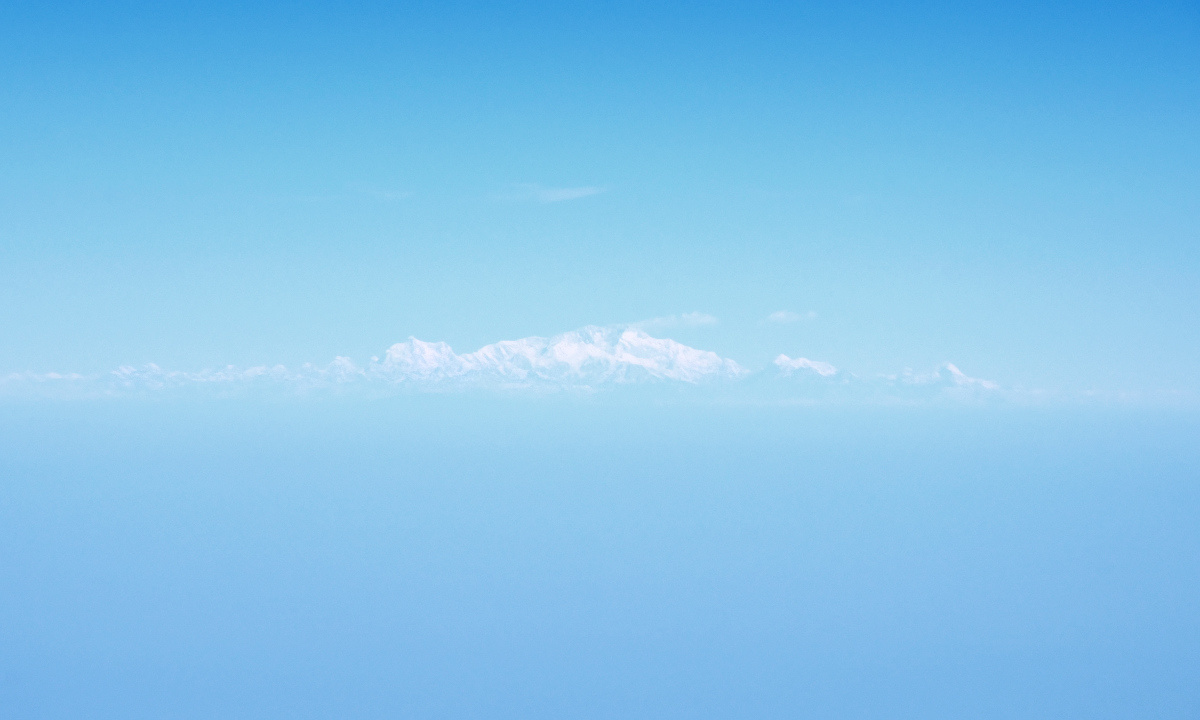
An example of long-distance aerial observation. Kangchenjunga seen from above Kolkata at a distance of 522 km (324 mi).

== Types of long distance observations ==
Concerning the position of an observer and observed distant object, we can divide long-distance observations by the following types:

- Ground-to-ground
- Ground-to-air
- Aerial

The primary criterion is the integration of an observer with the Earth's surface or the object, which is firmly integrated with the ground.

=== Ground-to-ground ===
The ground-based long-distance observations cover the Earth's landscape and natural surface features (e.g. mountains, depressions, rock formations, vegetation), as well as manmade structures firmly associated with the Earth's surface (e.g. buildings, bridges, roads) that are located farther than the usual naked-eye distance from an observer. These objects may be natural or artificial.
The natural are:

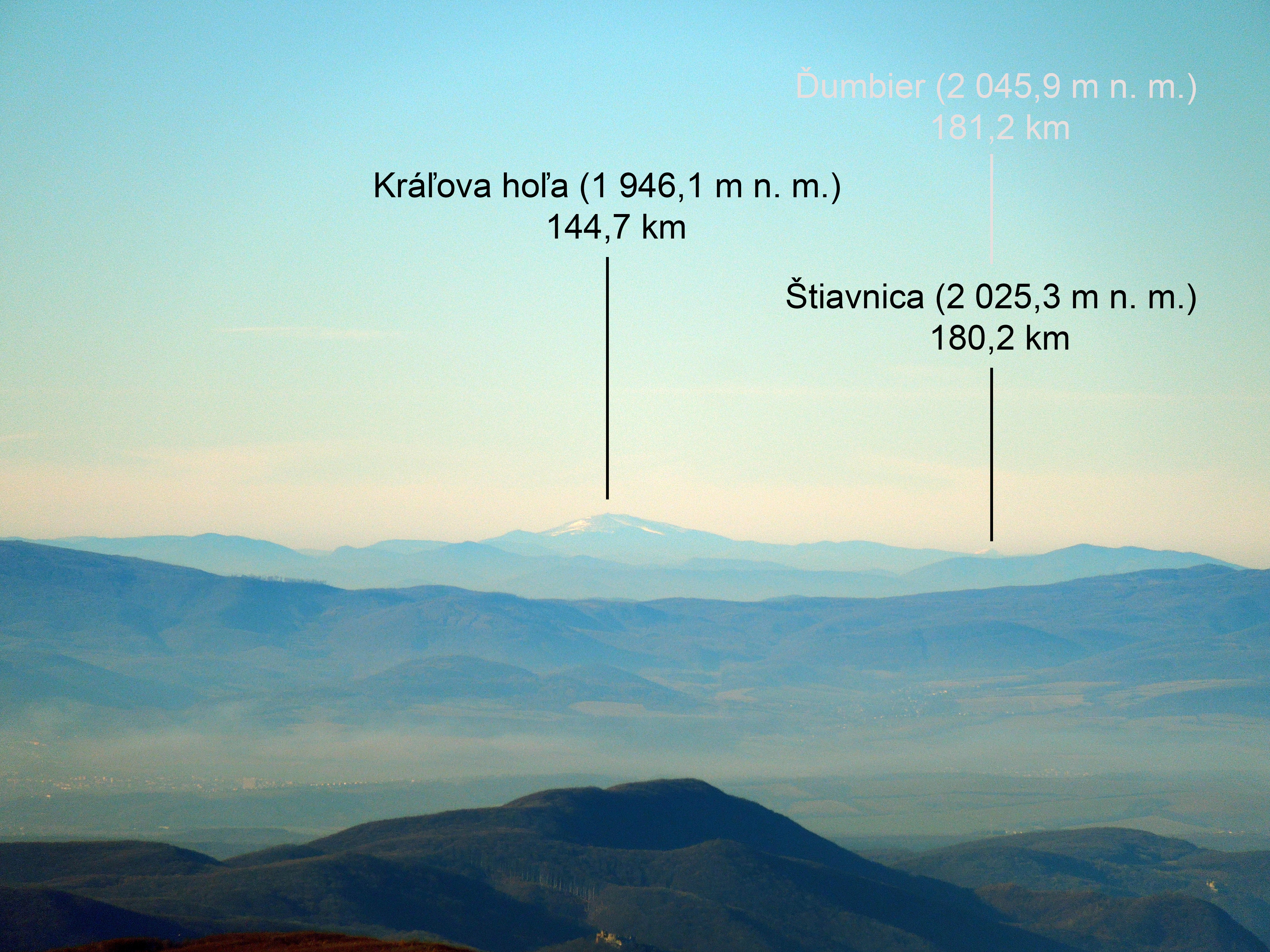
View towards Low Tatras located about 140–180 km away from the observation place (Vihorlat Mountains in Slovakia)

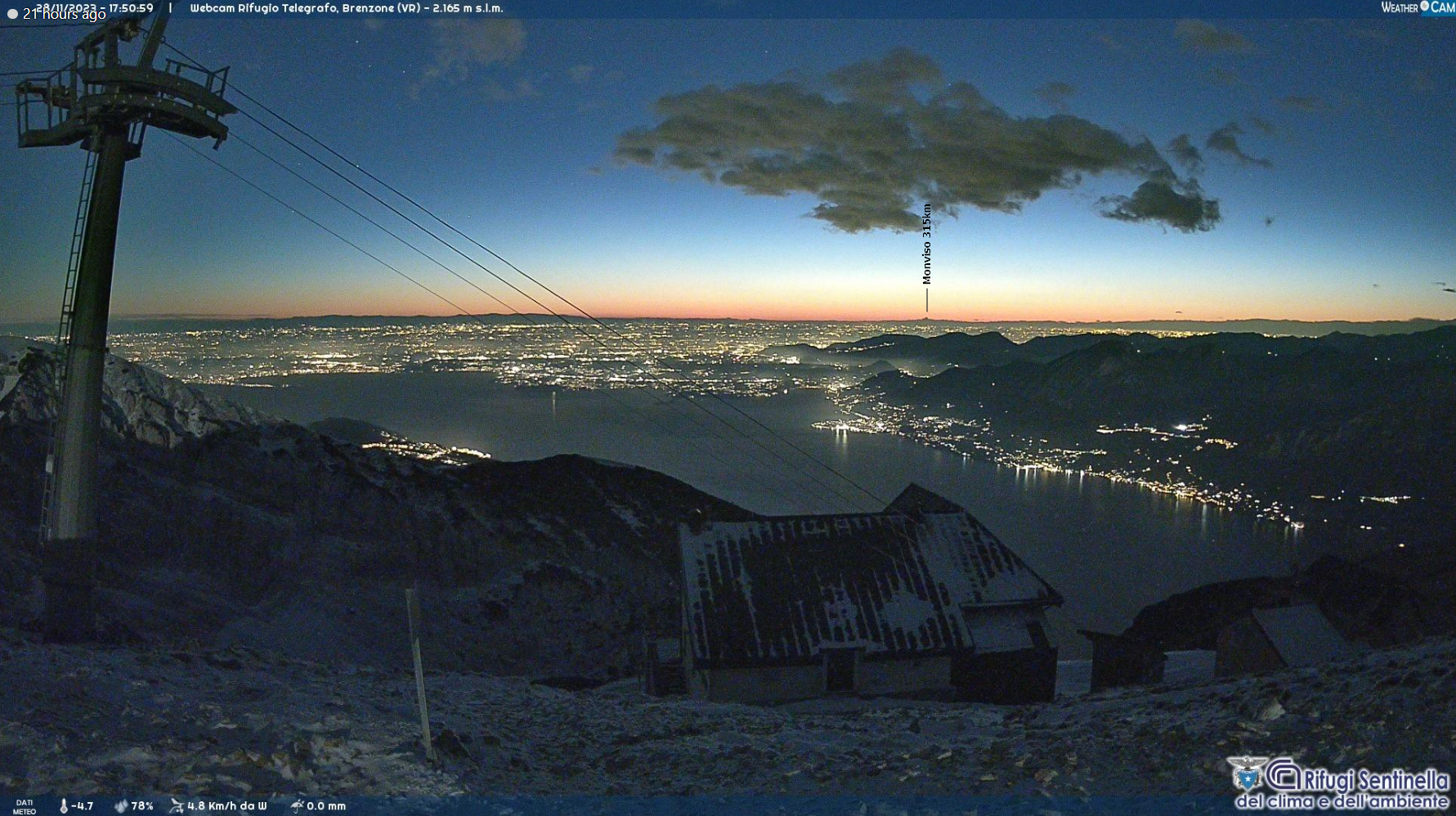
Monte Viso visible at a distance of 315km

- Mountain ranges, peaks, and hills
- Rock protrusions
- Others (e.g. high trees or forests covering the mountain)

The artificial ones are:

- Created by terrain transformation (e.g. reservoirs, dumps, dumping grounds, opencast mines)
- Construction- and telecommunication-related (e.g. telecom transmitters, TV towers, chimney power plants, bridges, high-rise buildings

=== Ground to air ===
The observer situated on the ground is able to observe some distant objects visible within the lower atmosphere, which can be i.e. distant plane passing just above the local horizon.

=== Aerial ===
This type of long-distance observation refers to a situation, where an observer or photography device isn't integrated with the ground at the moment of observation. In this case, the observation can be made from:

- an aircraft, balloon, drone

The aerial observations can also include other objects, which are already in the Earth's atmosphere.

== Main aspects of long distance observations ==
=== Topographic ===
- Object size and feature
- Object location
- The topography along the line of sight

==== Object size and feature ====
The objects, whose appearance is different from others are recognizable and detectable easier. It refers to these mountains, where some rock protrusions stand on the top. The same situation applies to the mountains more prominent than adjacent ones. Unlike mountains, industrial and infrastructure objects are usually much thinner, which makes them hard to notice and photograph because of their angular width.

==== Object location ====
The location of the observed object plays an important role, making it visible or not even from a small distance. The best visible are freestanding mountains or mountain ranges isolated from the mountain chain regardless of their relative altitude. Likewise, separated mountains, industrial telecoms, and infrastructure objects are also visible from the range because they are usually higher than the surrounding area. The telecommunications transmitters are often inherent elements of the mountains, making them easily distinguishable from others.

==== Topography along the line of sight ====
Sometimes the prominent object can be hidden by another one standing somewhere in the middle between it and the observer. It happens usually inside the massive, often parallel mountain range, where a lot of peaks having a similar altitude block some distant mountain chains visible in the theoretical sense. An opposite situation takes place when a vast plain, lowland, or large water body separates the remote massive chains. The circumstances that are the most favorable for seeing and capturing objects from the biggest possible distance, the best example is the current world's record established in South America . Both mountain ranges separated by lowland from each other must be high enough to be visible at long range like this. There are only a few places on Earth, where a similar or bigger result can be achieved.

=== Astronomical ===
The most important astronomical factors determining the conditions of long-distance observations are:

- Diurnal position of the Sun
- Presence of moonlight
- Seasonal variation of the sunrise and sunset azimuth
- Changes the range of azimuth at moonrise and moonset
- Rare phenomena

==== Diurnal position of the Sun ====
This is the most obvious astronomical factor, as the main source of light shapes the light scattering conditions on haze and visual object appearance.

When an object is located at a similar azimuth to the Sun, then its observation conditions are the worst. Because of the forward light scattering the haze concentrated nearby, the solar azimuth has a whitish appearance blocking the light reflected from an observed object's surface.

The effect of progressively shifting Sun angle on the appearance of a vista as seen from Canyonlands National Park. In each image air quality is the same. 1, 2 – represents a moment after sunrise; 3, 4 – a vista around noon, when the angular distance to the Sun is the biggest, hence visibility is the best (Malm, 2016).

On the other hand, the Sun travels across the sky changing its position against the observed object. It also reflects changes in the contrast of this object.

The solar azimuth always goes along with its angle above the horizon. When the Sun shines higher, less amount of light is scattered by the atmosphere toward the observer. Besides, the vista reflects more light, which results in more image-forming information (reflected photons from the vista) reaching the human eye. Otherworldly, the contrast detail and scene are enhanced.

The specific situation occurs at twilight when the Sun is below the horizon. This is the moment when the light scattering takes hold in the atmosphere. In the shaded part of the atmosphere, the secondary scattering takes place. As twilight progresses most of the atmospheric aerosols have an extinction coefficient decreasing in magnitude with increasing wavelength.

==== Presence of moonlight ====
The moonlight plays a role analogous to the sunlight, but it is about 500,000 times fainter. As a result, long-exposure photography is required to achieve a decent observation. Full moon conditions are pretty much the same as considered for the daylight. The Moon is the only significant natural light source beyond the Sun, which can seriously impact the scene's visibility. All other celestial light sources are too weak to improve visibility at night, except perhaps at an excellent dark-sky site combined with advanced long-exposure photography techniques. Besides, since the Moon orbits the Earth on a lunar monthly cycle, moonlight is only available intermittently, and varies from one day to the next. Specifically, unfavorable conditions occur when Moon shines lower above the horizon at twilight on the other side of the sky, where the sun is setting or is about to rise. The forward scattering makes distant objects in an antisolar direction (inside the Earth's shadow) more difficult to spot. A combination of shaded Earth's atmosphere with relatively strong moonlight flattens the contrast between the sky and distant features. In practice, the just-noticeable difference falls closer, reducing the visual range towards this direction.

==== Seasonal variations of the sunrise and sunset azimuth ====
Because of the annual variations of Earth's axial tilt the range of sunrise/sunset azimuth changes accordingly. Basically, its changes occur daily with the exception of around-solstice periods when are barely noticeable. The quickest change of these azimuths falls roughly at the Equinox.

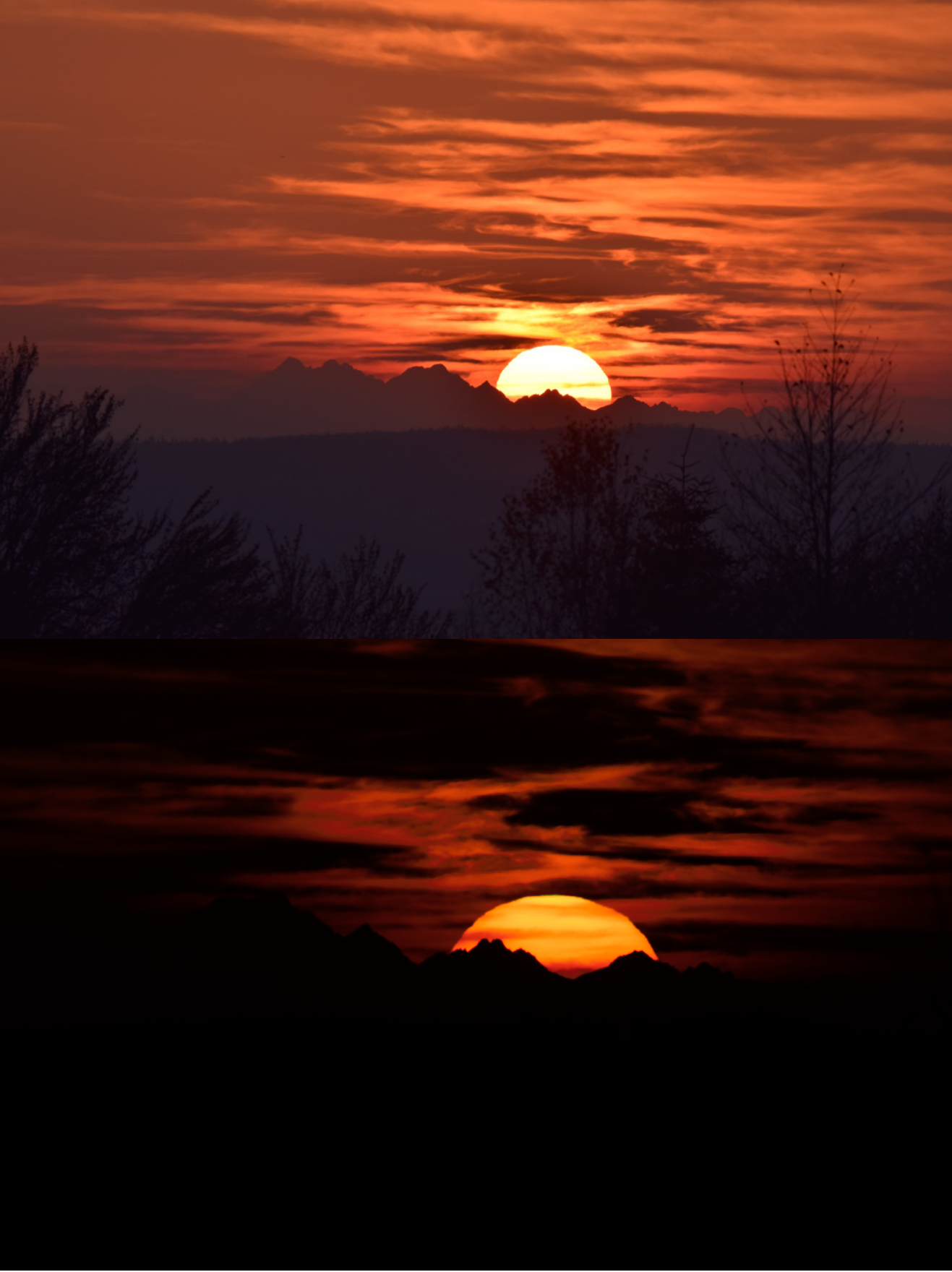
Sunset above the High Tatra Mts saw from Łęki Strzyżowskie in Poland. See also the green rim at the top of the solar limb (bottom image).

These seasonal changes of solar azimuth come along with shifts of the twilight glow azimuth either. By rough knowledge of the solar azimuth on a given day, we are usually able to capture a distant mountain emerging on its disk. It's beneficial, especially during a hazy day when the captured object is not visible. It happens only rarely when the Sun is completely blocked by haze. This situation is mostly identified with misty conditions or smog. On a clear day, the solar disk visible at the horizon is much brighter than the surrounding sky, if the observed object is too small (i.e. phone transmitter) some filters or short exposures with narrow aperture can be essential. The yearly changes in the twilight azimuth determine the contrast enhancement between a certain part of our horizon and the sky that is still illuminated by the Sun. Considering the northern hemisphere after sunset, the wintertime will be supportive for objects visible at the south-western and western horizon, whereas, around the summer solstice, the north-western horizon will be the best or even the northern at the latitudes, where nautical white nights occur.

==== Changes the range of azimuth at moonrise and moonset ====
Analogously to the Sun, the Moon can rise or set beyond some distant objects on Earth. The major difference is in the brightness, which plays an important role in terms of the thick atmosphere of the Earth at the horizon line. When the atmosphere is not clear enough, moonlight cannot break through it, making the Moon invisible even before astronomical sunset. Furthermore, every 18.9 years, due to the lunar precession, a lunar standstill period occurs. This is to some extent analogous to the solar solstice. Because the Moon's orbit has 5.15° inclination on average, it translates into more various azimuths of the rise and set. During a major lunar standstill the range of these azimuths is about 10.3° wider than solar ones as it reaches a declination of ± 28.6°. In practice, the moonrise or moonset can happen above objects located far south or north against the extremal azimuth range observed for the sunrise and sunset. Another feature that slightly affects long-distance observations at night is the lunar twilight, which can be observed mostly on high-level clouds located ahead of the distant object.

==== Rare phenomena ====
This is a group of celestial events which can ease watching of the remote objects, but occur rarely or even extremely rarely. They are restricted in timing or space:

- Total solar eclipses – allows extension of the visual range extension, making some far-off mountains visible even in hazy conditions. However, this extension is restricted to the umbral edges only. In practice, this means that an observer cannot see objects at a longer distance than the diameter of the lunar shadow. The solar eclipse configuration is also important: when it occurs near sunrise or sunset or even below the horizon, the lunar shadow is extremely elongated from one side of the sky to the other. The section of the sky that is in shadow automatically reduces the contrast with the far-off horizon, making it hard to distinguish.

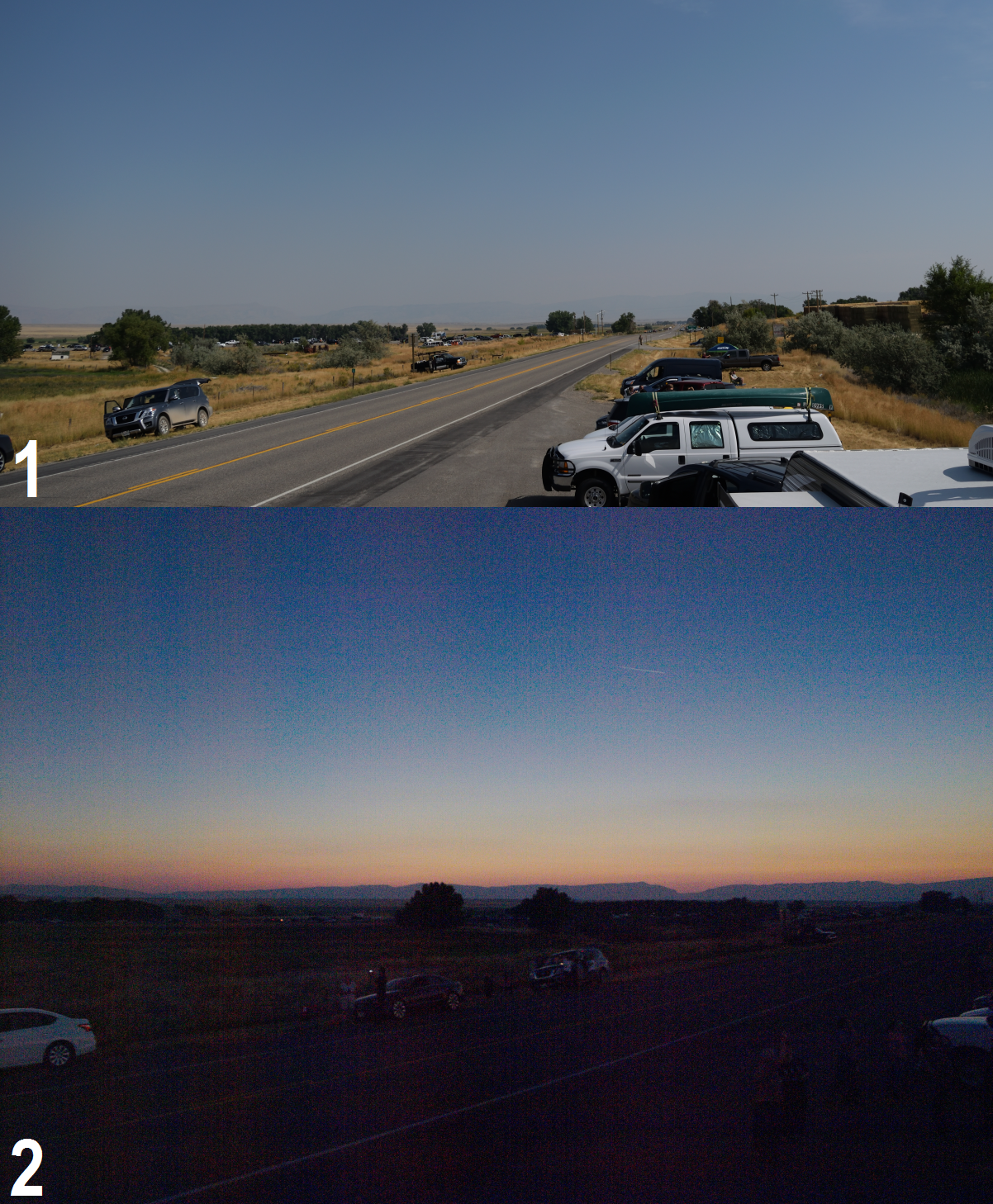
The appearance of the Owl Creek Mountains before and during the total solar eclipse of August 21, 2017. Visibility was significantly improved when the whole line of sight fell within the lunar shadow.

- Meteors – these have a very short duration, but sometimes produce brighter light than moonlight. As they are so rare, there are no confirmed distant observations.
- Rocket contrails – also very rare. If an observer is far enough from the launch site, this type of contrail can be seen just above the horizon far earlier before the astronomical dawn, and locally improve the contrast of a dark distant object.
- Planetary ephemerides – very rarely, a planet such as Jupiter or Venus will rise or set above some prominent distant object or construction. This type of observation is extremely difficult because it needs to be photographed with a combination of large zoom with long exposure.
- Noctilucent clouds – this only occurs in early summer. Because of its brightness, it can produce a large contrast difference between the distant objects plunged into the darkness. It might only occur under clear air mass conditions, which reduces atmospheric extinction. The rarity of such events is due to the required combination of noctilucent clouds and unusually clear weather.

=== Meteorological ===
- Air masses influence
- Various weather conditions inside a particular air mass
- Air mass dynamic
- Haze concentration

==== Haze concentration ====
The level of haze in the atmosphere, which is primarily visible aftermath is the color of the sky. As research shows, the blueness of the sky can vary significantly depending on the density of aerosols. In the clearest conditions, which apply mainly to the "free atmosphere" above the inversion or planetary boundary layer the sky has a deep blue color, unlike inside the hazy layer, where it acts like pale blue or even bluish-white. which varies between minimum 1 hour in the planetary boundary layer to about 1 week in the "free troposphere". It at some point defines the pace of visibility changes throughout the day following i.e. variations of humidity level. The relative humidity determines strongly the shape of aerosol particles, which eventually impacts their scattering properties. For instance, in a humid environment, light scattering is more effective, because the aerosol particles have regular shapes.
In arid conditions, the shape of aerosols is set by wind, which keeps them suspended for a long time.

=== Optical ===
- Scattering of light
- Landscape (object) features
- Blueness of a distant horizon
- Light reflection at angle of incidence
- Light pollution
- Distant spotlights

==== Scattering of light ====
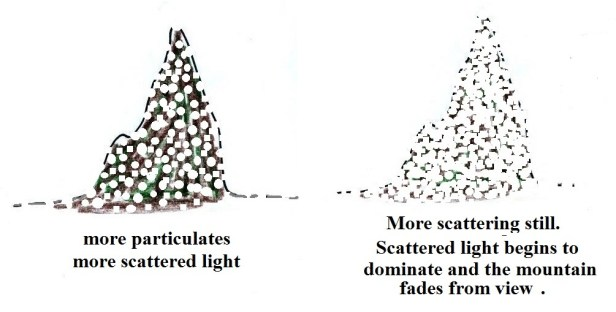
The visibility impairment, caused by dense haze or water droplet (atmo.arizona.edu).

The scattering of light plays an important role in the visibility of distant features. Everything depends on three major factors, which are the presence of the major source of light, the degree of atmosphere clarity between the observer and distant feature, and the local pattern of the light scattering which depends on the light reflection from some objects or clouds. Regardless of the degree of aerosol pollution in the atmosphere, we always list two major types of light scattering:
- Forward scattering – typical for angular distance from the major source of light smaller than 90°,
- Backward scattering – occurring at an angular distance higher than 90° from the major source of light.
In daylight conditions, the distant objects located in the antisolar direction are better visible, because the backward scattering doesn't reduce the visibility as strongly as forward scattering.

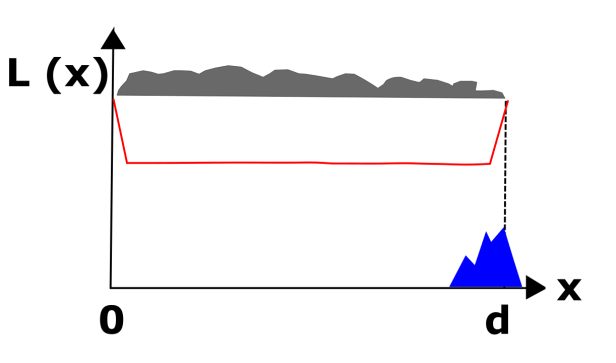
Visibility conditions under an overcast sky between an observer and distant feature are the best because of the lowest level of light scattering by aerosols and air molecules.

Quite the opposite situation occurs at twilight when twilight wedge becomes visible. At this moment the distant objects located in opposition to the solar azimuth are less visible due to vanishing contrast between the sky and ground, which loses its luminance quickly. The effect of light scattering depends on the size of the particles, whereas the weakest is typical for near-Rayleigh conditions and the strongest for dese haze particles suspended in the atmosphere. The substantial presence of aerosols in the Earth's atmosphere, especially within the Planetary boundary layer degrades the scene significantly. This phenomenon tends to produce a distinctive gray hue, which affects atmospheric transparency. Light from the atmosphere and light reflected from an object is absorbed and scattered by aerosol particles leading to significant deterioration of visibility.
This regularity applies to the clear day when the sky is free of clouds. It happens very often, that cloudiness occurs. Clouds block the direct sunlight decreasing the light scattering at once. Thus the visual range is extended. The presence of clouds results in nonuniform solar illumination across the line of sight and inhomogeneous irradiance of the atmosphere at once. Thick clouds determine a perfect light diffusion, which is next radiated uniformly in all directions. Considering the viewing line between the observer and the distant object, the illuminated aerosols directly by the Sun scatter light more efficiently on the contrary to shaded aerosols. For the observers, the best situation occurs when the cloud cover stretches between their observation place and remote objects. However, the sky beyond these objects remains clear and bright. In turn, the contrast between the shaded distant feature and the bright sky beyond is the best, giving the highest chance to see this object. On the other hand, is fairly not possible to detect any details of object texture, as it remains completely shaded.

==== Landscape (object) features ====
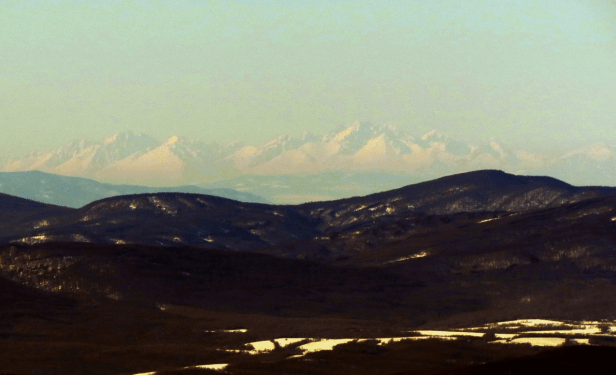
An example of snow-capped mountains visible from about 200 km distance under clear atmospheric conditions (credits: Shukaj Vitalij)

Every landscape feature has its own color, texture, form, and brightness. The easiest feature to recognize from a distance is definitely the form. Mountains act as domes, beacons, buttes, or steep objects (triangles, protrusions, etc.). The second element, which can help with recognizing the distant object is its color and texture. In the case of mountains, especially not forested we can see their structure changes annually (summer-winter) by the presence of snow coverage. The color pattern of the landscape comes along with its brightness. Brightness makes the object more or less visible against the background. When the object's surface is brighter the light is reflected more effectively. It makes the reflected beam from this object stronger and more capable of reaching the distant observer. The object illuminance influences the scattering coefficient. Additionally, we can take into account the anthropogenic features of the object, which come down to the artificial light emission or reflection. Some skyscrapers can perfectly reflect the sunlight, producing glitters visible far away. On the other hand, if an object shines during the night, can be also visible much further than normally would be.

==== Light reflection at angle of incidence ====
The important element here is the plane of incidence, which is the angle between a ray incident on the surface and a perpendicular line to the surface at the point of incidence. In a practical sense, the angle of incidence is always equal to the angle of reflection. When the light source is low above the horizon, the light beam can be almost parallel to the surface producing the grazing incidence. Concluding, the observer can see the reflected beam on the surface exactly at the plane of incidence. This plane of incidence determines the Sun glitter appearance, which exact pattern is determined by the precise location of the watcher. It is composed of a multitude of suns stating as the little mirror, as a perfectly smooth surface can contain one glint. These glints are rather elliptical with an aspect ratio depending on the observer's altitude. Along with the low position of the bright source of light above the horizon comes the light reflectance value, which gradually increases as the source of light is lower above the horizon. Since latitude plays a role in the elevation of the Sun above the horizon, light penetration is always less at higher altitudes. The light reflection on the water body has a diffuse character, which means, that the angle of incidence does not appear as a straight line. Its border is usually very fuzzy with a gentle reduction of single glitters when moving away from the major line. At the end of every line of light reflection, an observer can spot sudden darkening of the horizon called the Contrast triangle, which can push the visibility threshold a bit beyond.
The light reflection at the angle of incidence applies also to various other sources of light not only direct but also scattered like clouds or the sky. Therefore, they appear mirror-like on the smooth water. The role of scattered light reflected on the waterbody is significant, especially during twilight at solar azimuth, which builds up a big contrast between the illuminated sky and the shaded distant landscape feature. The analog phenomenon, but usually short-lived is the Glint. Glint is only the moment when the light is reflected, but it can be seen far away due to the light strength, even from about 200 km distance.

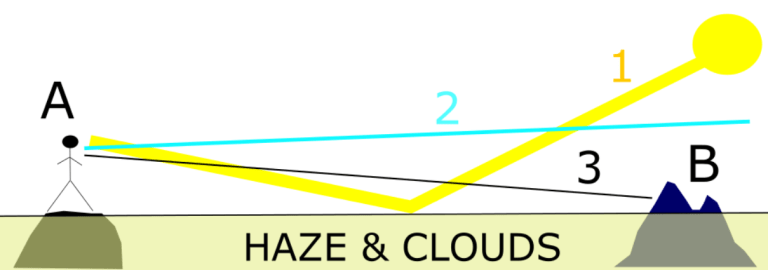
The visibility of distant features above the haze or cloud deck can be enhanced by contrast difference caused by the light reflected from the haze, from the sky just above horizon beyond and the shaded feature itself.

An analog phenomenon applies to clouds or haze. The common denominator here is just the difference between the medium on which the surface of the light is reflected or scattered. The described effect might occur everywhere where the light reflection or scattering near the angle of incidence occurs at a denser medium. This denser medium can be the haze trapped inside the inversion layer, which remains somewhat the plain water surface. Because of the different physical states of the air body including haze, the way of light distribution varies significantly. The haze layer causes a much wider angle of reflection because the solar beam is cloven on small particles. The same situation applies to the cloud deck marking the top of inversion layer. The cloud deck marks the area, where the dew point is reached, which ramps up the light reflection considerably. Observers located above the haze or cloud layer can effectively see the 3 major levels of brightness: from the inversion layer (clouds or haze), from the object, and also from the illuminated atmosphere beyond. These circumstances can be altered by snow coverage, which changes significantly the albedo of the distant feature surface unless it's forested. The high albedo of the distant object being just underneath the Sun flattens the contrast, making it less visible to an observer. On the other hand, the mountains located at the solar azimuth in the wintertime, when the Sun is low, usually shade themselves. Therefore, the albedo plays a minor role here.

=== Geometric ===
- Earth curvature
- Terrestrial refraction

== Essential tools ==
Planning long-distance observations often requires studying the destination area. The observer obviously can see distant objects on-site, although without decent tools is unable to identify them properly. The traditional tourist map might be not enough for this purpose, especially because of their primary objective. We have obviously a wide choice of maps for hiking tourism, which contains a rich set of names of peaks, passes and valleys and detailed representation of the relief, which should result in a good orientation in hard terrain. A vast majority of these maps are large-scaled, which is impractical for identifying remote objects, as their locations are far outside of the tourist map. For proper recognition of these far-off silhouettes, an observer needs at least a few maps such as this. Moreover, the process of manual object identification is usually time-consuming and impossible on-site without advanced topography knowledge acquired before.

With the growth of the Internet, this method is not used anymore or used occasionally for smaller areas or for mountain guide course purposes. In exchange for it, an observer can do a relevant investigation yet at home, before setting off on the destination site by using at least a few tools available on the market.

=== Open source web-based applications ===
Ulrich Deuschle panorama generator - appears to be the best for investigating the far horizons from the place of the observation located both on the ground as well as on the fly. The application can render the distant horizon with a refraction coefficient considered giving the user the maximum estimated distance of view from the defined place worldwide.

Peakfinder - another useful application, which covers the entire globe with the mountain database replicated from OpenStreetap. It's extremely useful for i.e. photography of sunset behind the distant landscape features.

Heywhatsthat - the query-based tool, which renders the visibility cloak coverage from the given place called the "panorama". The atmospheric refraction analyses are available.

=== Desktop software ===
QGIS Visibility analysis - advanced approach, which requires download of the digital elevation model files but gives advanced results including the terrain and potential land coverage.

Google Earth - by including the field of view (FOV) feature can simulate the view of distant horizon in real outdoor conditions. Moreover, it includes the 3D layer and other man-made constructions created i.e. in Google Sketchup application previously and loaded into Google Earth.

overlayaz - open-source application dedicated for long distance observations which helps in identification of objects in photos, provides precise distance measurements (using GeographicLib) and creates output images with overlays.

=== Other sources ===
Viewfinderpanoramas - the static website presenting a multitude of panoramic views from some of the peaks worldwide.

The View Shed - a platform for browsing and submitting views of peaks, skylines and other phenomena worldwide.

== Aerial records ==
- Mont Blanc captured from above Toulouse before sunrise in 2017 – the most extremal distance ever captured – 538 km
- Mont Blanc seen above Cologne in Germany at an altitude of 4000 m above ground level. Observation reported in 1948 – circa 530 km
- Himalayas seen above Kolkata in India at an altitude of 12400 m above ground level. Observation reported in 2019 – 522 km

== Ground-to-ground world records ==
The longest distance observation ever has been made on December 15, 2024, from a subpeak near Karagöl summit, Turkey, toward Shkhara on the Georgia–Russia border at a distance of 493 km. It was photographed by Richard Jezik.

The previous longest distance observation ever has been made on June 13, 2023 from Cerro Champaquí towards Aconcagua at a distance of 483.5 km

And before that, the previous one was: Massif des Écrins seen from the Pic de Finestrelles in the Pyrenees – 443 km, Marc Bret, July 16th 2016

World's most distant sunrise: Tête de l'Estrop from Pic de Noufonts – 408 km – Marc Bret, July 16th 2019

Other lines of sight:

The longest line of sight in the British Isles is from Snowdon to Merrick – 232 km. This was photographed by Kris Williams in 2015.

The longest line of sight that has been photographed within the USA is Denali from Mount Sanford at 227 mile distance.

Other long-distance photographs include:

- Puig d'en Galileu in the Serra de Tramuntana, Mallorca, to Pic de Saloria in the Pyrenees – 324 km – Marcos Molina.
- Wellington, New Zealand, to Mount Taranaki – 330 km – Naked eye line of sight.
