= Les Masies =

- Locality
- Location within Province of Lleida Location within Catalonia Location within Spain
- Coordinates: 42°9′39″N 1°17′16″E
- Country: Spain
- Community: Catalonia
- Province: Lleida
- Municipality: Coll de Nargó
- Elevation: 618 m (2,028 ft)

Population
  - Total: 33

Les Masies or Les Masies de Nargó is a locality located in the municipality of Coll de Nargó, in Province of Lleida province, Catalonia, Spain. As of 2020, it has a population of 33.

== Geography ==
Les Masies is located 113km northeast of Lleida.
