= Sant Joan de l'Erm =

- Interactive map of Sant Joan de l'Erm
- Nearest city: Montferrer i Castellbò, Catalonia
- Coordinates: 42°25′00″N 1°17′14″E
- Top elevation: 2,080
- Base elevation: 1,690
- Trails: Nordic skiing Black circuit: 2 km Red circuit : 26 km Blue circuit: 15 km Green circuit: 7 km Skating circuit: 18 km
- Website: website

Sant Joan de l'Erm is a Catalan ski resort located in the Castellbò valley, in Montferrer i Castellbò.

This Nordic skiing resort is in the midst of forests of Scots Pine, Mountain Pine and fir, and the trails range from 1,700 meters high in the refuge of Basseta to 2,050 m of Prat de Montaner from which you can reach Portainé.

The ski resort opened in 1970. Altogether has 50 km of trails for skiing. They are divided according to difficulty:

- Green circuit: 7 km
- Blue circuit: 15 km
- Red circuit: 26 km
- Black circuit: 2 km
- Skating circuit: 18 km
