= El Balcó del Pirineu =

Human settlement in Montferrer i Castellbò, Alt Urgell, Lleida Province, Spain

Coordinates: 42°20′40″N 1°26′09″E

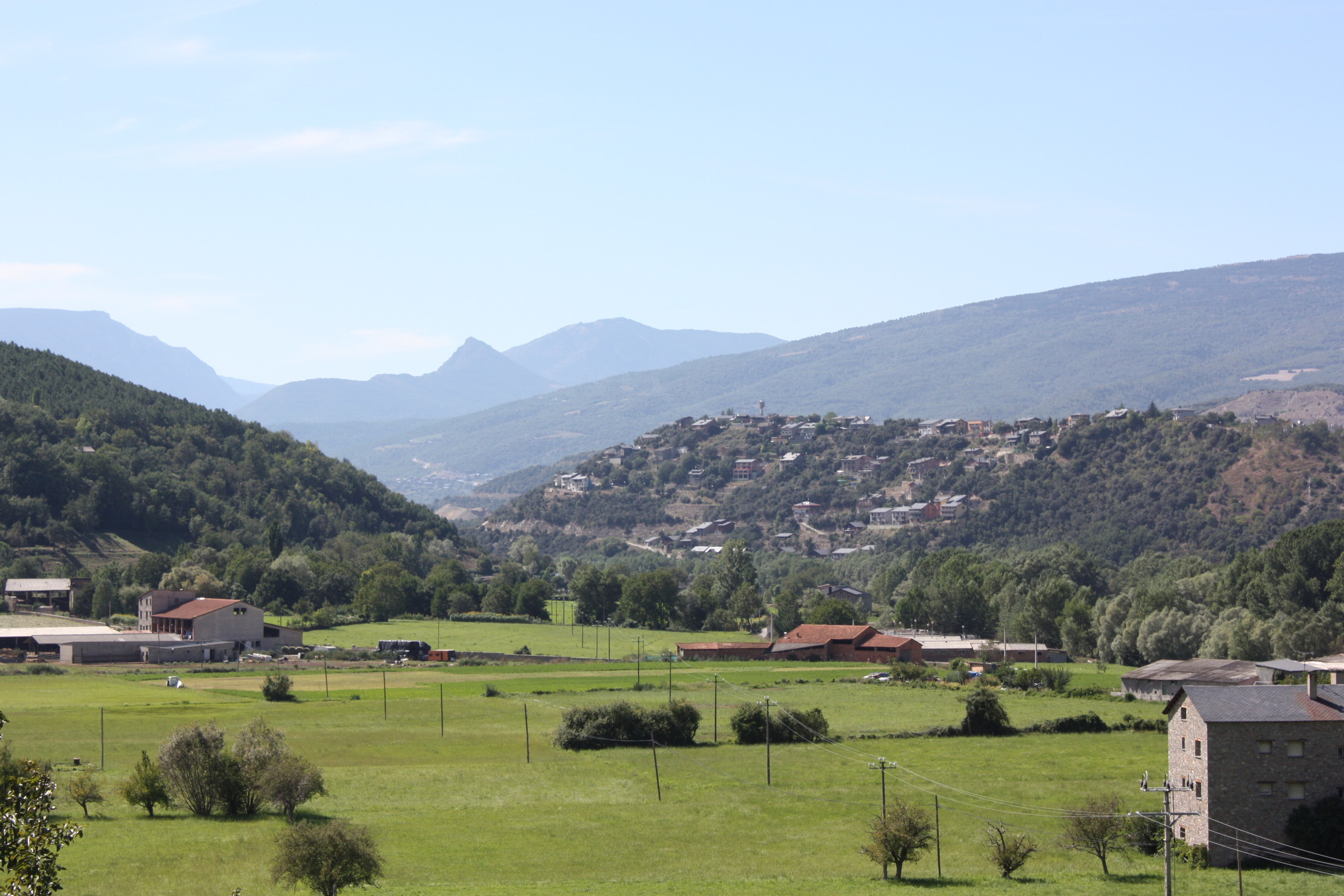
El Balcó del Pirineu

El Balcó del Pirineu (Pyrenees Balcony in English) is a residential area in Montferrer i Castellbò (Catalonia). El Balcó del Pirineu was urbanised in 1975 on a mountain range next to the river Segre, near of Montferrer and Castellciutat villages, in the same mountain range.
