= Castellciutat =

Human settlement in Catalonia, Spain

Coordinates: 42°21′21.43″N 1°26′37.95″E

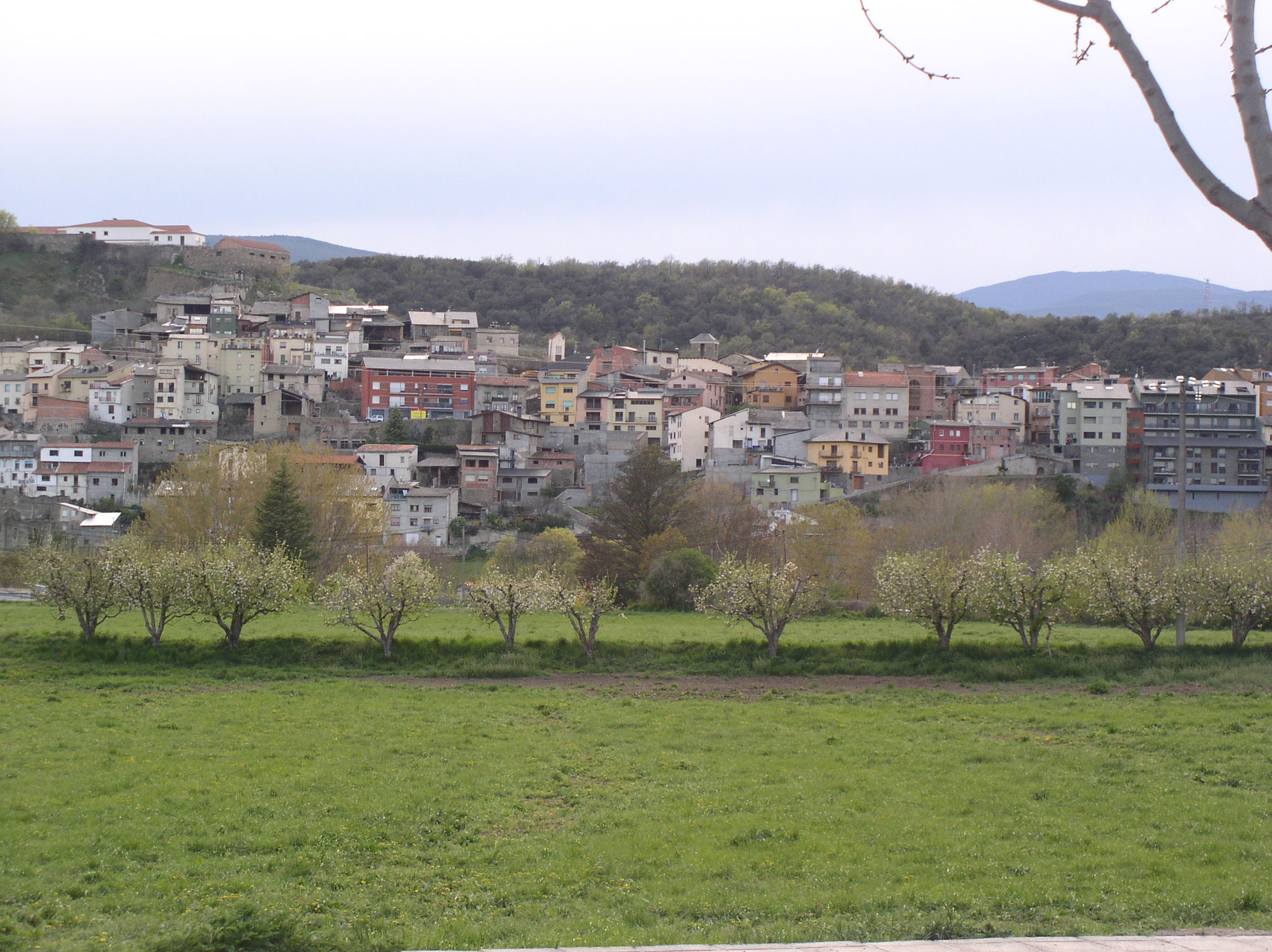
Castellciutat village

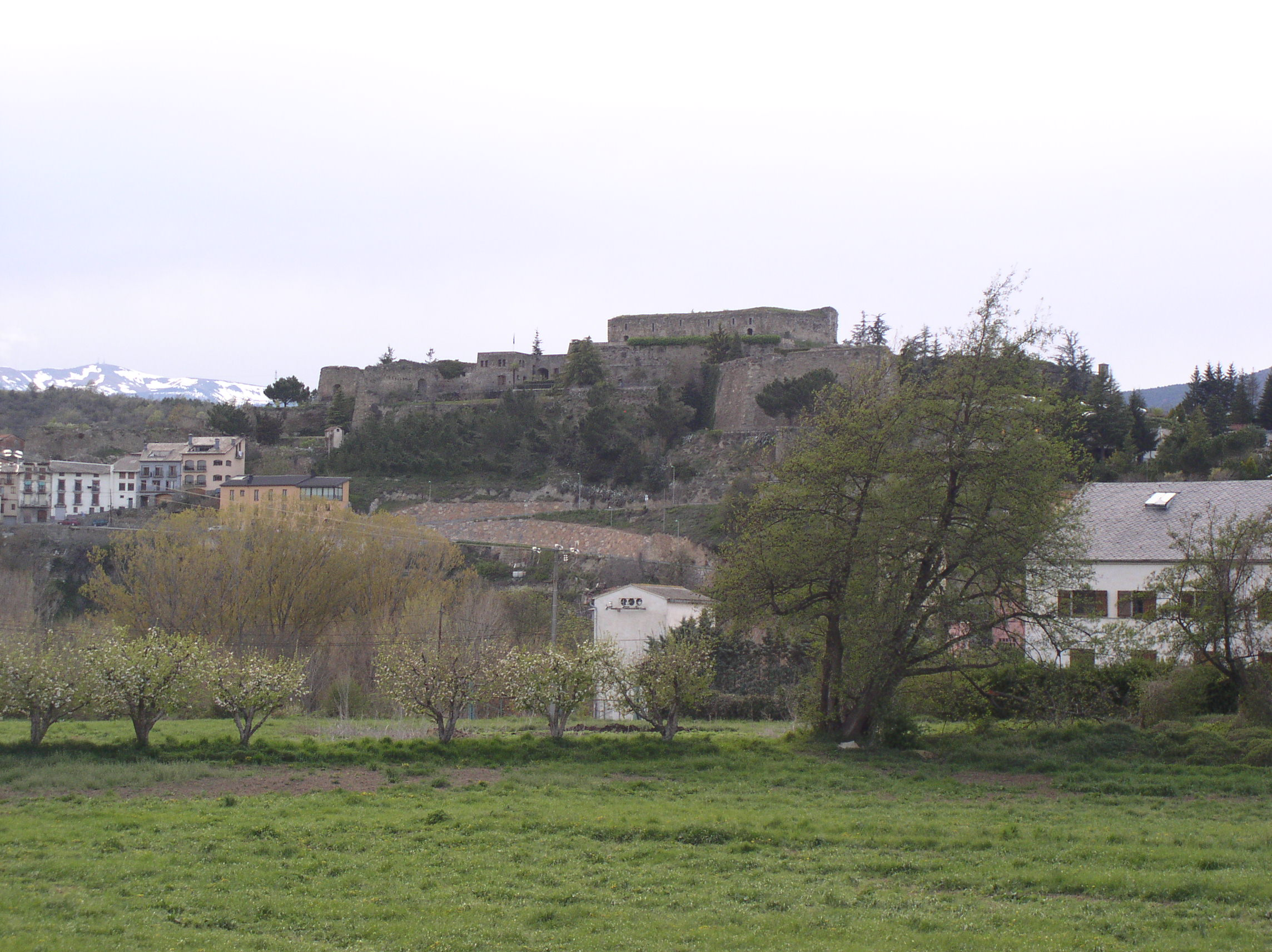
View towards the old castle

Castellciutat (Catalan pronunciation: [kəsˌteʎsiwˈtat]) is a village in the municipality of la Seu d'Urgell (Alt Urgell, Catalonia). In the past it was called Ciutat (City in English) but is now called either Ciutat or Castellciutat. It has a population of 451 inhabitants.

There is an old castle, Castell de Ciutat (Castle of the City), which gives its name to the village.

== See also ==
- El Balcó del Pirineu
