= Bellestar =

Coordinates: 42°22′04.80″N 1°25′10.49″E

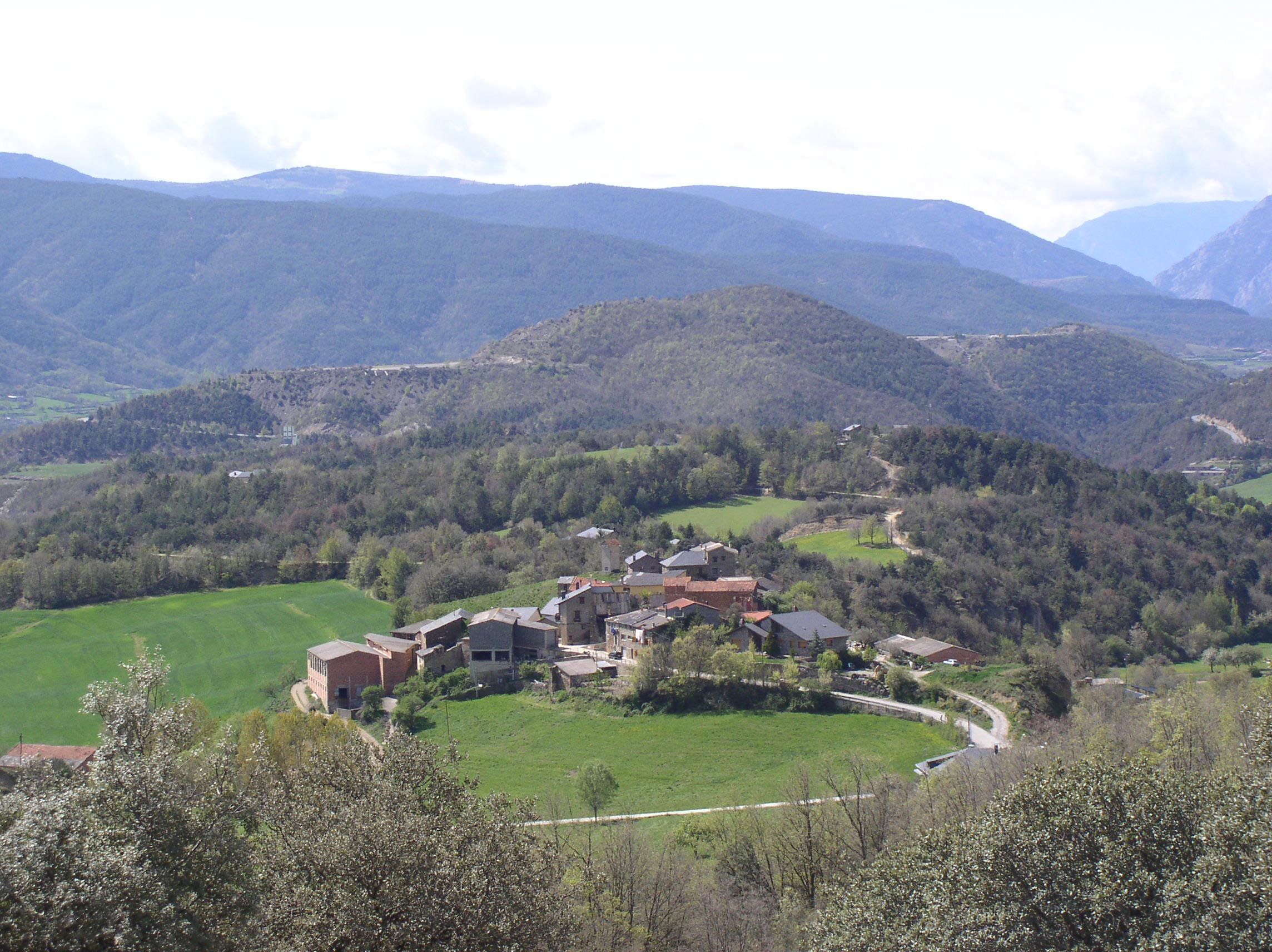
Bellestar

Bellestar (Catalan pronunciation: [baʎesˈta]) it is a small town in the municipality of Montferrer i Castellbò, in Alt Urgell, Catalonia. It lies to west of the small river Mare de Déu de la Trobada. It has a population of approximately 90.

Municipality of Montferrer i Castellbò

Comarca of Alt Urgell
