= Santa Cecília de Elins =

Monastery in Montferrer i Castellbò, Spain

Coordinates: 42°20′56″N 1°18′52″E

Santa Cecília de Elins is a former Romanesque Benedictine monastery in the municipality of Montferrer i Castellbò, Catalonia, Spain, to the southeast of the village of Cassovall. It is a Bien de Interés Cultural site. The monastery was documented in 865 but fell into decline in the tenth century. On 29 December 1080 the Bishop of Urgell Bernat Guillem consecrated a new church with three altars dedicated to St. Cecilia, Virgin Mary and Santa Fe. During the fourteenth century it fell into decline and in 1383 it was reduced in status to a priory. By 1680 the monastery fell into ruins. It was converted into a farmhouse in the 1940s.
