= Valldarques =

- Locality
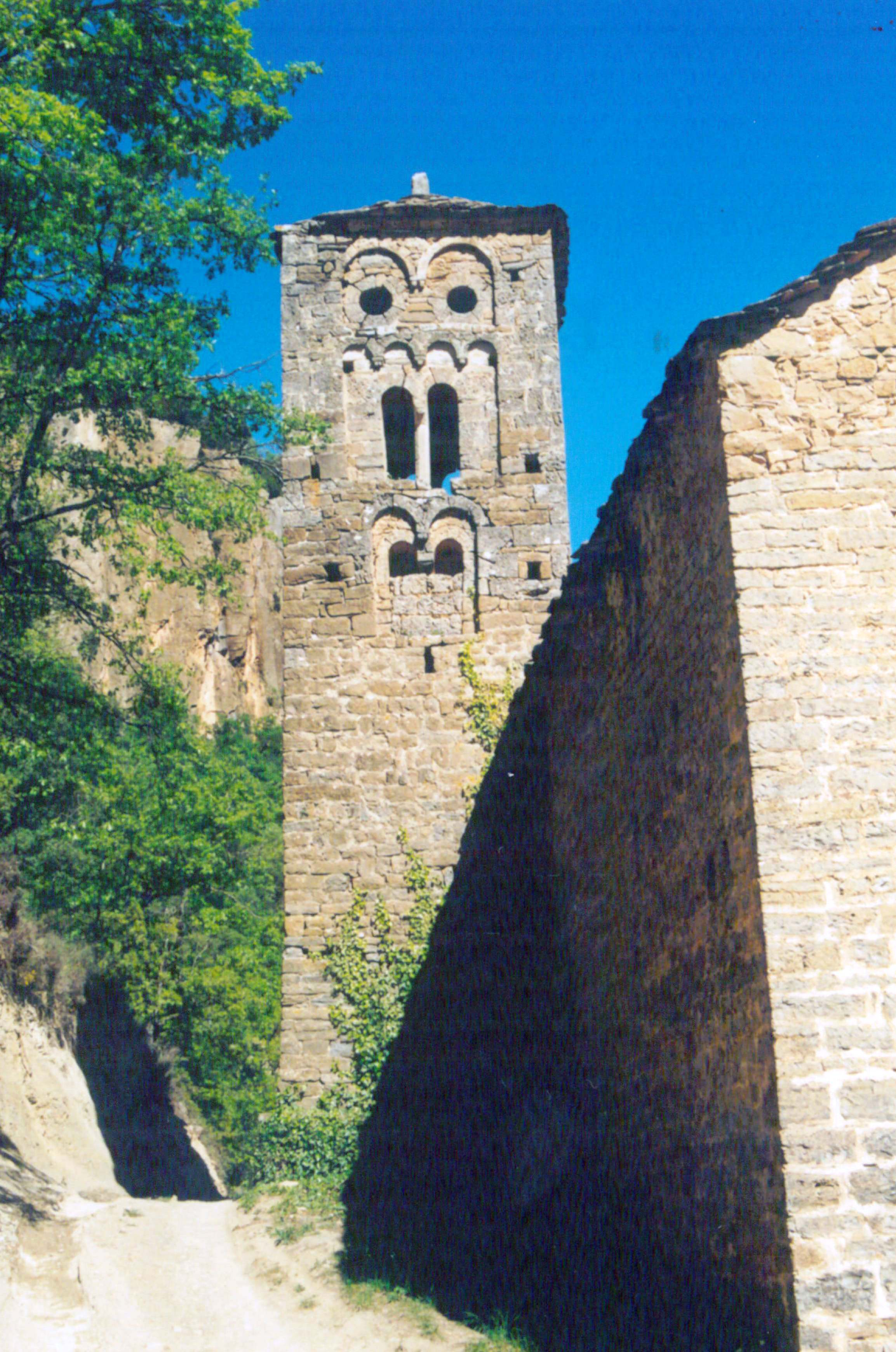

- Location within Province of Lleida Location within Catalonia Location within Spain
- Coordinates: 42°8′58″N 1°13′37″E
- Country: Spain
- Community: Catalonia
- Province: Lleida
- Municipality: Coll de Nargó
- Elevation: 879 m (2,884 ft)

Population
  - Total: 10

Valldarques is a locality located in the municipality of Coll de Nargó, in Province of Lleida province, Catalonia, Spain. As of 2020, it has a population of 10.

== Geography ==
Valldarques is located 126km northeast of Lleida.
