= Gavarra =

- Locality
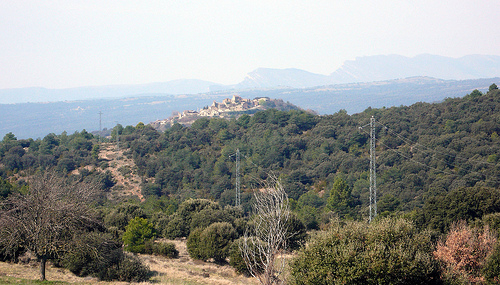

- Location within Province of Lleida Location within Catalonia Location within Spain
- Coordinates: 42°6′14″N 1°11′42″E
- Country: Spain
- Community: Catalonia
- Province: Lleida
- Municipality: Coll de Nargó
- Elevation: 1,123 m (3,684 ft)

Population
  - Total: 31

Gavarra is a locality located in the municipality of Coll de Nargó, in Province of Lleida province, Catalonia, Spain. As of 2020, it has a population of 31.

== Geography ==
Gavarra is located 134km northeast of Lleida.

== See also ==
- La Gavarra (1527 ship) – used in the conquest of Yucatán
