= Montanissell =

- Locality
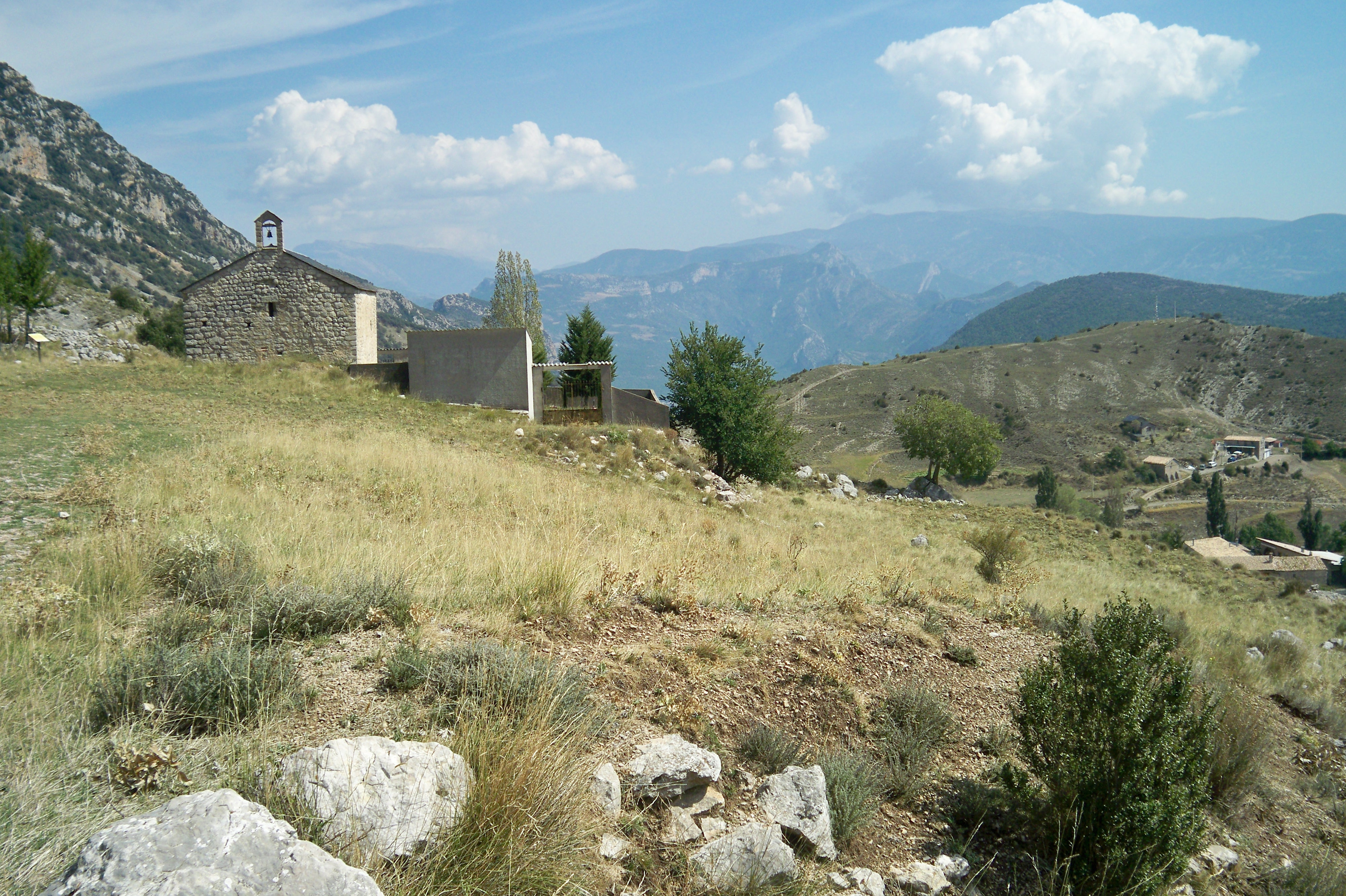

- Location within Province of Lleida Location within Catalonia Location within Spain
- Coordinates: 42°11′58″N 1°15′6″E
- Country: Spain
- Community: Catalonia
- Province: Lleida
- Municipality: Coll de Nargó
- Elevation: 1,130 m (3,710 ft)

Population
  - Total: 19

Montanissell is a locality located in the municipality of Coll de Nargó, in Province of Lleida province, Catalonia, Spain. As of 2020, it has a population of 19.

== Geography ==
Montanissell is located 125km northeast of Lleida.
