= Monturull =

Mountain in Catalonia, Spain

Coordinates: 42°27′01″N 1°34′54″E

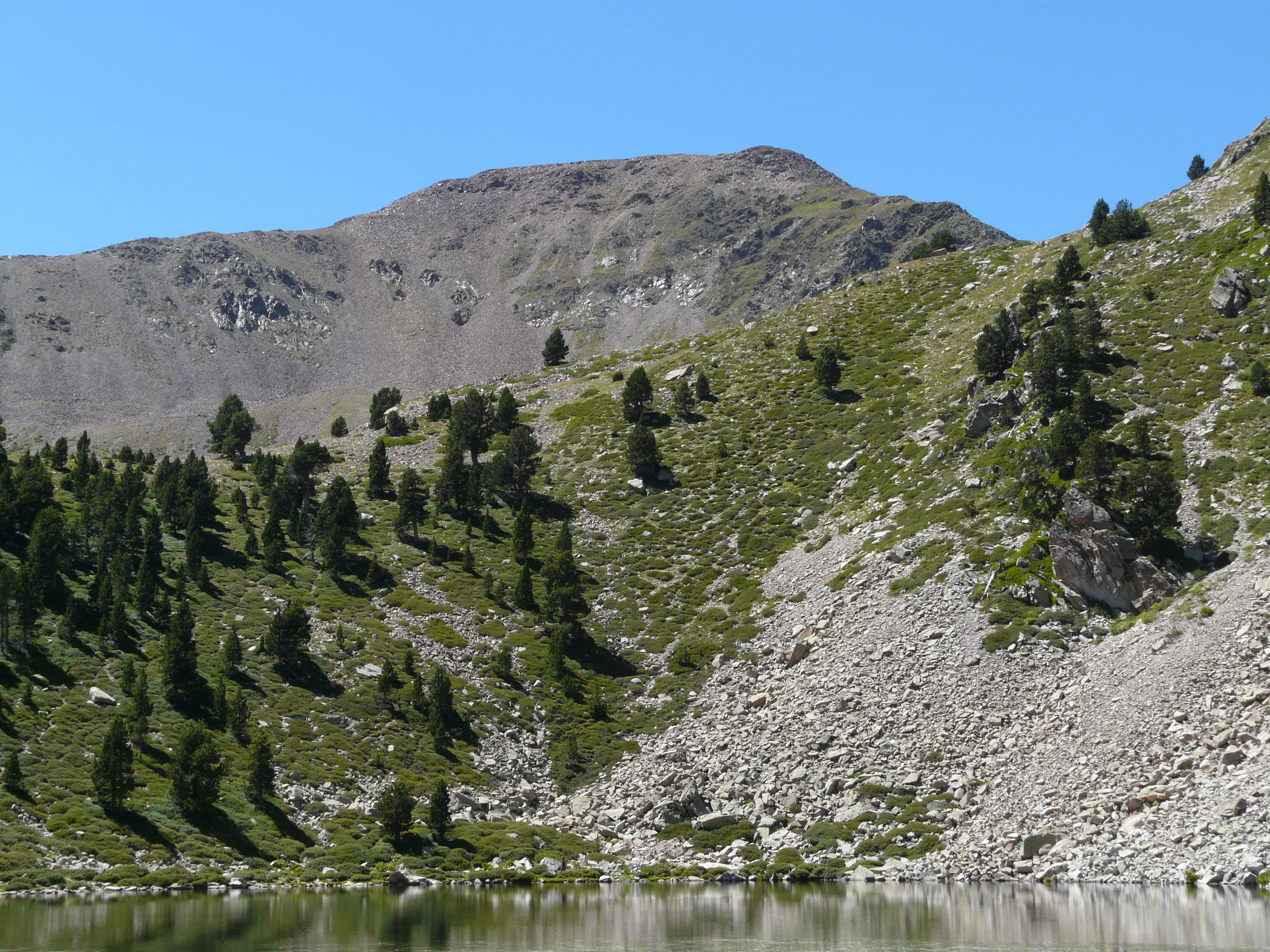
- Monturull mountain and Estany Gran de la Pera lake

Highest point
- Elevation: 2,761 m (9,058 ft)

Geography
- Location: Catalonia, Spain
- Parent range: Pyrenees

Monturull is a mountain of Catalonia, Spain. Located in the Pyrenees, it has an elevation of 2,761 metres above sea level.

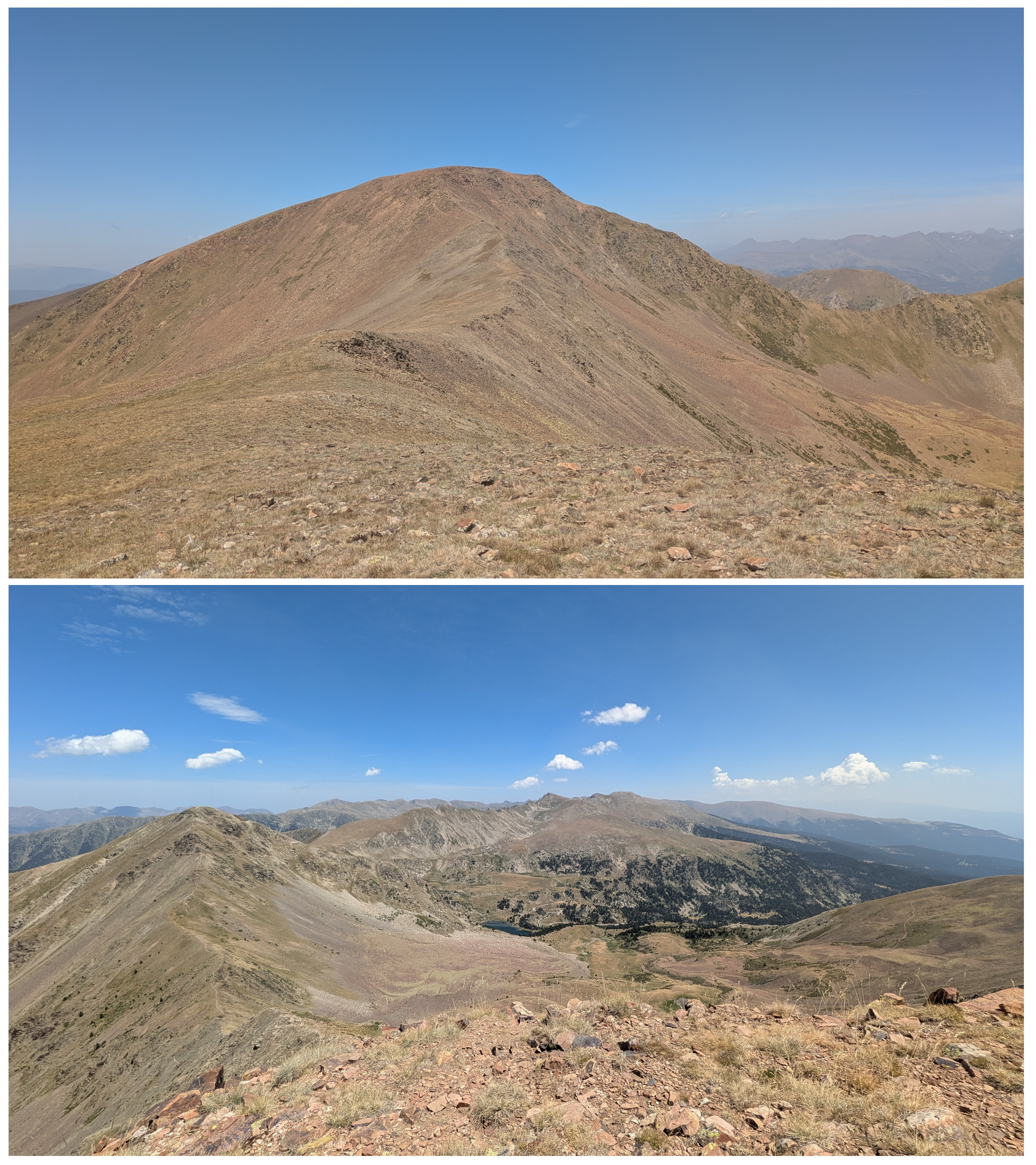
Monturull mountain (image above) is underlain by Cambrian metasediments (sandstone and schist). It lies on the western edge of the huge Mont-Louis - Andorra hercynian granite pluton. This pluton extends 55 kilometres to the east of Monturull, across parts of Spain, Andorra and France. In the image below, taken on the summit, brown-coloured Cambrian metasediments are seen giving way to lighter-coloured granodiorite in the mountains extending eastwards beyond the lake.

== See also ==
- Mountains of Catalonia
