= Montferrer i Castellbò =

- Municipality
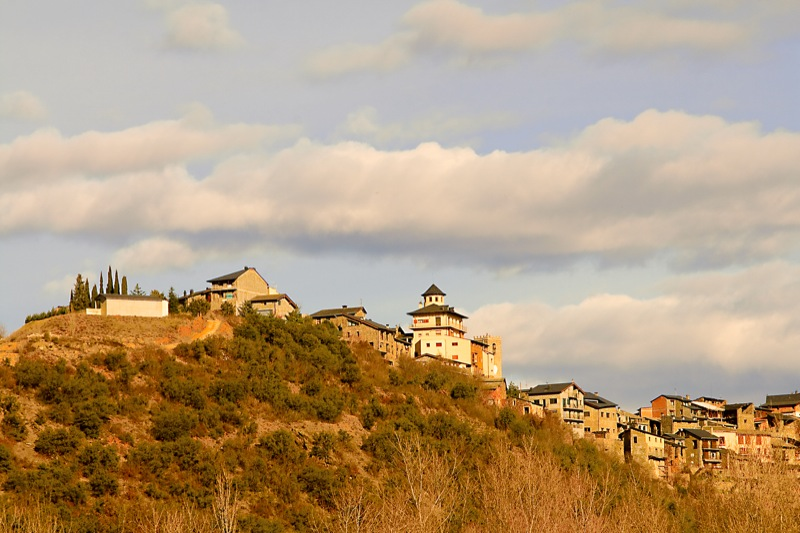
- Montferrer

- Coat of arms

- Location in Catalonia
- Coordinates: 42.343°N 1.429°E
- Country: Spain
- Community: Catalonia
- Province: Lleida
- Comarca: Alt Urgell

Government
  - Mayor: Albert Marquet Lacaya (2015)

Area
  - Total: 176.7 km^{2} (68.2 sq mi)

Population (2025-01-01)
  - Total: 1,161
  - Density: 6.570/km^{2} (17.02/sq mi)
- Website: www.montferrercastellbo.cat

Montferrer i Castellbò (Catalan pronunciation: [moɱfeˈrej kasˌteʎˈβɔ]) is a municipality in the comarca of Alt Urgell, Lleida, Catalonia, Spain.

Montferrer i Castellbò towns:

- Aravell
- Bellestar
- El Balcó del Pirineu
- Montferrer de Segre
- Sant Joan de l'Erm
- Vilamitjana del Cantó
- Vila-rubla

The municipality includes a small exclave to the south.

It has a population of 1,161 (register office, 2025).

Andorra–La Seu d'Urgell Airport is located in Montferrer i Castellbò.

== Landmarks ==
- Santa Cecília de Elins
