= Torreta de Cadí =

Coordinates: 42°17′13″N 1°35′04″E

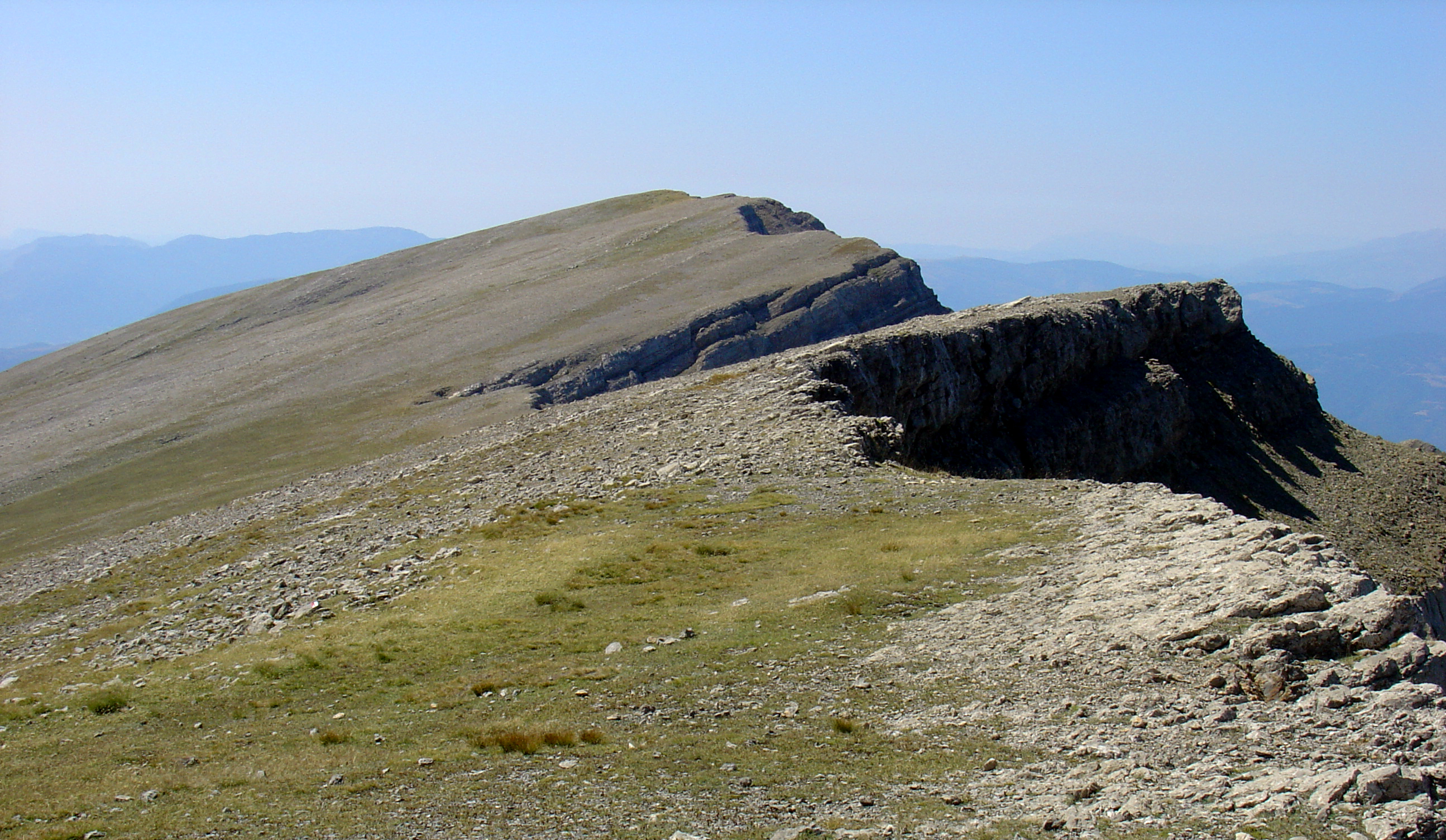
- Torreta de Cadí.

Highest point
- Elevation: 2,561 m (8,402 ft)

Geography
- Location: Catalonia, Spain

Torreta de Cadí is a mountain of Catalonia, Spain. It has an elevation of 2,561 metres above sea level.

== See also ==
- Mountains of Catalonia
