= Cap del Verd =

Coordinates: 42°12′03″N 1°36′49″E

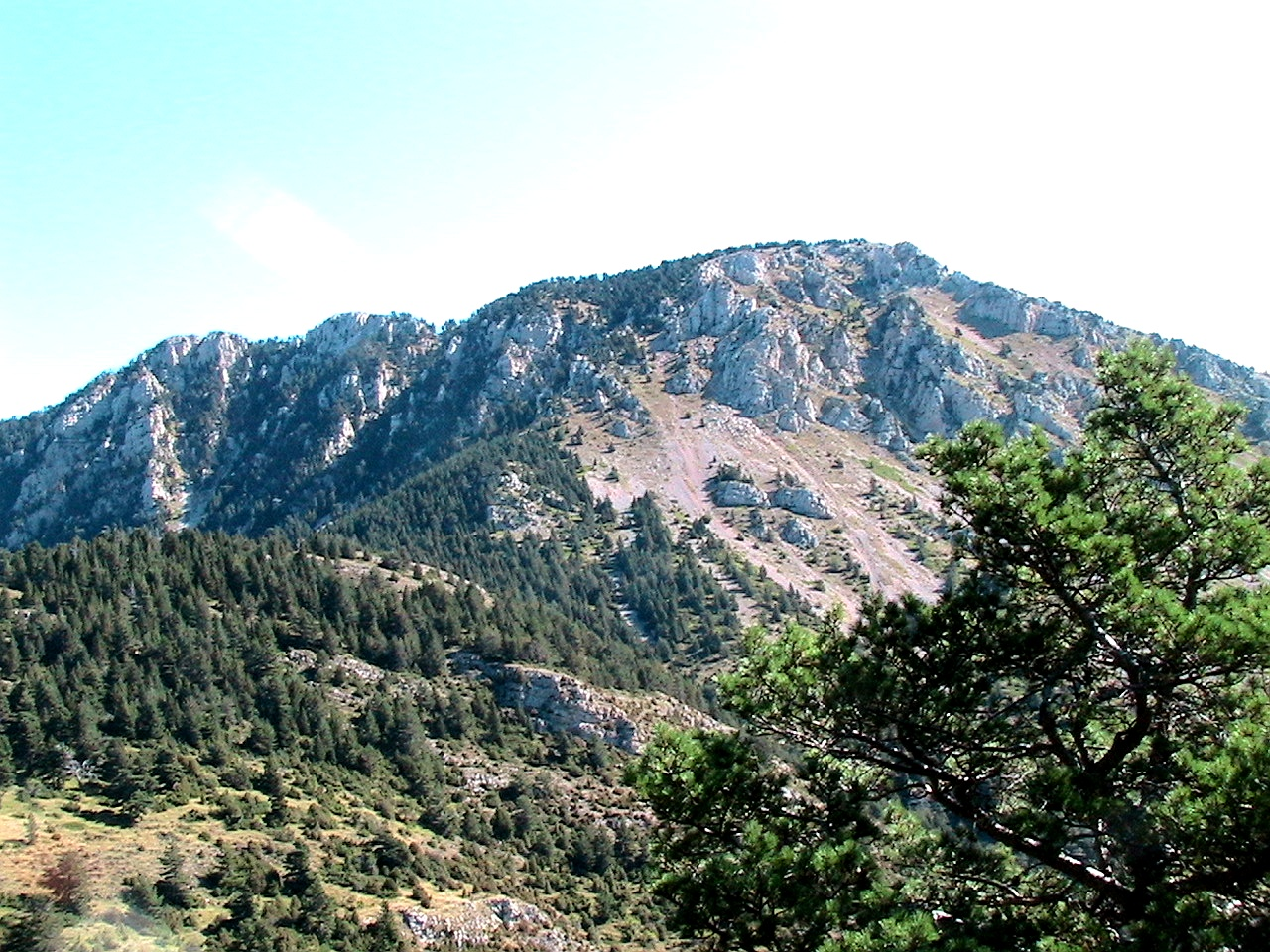

Highest point
- Elevation: 2,283 m (7,490 ft)

Geography
- Location: Catalonia, Spain

Cap del Verd is a mountain of Catalonia, Spain. It has an elevation of 2,283 metres above sea level.

== See also ==
- Mountains of Catalonia
