= Pic de Salòria =

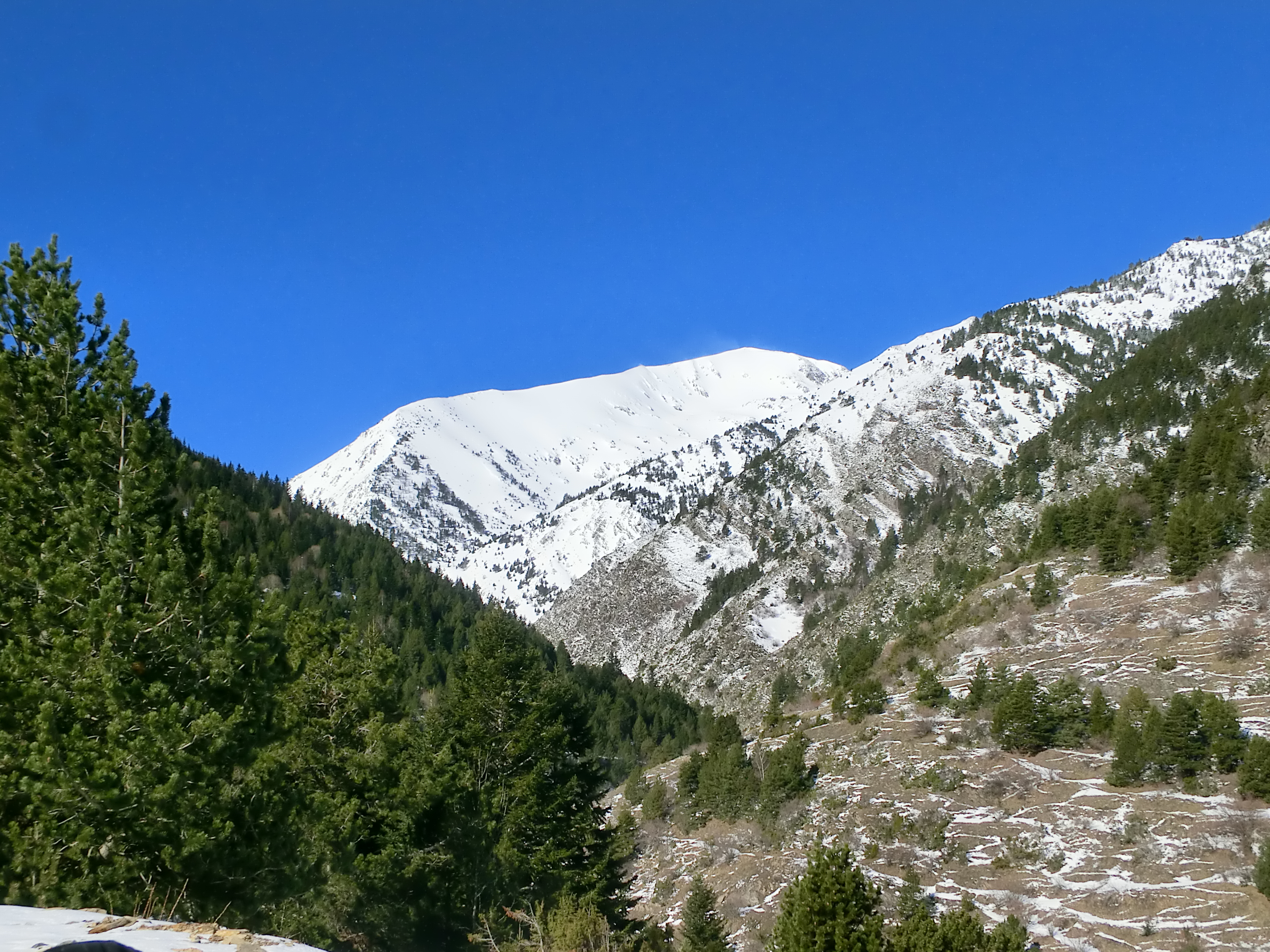

Highest point
- Elevation: 2,789 m (9,150 ft)
- Listing: List of mountains in Catalonia
- Coordinates: 42°30′52″N 1°23′06″E

Geography
- Location within Catalonia
- Location: Catalonia, Spain
- Parent range: Pyrenees

Pic de Salòria is a mountain of Catalonia, Spain. Located in the Pyrenees, it has an elevation of 2,789 metres (9,150 ft) above sea level.
