= Cyprian (disambiguation) =

Cyprian (c. 200–258) was bishop of Carthage and a notable Early Christian writer and saint.

Cyprian, Cyprianus, Saint Cyprian, or St Cyprian's may also refer to:

== People with the given name ==
=== Christian clergymen and saints ===
- Cyprian of Antioch (died 304), Christian saint martyred alongside Justina
- Cyprianus Gallus, 5th-century Latin poet
- Cyprian of Toulon, 6th-century bishop and a saint
- Cyprian of Tarragona, 7th-century bishop
- Cyprian of Córdoba (fl. 890), archpriest and poet
- Cyprian (bishop of Wrocław) (died 1207), medieval Polish bishop
- Cyprian, Metropolitan of Kiev (died 1406), a clergyman of Bulgarian origin
- Cyprian of Constantinople, Greek Orthodox Patriarch of Constantinople (1707–1709, 1713–1714)
- Cyprian of Alexandria, Greek Orthodox Patriarch of Alexandria (1766–1783)
- Cyprian Kizito Lwanga (1953–2021), Ugandan Roman Catholic prelate, Archbishop of Kampala from 2006 to his death
- Cyprian Michael Iwene Tansi (1903–1964), Nigerian priest of the Catholic Church

=== Other people ===
- Cyprian (Byzantine commander), a Byzantine military commander
- Cyprian Bhekuzulu (1924–1968), king of the Zulus in South Africa
- Cyprian Bridge (1839–1924), British Royal Navy officer
- Cyprian Broodbank (born 1964), British archaeologist and academic
- Cyprian Ekwensi (1921–2007), Nigerian author
- Cyprian Enweani (born 1964), Danish-Canadian runner
- Cyprian Fernandes (born 1943), Goan Kenyan journalist
- Cyprian Godebski (poet) (1765–1809), Polish poet
- Cyprian Godebski (sculptor) (1835–1909), Polish sculptor
- Cyprian Norwid (1821–1883), Polish poet, dramatist, painter, sculptor, and philosopher

== Churches ==
- Basilica of Saint-Cyprien, in Carthage
- St Cyprian's Cathedral, Kimberley, an Anglican cathedral in South Africa
- St Cyprian's, Clarence Gate, an Anglican church in London
- St Cyprian's Church, Sneinton, an Anglican church in Nottingham
- St Cyprian's Church, Hay Mills, an Anglican church in Birmingham
- St Cyprian's Church, Lenzie
- St. Cyprian's African Methodist Episcopal Church in San Francisco, California
- St. Cyprian Church, an African-American Catholic church in Columbus, Ohio which was closed in 1958.

== Schools ==
- St Cyprian's School, Cape Town, a school in South Africa
- St Cyprian's Grammar School, Kimberley, a school in South Africa
- St Cyprian's School, a school in England

== Other uses ==
- Cyprianus (collection of spells), Scandinavian folklore
- Aphrodite, a goddess in Greek mythology occasionally called Cyprian ('from Cyprus'), particularly in poetry

== See also ==
- Ciprian, a given name
- Kyprianos
- Cypriot (disambiguation)
- Saint-Cyprien (disambiguation), various places
- Pseudo-Cyprian, works falsely ascribed to Cyprian
