= Joan Terès i Borrull =

Spanish bishop

- Archbishop of Tarragona, Spain
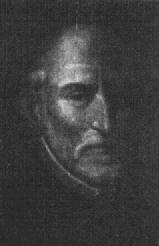
- Church: Catholic Church
- Appointed: 22 May 1587
- Term ended: 10 July 1603
- Predecessor: Antonio Agustín y Albanell
- Successor: Juan Vich y Manrique de Lara
- Other post: Viceroy of Catalonia (1602-1603)
- Previous posts: Rector of the University of Valencia, Spain (1570); Bishop of Morocco, Spain (1575-1579); Rector of the University of Tarragona, Spain (1577-1579); Bishop of Elne, Spain (1579-1586); Bishop of Tortosa, Spain (1586-1587)

Orders
- Ordination: 4 February 1975 by Gaspar Cervantes de Gaeta

Personal details
- Born: Joan Miquel Terès i Borrull; 29 September 1538 Verdú, Spain
- Died: 10 July 1603 (aged 64) Barcelona, Spain
- Buried: Tarragona Cathedral
- Denomination: Catholicism
- Residence: Palace of the Lieutenant
- Parents: Joan Terès Domènech; Magdalena Borrull Carnicer
- Education: University of Valencia
- Motto: Virtute Huius Omnia Teres
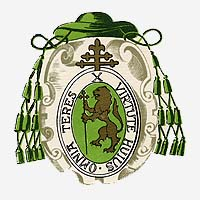
- Coat of arms

Joan Terès i Borrull (Note: His full name is Joan Miquel Terès i Borrull, although his first name has been referenced as Joan, Juan, Jean, Johan, Joannes or Johannes and his first family name as Terès, Terés, Térès or Teres.) (29 September 1538 – 10 July 1603) was presbyter of Vic, auxiliary bishop of Morocco (1575–1579), bishop of Elne (1579–1586) and of Tortosa (1586–1587), and archbishop of Tarragona (1587–1603). He was viceroy of Catalonia (1602–1603) and councillor of King Philip III of Spain.

== Early years ==
He was born in Verdú (Lleida, Spain) to a humble Christian family in 1538. (Note: However, Capeille, op. cit., p. 610, states that he was born in 1539.) Son of Joan Terès Domènech and Magdalena Borrull Carnicer, and brother of Magdalena, Joana, Elionor and Margarida.

During his teenage years, he lived in Reus, where he studied grammar while he begged to pay his studies. In 1554, he went to the School of Tarragona where he studied Latin and humanities, paying his studies with the short salary from delivering letters.

Due to his talent, he got good protection and stimulus. Later, he was sent to study philosophy and theology to a school that the Society of Jesus founded in Spain, the Saint Paul School in Valencia, where he finally completed his doctorate studies.

== Academic life ==
In 18 April 1566 he asked for a deferment to pay taxes for his doctorate in theology, which was granted. It is very probable that he passed in his first try, since there are no other registered deferments in the following years. Since 1532, the payment to get the title of doctor was 7 pounds and 10 sous (or 1 800 dineros). (Note: 1 Valencian pound = 20 sous; 1 sou = 12 dineros.)

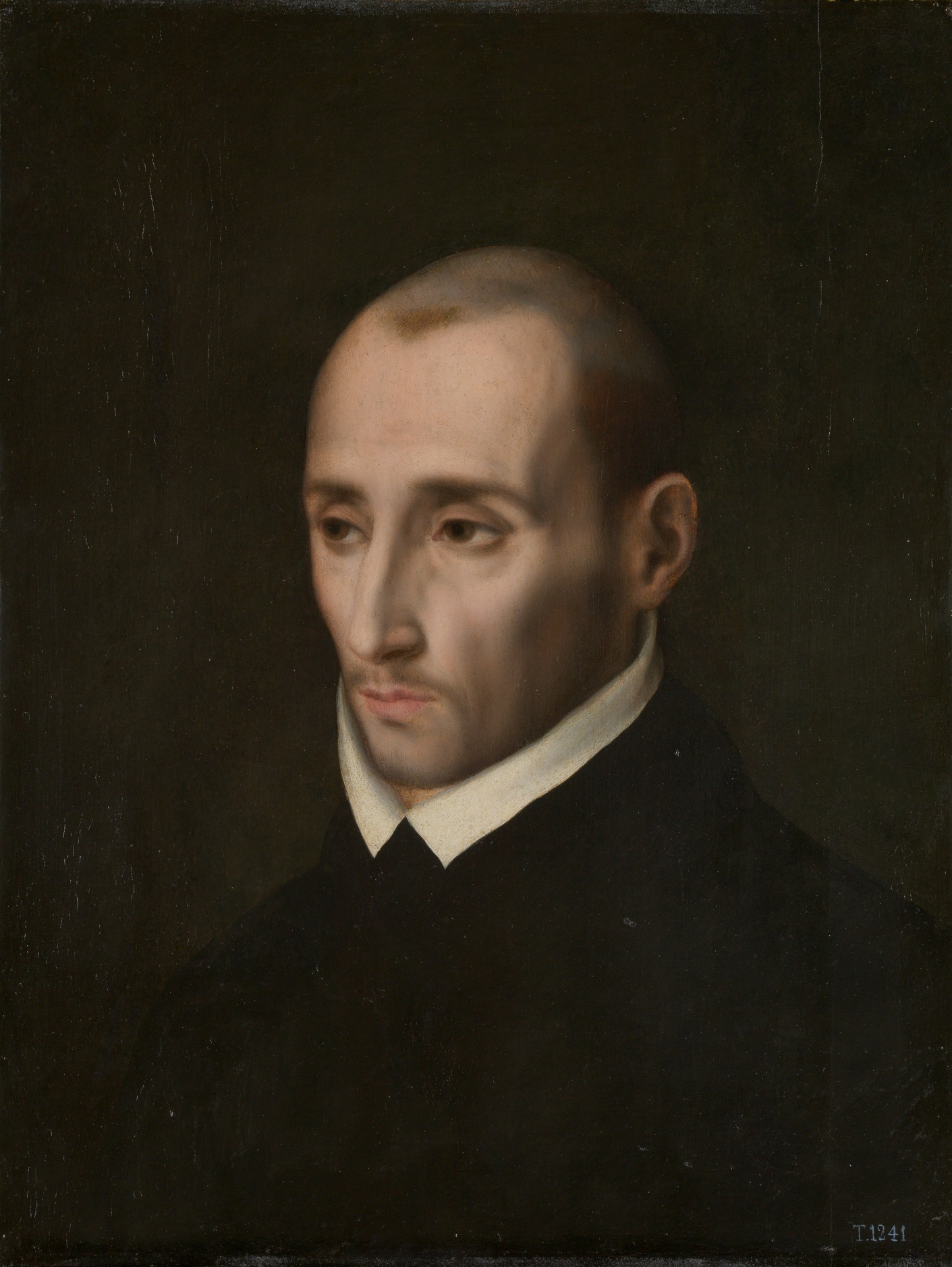
Archbishop of Valencia Juan de Ribera appointed Joan Terès as rector of the University of Valencia.

During the 1566–1567 academic year he was permanent professor of the second chair of Logic and for that he received 5 Valencian pounds out of the 500 that Pope Pius IV gave to the Studium generale of Valencia. On 15 March 1567 he was proposed for the second chair of Questions for the 1567–1568 academic year. In 1570-1571 he got the first chair of Questions and in 1571-1572 the first one of Philosophy. Logic, Questions and Philosophy, either in their realist or nominalist perspective, made up the Arts triad at the Faculty of Arts in cycles of three years. Professors usually taught a full triad starting with Logic in any of the modalities. Once finished either the nominalist or the realist cycle, they started with the one which they had not read before. For this reason, although there is evidence that Terès was chair in the mentioned courses, it is highly probable that he also took the second chair (nominalist) of Philosophy in 1568-1569 and the first chair (realist) of Logic in 1569–1572. Therefore, he would have completed a six-year period as a chair in the Faculty of Arts from 1566 until 1572.

Besides being professor, Joan Terès was examiner at the Faculty of Arts of the University of Valencia as well. In 16 February 1565 he was named assistant professor and substitute for examiner Vicente Montañés, chair at the Faculty of Arts. Usually, the assistant replaced the examiner in case of death or resignation. Nowhere is stated that Terès got the position, but there is evidence that Juan Tomás was proposed as his assistant in 5 July 1571. Two years later, in 4 March 1573, Terès, who was already living in Tarragona, resigned the position and Juan Tomás was replaced by Juan Tomás.

Due to the order of imprisonment of the rector of the University of Valencia for 1568–1571, Pere Joan Monzó, by archbishop of Valencia Juan de Ribera, in 31 March 1570, Terès was appointed new rector, when the archbishop forced Monzó to delegate his position to Terès.

The archbishop's original plans were to give the positions of chair of theology to members of the order he belonged to: the Society of Jesus. Since the rector was elected among the chairs of the Faculty of Theology by sortition and he had a vital role in the appointment of the rest of the academic positions, it would not be surprising that in a short time the Jesuits had taken control over the institution.

Therefore, it is understandable that the chosen one to replace Pere Monzó was somebody who had a similar academic qualification to be elected rector, and had the advantage of being a former student of the Jesuit School of Saint Paul.

In regard of his intellectual legacy, it is worth mentioning that he was the professor of the Spanish philosopher Diego Mas, who dedicated two of his works to Terès:

- Metaphysica disputatio seu de ente et de eius propietatibus, quae communi nomine scribitur de trascendentibus (Valencia, 1587)
- Commentaria in Universam Philosophia Aristotelis, una cum quaestionibus quae a gravissimis viris disputari solent (Valencia, 1599)

== Early ecclesiastical career ==
He went back to Tarragona and hold a benefice at the cathedral of Tarragona that allowed him to live without economical problems.

In 1570, the archbishop of Tarragona Gaspar Cervantes de Gaeta was appointed cardinal, keeping his position as archbishop of Tarragona. When he moved to Italy, Terès took care of the ecclesial matters of the archdiocese.

On 4 February 1575, Terès was consecrated by Archbishop Cervantes. That year the Seminary of Tarragona, the first one in Spain, was founded according to the regulations of the Council of Trent. Terès was its first rector. Later that year, Cardinal Cervantes proposed him to be auxiliary bishop with the nominal title of Morocco, with which the Pope agreed.

In 1577, the University of Tarragona was officially institutionalized, and in 2 May of that year Terès was appointed rector of that university by Archbishop Antonio Agustín. He also was chair of Theology at the new institution.

In 22 May 1579, Pope Gregory XIII sent him to the diocese of Elne, since the previous bishop, Pedro Mártir Coma, died. Terès took up the post in 26 July of that year. In 12 December 1582, Maria of Austria, widow of Maximilian II, Holy Roman Emperor, who was going back to Spain, and her daughter Margaret arrived to Collioure. When they stopped in Elne, Terès visited the Empress. In Christmas day, Terès celebrated a mass in the church of Saint John of Perpignan, in the presence of the Holy Roman Empress, the Princess and the whole court. In the second semester of 1585, Terès participated in the Courts of Monzón. In early June 1586, he received the nomination bulls from Pope Sixtus V for the diocese of Tortosa. As bishop of Tortosa, he consecrated the parochial temple of Verdú on 15 June 1586. In 22 May 1587, Pope Sixtus V assigned him to the archdiocese of Tarragona, after the death of archbishop Antonio Agustín.

== Archbishop of Tarragona ==
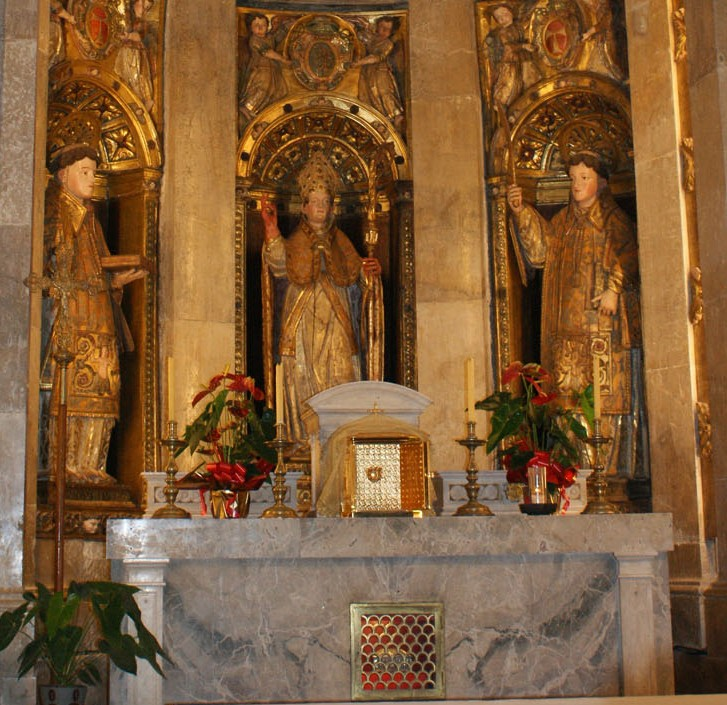
Archbishop Terès commanded the construction of the chapel of Saint Fructuosus of the Tarragona Cathedral to Pere Blai.

As archbishop, Terès founded the monastery of Saint Dominic in Ciutadilla, in 1588. He collaborated in the improvements of the monastery of Saint Mary of Bovera in Guimerà, and in the hermitage of Saint Magí of Brufaganya, near Santa Coloma de Queralt.

In 1589, he got for Tarragona the publication of the privilege of Studium Generale, granted by Philip II of Spain. This was celebrated with rejoicing and public festivities all around the city.

In 1591, Terès granted privileges of baptismal fonts to la Riba, due to the difficulty that represented for the villagers to go to Vilaverd.

In 1592, Terès ordered to build, in the cathedral of Tarragona, the chapels of Saint John the Evangelist and Saint Fructuosus, to the Renaissance architect Pere Blai.

In 13 August of that same year, Pope Clement VIII approved a Papal bull decreeing the annulment and secularization of the regular canons of the Order of Saint Augustine in all the monasteries and priories of Catalonia, Roussillon and Cerdanya, due to the dissolute life style of some communities of that order. The pope commissioned the execution of the bull to the archbishop of Tarragona, the bishop od Urgel Andreu Capella (who was Terès's professor in theology) and the Apostolic Nuncio to Spain Pietro Millino. Later, archbishop Terès sent his nephew and vicar general of the archdiocese of Tarragona, Antoni Clarassó i Terès, to read the bull to the canons gathered in Solsona. From that moment on, they were left secularized and deprived of the canonical insignias.

While some monasteries had complied with the order of secularization, the monastery of Saint Mary of Solsona resisted, basing their reasons on the second Papal bull in which Clement VIII stated that if the canons demonstrated an exemplary behavior, they could continue enjoying their position and benefice. The budget of the secularized monasteries went to Solsona. Then, the Solsonians addressed to King Philip II to create a new diocese, with Solsona as the Episcopal see, using the new extended income and the monastery as a residence. Once the pope agreed with the king's petition, Philip II informed of the approval of the Pope, and granted the ranked of city in 13 June 1594.

The creation of the diocese of Solsona caused serious unrest among the neighbouring dioceses because they saw their possessions diminished, especially in Urgel. Terès, the bishop of Urgell and the new Apostolic Nuncio Camillo Caetani were commissioned to erect the new diocese. After examining the life style and habits of the regular canons and declaring them free of guilt, they sent personal decrees to all of them, granting them the rights and benefice for their lifetime. Finally, Terès took part in the formation of the cathedral chapter, and later, in the delimitation of the new diocese, together with the abbot of Poblet and President of Catalonia Francesc Oliver de Boteller.

In 18 September 1594, Terès travelled on board, escorted by eight galleys, to the island of Ibiza, then territory of the archdiocese of Tarragona. During the trip, the expedition was assaulted by three Muslim pirate galleys. Finally, the archbishop's galleys took over two pirate ships.

He protected several orders of friars, like the Capuchins, the Augustinians and the Carmelites, and he notably improved the monastery of the Jesuits. While being archbishop he celebrated and presided the provincial ecumenical councils of 1587, 1591–92, 1598 y 1602.

On 4 April 1596, Terès proceeded to the recognition ceremony of the sepulcher of the Blessed Raymond of Penyafort, who later Terès promoted his canonization, by archbishop Terès, the bishop of Barcelona, Joan Dimas Loris, and the bishop of Vic, Pere Jaume, all three commissioned by Pope Clement VIII. There were also present the bishop of Elne, Francesc Robuster i Sala, the recently appointed first bishop of Solsona, Lluís Sanç i Manegat, and the deputies of Catalonia and consuls of Barcelona. Terès also promoted the beatification of the founder of the Society of Jesus, Ignatius of Loyola.

In 1602, the petronel-armed bandits Pere Voltor and Miquel Català killed Royal commissioner Epifani Olives i Terès, the archbishop's nephew, in the Castle of Valls. The jurors of Valls and many prominent authorities of the city were declared accomplices by the Royal Audience of Catalonia. This made the relations between the authorities of Valls and Terès very tense.

Terès alerted the bishops not to tolerate preaching in languages other than their mother tongue. He also promoted the art of printing in Tarragona.

== Viceroy of Catalonia ==
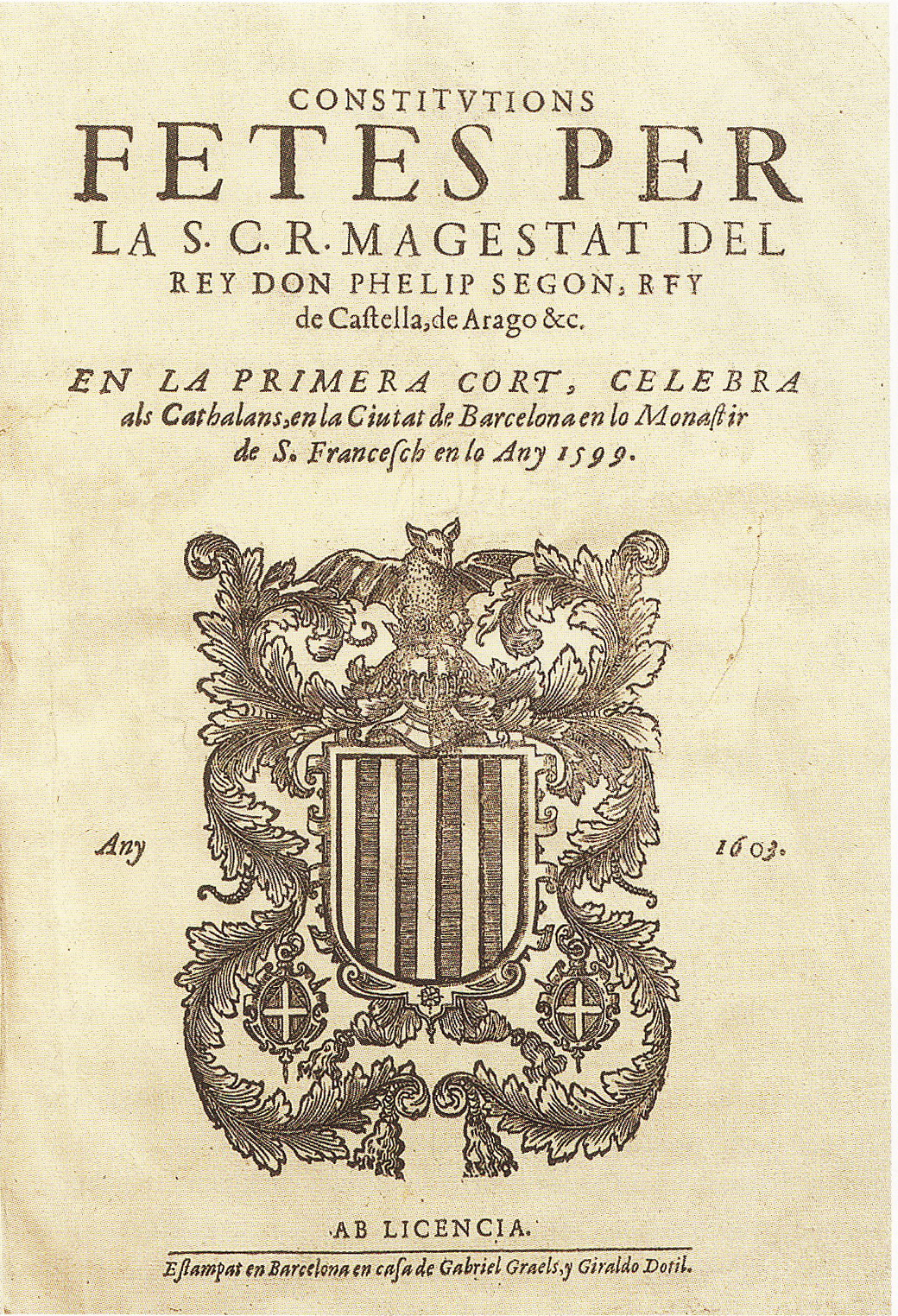
Viceroy Terès published in 1603 the Constitutions of the Catalan Courts celebrated in Barcelona in 1599.

In 1599, the King Philip III of Spain attended a session at the Catalan Courts. Terès, still archbishop, presided the ecclesiastical arm. After every session, the agreements achieved were usually printed, but that time there were five articles with which the deputies could not come to an agreement. Among them, the right of the viceroy to make proclamations and the deprivation for nobles and their servants of carrying petronels, in order to suppress banditry in Catalonia.

The then viceroy of Catalonia, Lorenzo Suárez de Figueroa y Córdoba, duke of Feria, interpreted the protest as an act of disobedience and replied ordering the imprisonment of a deputy and the Courts comptroller. This event was the reason why the duke was thrown out of charge. On 16 April 1602, he was replaced by Terès.

The highly delicate circumstances drove Philip III to assign Terès as a mean of appeasement. He was well known by the king from his assistantship at the Courts in 1599. Moreover, that same year, the king and his wife Margaret of Austria stayed at the Archbishop's Palace of Tarragona for three days.

At the end of 1602, one of the murderers of Terès's nephew, Pere Voltor, was captured in a raid. Later that year he was sentenced to death and chopped into pieces.

Terès decreed the release of the deputies imprisoned by the duke of Feria and published the Constitutions without the conflictive articles. He was strongly opposed to the manufacture of petronels, especially in a country where in just one year more than 300 people were killed by this firearm. Finally he decided to face the nobles.

In 1603, Terès prohibited the production of petronels to the blacksmiths. This move did not prove satisfactory to the deputies and bothered the aristocracy. When another protest came up, Terès offered to study this matter again.

As viceroy, Terès, who was openly a nyerro, actively took part in the disputes between nyerros and cadells, thus disregarding the obligations of his position.

The viceroy, without political ambitions and impatient to return to his ecclesiastical tasks, asked for a replacement. King Philip III accepted his petition and on 19 May 1603 he designated the duke of Monteleone, Ettore Pignatelli e Colonna, as the new viceroy.

== Death and legacy ==
Before transferring the powers to the next viceroy, archbishop Terès died on 10 July 1603 (Note: However, Boleda i Cases (1982), op. cit., p. 19, mentions two other possible dates of death, 6 and 16 July.) in the Palace of the Lieutenant, in Barcelona, at age 64. Although the causes of his death were not clear, it has been rumored that he had been poisoned. His testimonial executor was his nephew Antoni Clarassó i Terès.

In 1610, his remains were taken and escorted by the Spanish squad to Tarragona, and finally buried between the chapels of Saint Fructuosus and Saint John, where he always had his confessional.

His altruist character was perpetuated by a pious foundation for unmarried ladies of his lineage. He left money for school fees at the Seminary of Tarragona, for poor students of his lineage and from la Selva del Camp. He still left more for other seven poor students that wanted to take the ecclesiastical path, with preference for natives from Verdú. And finally, another foundation for provide money annually to three chosen girls from Tarragona, la Selva del Camp and Constantí.

He was also remembered as the benefactor of two orphanages, for boys and girls, in Tarragona since, at least, 1551.

Archbishop Terès street in Verdú (Spain) is named after him.

== Notes ==
Academic offices
Preceded by Pere Joan Monzó	Rector of the University of Valencia; 1570	Succeeded by Pere Joan Monzó
Preceded by New creation	Rector of the University of Tarragona; 1577–1579	Succeeded by Pedro Torrens
Catholic Church titles
Preceded by Sebastián de Obregón	Bishop of Morocco; 1575–1579	Succeeded by Miguel Espinosa
Preceded by Pedro Mártir Coma	Bishop of Elne; 1579–1586	Succeeded by Pedro Bonet Santamaría
Preceded by Juan Izquierdo	Bishop of Tortosa; 1586–1587	Succeeded by Joan Baptista Cardona
Preceded by Antonio Agustín	Archbishop of Tarragona; 1587–1603	Succeeded by Juan Vich y Manrique de Lara
Political offices
Preceded by Lorenzo Suárez de Figueroa y Córdoba	Viceroy of Catalonia; 1602–1603	Succeeded by Ettore de Pignatelli e Colonna
