= Cyprian of Tarragona =

Cyprian (Latin: Cyprianus; Catalan: Cebrià; Spanish: Cipriano) was the metropolitan bishop of Tarragona in the years 683–688, although the exact dates of his episcopate are unknown. By 1300, he was venerated as a saint in Tarragona Cathedral. His original epitaph is preserved but his bones are lost.

== Episcopate ==
There is no secure record of the bishop of Tarragona after Protasius in 646 until the first mention of Cyprian in 683. Two bishops of uncertain date, Faluax and George, have sometimes been placed in this interim.

Cyprian is documented through the attendance of his delegates at three church councils in Toledo. He never attended in person. In 683, he was represented at the Thirteenth Council of Toledo by his archdeacon Ispasand. In 684, the abbot Argebad and the presbyter Vitalian represented him at the Fourteenth Council of Toledo. The archpriest and abbot Sesald attended on his behalf the Fifteenth Council of Toledo in 688. There is no record of him later than that. His successor, Vera, signed the canons of the Sixteenth Council of Toledo in 693, indicating that Cyprian was dead by then. It is unknown if Cyprian or Vera convoked the Council of Zaragoza of 691.

The titles of Cyprian's delegates demonstrate that the diocese of Tarragona possessed a full ecclesiastical hierarchy in his time and that the monasteries did not operate independently of the bishop. María Dolores del Amo hypothesises that Cyprian's absence from all three councils was owing to local troubles stemming from the suppression of the rebellion of Flavius Paulus and perhaps the famines recorded in 680 and 687.

== Relics and veneration ==
By the end of the 13th century, Cyprian was venerated locally as a saint. On 8 September 1303, Archbishop Roderic Tello ordered that his remains be reintererd in front of the main altar devoted to Saint Thecla. In 1460, under Archbishop Pero de Urrea, his remains were placed in an alabaster ossuary made by Maurici Muntanya. Lluís Pons d'Icart records in 1572 that this was placed in a niche in the wall behind the altar. It was opened and inspected in 1643 and in 1976. It contains the following epitaph:

☩ Hic · requíescit · uir s[anc]tissimus / Cyprianus · prim[a]e · sedis Terrach- / one[n]sis ciuitatis ep[iscop]us · d[e]positu^{s} / est i[n] hu[n]c tumulu[m] · octauo k[a]l[end]as / maias in pace

Translation:

☩ Here rests a most holy man, Cyprian, bishop of the primatial see of the city of Tarragona, laid in this tomb the eight day before the kalends of May in peace.

Although the epitaph was carved when the ossuary was made in 1460, it is probably a copy of the original epitaph from the late 7th century. This would originally have been either carved into the floor or laid out in mosaic.

In 2019, a group of scholars examined the bones in the ossuary and found that they could not be those of Cyprian. In fact, the bones belong to four different individuals, including a youth and a woman. They date to the 5th–6th centuries. The researchers hypothesise that the remains, buried in the original cathedral, were discovered during the construction of the medieval cathedral, incorrectly identified on the basis of Cyprian's epitaph and removed for safekeeping, later to be given their own ossuary with the transferred epitaph.

== Bibliography ==
- Del Amo Guinovart, María Dolores (2001). "Obispos y eclesiásticos de Tarraco desde los inicios del cristianismo a la invasión sarracena del 711 dC". Butlletí Arqueològic. 23: 259–280.
- Gómez Pallarès, Joan; Muñoz Melgar, Andreu (2017). "Cyprianus episcopus Tarraconensis and His Interment". Epigraphica. 74: 321–337.
- Mánguez Tomás, Andrés (2023). "La Archiepiscoporum Tarraconensium Nomina en época tardoantiqua según el ms. 2610 de la Biblioteca Universitaria de Salamanca: Una Nueva Revisión". Hispania Sacra. 75 (152): 289–297.
- Muñoz Melgar, Andreu (2001). El cristianisme a l'antiga Tarragona: Dels orígens a la incursió islámica. Institut Superior de Ciències Religioses Sant Fructuós, Arquebisbat de Tarragona.
- Muñoz Melgar, Andreu; Gómez Pallarès, Joan; Armentano Oller, Núria (2019). "Avances en el estudio de la arqueta-osario dedicada al obispo Cipriano de Tarragona. Estudio de los restos antropológicos y su interpretación en contexto". Archivo Español de Arqueología. 92: 271–286.
