= Ciprian =

Ciprian is a given or family name. Notable people with the name include:

== Given name ==
- Cyprian, bishop of Carthage
- Ciprian Brata (born 1991), Romanian footballer
- Ciprian Danciu (born 1977), Romanian football player and the manager of FC Baia Mare
- Ciprian Deac (born 1986), Romanian professional footballer
- Ciprian Dianu (born 1977), Romanian football player
- Ciprian Dinu (born 1982), Romanian footballer
- Ciprian Foias (1933–2020), Romanian-American mathematician
- Ciprian Manolescu (born 1978), Romanian mathematician
- Ciprian Marica (born 1985), Romanian footballer
- Ciprian Milea (born 1984), Romanian football player
- Ciprian Petre (born 1980), Romanian football player
- Ciprian Popa (born 1980), Romanian sprint canoeist who has competed since 2005
- Ciprian Porumbescu (1853–1883), Romanian composer
- Ciprian Prodan (born 1979), Romanian footballer
- Ciprian Suciu (born 1987), Romanian football player
- Ciprian Tănasă (born 1981), Romanian football player
- Ciprian Tătărușanu (born 1986), Romanian footballer
- Ciprian Vasilache (born 1983), Romanian football midfielder

== Family name ==
- George Ciprian (1883–1968), Romanian actor and playwright
- Ingrid Ciprian-Matthews, American journalist and television producer

== See also ==
- 1932 San Ciprian hurricane, powerful Atlantic tropical cyclone that struck Puerto Rico in the 1932 Atlantic hurricane season
- Ciprian Porumbescu, Suceava, commune located in Suceava County, Romania
- George Ciprian Theatre, theatre in Buzău, Romania, that opened in 1995 under the patronage of Paul Ioachim
- Cyprianus, Latin form of the same name
