= Berenguer de Vilademuls =

Catalan archbishop

Berenguer de Vilademuls (died 16 February 1194) was the Archbishop of Tarragona from 1174 until his assassination. He was the sixth bishop after the re-founding of the diocese in 1118. His predecessor, Hug de Cervelló, had been assassinated in 1171. Tarragona was in an internationally ambiguous position in Berenguer's time, between the Kingdom of France on the one side, the traditional suzerain of the Catalan counties, and the Crown of Aragon on the other, which had acquired the Catalan counties in the 12th century. In 1180 a council was convened in Tarragona that declared that thenceforth documents should be dated by the year of the Incarnation rather than in the traditional way, by the regnal year of the French kings.

In 1178, Berenguer arbitrated a dispute between King Alfonso II of Aragon and Berenguer de Fluvià over rights at the castle of Forès. He supervised for a time the comital administration in the counties of Roussillon and Cerdagne on behalf of Alfonso II, who was also count there. He was perhaps also in charge of the coinage of Catalonia in 1182–85.

== Assassination ==
Berenguer was assassinated by a relative, Guillem Ramon I de Montcada, his niece's husband. In a letter to the suffragans of Tarragona, Pope Celestine III detailed the crime, especially heinous because proprius homo fuisset archiepiscopi, "he was the archbishop's man", i.e. vassal. The assassination was part of an ongoing dispute between two Catalan factions. In 1190, in a sirventes, "Un sirventes ai en cor a bastir", the troubadour Guillem de Berguedà accused the king of not accepting him into his company in order to please the archbishop of Tarragona. By that time Berenguer "appeared in the eyes of the partisans of the Cabrera–Castellbò band as the principal inspiration in royal politics."

No action, either by the king or by the clergy was taken against Guillem Ramon for ten months after the murder. But at that point he went into exile. He did not return until he inherited the viscounty of Béarn from his brother, Gaston VI, in 1214. In September 1215 he prepared his will and then went to Rome to seek absolution. Pope Innocent III delegated his case to three cardinals—Nicholas of Tusculum, Pelayo of Albano and Ugolino of Ostia—who imposed a strict penance on him.
