= Pere Blai =

Spanish architect

Pere Blai (1553–1621) was a Spanish architect.

He possibly studied under his father, master of the fountains in Barcelona and his brother. He was in relationship with Jaume Amigó, influenced Blai's knowledge of Renaissance architecture and led to his appointment as building master of the diocese of Tarragona.

His works include the Chapel of the Holiest in the Cathedral of Tarragona (1582), in which he succeeded Bernat Cassany; the parish church in La Selva del Camp (1582); the chapels of St. John and St. Fructuous in the Cathedral of Tarragona (1592); parish church of Cornudella de Montsant (1599); and the parish church of the Apostle James at Riudoms (1617).

In 1565, Lluís d'Icard commissioned him the construction of the Palace-Castle of Torredembarra, and example of Catalan Renaissance architecture. He also designed the southern façade of the Palau de la Generalitat de Catalunya in Barcelona.
