= Epifani Olives i Terès =

Epifani Olives i Terès (Note: He has also been referenced as Epifanio Terés.) (died 1602) was a Royal commissioner of King Philip III of Spain and nephew of archbishop of Tarragona and viceroy of Catalonia Joan Terès i Borrull.

== Knighthood ==
At the Courts session celebrated in 1599 in Barcelona, Olives was knighted and received nobility privileges by King Philip III.

== Death ==
In 1602, Olives was in Valls, a city reigned by the terror caused by the confrontations between the factions of the voltors and the morells. Two voltor leaders, Pere Voltor and Miquel Català infiltrated into the Castle of Valls and killed the Royal commissioner with petronels in the castle's courtyard. The jurors of Valls and many prominent authorities of the city were declared accomplices by the Royal Audience of Catalonia. This made the relations between the authorities of Valls and the archdiocese of Tarragona, ruled by his uncle, very tense. Later that year, when his uncle was appointed viceroy of Catalonia, Pere Voltor was captured, sentenced and executed by being cut into pieces. A year later, his uncle prohibited the production of petronels to the blacksmiths.

== Personal life ==
His father was Francesch Olives and his mother Margarida Terès i Borrull, sister of archbishop and viceroy Joan Terès i Borrull.
