= Archdiocese of Tarragona =

Roman Catholic territory in Catalonia, Spain

Coordinates: 41°07′09″N 1°15′29″E

Archdiocese of Tarragona Archidioecesis Tarraconensis Arxidiòcesi de Tarragona (ca) Archidiócesis de Tarragona (es)

Catholic
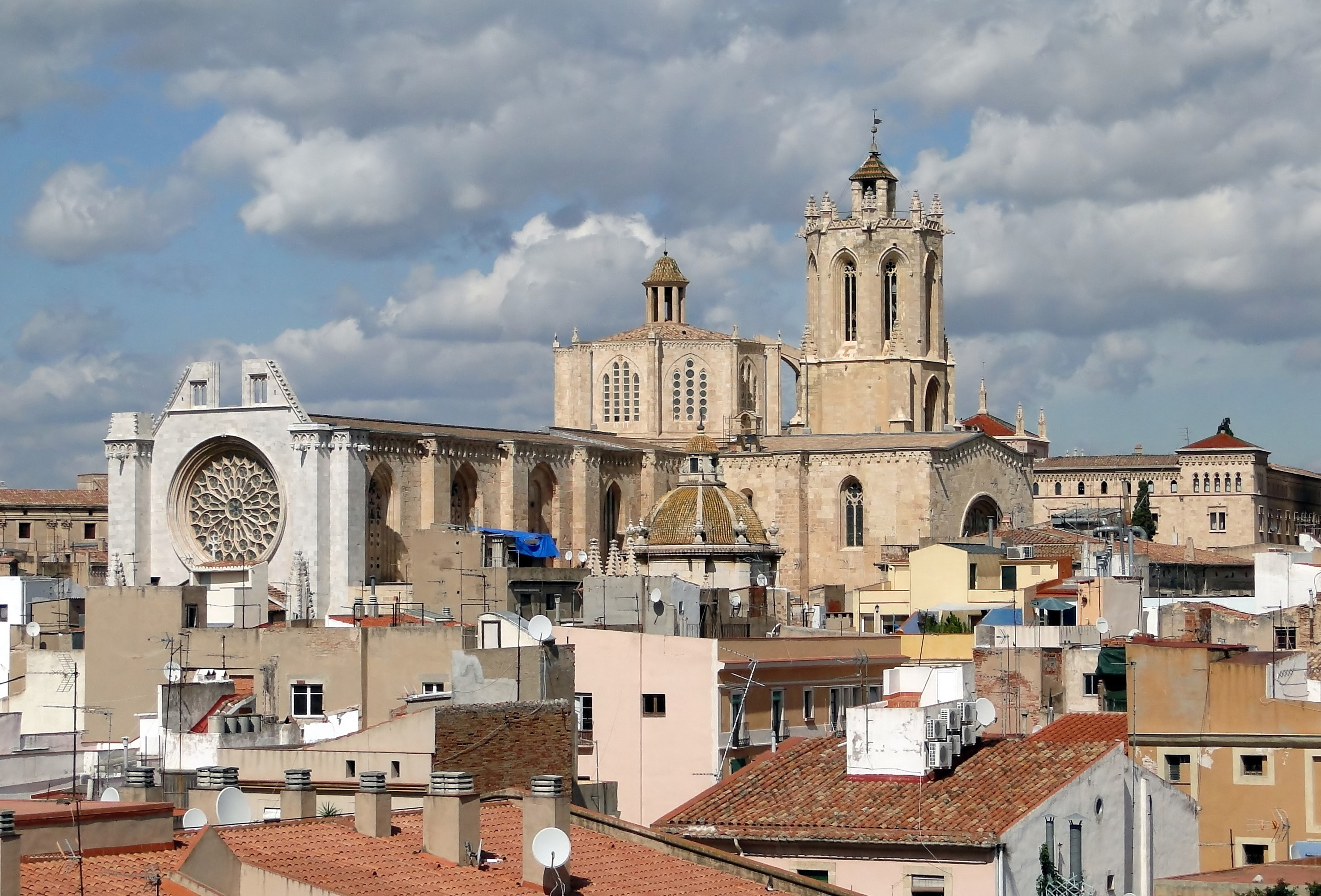
- Tarragona Cathedral

Location
- Country: Spain
- Ecclesiastical province: Tarragona

Statistics
- Area: 3,146 km^{2} (1,215 sq mi)
- Population: Total; Catholics: (as of 2010); 549,500; 517,800 (94.2%)

Information
- Denomination: Catholic
- Sui iuris church: Latin Church
- Rite: Roman Rite
- Established: 1st Century (As Diocese of Tarragona); 5th Century (As Archdiocese of Tarragona)
- Cathedral: Primatial Cathedral Basilica of St Mary in Tarragona

Current leadership
- Pope: Leo XIV
- Metropolitan Archbishop: Joan Planellas i Barnosell
- Suffragans: Diocese of Girona; Diocese of Lleida; Diocese of Solsona; Diocese of Tortosa; Diocese of Urgell; Diocese of Vic

Map
- The Archdiocese of Tarragona in red.

Website
- arquebisbattarragona.cat

The Archdiocese of Tarragona (Latin: Archidioecesis Tarraconensis) is a Latin Church ecclesiastical territory located in north-eastern Spain, in the province of Tarragona, part of the autonomous community of Catalonia. The incumbent Metropolitan Archbishop also bears the title Primate of Spain and heads the ecclesiastical province of Tarragona, having Metropolitan authority over the suffragan dioceses of Girona, Lleida, Solsona, Tortosa, Urgell and Vic.

The archdiocese, created in Roman times, was reestablished in 1118 after the Muslim occupation.

== History ==
=== Roman period (until the 5th century) ===
Tarragona is one of the most ancient cities of Spain, probably of Iberian origin, as its coins and Cyclopean walls indicate.

The Romans selected Tarragona as the centre of their government in Spain. In the division of the peninsula it was the capital first of Hispania Citerior (Hither Spain) and then of the Province of Hispania Tarraconensis.

The Church of Tarragona is traditionally held to have received visits from James and Paul.

The earliest surviving written testimony concerning the bishops of Tarragona is the third-century Acts of the Martyrdom of the bishop St. Fructuosus and his deacons Augurius and Eulogius.

The see of Tarragona, which was vacant at that time, was represented at the Council of Arles (314) by two procurators, the priest Probatius and the deacon Castorius. Himerius, who sent the priest Basianus to Pope Damasus I, and who obtained a letter from Pope Siricius, was Archbishop of Tarragona in 384.

It is also conjectured that the Hilarius who was the subject of the Decretal issued by Pope Innocent I was also a Bishop of Tarragona. Ascanio was bishop in 465.

In the fifth century Tarragona was overrun by the Vandals, Suevi, and Alani.

=== Visigoth period (5th to 7th centuries) ===
The Visigothic king, Euric, took possession of Tarragona in 475 and totally demolished it. During the occupation of the Visigoths it flourished once more.

On 6 November 516, Archbishop John assembled all the bishops of his province and held the first provincial council of Tarragona, at which ten bishops were present. In 517 he assembled another provincial council in Girona.

Sergius, who was bishop from 535 to 546, held councils in Barcelona and Lleida (546). Justus, Bishop of Urgel, dedicated to him his commentary on the Song of Solomon. Tranquillinus was bishop for many years previous to 560. He had been a monk in the Monastery of Asana, under the direction of Victornus.

Artemius, bishop prior to 589, was not able to attend the Third Council of Toledo (589), but sent a substitute, Stephen. He called provincial councils at Zaragoza (599) and Barcelona.

Eusebius (610–632) held the council of Egara (Terrassa) to enforce the canons of the Council of Huesca. Audax (633–638) was present at the Fourth Council of Toledo (633), and Protasius (637–646) at the Sixth (638) and Seventh (646) Councils of Toledo. Cyprianus (680–688) sent representatives to the Thirteenth (683), Fourteenth (684), and Fifteenth (688) councils of Toledo. Vera assisted personally at the Sixteenth (693) and Seventeenth (694).

=== Muslim period (c. 719 – 1116) ===
In time of Vera or in that of his successor, George, the Muslim invasion took place. The Arabs destroyed Tarragona in 719.

Louis the Pious appears to have temporarily taken possession of the city. A portion of its territory was bestowed on the Bishop of Barcelona, and the metropolitan rank was given to the Bishop of Narbonne, but was recovered in 759.

Caesarius endeavoured to obtain recognition as titular Archbishop of Tarragona, but was not successful, although he was consecrated by the bishops of Leon and Galicia, and obtained from the pope the abbey of Santa Cecilia, which belonged to the Archbishop of Tarragona.

Borrell, Count of Barcelona, induced Pope John XIII to confer the title of Archbishop of Tarragona on Atton, bishop of Vich in 957–971, although he never was called Archbishop of Tarragona but of Ausona.

Berengarius of Rosanes, Bishop of Vich in c. 1078–c. 1099, petitioned Pope Urban II for permission to promote a crusade for the reconquest of Tarragona. Count Berenguer Ramón II the Fratricide succeeded in taking the city and made it a fief of the Holy See. The pope, in recognition of the efforts of the Bishop of Vich, conferred on him the pallium as Archbishop of Tarragona, transferring to him all rights to the city and its churches which had previously belonged to the Holy See. The new bishop, however, was to remain in possession of the Church of Vich.

A similar concession was granted to Olegarius, Bishop of Barcelona in 1116–1137, who was permitted to retain possession of his former church until he had obtained complete and peaceful possession of that of Tarragona, of which he had been named Archbishop.

=== Archdiocese of Tarragona (since 1116) ===
It was not until 1116 that Tarragona was definitively reconquered by Ramón Berenguer III the Great. Bishop Berenguer had died in 1110, after having assisted, in 1096, at the Council of Nîmes convoked by Pope Urban II.

His successor in the See of Tarragona, Olegarius, had been a canon regular at St. Rufus in Provence, later an abbot, and then Bishop of Barcelona in 1116–1137. To him is due the restoration of the metropolitan authority of Tarragona. In 1117 Count Ramón Berenguer III conferred on him the government of the city that he might endeavour to recolonize it, which work he carried on with great zeal.

He assisted at the councils of Toulouse and Reims (1109), of the Lateran (1123), and of Clermont (1130), and accompanied the Count of Barcelona as pontifical legate in the war which terminated in the imposition of a tribute upon Tortosa and Lleida. The Norman Robert Burdet also joined the forces of the Count of Barcelona, established himself in Tarragona and obtained dominion over a great part of the city.

On the death of Olegarius (6 March 1137), Gregory, Abbot of Saint-Michel-de-Cuxa, succeeded him in the vacant See of Tarragona, and was the first incumbent of that see to receive the title of archbishop.

The dissensions among the sons of Robert Burdet led to the murder by them of Archbishop Hug de Cervelló 22 April 1171.

By special privilege of the pope, all the kings of Aragon were crowned at Zaragoza by the archbishop of Tarragona, until the metropolitan See of Zaragoza was re-established in 1318. The dissensions between the archbishops and the kings, on account of the jurisdiction over Tarragona granted to the bishops who had begun its resettlement, continued during the time of king Alfonso II of Aragon and I of Barcelona, who bestowed the city as a dowry on his wife, Sancha of Castile.

When king James I, a child of six years, took the oath, the Archbishop of Tarragona, Asparec de la Barca (1215–1233), carried him in his arms as one of James' four regents. Although he was far advanced in his years, he wished to accompany the king in his expedition to conquer Mallorca, and when James refused his consent, he contributed a thousand marks in gold and twelve hundred armed men. Archbishop Asparec also continued the repopulation of the province of Tarragona, initiated the use of the cathedral of Tarragona which was still under construction and sponsored the building of the Carthusian Scala Dei monastery in the Montsant region. Under his leadership the reform Council of Lleida was called to promote post-Lateran reforms though the reforms were met with some resistance.

In 1242 a provincial council was convoked at Tarragona to regulate the procedure of the Inquisition and canonical penances. In 1312 a provincial council was assembled in the Corpus Christi Chapel of the cathedral cloister, to pass sentence on the Templars, whom it declared innocent.

King Peter IV the Ceremonious, who, after forcibly seizing the dominions of the archbishop, repented in his last illness and restored to St.Tecla, patroness of the city, all that he had unjustly acquired.

Don Pedro Zagarriga, Archbishop of Tarragona in 1407–1418, was one of the arbitrators at the Compromise of Caspe (1412).

One of the most celebrated prelates of Tarragona, Antonio Agustín y Albanell (died 1586), a native of Zaragoza, was an eminent jurisconsult and numismatist. He put an end to the struggles referred to in Don Quixote, between the Narros and Cadells factions, which had disturbed the peace of Catalonia.

=== Modern times ===
In 1912 it was bounded on the north by Barcelona and Lleida, on the east by Barcelona, on the south by the Mediterranean Sea and Tortosa, and on the west by Tortosa. It comprised the civil Provinces of Tarragona and Lleida, and the city of Tarragona had 24,335 inhabitants. Its suffragans were Barcelona, Lleida, Girona, Urgell, Vic, Tortosa and Solsona.

== List of bishops ==
=== Metropolitan bishops of Tarragona (3rd century – c. 712) ===
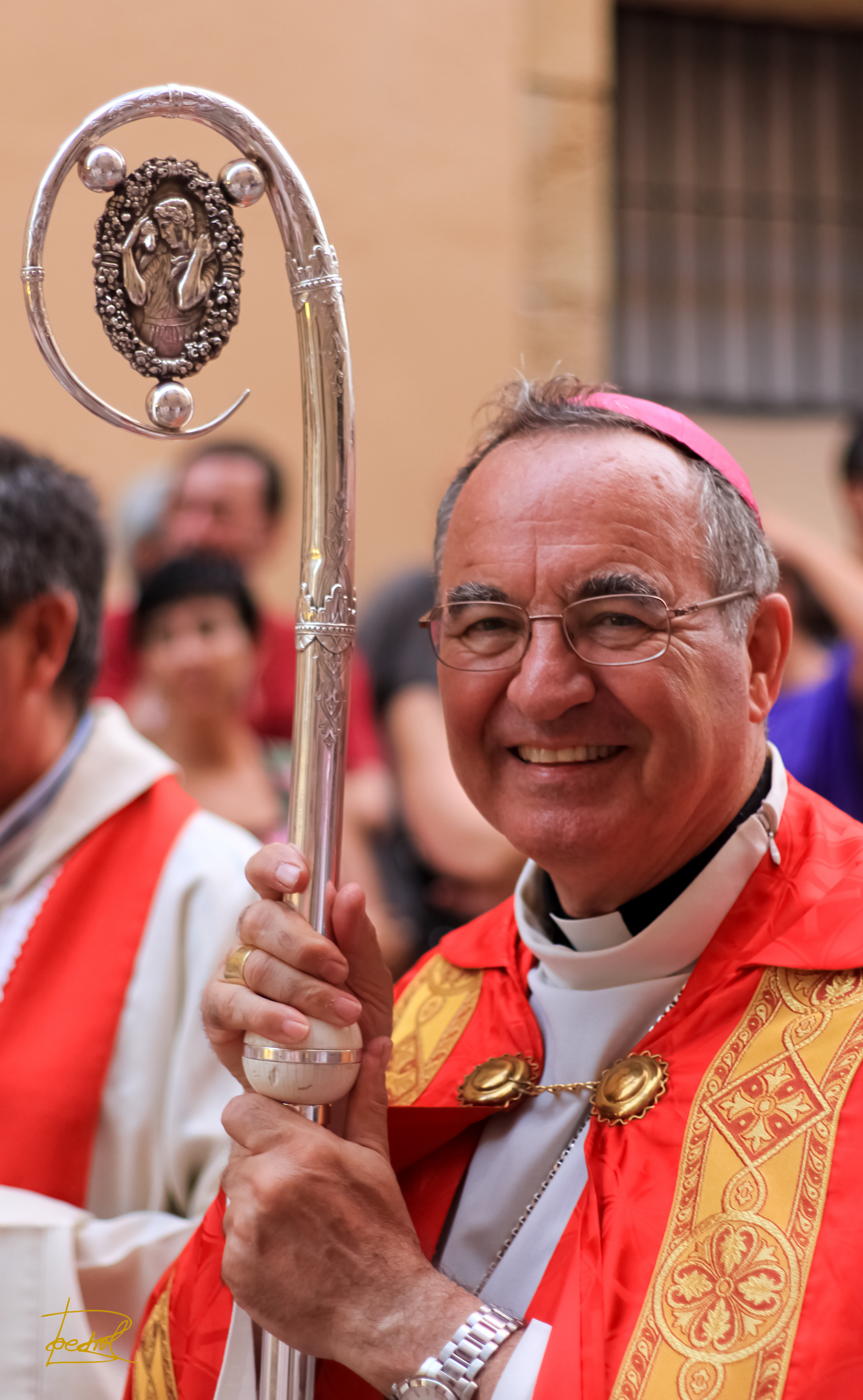
Archbishop Jaume Pujol Balcells

For this period, dates are those of first and last mention not necessarily the start and end of the episcopate.

- 259 : Fructuosus
- 385 : Himerius
- 419 : Titianus
- 465 : Ascanius
- ? 480s : Aemilianus
- 516–517 : John
- 540–546 : Sergius
- ? 560s–570s : Tranquilinus
- 589?–592 : Artemius
- 599 : Asiaticus
- 610–614 : Eusebius
- 633 : Audax
- 636 : Silva
- 638–646 : Protagius
- 683–688 : Cyprian
- 693–?694 : Vera

Several names of early bishops of Tarragona cannot be associated with any date. An early 17th century manuscript contains a list of bishops down to the Arab conquest of Spain (Archiepiscoporum Tarraconensium nomina ante Arabum et Maurorum in Hispania advenum) the ends with a set of names called incertus (uncertain). These are George, Prudentius, Aemilianus, Paternus, Idacius, Phaluax and Agnellus. The name Euphemius has sometimes been attached to the bishop who attended the Third Council of Toledo in 589. The name Prosper has also attached to the bishop at the time of the Arab conquest, although on weak grounds.

=== Bishops of Tarragona (8th to 11th centuries) ===
- 956–unknown : Caesarius
- 970–971 : Atton — (also bishop of Vich in 957–971)
- 1091–1099 : Berenguer Sunifred — (also bishop of Vich in c. 1078–c. 1099)

=== Archbishops of Tarragona (since 1118) ===
Count Ramón Berenguer III the Great took Tarragona in 1116.

1. 1118–1137 : Olegarius, Saint — (also bishop of Barcelona in 1116–1137)
2. 1143–1146 : Gregory
3. 1146–1163 : Bernardo Tort
4. 1163–1171 : Hugo de Cervelló — (also Hugo de Cervellón)
5. 1171–1174 : Guillermo de Torroja
6. 1174–1194 : Berenguer de Vilademuls
7. 1194–1198 : Ramón Xedmar de Castelltersol
8. 1199–1215 : Ramón de Rocabertí
9. 1215–1233 : Asparec de la Barca — (also Aspargo Barca)
10. 1235–1237 : Raymond of Penyafort, O.P.
11. 1237–1239 : Guillermo de Montgrí
12. 1238–1251 : Pedro de Albalat
13. 1251–1268 : Benito de Rocabertí
14. 1272–1287 : Bernardo de Olivella
15. 1288–1308 : Rodrigo Tello
16. 1309–1315 : Guillermo de Rocabertí
17. 1317–1327 : Jimeno Martínez de Luna y Aragón
18. 1327–1334 : Juan de Aragón
19. 1334–1346 : Arnaldo Sescomes
20. 1346–1357 : Sancho López de Ayerbe
21. 1357–1380 : Pedro Clasquerí
22. 1388–1407 : Eneco de Vallterra
23. 1407–1418 : Pedro de Sagarriga y Pau — (also Pedro Zagarriga)
24. 1419–1431 : Dalmacio de Mur y de Cervelló
25. 1431–1433 : Gonzalo Fernández de Hijar
26. 1434–1445 : Domingo Ram y Lanaja
27. 1445–1489 : Pedro de Urrea
28. 1490–1511 : Gonzalo Fernández de Heredia y de Bardají
29. 1512–1514 : Alfonso de Aragón y Sánchez
30. 1515–1530 : Pedro Folc de Cardona
31. 1531–1532 : Luis Folc de Cardona y Enríquez
32. 1533–1558 : Girolamo Doria
33. 1560–1567 : Fernando de Loaces y Pérez
34. 1567–1568 : Bartolomé Sebastián de Aroitia
35. 1568–1575 : Gaspar Cervantes de Gaeta
36. 1576–1586 : Antonio Agustín y Albanell
37. 1587–1603 : Joan Terès i Borrull
38. 1604–1611 : Juan de Vic y Manrique
39. 1613–1622 : Juan de Moncada y Gralla
40. 1624–1626 : Juan de Hoces
41. 1627–1633 : Juan Guzmán (archbishop)
42. 1633–1637 : Antonio Pérez (archbishop)
43. 1653–1663 : Francisco de Rojas y Artés
44. 1663–1679 : Juan Manuel de Espinosa y Manuel
45. 1680–1694 : José Sanchís y Ferrandis
46. 1695–1710 : José Llinás y Aznar
47. 1712–1719 : Isidoro de Beltrán
48. 1720–1721 : Miguel Juan de Taverner y Rubí
49. 1721–1728 : Manuel de Samaniego y Jaca
50. 1728–1753 : Pedro de Copons y Copons
51. 1753–1762 : Jaime de Cortada y Bru
52. 1763–1764 : Lorenzo Despuig y Cotoner
53. 1764–1777 : Juan Lario y Lanzis
54. 1779–1783 : Joaquín de Santiyán y Valdivielso
55. 1785–1803 : Francesc Armanyà i Font
56. 1804–1816 : Romualdo Mon y Velarde
57. 1818–1819 : Antonio Bergosa y Jordán
58. 1820–1825 : Jaime Creus Martí
59. 1826–1854 : Antonio Fernando de Echanove y de Zaldívar
60. 1857–1864 : José Domingo Costa y Borrás
61. 1864–1870 : Francisco Fleix y Solans
62. 1875–1878 : Constantino Boney y Zanuy
63. 1879–1888 : Benito Vilamitjana y Vila
64. 1889–1911 : Tomás Costa y Fornaguera
65. 1913–1918 : Antolín López Peláez
66. 1919–1943 : Francisco Vidal y Barraquer
67. 1944–1948 : Manuel Arce y Ochotorena
68. 1949–1970 : Benjamín de Arriba y Castro
69. 1970–1983 : José Pont y Gol
70. 1983–1996 : Ramón Torrella Cascante
71. 1997–2004 : Lluís Martínez Sistach
72. 2004–2019 : Jaume Pujol Balcells
73. 2019–present : Joan Planellas i Barnosell

== See also ==
- List of the Roman Catholic dioceses of Spain.

== Sources ==
- (in Spanish) IBERCRONOX: Arzobispado de Tarragona (Tarraco)
- Archdiocese of Tarragona Official Website
