= Antoni Clarassó i Terès =

Antoni Clarassó i Terès (Note: He has been referenced as Antoni Terès i Cabiscol and Antonius Teres.) (died August 1611) was a Spanish canon of the diocese of Urgell, treasurer-canon of the Cathedral of Barcelona, guest priest at the archdiocese of Tarragona (1588–1591), and vicar general of archbishop and viceroy of Catalonia Joan Terès i Borrull (1587–1599).

== Early years ==
His father was Bernat Clarassó and his mother Joana Terès i Borrull, sister of archbishop and viceroy Joan Terès i Borrull. His siblings were Bernat, Francesch, Joan, Isabel, and Margarida. He got his doctoral studies in law.

== Jesuit ==
His uncle, Joan Terès, sent him to the Society of Jesus, where he lived and died exemplary. He and Joan Terès are remembered in the stories of the Society of Jesus as remarkable benefactors of the Ignacian institution.

== Vicar General of the Archdiocese of Tarragona ==
On August 13 of 1592, Pope Clement VIII approved a bull that decreed the secularization of the regular canons of the Order of Saint Augustine from all monasteries and priories in Catalonia, Roussillon and Cerdanya. It complained about the dissolute life and the lack of discipline in several communities of this order. Clarassó was sent by his uncle to the monastery of Saint Mary of Solsona in order to read this bull to the Augustine canons.

== Death and legacy ==
After a long illness that kept him in bed for seven months, Clarassó died in Barcelona one day of August 1611, between 7 and 8 pm He named the novitiate of Tarragona as his heir, giving all his «books of law» to that institution. The rest of his books were donated to the Jesuit institution where he died. He also left bequests for Miquel Ferrer, his brother-in-law, who assisted him during his illness, and for the siblings Joan and Elisabet Castellví i Terès, from Valencia, children to his cousin Dionísia Terès (also Joan Terès i Borrull's niece) and Pere Castellví.
