= Cyprien =

Cyprien may refer to:

- Cyprien (film), a 2009 film with Catherine Deneuve
- Cyprien, a masculine given name
- Tropical Storm Cyprien, a short-lived tropical cyclone

== People ==
- Glynn Cyprien, American basketball coach
- Jean-Pierre Cyprien, former French footballer
- Johnathan Cyprien, American football strong safety
- Wylan Cyprien, French professional footballer
- Cyprien Iov, French youtuber, comedian, actor, dubber, and blogger

== See also ==
- Saint-Cyprien (disambiguation)
