= Gaspar Cervantes de Gaeta =

Spanish cardinal

His Eminence Gaspar Cervantes de Gaeta
- Archbishop of Tarragona
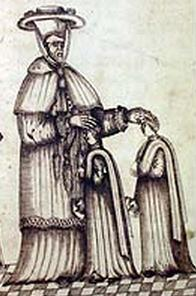
- Church: Catholic Church
- Appointed: 1568
- Term ended: 17 October 1575
- Predecessor: Bartolomé Sebastián Valero de Arroítia
- Successor: Antonio Agustín y Albanell
- Other posts: Cardinal-Priest of S. Vitale (1570); Cardinal-Priest of S. Martino in Montibus (1570–1572); Cardinal-Priest of S. Balbina (1572–1575)
- Previous posts: Bishop of Messina, Italy (1561–1564); Bishop of Salerno, Italy (1564–1568)

Orders
- Consecration: 1561
- Created cardinal: 10 March 1570

Personal details
- Born: Gaspar de Gaeta Alonso ca. 1511 Trujillo, Spain
- Died: 17 October 1575 (aged 64) Tarragona, Spain
- Buried: Tarragona Cathedral
- Denomination: Catholicism
- Residence: Archbishop's Palace of Tarragona
- Parents: Francisco de Gaeta; María Alonso de Cervantes
- Education: University of Salamanca; University of Paris
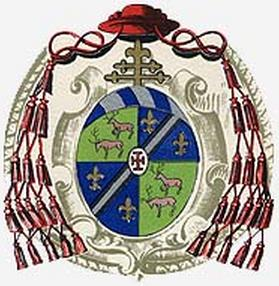
- Coat of arms

Styles of Gaspar Cervantes de Gaeta
- Reference style: His Eminence
- Spoken style: Your Eminence
- Informal style: Cardinal

Gaspar Cervantes de Gaeta (Trujillo, 1511 (Note: However, in the Gran Enciclopèdia Catalana, it is stated that he was born in 1512.) – Tarragona, 17 October 1575) was a Spanish cardinal of the 16th century. He was a relative of the famous Spanish writer Miguel de Cervantes.

== Early years ==
He was born in Trujillo to Francisco de Gaeta and María Alonso de Cervantes. He studied at the Santa Cruz de Cañizares College of the University of Salamanca and at the University of Paris, and later he was appointed councillor and delegate of the Grand Inquisitor of the Kingdom of Aragon.

== Early ecclesiastical career ==
Cervantes was vicar general of the diocese of León, inquisitor and vicar general of the archdiocese of Seville, and inquisitor in Zaragoza and Naples. In 1561 he was elected archbishop of Messina, and later, in 1566, archbishop of Salerno, where he organized several ecclesial synods. Cervantes participated in the Council of Trent, where he stood out for his eloquence and wisdom, thus winning Pope Pius IV's confidence. This Pope entrusted him ecclesiastical matters of high importance. In 1568 was appointed archbishop of Tarragona, but he did not arrive to Tarragona until 1572.

== Archbishop of Tarragona and cardinal ==
Being archbishop of Tarragona, he was appointed cardinal-priest of Saint Vitale by Pope Pius V in the consistory of 17 May 1570. On 9 March that year he changed to the titular church of Saint Martino in Montibus, and in 1572 to Santa Balbina. For this reason, he spent four years in Italy since his appointment at the archdiocese of Tarragona. During his stay in Rome, he was Papal legate for the kingdoms of Spain. Pope Puis V named him a member of the jury that had to try the archbishop of Toledo, Bartolomé Carranza.

Cervantes went back to Tarragona in May 1572. That year he founded the University of Tarragona, to which he donated a total amount of twenty thousand Catalan pounds.

On 16 April 1573, he authorized the village of Almoster to own its own baptismal fonts in its church, which spared its inhabitants the inconvenience of going to Reus for this matter.

In 1574, Cervantes got the suppression of the monastery of Escornalbou from Pius V. The money that he got out of it went to the creation of the Seminary of Tarragona, founded in 1575. This seminary is considered the first one in Spain, which later in 1577, it was combined with the University of Tarragona. In 1575 he also founded a novitiate of the Society of Jesus. He also created a penitentiary canonry, founded a residence for Jesuit monks, a hospice for beggars, and invested on the orphanage. He considered that the inner side of the harbour of Tarragona could be assaulted easily, therefore he decided to extend the defenses adding a bastion to the Roman walls that took his name.

He celebrated an ecumenical council from 1572 to 1574. His auxiliary bishop was Joan Terès i Borrull.

In 1574, Tarragona underwent an episode of drought, and Cervantes tried to redirect a water channel from Puigdelfí. However, Cervantes died before he could finish this project, on 17 October 1575.

In 1577, his remains were moved to a tomb between the chapel of Saint Michael and the chapel of the Eleven Thousand Virgins in the Tarragona Cathedral.

== Legacy ==
In Trujillo he ordered to build the altar in Saint Martin’s Church, where the remains of his mother were placed. The altar is known as the “Altar of Gaeta”. He gave at least sixteen 16th-century tapestries embroidered in Brussels to the Tarragona Cathedral In his will, Cervantes gave thorough details about the administrative regulation and running of the University of Tarragona, which prevented that, years later, the university was abolished by King Philip V of Spain.

Cervantes published a work titled Instruccions, y advertiments molt útils necessaris per les persones ecclesiàstiques y principalment per als qui tenen cura d’ànimes, així de com s’han de haver en les persones, com ensenyar e instruir a sos parroquians en públic y en lo secret de la Penitencia (Barcelona, 1575). This work was originally published in Italian, and when he moved to Tarragona, he ordered to translate it into Catalan. Previously he published in Rome, in 1568, the Constituzioni Sinodali della Chiesa di Salerno.

Lope de Vega dedicated an epitaph to Cervantes in Epitaphios fúnebres a diversos sepulcros.

Cardinal Cervantes street in Tarragona is named after him.

== Notes ==
Catholic Church titles
Preceded by Giovanni Andrea Mercurio	Archbishop of Messina; 1561–1564	Succeeded by Antonio Carcellaro
Preceded by Girolamo Seripando	Archbishop of Salerno; 1564–1568	Succeeded by Marco Antonio Colonna
Preceded by Bartolomé Sebastián Valero de Arroítia	Archbishop of Tarragona; 1568–1575	Succeeded by Antonio Agustín y Albanell
Preceded by Luigi Cornaro	Cardinal-Priest of S. Vitale; 1570	Succeeded by Piedonato Cesi
Preceded by Girolamo di Corregio	Cardinal-Priest of S. Martino in Montibus; 1570–1572	Succeeded by Gabriele Paleotti
Preceded by Lorenzo Strozzi	Cardinal-Priest of S. Balbina; 1572–1575	Succeeded by Gaspar de Quiroga y Vela
