= Cypriot =

Cypriot (in older sources often "Cypriote") refers to someone or something of, from, or related to the country of Cyprus.

- Cypriot people, or of Cypriot descent; this includes:
  - Armenian Cypriots
  - Greek Cypriots
  - Maronite Cypriots
  - Turkish Cypriots
- Cypriot dialect (disambiguation), the dialects being spoken by Cypriots
- Cypriot syllabary, the ancient syllabic writing system of Cyprus, in use 1100–300 BCE
- Cypriot cuisine
