= Antonio Agustín y Albanell =

Spanish historian, jurist and cleric (1516–1586)

Most Reverend Antonio Agustín y Albanell
- Archbishop of Tarragona
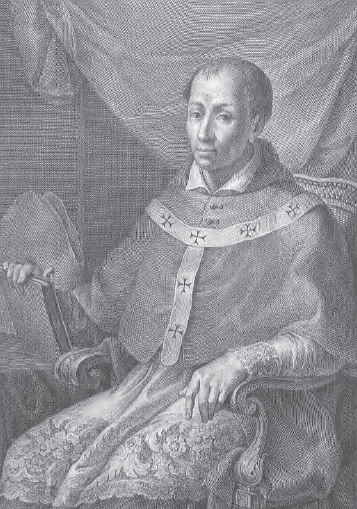
- Antonio Agustín y Albanell.
- Church: Catholic Church
- In office: 1576–1586
- Predecessor: Gaspar Cervantes de Gaete
- Successor: Joan Terès i Borrull

Orders
- Ordination: 18 Dec 1557
- Consecration: 21 Dec 1557 by Giovanni Giacomo Barba

Personal details
- Born: 17 Feb 1517 Zaragoza, Spain
- Died: 31 May 1586 (age 69) Rome, Italy

Antonio Agustín y Albanell (1517–1586), also referred to as Augustinus, was a Spanish humanist historian, jurist, theologian, scholar, bibliophile, and Roman Catholic prelate who led three dioceses in his lifetime and also pioneered the historical research of the sources of canon law.

== Life ==
Born in Zaragoza, Agustín was six when his father, the Vice-Chancellor of Council of Aragon that served during the reign of Ferdinand II of Aragon, passed away in 1523. In 1529, his mother, Doña Aldonza, also died.

Agustín studied law and classical literature in Alcalá, Salamanca, Padua and Bologna, notably as a pupil of Andrea Alciati. He received the Doctor of both laws from Real Colegio Mayor de San Clemente de los Españoles in 1541 and remained there until 1544.

With his nomination as an auditor of the Sacra Rota Romana in 1544, Agustín started his ecclesiastical career, which saw him become a papal nuncio in 1554/55.

In 1557, he was named Bishop of Alife, and ordained as a priest on 18 December. On 21 Dec 1557, he was consecrated bishop by Giovanni Giacomo Barba – Bishop of Terni, with the Archbishop of Turin and Bishop of Troia serving as co-consecrators (Cesare Cibo and Ferdinando Pandolfini, respectively). He was then named Bishop of Lleida in 1561. After participating in the Council of Trent in 1561–63, he was elected Archbishop of Tarragona and confirmed by Gregory XIII on 30 October 1576. He took possession of this metropolitan see on 10 March 1577.

He died on 31 May 1586 and was buried in a chapel that he himself had commissioned in Tarragona Cathedral.

== Work ==
Agustín is now primarily remembered as the first canon law historian; Peter Landau counts him among the other authors that enabled us to consider the 16th century the founding age of the science of history.

His first main work, Emendationum et opinionum libri IV, proposed the now widely accepted thesis that the Littera Florentina manuscript was the source for all other copies of the Pandects. This undermined the authority, fundamental to medieval Roman law, of the Latin Vulgate text of the Pandects.

Agustín's other main historical works are:

- Antiquae Collectionis Decretalium (1576)
- De Emendatione Gratiani dialogorum libri duo (1587), a textual criticism of the Decretum Gratiani
- Epitome iuris pontificii veteris (1587/1611), a compendium of canon law prior to Innocent III
- De quibusdam veteris canonum ecclesiasticorum collectoribus iudicium ac censura (1611, posthumously published), a history of the pre-Gratian sources of ecclesiastical law

== Collection ==
Agustín collected many important Greek and Latin manuscripts. He assembled a library of 1,808 volumes, including 272 Greek manuscripts, 561 Latin manuscripts, and 975 printed works. He also founded printing presses in both Lérida and Tarragona, bringing the printer Felipe Mey from Valencia to operate the latter. After his death, portions of his library were distributed to the Vatican and the El Escorial monastery.

== Notes ==
Catholic Church titles
Preceded by Filippo Angelo Seragli	Bishop of Alife; 1557–1561	Succeeded by Diego Gilberto Nogueras
Preceded by Miguel Puig	Bishop of Lérida; 1561–1576	Succeeded by Miguel Thomàs de Taxaquet
Preceded by Gaspar Cervantes de Gaete	Archbishop of Tarragona; 1576–1586	Succeeded by Joan Terès i Borrull
