= Kyprianos =

Kyprianos may refer to:

- Kyprianos of Cyprus, archbishop of Cyprus (1810–1821)
- Kyprianos Koutsoumpas (1935–2013), Greek Old Calendarist bishop

== See also ==
- Cyprian (disambiguation)
