= Arnau de Palomar =

Arnau de Palomar was the first lord of Riudoms, in Southern Catalonia near the current city of Reus. The lordship of Riudoms was granted to Arnau de Palomar on 24 January 1150 (or 1151) by the lord of the City and Land of Tarragona, Robert Bordet (known as Robert d'Aguiló).
