= Augurius of Tarragona =

Christian Hispano-Roman clergyman (died 259)

Saint Auguri of Tarragona
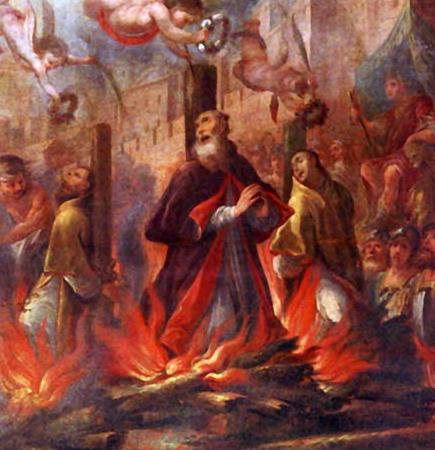
- Saint Fructuosus and the two deacons

Deacon and Martyr
- Born: Tarraco?
- Died: 259
- Venerated in: Roman Catholic Church, Eastern Orthodox Church, Anglican Church
- Feast: January 21

Augurius of Tarragona or Saint Augurius (died 259) was a Christian Hispano-Roman clergyman. It is also cited as Augurinus. Exerting the office of deacon was martyred along with bishop Fructuosus and deacon Eulogius. He died burned alive in the amphitheater of Tarraco during the persecution decreed by the Roman emperors Valerian and Galerius. Possibly were the first martyrs of which there is some sort of documentation in the history of Christianity in Spain.

The years 2008–2009, was the occasion of the 1750th anniversary of his death, a Jubilee was declared by the Roman Catholic Archdiocese of Tarragona by the Pope Pope Benedict XVI.

== Context ==
The text documents the following details. St. Agurius, along with bishop Fructuosus and deacon Eulogius, were just going to bed when they were arrested. They were examined, at which point they affirmed their belief in the Christian God. They were then sentenced to be burnt. Officers were posted to prevent any sort of disturbance breaking out. They were not completely successful, though, and near the gate of the amphitheatre some of the Christians were able to get close to Fructuosus, and one of them asked him for his prayers. St. Fructuosus replied, in a voice loud enough for everyone to hear, "I am bound to bear in mind the whole universal Church from east to west." He then added some words of consolation and encouragement to the assembled. As the flames rose and enveloped the martyrs, they stretched out their arms, praying to their God until they died.

St Augurius feast day is January 21.

== See also ==
- Archaeological Ensemble of Tarraco
- Roman Catholic Archdiocese of Tarragona
- 522 Spanish Martyrs
- Fructuosus

== Bibliography ==
- Andreu Muñoz Melgar, Immaculada Teixell Navarro Tarraco Christiana: història i arqueologia Tarragona: Associació Cultural Sant Fructuós, 2005 (Edició en català, castellà, anglès, francès i italià)
- Jesús Blanco Calvo; Rafael Muñoz Melgar Petita història de Sant Fructuós Barcelona: Mediterrània, 2003
- Jordi Guàrdia Sant Fructuós, pare, pastor, màrtir Barcelona: Centre de Pastoral Litúrgica, 2001
- Miquel Estradé Sant Fructuós, bisbe de Tarragona i màrtir Barcelona: Publicacions de l'Abadia de Montserrat, 1999. 2a edición
- J. Torné i Cubells, et al. Actes de Màrtirs Barcelona: Proa, 1991
- Pio Franchi dei Cavalieri Las Actas de San Fructuoso de Tarragona publicat a Boletín Arqueológico (Tarragona) 65-68 (1959)
- Antoni Dalmau, text; Valentí Miserachs i Grau, música Mil anys. Oratori en quatre quadres del mil·lenari de Santa Maria d'Igualada, per a veus solistes, cor i orquestra El quadre I està dedicat a Sant Fructuós
