= Robert d'Aguiló =

Norman knight (1100–1159)

Robert d'Aguiló (c. 1100 – c. 1159), also known as Robert Bordet, was a Norman knight who moved from Normandy to Catalonia in the early 12th century. He was a native of Cullei (modern Rabodanges in Orne, France), as reported by Orderic Vitalis, and his name d'Aguiló is a catalanized form of "d'Aculley" or "de Culley" that he adopted after marrying the daughter of a Catalan noble.

In 1124 Robert became governor of the newly conquered territory of Tudela and held that post for the next two years. Three years after his term office, on 14 March 1129, he was ceded secular authority in the district of Tarragona by Olegarius, Bishop of Barcelona, with the title of "Prince of Tarragona" (princeps Tarraconensis), effectively the archiepiscopate's vidame or defensor (defender, advocate). His position in Tarragona he maintained until 1153.

On 24 January 1150 Robert granted the lordship of Riudoms to Arnau de Palomar. In 1149 Robert granted a charter to the city of Tarragona, and appointed one Guillem (William) as lord of the city, but Guillem was forced to resign in 1157. This occurred after he attempted to transfer his rights in the city to the Count of Barcelona but Robert rejected the agreement. On 29 April 1157 the lordship of Reus was granted by Robert to the Church of Tarragona but it was transferred to Bertran de Castellet less than two months later on 3 June. Two years later (1159) an ephemeral agreement between the count, the bishop, and Robert was reached.

Robert was married to Agnes Sibylla (died 1170), and had four sons by her: Guillem (William, died 1168), Robert, Ricard (Richard), and Berenguer (Berengar, who in conjunction with Robert, assassinated Bishop Hug de Cervelló in 1171).

== Sources ==
- Bisson, Thomas N. The Medieval Crown of Aragon: A Short History. Oxford: Clarendon Press, 1986. ISBN 0-19-821987-3.
- McCrank, Lawrence J. "The Foundation of the Confraternity of Tarragona by Archbishop Oleguer Bonestruga, 1126–1129." Viator, 9 (1978) pp. 157–168.
- Villegas-Aristizábal, Lucas. "Norman and Anglo-Norman Participation in the Iberian Reconquista." PhD thesis, University of Nottingham, 2007.
