= Cypriot dialect =

Cypriot dialect may refer to:

Living dialects

- Cypriot Arabic
- Cypriot Greek
- Cypriot Turkish

Extinct dialects

- Arcadocypriot
- Eteocypriot
