= Riudoms =

- Municipality
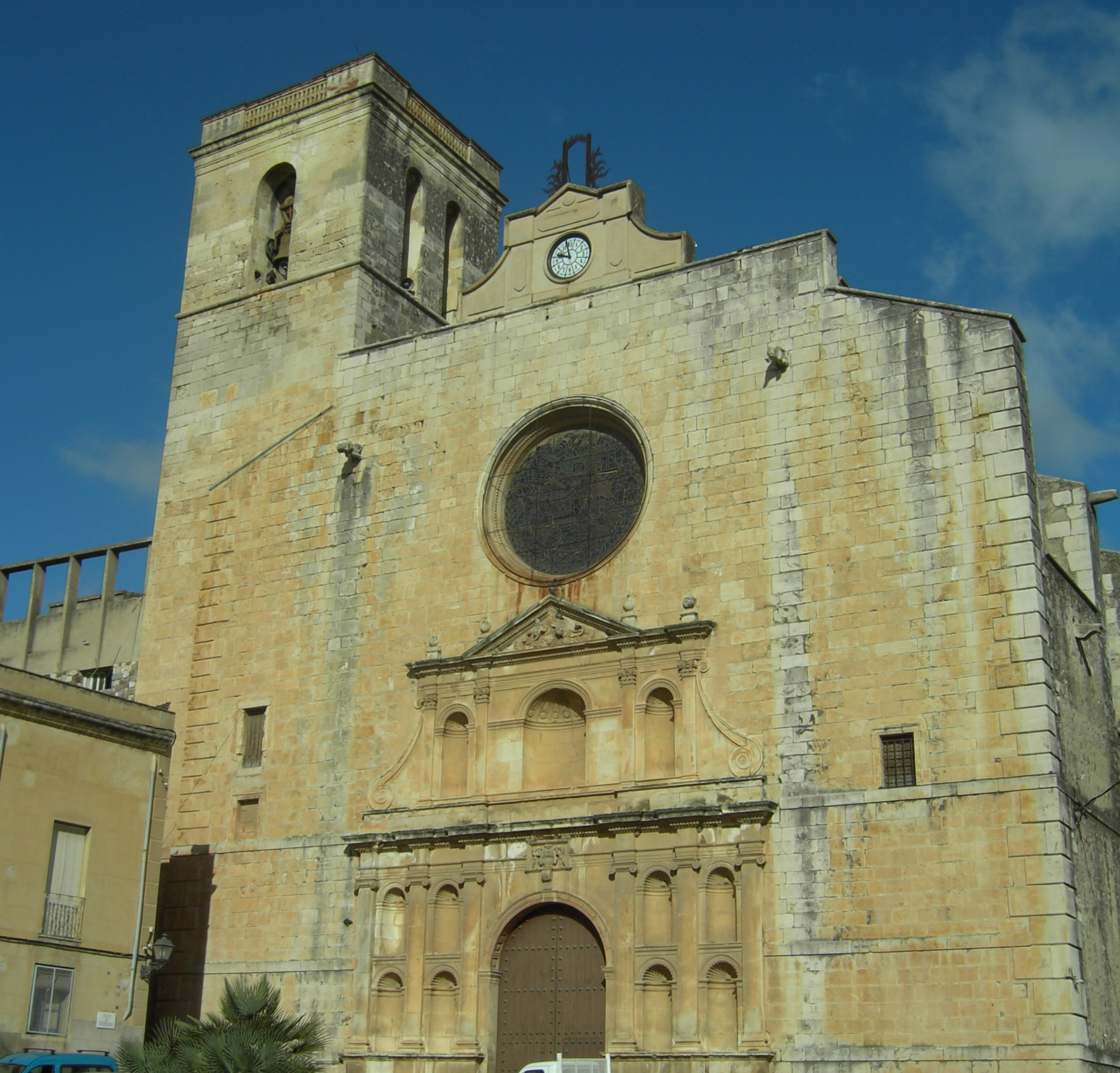
- Parish church of St. James

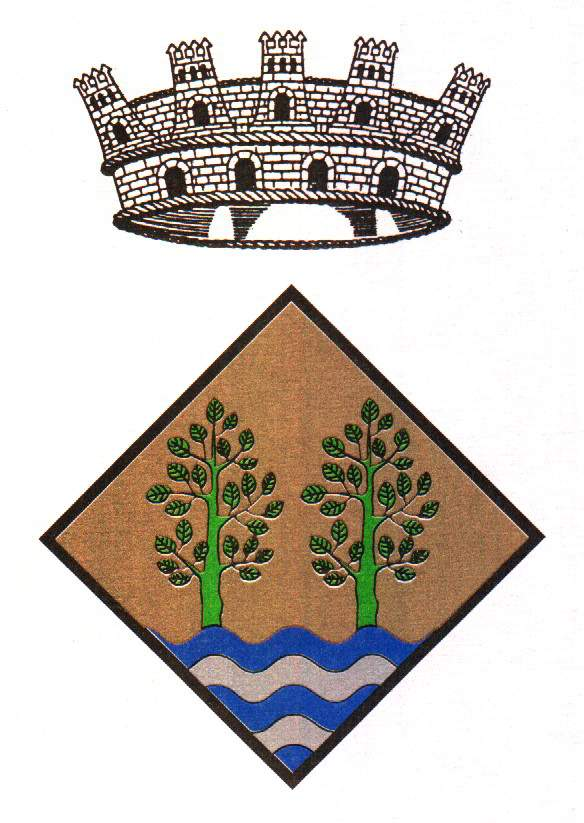
- Flag Coat of arms

- Location within Catalonia
- Coordinates: 41°08′19″N 1°3′13″E
- Autonomous community: Catalonia, Spain
- Province: Tarragona
- Comarca: Baix Camp

Government
  - Mayor: Ricard Gili Ferré (2026)

Area
  - Total: 32.4 km^{2} (12.5 sq mi)
- Elevation: 126 m (413 ft)

Population (2025-01-01)
  - Total: 6,891
  - Density: 213/km^{2} (551/sq mi)
- Demonym: Riudomenc
- Time zone: UTC+1 (CET)
  - Summer (DST): UTC+2 (CEST)
- Postal code: 43330
- Website: www.riudoms.cat

Riudoms (Catalan pronunciation: [riwˈðoms]) is a town in the comarca of Baix Camp, province of Tarragona, in Catalonia, Spain, located about five kilometres from the regional capital Reus. It has a population of 6,891 (register office, 2025).

The main product is the hazelnut, today in recession, and extra virgin olive oil.

== History ==
Riudoms was a Roman rural settlement (some archaeological remains and coins were discovered), that was depopulated when the Muslims dominated the region in the 8th century. Conquered by the Norman Robert d'Aguiló under the orders of the Catalan count, the lordship of Riudoms was granted to Arnau de Palomar on 24 January 1150. A castle was constructed and a town born at side.

This village is considered by some the birthplace of the architect Antoni Gaudí, designer of the Sagrada Família church in Barcelona and the most famous creator of the artistic movement known as Modernisme.

== Gallery ==
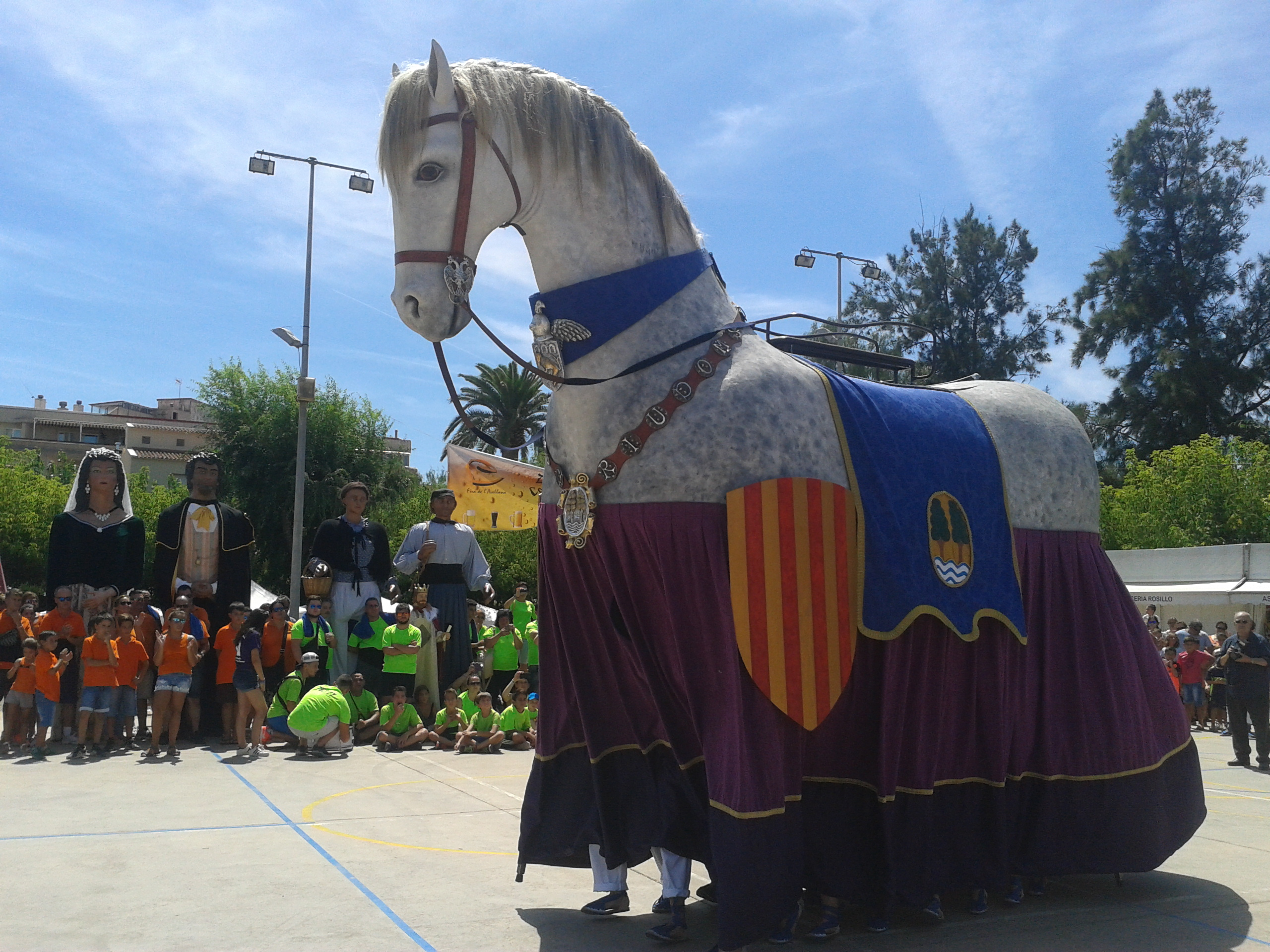
El Cavall dels Nebot

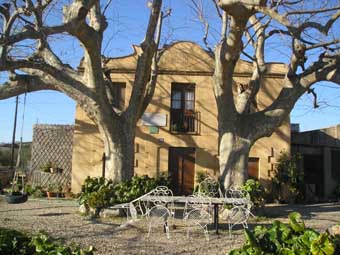
Mas de la Calderera, the house where Antoni Gaudí was born.
