= Ciprian Suciu =

Romanian footballer

Personal information
- Full name: Ciprian Paul Suciu
- Date of birth: 22 January 1987 (age 39)
- Place of birth: Cluj-Napoca, Romania
- Height: 1.80 m (5 ft 11 in)
- Position: Forward

Youth career
- N/A: N/A

Senior career*
Years	Team	Apps	(Gls)
2006	Bihorul Beiuș	?	(?)
2006–2009	Universitatea Cluj	14	(0)
2008	→ Arieșul Turda (loan)	0	(0)
2009–2010	Voința Sibiu	?	(10)
2012	CS Zlatna	?	(?)
2012–2014	Unirea Jucu	?	(?)
Total		14+	(10+)

Managerial career
- 2012: CS Zlatna (assistant)
- * Club domestic league appearances and goals as of 27 February 2018

Ciprian Paul Suciu (born 22 January 1987) is a Romanian former footballer who played as a forward.
