= Fourteenth Council of Toledo =

The Fourteenth Council of Toledo first met in Toledo, Spain, on 14 November 684 under Visigothic King Erwig. It was called in response to a letter from Pope Leo II directing the king, a Count Simplicius, and the recently deceased Quiricus, metropolitan of Toledo, to call a general council to confirm the decisions of the sixth ecumenical council in Constantinople against monothelitism.

== Purpose and attendance ==
A regional synod held in Carthaginiensis with representatives of the metropolitans in attendance was not sufficient and Erwig subsequently called a general council, a year and a day after the disbanding of the Thirteenth Council of Toledo on 13 November 683. The council, due to bad weather and the recent travels to and from Toledo for the Thirteenth Council, was attended only by the bishops of Carthaginiensis, the metropolitans, and a bishop from each of the other provinces: Narbonensis, Tarraconensis, and Gallaecia. These provincial delegates would approve the decision of the Carthaginiensian synod and report it to their own provincial synods, for further approval.

The fourteenth council quickly approved the decisions of the Constantinople council and sent notice to the pope. It also issued a general warning to the people that such doctrinal matters were to be believed, not discussed. The bishops concluded their short business and closed the council on 20 November 684.

== Sources ==
- Thompson, E. A., The Goths in Spain, Clarendon Press: Oxford, 1969.
