= Fructuosus =

Hispanic Christian bishop and saint (died 259)

Saint Fructuosus of Tarragona
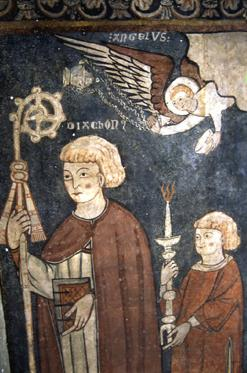
- Detail of a Romanesque mural of Saint Fructuosus at Bierge, Huesca

Bishop and Martyr
- Born: unknown
- Died: 259
- Venerated in: Catholic Church, Orthodox Church, Lutheran Church, Anglican Communion
- Feast: January 21
- Patronage: those undertaking a fast

Saint Fructuosus of Tarragona (Spanish: San Fructuoso, Catalan: Sant Fructuós, died 259) was a Christian saint, bishop and martyr. His is an important name in the early history of Christianity in Hispania. He was bishop of Tarragona and was arrested during the persecutions of Christians under the Roman Emperor Valerian (reigned 253 – 260). Along with him were two deacons, St. Augurius and St. Eulogius. In 259, he was questioned by the praeses Aemilianus and burned at the stake in the local amphitheatre in Tarraco. The Acta of the martyrdom of the bishop Fructuosus and his deacons Augurius and Eulogius document his legend; they are the earliest Hispanic Acta, "marked by a realistic simplicity which contrasts very favourably with many of the Acta of Diocletian's persecution".

== Acta ==
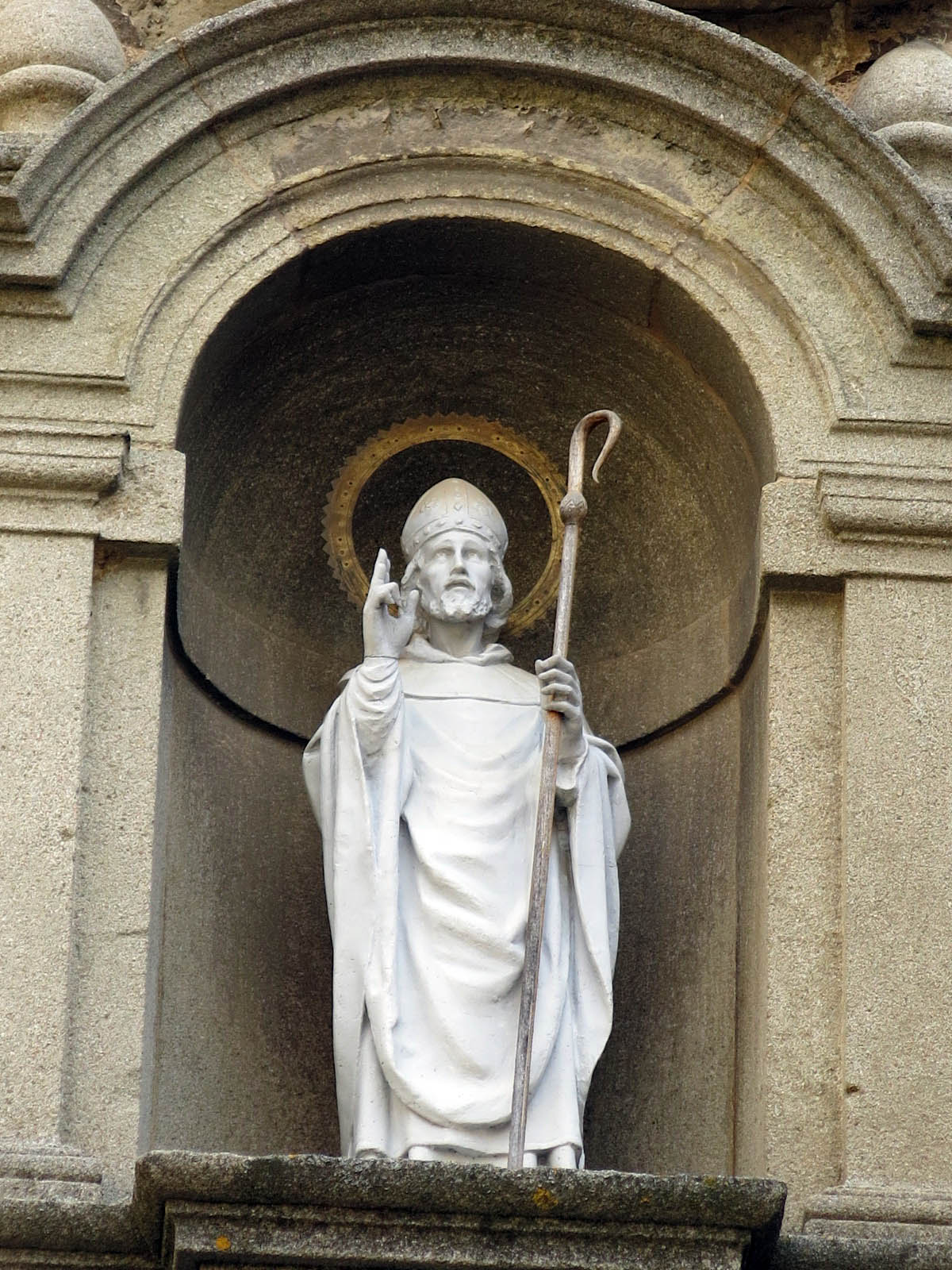
Statue of Saint Fructuosus in Catalonia

The text documents the following details. St. Fructuosus, and his deacons were just going to bed when they were arrested. They were examined, at which point they affirmed their belief in the God of Christianity. Fructuosus was asked, "Are you the bishop?"; after he responded, "I am", the examiner memorably replied "Fuisti" ("You were"). They were then sentenced to be burnt.

The 18th-century hagiographer Alban Butler wrote that while he was being led to his execution "on a Friday at ten o'clock in the morning, [he] refused to drink because it was not the hour [after sunset] to break the fast of the day, though fatigued with imprisonment, and standing in need of strength".

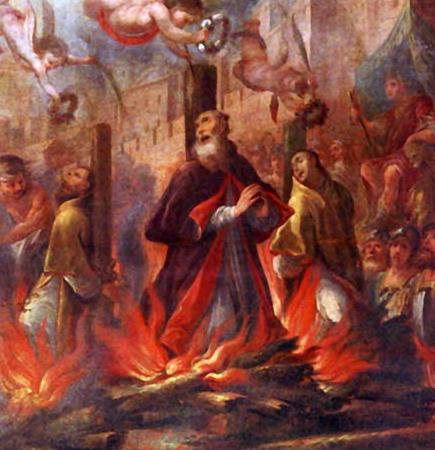
St. Fructuous, Augurius and Eulogius' martyrdom at Tarragona

Officers were posted to prevent any sort of disturbance breaking out. They were not completely successful, though, and near the gate of the amphitheatre some of the Christians were able to get close to Fructuosus, and one of them asked him for his prayers. St. Fructuosus replied, in a voice loud enough for everyone to hear, "I am bound to bear in mind the whole universal Church from east to west." He then added some words of consolation and encouragement to the assembled. As the flames rose and enveloped the martyrs, they stretched out their arms, praying to their God until they died.

His Acta are referred to in a hymn by Prudentius and praised and extensively quoted by Augustine of Hippo. The historical list of the bishops of Tarragona, therefore, begins with Fructuosus.

St. Fructuosus' feast day is January 21.

San Fruttuoso abbey on the Italian Riviera is dedicated to St. Fructuosus.
