= Joaquín de Santiyán y Valdivieso =

Catholic bishop

Joaquín de Santiyán y Valdivieso (Arce, Piélagos, Cantabria, 13 January 1733 - Tarragona, 5 July 1783) was bishop of Urgell, and co-prince of Andorra between 1772 and 1779 and archbishop of Tarragona between 1779 and 1783.
