= Cyprian of Córdoba =

Cyprian of Córdoba (fl. 890) was an Andalusi Christian poet who wrote in Latin.

== Life ==
The only known biographical information about Cyprian is what can be deduced from his own poems. He was an archpriest of the diocese of Córdoba. He provides a date in one of his poems, an epitaph of Samson of Córdoba, who died on 21 August 890.

It is apparent from Cyprian's work that he moved in the highest Christian social and cultural circles in Córdoba. In at least three poems he refers to members of the local Christian aristocracy and he writes at the behest of a certain Count Adulfo. His religious concerns are apparent from his epitaphs of Samson and a local martyr named John.

== Work ==
Page of Cyprian's poems

Cyprian's seven or eight surviving poems, all short, are collected under the title Epigrammata. They were designed to be added as memorial or dedicatory verses at the front or back of copies of the Bible. They are preserved in a single manuscript of the 10th century, the Azagra codex (now no. 10029 in the Biblioteca Nacional de España).

Originally, Cyprian's poems were published as a collection of eight, with the third untitled. Modern editions read this untitled poem as a part of the preceding one, reducing the total number to seven. Juan Tamayo de Salazar assigned two anonymous hymns to Saint Leocadia not found in the Azagra codex to Cyprian, but no other editor has accepted the attribution.

The seven poems are:

1. Praise of Adulfo, who commissioned the poems. Charges his son Ferdinand to cherish his father's bible, in which the poem was inscribed.
2. Epigram for a bible copied by Saturnino for one Zoilo.
3. Words celebrating Count Guifredo's gift of an embroidered hand fan decorated with gold lettering to his wife, Guisinda.
4. More about Guisinda's fan.
5. Epitaph for Samson in heroic metre.
6. Epitaph for the nobleman Hermilde.
7. Epitaph for the confessor John.

Andrew Breeze identifies two lines in Cyprian that seem to be based on the work of Aldhelm, a manuscript of which is known to have been brought to Córdoba in the mid-9th century.

== Bibliography ==
- Armstrong, Nancy J. (2004). Fans in Spain. Bloomsbury.
- Breeze, Andrew (1992). "The Transmission of Aldhelm's Writings in Early Medieval Spain". Anglo-Saxon England. 21: 5–21.
- Gil, Juan, ed. (1973). Corpus Scriptorum Muzarabicorum. Vol. 2. Consejo Superior de Investigaciones Científicas.
- Herrera Roldán, Pedro P. (1994–1995). "En torno al mozárabe Cipriano de Córdoba". Excerpta Philologica. 4–5: 215–229.
- Paniagua Aguilar, David (2018). "Cipriano de Córdoba". Diccionario Biográfico Español. Real Academia de la Historia.
