= Caesarius =

Caesarius may refer to:

- Caesarius of Africa (died c. 3rd century), a Christian martyr
- Caesarius (consul) (fl. 386-403), Eastern-Roman politician
- Caesarius of Arles (468/470 – 542), ecclesiastic in Gaul
- Owain Caesarius, possibly Owain ap Dyfnwal (fl. 934)
- Caesarius of Nazianzus (c. 1180 – c. 1240), physician and politician
- Caesarius of Alagno (died 1263), a Roman Catholic priest, bishop and royal counsellor
- Caesarius of Heisterbach, 13th-century Christian
