= Saint-Cyprien =

Saint-Cyprien may refer to the following places:

== France ==
- Saint-Cyprien, Corrèze, in the Corrèze department
- Saint-Cyprien, Dordogne, in the Dordogne department
- Saint-Cyprien, Loire, in the Loire department
- Saint-Cyprien, Lot, in the Lot department
- Saint-Cyprien, Pyrénées-Orientales, in the Pyrénées-Orientales department
- Saint-Cyprien-sur-Dourdou, in the Aveyron department

== Canada ==
- Saint-Cyprien, Bas-Saint-Laurent, Quebec, municipality in Bas-Saint-Laurent, Quebec
- Saint-Cyprien, Chaudière-Appalaches, Quebec, parish in Chaudière-Appalaches, Quebec
- Saint-Cyprien-de-Napierville, Quebec, municipality in Quebec

== Other uses ==
- Saint-Cyprien XIII, a French former rugby league club, since 2002 absorbed into Saint-Esteve XIII Catalan

== See also ==
- Cyprian (disambiguation)
