= Hug de Cervelló =

Spanish archbishop (died 1171)

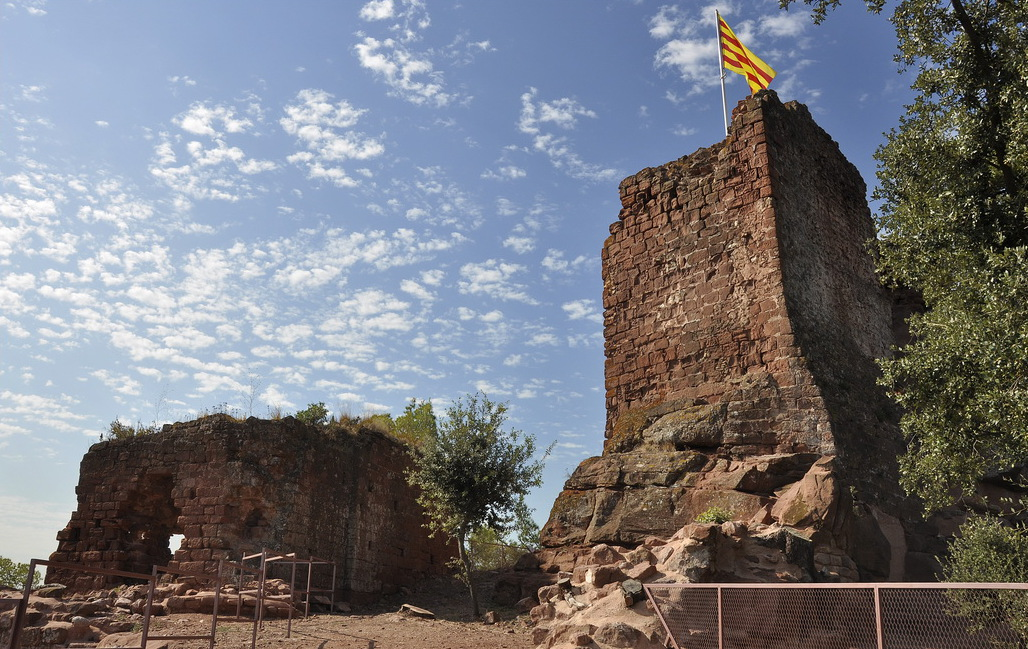
Ruins of the castle of Cervelló today

Hug de Cervelló (died 17 April 1171) was the archbishop of Tarragona from 1164 until his death.

Hug was born in the first half of the 12th century. His father was Guerau Alemany IV of the Barony of Cervelló. He became a canon of the diocese of Barcelona. In 1161, he accompanied Count Ramon Berenguer IV on his visit to Turin, during which the count died. He continued to be close to the count's successor, King Alfonso II.

Alfonso II engineered Hug's election as archbishop in 1164 in order to counterbalance the power of the Bordet princes of Tarragona. Hug did this by granting a charter of repopulation for Selva in 1164; establishing his vassals at L'Albiol and Mas Calvó; becoming the first prior of Escornalbou in 1165; and intervening in disputes, as in that between the bishopric of Urgell and the abbey of Sant Pere d'Àger.

In 1165, the conflict between archbishop and prince turned violent and the former requested the intervention of the king, who finally came to Tarragona in 1168. Prince Guillem d'Aguiló was forced to swear fealty to the archbishop, but he was murdered later that year. His family accused Hug of arranging the assassination. In revenge, Guillem's brothers, Berenguer and Robert, had Hug assassinated on 17 April 1171. This resulted in the downfall of the Bordets, who were forced into exile through the intervention of Pope Alexander III. The 18th-century Catalan historian Marià Marí i Bas compared the killing of Hug to that of Thomas Becket the year before for its dramatic consequences in favour of the church.

In his will, Hug left 100 bezants to Pope Alexander and 250 morabetinos to Cardinal Hyacinth Bobone.

== Works cited ==
- Bonet Donato, María (2018). "Cervelló, Hugo". Diccionario biográfico español. Real Academia de la Historia.
- Smith, Damian J. (2012). "Alexander III and Spain". In Peter D. Clarke; Anne J. Duggan (eds.). Pope Alexander III (1159–81): The Art of Survival. Ashgate. pp. 203–242.
