= Thirteenth Council of Toledo =

The Thirteenth Council of Toledo, called by Visigothic king Erwig, opened in Toledo, Spain, on 4 November 683. 77 bishops, 5 abbots, 3 church dignitaries, and 27 palatine functionaries participated.

The king asked for the pardon and rehabilitation of the rebels against King Wamba in 673. The bishops consented to return to the rebels and their descendants their possessions and positions. The pardon extended to all those who had been disgraced for the same reason since the reign of Chintila (636-640). Erwig desired that no vendettas should hamper his reign.

The council also condemned forced confessions, necessitating justice without torture. They also imposed a maximum prison sentence.

Finally, the council repeated the oft-rendered prohibition on harming the royal family after the death of the monarch.

== Sources ==
- Thompson, E. A. (1969), The Goths in Spain, Oxford: Clarendon Press.
- Synodus Toletana decimum tertium, minutes from the Collectio Hispana Gallica Augustodunensis (Vat. lat. 1341)
