= Tarragona Cathedral =

Catholic cathedral in Tarragona, Spain

- Primatial Metropolitan Cathedral Basilica of Saint Thecla
- Catedral Basílica Metropolitana y Primada de Santa Tecla; Catedral Basílica Metropolitana i Primada de Santa Tecla
- West façade in 2026
- Tarragona Cathedral
- 41°07′09″N 1°15′29″E
- Location: Tarragona
- Address: Plaça de la Seu
- Country: Spain
- Denomination: Catholic
- Website: catedraldetarragona.com

History
- Status: Cathedral
- Dedication: Thecla
- Dedicated: 1331

Architecture
- Style: Romanesque, Gothic
- Groundbreaking: 1171

Specifications
- Height: 51 metres (167 ft)

Administration
- Metropolis: Tarragona

Clergy
- Bishop: Joan Planellas i Barnosell

Spanish Cultural Heritage
- Type: Non-movable
- Criteria: Monument
- Designated: 3 April 1905
- Reference no.: RI-51-0000086

The Primatial Metropolitan Cathedral Basilica of Saint Thecla is a Roman Catholic cathedral located in the highest part of the Spanish city of Tarragona, serving as the episcopal seat of the archdiocese of the same name. It was built on a site that previously housed a Roman temple of imperial worship and a main mosque following the Christian reconquest of the city. Its construction began in the final third of the 12th century, specifically around 1171, and continued through the 13th and 14th centuries until its solemn consecration in 1331.

Architecturally, the building represents one of the most prominent examples of the transitional period between Romanesque and Gothic art in Catalonia. It stands out for its imposing basilical floor plan, its chevet, and a magnificent porticative cloister built starting in the 13th century, which preserves rich sculptural decoration on its capitals. Declared a Historic-Artistic Monument in 1905, the cathedral stands as the city's principal religious and historical monument.

== History ==
The cathedral was begun in 1154.

== Architecture ==
=== Interior ===
Overview of the central nave

The cathedral is in a transitional style between Romanesque and Gothic. It has a basilica plan with a nave and two aisles, a transept with unequal arms, three semicircular apses with deep presbyteries. The apse has three windows in the lower part, and other seven in the upper one, of ogival shape.

The nave has a height of 26 metres at the dome, a length and a width of 16.5 m, while the aisles are 13 m height and 8.25 m wide. The length of the main axle is 101 metres. The nave and the aisles are covered by cross vaults whose ribs are supported by cruciform pilasters annexed to columns; the capitals of the latter feature Moorish motifs. The windows are of two main type: Romanesque, with archivolts, and Gothic, with stained glasses.

The octagonal tower-dome was built in the mid-13th century, and is cross-vaulted. The presbytery and the apse have kept a notable Romanesque pavement, formed by plaques of stone and marble of different colours in geometrical patterns.

The stalls of the choir were made by the Saragossan artist Francisco Gomar in the 15th century, in oak wood. The western side was dismantled and is now in a museum. The organ is from the late 16th century, designed by the architect Jaume Amigó.

==== Chapels ====
The church includes the following chapels, starting from to the right of the entrance towards the choir:

- Chapel of the Virgin Mary (1520). The altarpiece, coming from the parish church of Solivella, was executed by Mateu Ortoneda in the early 15th century.
- Chapel of the Virgin of Montserrat, with an altarpiece from the church of Santes Creus, begun by Guerau Gener and finished by Lluís Borrassà in the early 15th century.
- Chapel of the Conception. in Baroque style (1674), with works by sculptor Francesc Grau and painter Francesc Tramulles Roig.
- Chapel of St. Fructuous and St. John, designed in Renaissance style by Pere Blai
- Chapel of the Holy Sepulchre (1494), housing a 4th-century AD Roman sarcophagus with Gothic additions (Gothic made by an anonymous Valencian sculptor)
- Chapel of the Holiest (1592), in the right transept. It features a large triumphal arch as entrance, an octagonal dome, three chapels with semicircular arches and works from Jaume Amigó, Pere Blai and Bernat Càceres. Archbishop Antonio Agustín y Albanell is buried here.
- Chapel of St. Barbara (14th century)
- Chapel of St. Mary of the Taylors, built before 1350 and later renovated. It has a hexagonal plan and features an extraordinary polychrome stone altarpiece (1368) by Aloi de Montbrai.
- Major Chapel, featuring a notable Gothic sculpture by Pere Johan (1426–1434) in polychrome alabaster
- Chapel of St. Oleguer
- Chapel of St. Luke
- Chapel of St. Thomas (16th century)
- Chapel of the Christ the Healer (15/16th century)
- Chapel of the Rosary (16th century)
- Chapel of the Presentation
- Chapel of St. Francis (1584), designed by Jaume Amigó
- Chapel of St. Tecla, patroness of Tarragona, built in 1777 in late Baroque style over what was once the baptistery
- Chapel of St. Michael and All the Angels (mid-14th century). It contains a sculpture decoration with angels attributed to Jaume Cascalls and an altarpiece, depicting St. Michael, by Bernat Martorell (15th century) from the church of La Pobla de Cérvoles.
- Chapel of the Baptistery (1340–1344), with numerous sculptures featuring the Evangelists with their symbols, and other human and saint figures

=== Exterior ===
Sarcophagus of Bethesda

The unfinished main façade has three portals, corresponding to the nave and the aisles; the central one is in a Gothic style with similarities to that in the Cathedrals of Amiens and Reims, with ogival arcades, while the other two are in Romanesque style. The main gate is surmounted by a large rose window, similar to that in the Monastery of Sant Cugat or in the Cathedral of Majorca. The twelve spokes represent the twelve tribes of Israel, or the apostles. It has a diameter of 11 meters. The two lateral portal have also smaller rose windows.

The main gate, executed by master Bartolomeu from 1277 to c. 1291, features ogival arches of decreasing size enclosed in a square-like tympanum. Below each archivolt, and in the lower section of the side pilasters, are figures with saints and prophets, by Jaume Cascalls and his workshop. Another statue, depicting the Virgin Mary, divides the entrance in two. Its pedestal shows scenes of the Genesis, with the creation of Adam and Eve and the Original Sin. Over the door is an ogival tympanum with the Final Judgement, presided by Christ and Angels, over which is a Gothic window executed by Jaume Cascalls and his workshop in 1375. In the interior, in correspondence to this tympanum, are representations of the Virgin with Saints and two angels. The doors, in cast iron, date to the 15th century.

=== Cloister ===
Cloister halls

The construction of the cloister began perhaps around 1194, although other scholars assign it from 1214 onwards. Located northeast to the cathedral, it has a rectangular plan, measuring 47 by 46 meters. It has a large central courtyard and four galleries divide by pilasters. Some of them include gutters discharging rainwater to the Roman sewer, which was still in use. The vault covering of the galleries follows the model of the monasteries of Poblet and Vallbona de les Monges.

Cloister garden

The arcades of the galleries are organized in groups of three smaller circular arches, surmounted by couples of small rose windows and, above them, a large ogival arch. Above the latter is in turn a frieze in Moorish style. The capitals of the columns are sculpted with religious scenes, such as the visit of the angels to Abraham, Cain and Abel an others. At the corner of the northern gallery are scenes from the Genesis and the New Testament, St. Thomas' incredulity and the legend of St. Nicholas. The wall of the eastern gallery includes an Arab inscription from the year 960, belonging to the former mosque.

The cloister is accessed through a Romanesque gate from the 13th century. It has a tympanum with the Majesty of God and the Tetramorph. The columns supporting the archivolts have capitals with vegetable elements and scenes of the visit of the three Mary to Christ's sepulchre. The column of the mullion is also decorated with a reptile and with scenes of the life of Jesus.

The tradition of the dancing egg is held at the cloister fountain since 1933.

=== Chapel of Corpus Christi ===
The Capitular Hall, dating to the mid-12th century, could be accessed from the cloister or the church. In 1330 it was converted into the Chapel of Corpus Christi It has a square plan and is covered by barrel vault. The entrance has a central door sided by windows. The keystone of the apse (added in the 14th-century) shows a Christ in Majesty, while in the arch are symbols of the Tetramorph. The apse has also a sculpture group of the Annunciation and the decorated tombstone of Alemanda de Rocabertí (died 1373).

The walls of the Hall features several 14th-century sculptures of saints, some with traces of polychrome paint.

=== Chapel of Santa Tecla l'Antiga ===
Old Saint Thecla

Inside the cathedral's garden is the chapel of Santa Tecla l'Antiga ("St. Tecla the Ancient"), built in the 13th century in a transitional Romanesque-Gothic style. It houses the tomb of Bernat de Olivella (1287), by the master Bartolomeu of Girona.

=== Bell tower ===
The Gothic bell tower is located over the southern smaller apse, and was commissioned by bishop Roderic Tello (1289–1308). It has a prism plan enclosed in an octagonal one. The upper part (14th century) is composed of two floors, the first featuring pinnacles and windows. Over the latter is a small temple, realised in 1511, housing the bells.

The bell tower has a total height of 51 metres.

== Gallery ==
Remote view

Bell tower

Choir

Main Altar

Crossing

Organ

Chapel of the Virgin of Montserrat

Capitals

== See also ==
- High medieval domes

== Sources ==
- Barral i Altet, Xavier (1994). Les Catedrals de Catalunya (in Catalan). Barcelona: Edicions 62. ISBN 84-297-3823-1.
- Terés i Tomás, M. Rosa (1997). Art de Catalunya, Escultura antiga i medieval (in Catalan). Vol. 6. Barcelona: Edicions L'isard. ISBN 84-921314-6-2.
