= 1521–1522 conclave =

Election of Catholic Pope Adrian VI

Papal conclave 1521–22

Dates and location
- 28 December 1521 – 9 January 1522; Apostolic Palace, Papal States

Key officials
- Dean: Bernardino de Sande
- Camerlengo: Francesco de' Medici
- Protodeacon: Giulio de' Medici

Election
- Candidates: Giulio de' Medici; Alessandro Farnese; Thomas Wolsey

Elected pope
- Adriaan Boeyens; Name taken: Adrian VI
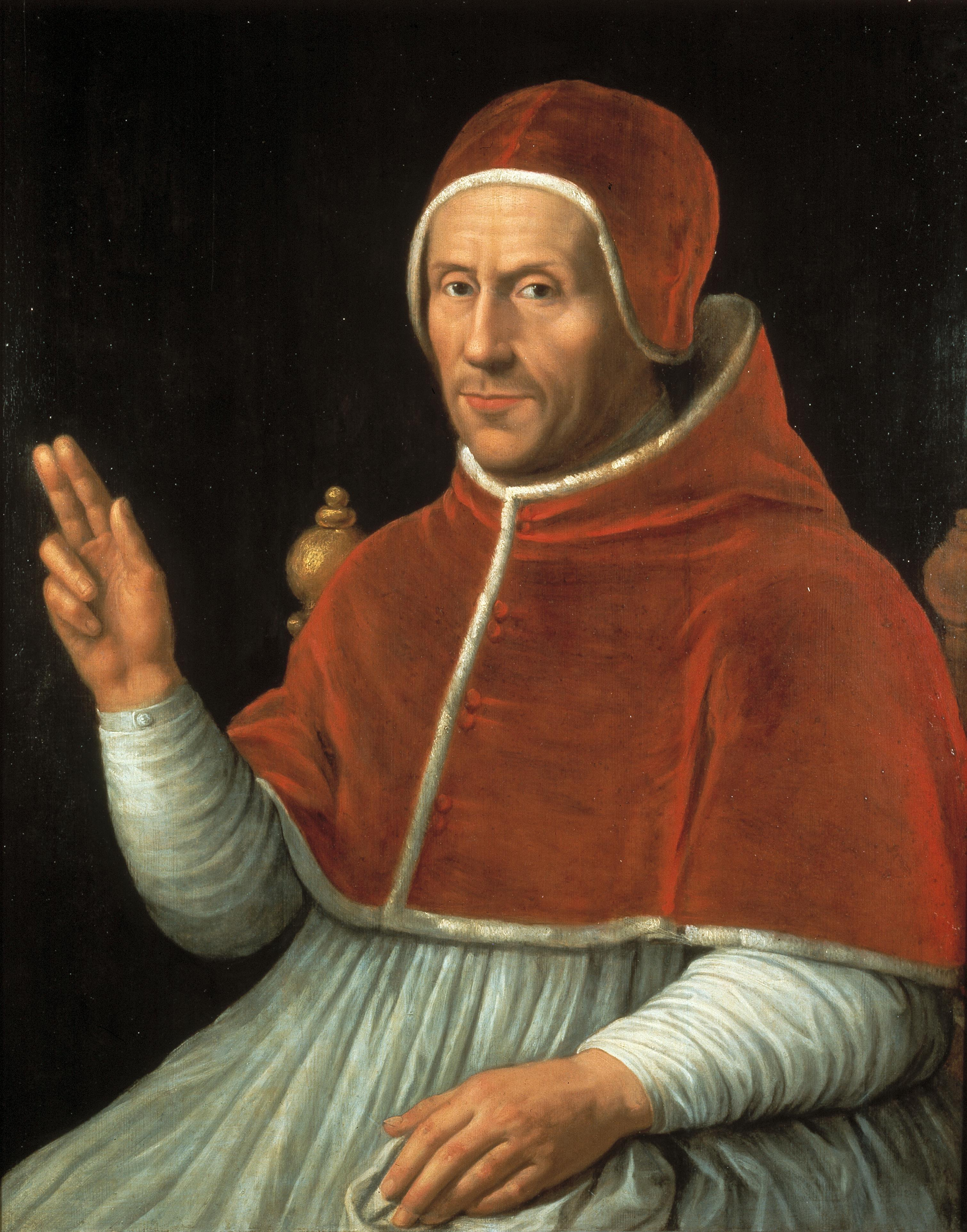

The 1521–22 papal conclave elected Pope Adrian VI to succeed Pope Leo X. The conclave was marked by the early candidacies of cardinal-nephew Giulio de'Medici (future Pope Clement VII) and Alessandro Farnese (future Pope Paul III), although the Colonna and other cardinals blocked their election.

Adrian, the viceroy to Spain and a clear pro-Imperial candidate, was elected as a compromise candidate despite his absence from the conclave. The number of cardinal-electors (thirty-nine) and the length of the sede vacante increased the cost of the conclave even in excess of the funds distributed by Charles V, Holy Roman Emperor, Francis I of France, and Henry VIII of England to promote their candidates.

== Cardinal electors ==
There were thirty-nine cardinal electors, only three of whom were non-Italians (two Spaniards and one Swiss). Nine non-Italians did not attend (compared to only one Italian), despite the lengthy delay. The lengthy delay was due to the capture of one cardinal on his way to Rome, who was held for ransom. In the meantime, the agents of Charles V, Holy Roman Emperor, Francis I of France, and Henry VIII of England began to distribute the large sums that the monarchs had sent to Rome for bribes.

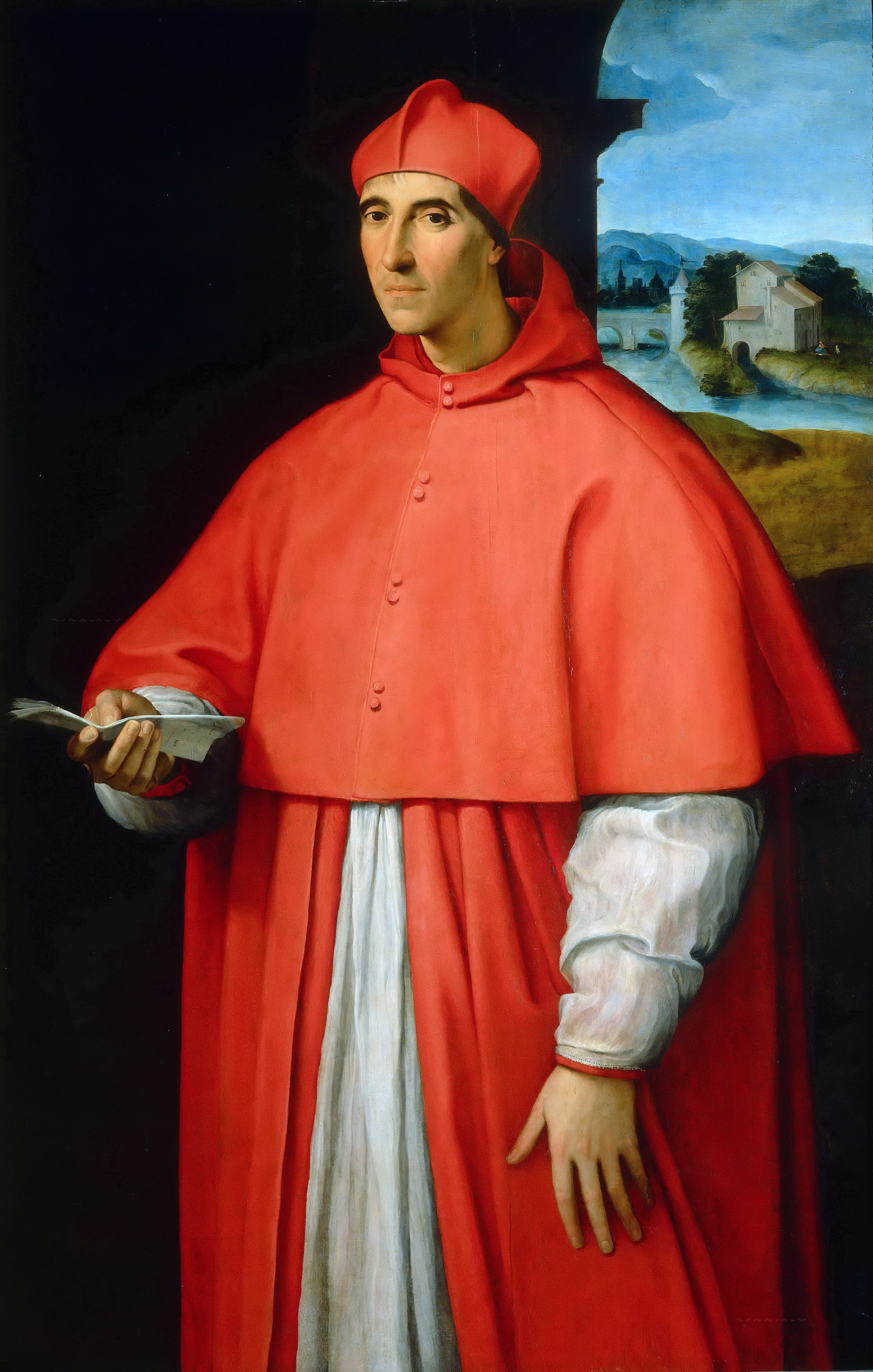
Alessandro Farnese (future Pope Paul III)

The preferred choice of Henry VIII was Thomas Wolsey (for whom he was prepared to spend 100,000 ducats), although Giulio de'Medici (future Pope Clement VII) was also acceptable to him. Henry VIII asked Charles V (with whom he was allied) to support Wolsey and send his army to Rome. Even the large bribes of these monarchs were less than the cost of the conclave, and even the papal tiara was mortgaged to continue to fund it, and only a very few of the Italian cardinals would even consider a non-Italian.

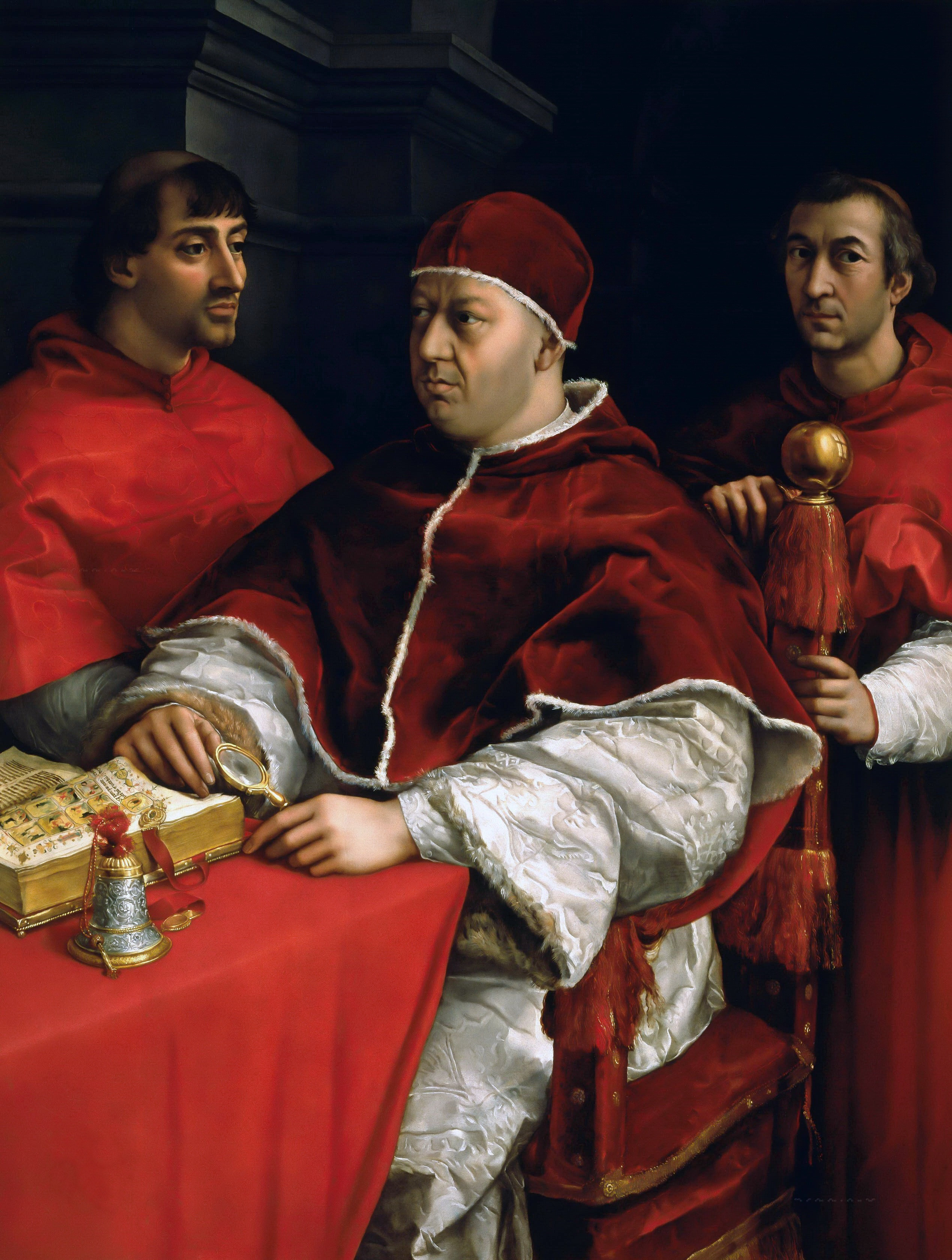
Pope Leo X (center) with his cardinal-nephew Giulio de'Medici (left), a leading papabile in the conclave, later elected Pope Clement VII.

Charles V eventually threw his support behind Medici rather than Wolsey, although he was opposed by many because he was the cousin of Leo X and the College feared a hereditary papacy.

Francis I supported the election of a French pope, backed by one million gold ecus, although whether he actually sent the funds to Rome is unclear; in fact, Francis I's agents focused their attention on the pro-French Italian candidates, mainly the three Venetians. Francis I claimed to control the votes of twelve cardinals.

Medici for his part entered the conclave with fifteen or sixteen supporters, but very little chance of securing additional votes.

=== The papabile ===
The bookmakers of Rome offered bets on the papabile, an early example of gambling on papal elections; Medici had the best odds at 25 to 100; Farnese's odds were 20 to 100.

=== Present ===
There were 39 Cardinal-electors present :

- Bernardino de Carvajal (Spanish)
- Domenico Grimani
- Francesco Soderini
- Alessandro Farnese (future Pope Paul III)
- Niccolò Fieschi
- Antonio Maria Ciocchi del Monte
- Pietro Accolti
- Achille Grassi
- Matthäus Schiner (Swiss)
- Lorenzo Pucci
- Giulio de' Medici (future Pope Clement VII)
- Giovanni Piccolomini
- Giovanni Domenico de Cupis
- Raffaele Petrucci
- Andrea della Valle
- Bonifacio Ferrero
- Giovanni Battista Pallavicino
- Scaramuccia Trivulzio
- Pompeo Colonna
- Domenico Giacobazzi
- Lorenzo Campeggio
- Ferdinando Ponzetti
- Francesco Armellini de Médici
- Tommaso de Vio
- Silvio Passerini
- Cristoforo Numai
- Egidio da Viterbo
- Guillén de Vich (Spanish)
- Marco Corner
- Sigismondo Gonzaga
- Innocenzo Cybo
- Franciotto Orsini
- Paolo Emilio Cesi
- Alessandro Cesarini
- Giovanni Salviati
- Niccolò Ridolfi
- Ercole Rangoni
- Agostino Trivulzio
- Francesco Pisani

=== Absent ===
Nine cardinals did not participate in the conclave:

- François de Castelnau (French)
- Albert of Brandenburg (German)
- Eberhard von der Marck (German)
- Matthäus Lang von Wellenburg (German)
- Thomas Wolsey (English)
- Louis de Bourbon-Vendôme (French)
- Adrian Florenszoon Dedel (Dutch) (elected as Pope)
- Afonso of Portugal (Portuguese)
- Jean de Lorraine (French)

== Proceedings ==
The conclave began on 28 December, twenty-seven days after the death of Leo X. The cardinals agreed to a conclave capitulation, but Baumgartner calls it "an exercise in futility as always". The balloting began on 30 December.

Farnese, supported by Medici and his supporters, received twelve initial votes, all from creations of Leo X. If Farnese could have secured the votes of Leo X's other cardinals (twenty-eight of the thirty-nine electors), he could easily have been elected. The Roman mob looted his home (as was customary for newly elected popes) and his odds increased to 40 to 100, although his votes dropped to four on the second day. After the second ballot, one cardinal pleading ill health was released from the conclave by a two-thirds vote.

The conclave dragged well into 1522, taking only one vote per day; various Italian ambassadors remained well-informed of the progress throughout. Farnese remained the favorite into the eighth scrutiny, with Medici asking for an accessus after Farnese received twelve votes. Farnese received eight or nine additional votes by accessus, and one cardinal even shouted out "Papam Habemus!". However, two of Farnese's strongest opponents demanded a formal counting of the votes, and it was revealed that Farnese was just short of the required supermajority, after which Farnese was discredited and lost support.

Medici attempted to promote the candidacy of others in his party, but none could gain wide support. Wolsey received eight votes, but his young age deterred other cardinals from supporting him (the English ambassador tried to convince the College he was over fifty). Medici addressed the conclave on 9 January and suggested they turn their attention to candidates not present in the conclave, expressing his willingness to elect Adrian of Utrecht. In the following scrutiny Adrian received fifteen votes, including all those controlled by Medici. Colonna, the main opponent of Medici and those in his party then declared his support for Adrian, netting him thirteen more votes by accessus, exactly two-thirds. As Adrian was not present, his candidacy did not require two-thirds plus one.

The crowd did not understand which cardinal had been elected immediately upon announcement, as Adrian was relatively obscure and currently in Spain as viceroy to Charles V. Three cardinals were dispatched to inform him of his election, with a private letter reaching him on 24 January (the cardinals would not arrive until March). In the meantime, rumors of Adrian VI's death spread in Rome and Francis I began to prepare for a new conclave. When news of his election as Bishop of Rome first reached him, he hesitated, but out of a sense of duty, he ended up accepting.

The cardinals did not bring a fisherman's ring with them to Spain, to ensure that Adrian VI would be forced to travel to Rome, where he arrived on 28 August. Adrian VI said mass every day for the year he was pope, in contrast to his two predecessors who may have never celebrated mass at all.
