= 1523 conclave =

Election of Catholic Pope Clement VII

Papal conclave October–November 1523

Dates and location
- 1 October – 19 November 1523; Apostolic Palace, Papal States

Key officials
- Dean: Bernardino de Sande
- Camerlengo: Francesco de' Medici
- Protodeacon: Giulio de' Medici

Election
- Candidates: Alessandro Farnese; Giulio de' Medici

Elected pope
- Giulio de' Medici; Name taken: Clement VII
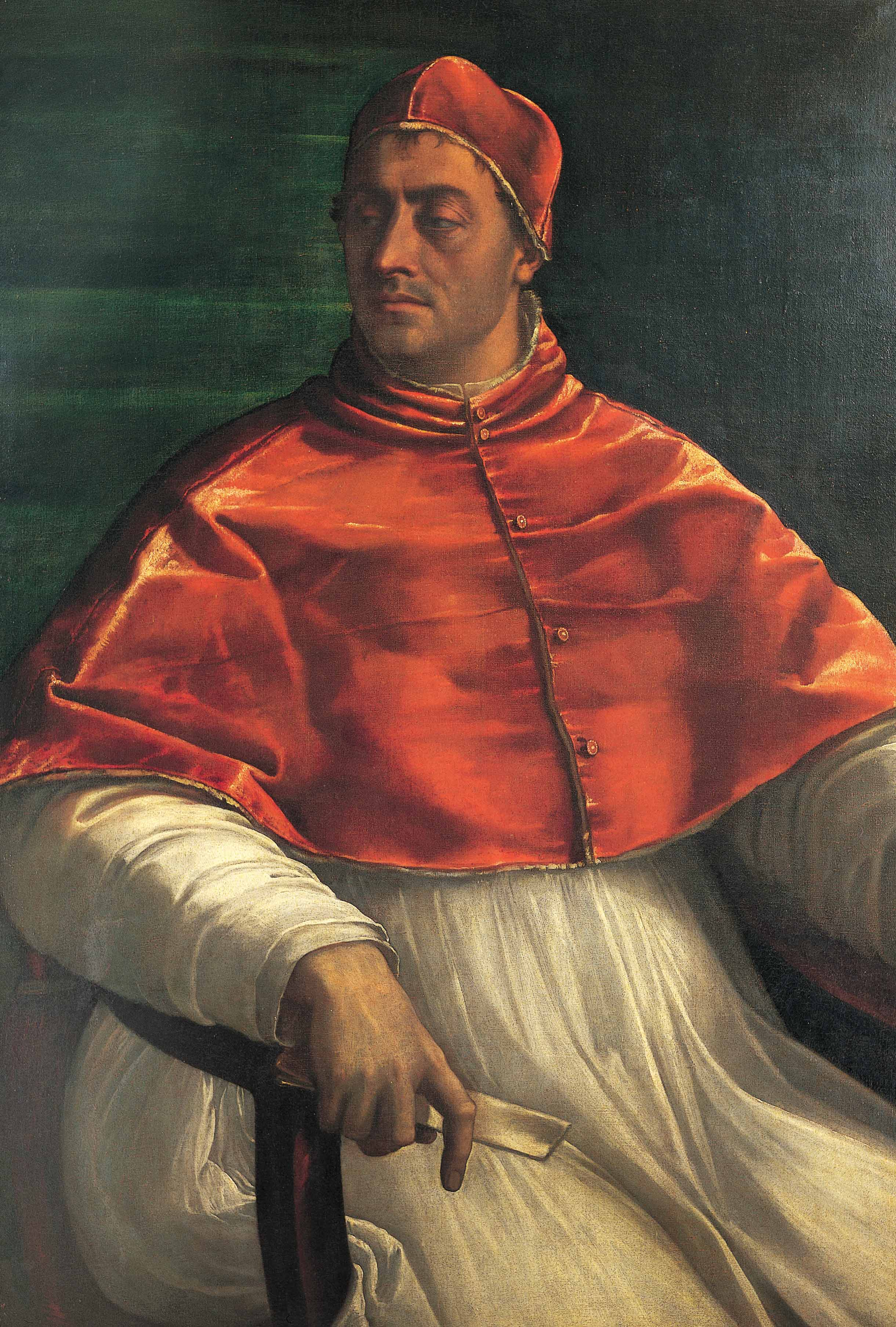

The 1523 conclave elected cardinal Giulio de' Medici as Pope Clement VII to succeed Pope Adrian VI. According to conclave historian Baumgartner, this was the "last conclave of the Renaissance".

== Background ==
Adrian VI experienced ill health during the final months of his life, inspiring the cardinals to begin politicking. Francis I of France had just dispatched a large army into northern Italy in 1522, and expecting to leverage this force to effect the election of French cardinal Jean de Lorraine, or more likely a pro-French Italian cardinal such as Niccolò Fieschi. However, his army experienced a major defeat at the Battle of Bicocca prior to the conclave. In any case, the three French cardinals were ordered by Francis I to rush to Rome.

Charles V, Holy Roman Emperor, strengthened by the Battle of Bicocca, supported Giulio de' Medici, an advocate for imperial policy within the college. Henry VIII of England would have preferred the election of Thomas Wolsey, but was in no position to effect it; Henry VIII sent two letters—one supporting Medici, the other supporting Wolsey—which were to be distributed to the college in that order. The odds against the election finishing before October were given at 60 to 100. The odds were given as 80 to 100 against the conclave finishing in November, and those who took them lost heavily.

=== The papabile ===
Gambling on papal elections occurred, and the bookmakers favored Farnese, followed by Medici. Conclave secrecy was non-existent due to the ambassadors who "reported daily" on the balloting and living conditions. Similarly, the law of the conclave requiring the reduction of rations was not followed.

== List of participants ==
There were 39 Cardinal-electors present :

- Bernardino de Carvajal (Spanish)
- Francesco Soderini
- Niccolò Fieschi
- Alessandro Farnese (future Pope Paul III)
- Antonio Maria Ciocchi del Monte
- Pietro Accolti
- Achille Grassi
- Lorenzo Pucci
- Giulio de' Medici (elected Pope Clement VII)
- Giovanni Piccolomini
- Giovanni Domenico de Cupis
- Andrea della Valle
- Giovanni Battista Pallavicino
- Scaramuccia Trivulzio
- Pompeo Colonna
- Domenico Giacobazzi
- Lorenzo Campeggio
- Ferdinando Ponzetti
- Silvio Passerini
- Francesco Armellini de Médici
- Egidio da Viterbo
- Cristoforo Numai
- Guillén de Vich (Spanish)
- Willem van Enckevoirt (Dutch)
- Marco Corner
- Sigismondo Gonzaga
- Innocenzo Cybo
- Franciotto Orsini
- Paolo Emilio Cesi
- Alessandro Cesarini
- Giovanni Salviati
- Niccolò Ridolfi
- Ercole Rangoni
- Agostino Trivulzio
- Francesco Pisani
- François de Castelnau (French, joined October 6)
- Louis de Bourbon-Vendôme (French, joined October 6)
- Jean de Lorraine (French, joined October 6)
- Bonifacio Ferrero (joined November 10)

== Absentees ==
Six cardinals did not participate in the conclave:

- Matthäus Lang von Wellenburg (German)
- Thomas Wolsey (English)
- Tommaso de Vio
- Albert of Brandenburg (German)
- Eberhard von der Marck (German)
- Afonso of Portugal (Portuguese)

== Proceedings ==
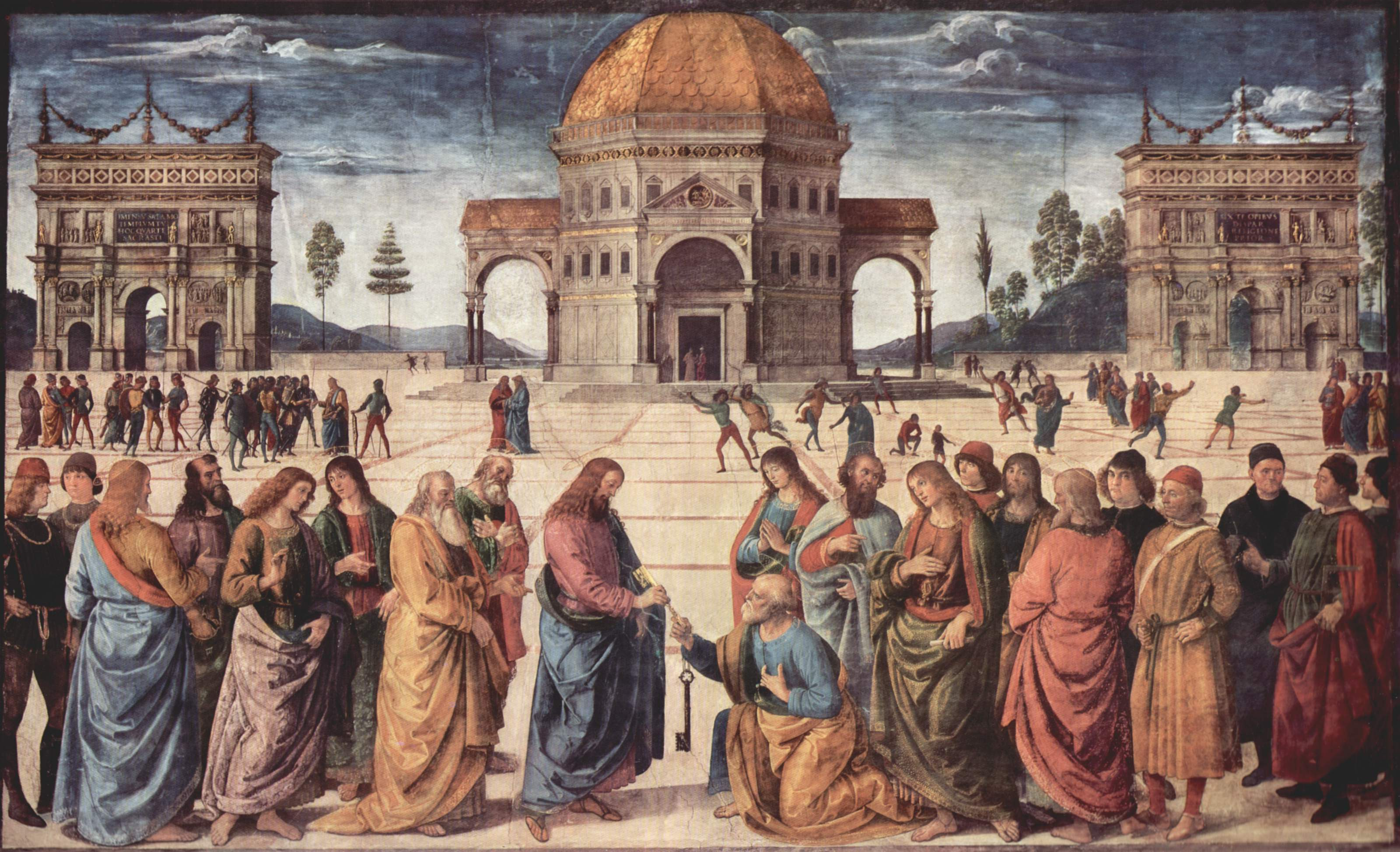
Medici was housed under Perugino's Christ Giving the Keys to St. Peter—considered an omen of his election.

The conclave opened on October 1, with thirty-five cardinals in attendance. Nine cardinals were absent. Baumgartner apparently believes that the only cardinal created by Adrian VI (a fellow Dutchman) was absent, but all the conclave attendance lists show him as participating. Cardinal Giulio de' Medici had sixteen or seventeen supporters; Cardinal Pompeo Colonna had the second most. The "anti-Imperial/anti-Medici" cardinals successfully demanded that the first scrutiny be delayed until the French Cardinals, who were known to be on the way, arrived. On October 6, they appeared, raising the number of electors to thirty-nine. Medici drew the lot to have his cell under Christ Giving the Keys to St. Peter, a portrait seen as an omen of election as Julius II had been housed underneath it as well. The remark demonstrates incidentally that the voting was taking place in the Chapel of S. Nicolas and the sleeping quarters were in the Sistine Chapel.

Fieschi was the candidate of the French and received eleven votes; Carvajal (the stalking horse of the Imperial party) received twelve. Both parties switched their support in the next scrutiny with Antonio Maria Ciocchi del Monte coming within one vote of election following an accessus. Medici had previously agreed to support del Monte as the final vote, but broke his word and did not come forward.

After the conclave reached its tenth day, Cardinal Thomas Wolsey allegedly received twenty-two votes, although he never received more —conclave mythology of the most unlikely sort. By October 13, the Imperial party started voting for Medici, with the French supporting Farnese. Medici's supporters remained disciplined into November, while the French faction began to crack. Colonna (who despised Medici despite his close ties to Charles V) held a block of four votes against Medici. However, on October 18, when the French faction proposed the candidacy of Orsini (the Colonna family and Orsini family being rivals), Colonna was impelled to throw his support to Medici, giving him twenty votes.

On November 10, Cardinal Ivrea (Bonifacio Ferrero) finally entered the Conclave, having been released from captivity.

Cardinal Giulio de' Medici easily reached the requisite twenty-seven by accessus and took the name Clement VII.
