= Lluís Martínez i Sistach =

Spanish Catholic bishop (born 1937)

His Eminence Luis Martínez i Sistach
- Cardinal, Archbishop Emeritus of Barcelona
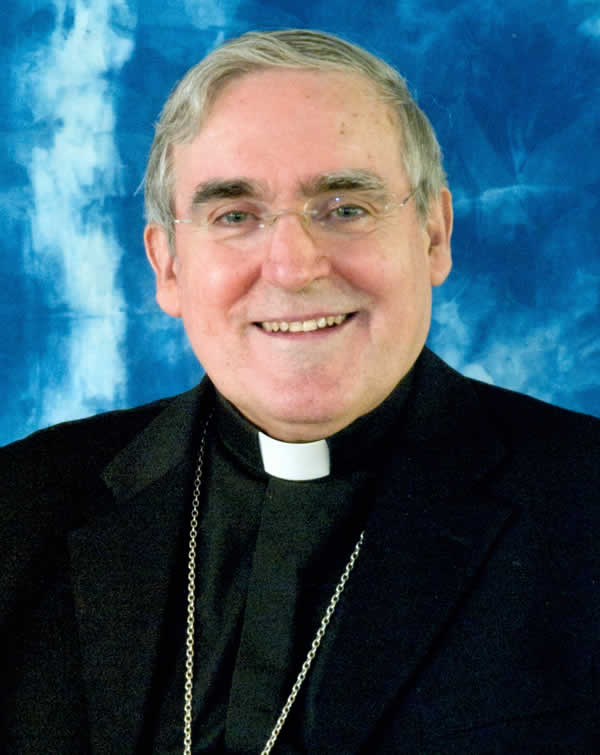
- Diocese: Barcelona
- Appointed: 15 June 2004
- Installed: 18 July 2004
- Term ended: 6 November 2015
- Predecessor: Ricardo María Carles Gordó
- Successor: Joan Josep Omella i Omella
- Other post: Cardinal-Priest of S. Sebastiano alle Catacombe
- Previous posts: Auxiliary Roman Catholic Bishop of Barcelona and Titular Bishop of Aliezira (1987–1992); Roman Catholic Bishop of Tortosa (1992–1997); Roman Catholic Archbishop of Tarragona (1997–2004)

Orders
- Ordination: 17 September 1961 by Gregorio Modrego y Casaus
- Consecration: 27 December 1987 by Narcís Jubany Arnau
- Created cardinal: 24 November 2007 by Pope Benedict XVI
- Rank: Cardinal-Priest

Personal details
- Born: Lluís Martínez i Sistach; 29 April 1937 (age 89) Barcelona, Spain
- Denomination: Catholic
- Parents: Joan Martínez i Puig and Maria Sistach i Masllorens
- Motto: Charitas Christi virget nos
- Coat of arms: Luis Martínez i Sistach's coat of arms

Styles of Lluís Martínez i Sistach
- Reference style: His Eminence
- Spoken style: Your Eminence
- Informal style: Cardinal
- See: Barcelona

Ordination history of Lluís Martínez i Sistach
History
Episcopal consecration
- Consecrated by: Narcís Jubany Arnau (Barcelona)
Cardinalate
- Elevated by: Pope Benedict XVI
Episcopal succession
Bishops consecrated by Lluís Martínez i Sistach as principal consecrator
- Francesc-Xavier Ciuraneta i Aymi: 14 September 1991
- Jaume Pujol i Balcells: 19 September 2004

Lluís Martínez i Sistach (born 29 April 1937) is a Spanish prelate of the Catholic Church. He is Archbishop emeritus of Barcelona, having served as archbishop there from 2004 to 2015. He has been a cardinal since 2007.

Martínez was born on 29 April 1937 in Barcelona, Catalonia, Spain, the son of Joan Martínez i Puig, a commercial representative, and Maria Sistach i Masllorens, a housewife. He had two sisters. The family resided in the neighborhood of Guinardó. He studied at Marist Brothers' Collegi de la Immaculada in Barcelona from 1942 to 1953 and at the Major Seminary of Barcelona from 1954 to 1961. He was ordained a priest on 17 September 1961. He studied at the Pontifical Lateran University in Rome from 1962 to 1967 where he earned a doctorate utriusque iuris (in both canon and civil law) in 1967. His dissertation, "El Derecho de asociación en la Iglesia" (The right of association in the Church), was published by the Theological Faculty of Catalonia.

In 1987 Martínez was appointed Auxiliary Bishop of Barcelona with the titular see of Algeciras. He was appointed Bishop of Tortosa in 1991. In 1997 he became Archbishop of Tarragona and in 2004 he became Archbishop of Barcelona.

Pope Benedict XVI made him a cardinal in the consistory held on 24 November 2007. He became Cardinal-Priest of San Sebastiano alle Catacombe.

He opposed legislation introduced in the Catalan parliament in December 2007 requiring local governments to set aside land for mosques and other places of worship. He said that "A church, a synagogue or a mosque are not the same thing" and that the law "impinges on our ability to exercise a fundamental right, that of religious liberty."

Martínez is also a member of various offices of the Roman Curia. In May 2008 Pope Benedict named Martínez to the Pontifical Council for Legislative Texts. On 12 June 2008, Pope Benedict named him a member of the Apostolic Signatura and a member of the Pontifical Council for the Laity.

Martínez received Pope Benedict XVI when Pope Benedict visited Barcelona and Santiago de Compostela in 2010.

On 18 September 2012, Pope Benedict XVI named Martínez a Synod Father for the October 2012 13th Ordinary General Assembly of the Synod of Bishops on the New Evangelization.

He was one of the cardinal electors who participated in the 2013 papal conclave that elected Pope Francis.

When some prelates criticized the document that summarized the deliberations of the October 2014 Synod of Bishops, Martínez defended the document, saying "It is far from being complete, but it is an unbiased summary." He added: "We must all convert ourselves, and conversion is a painful experience."

Pope Francis accepted his retirement on 6 November 2015.

Martínez is the Grand Prior of the España Oriental Lieutenancy of the Equestrian Order of the Holy Sepulchre of Jerusalem.

== Bibliography ==
- Lluis Martinez Sistach (2008), Associations of Christ’s Faithful, Chambly, Wilson & Lafleur, 194 pgs. ISBN 978-2-89127-848-5

Catholic Church titles
| Preceded by Ramón Daumal Serra | Auxiliary Bishop of Barcelona; 6 November 1987 – 17 May 1991 | Succeeded by Carles Soler Perdigó |
| Preceded by Altivo Pacheco Ribeiro | — TITULAR — Titular Bishop of Algeciras; 6 November 1987 – 17 May 1991 | Succeeded by Joan Carrera Planas |
| Preceded by Ricardo María Carles Gordó | Bishop of Tortosa; 17 May 1991 – 20 February 1997 | Succeeded by Javier Salinas Viñals |
| Preceded by Ramón Torrella Cascante | Archbishop of Tarragona; 20 February 1997 – 15 June 2004 | Succeeded by Jaume Pujol Balcells |
| Preceded by Ricardo María Carles Gordó | Archbishop of Barcelona; 15 June 2004 – 6 November 2015 | Succeeded by Joan Josep Omella i Omella |
| Preceded by Johannes Willebrands | Cardinal-Priest of San Sebastiano alle Catacombe; 24 November 2007 – | Incumbent |
