= Niccolò Ridolfi =

Italian cardinal (1501–1550)

Niccolò Ridolfi

Niccolò Ridolfi (1501 – 31 January 1550) was an Italian cardinal.

== Early life ==
Born in Florence, son of Piero Ridolfi and Contessina de' Medici (the daughter of Lorenzo de' Medici the Magnificent). His father was a Gonfaloniere of Justice. The family was wealthy and prominent. Pope Leo X was Niccolò's maternal uncle and granted him a quick ecclesiastical career. He was named governor of Spoleto in the period 1514-1516 and protonotary apostolic at the age of thirteen. Niccolò became a long time friend of humanist Gian Giorgio Trissino, who served Leo as his Nuncio in Germany.

== Church career ==
Pope Leo X created him cardinal deacon in the consistory of 1 July 1517 at the age of sixteen with the deaconry of SS. Vito e Modesto. Later his uncle appointed him administrator of the see of Orvieto on 24 August 1520 and he kept that post until 3 September 1529. Ridolfi participated in the conclaves of 1521–1522 and 1523.

Pope Clement VII named him archbishop of Florence on 11 January 1524. He resigned from that position on 11 October 1532. He served also as administrator of Vicenza from 14 March 1524 until his death. In 1537 he invited the Angelic Sisters of Saint Paul to Vicenza, where they received the support of the Valmarana family.

Ridolfi was administrator of Forlì (16 April 1526 - 7 August 1528). During the Sack of Rome (1527) he was taken hostage to Hugo of Moncada with other cardinals. Later he was named administrator of Viterbo (16 November 1532 – 6 June 1533), administrator of the metropolitan see of Salerno (7 February 1533 - 19 December 1548) and administrator of Imola (4 August 1533 - 17 May 1546). Pope Clement VII opted him for the deaconry of Santa Maria in Cosmedin on 19 January 1534. He participated in the Papal conclave, 1534.

Pope Paul III appointed him administrator of Viterbo again (8 August 1538 - 25 May 1548) and opted him for the deaconry of Santa Maria in Via Lata on 31 May 1540 as he became cardinal protodeacon. He was a member of a special commission of eleven cardinals for reform of the Roman Curia. On 8 January 1543 he was named Archbishop of Florence for second time and resigned again on 25 May 1548.

After the death of Pope Paul III he was a papabile, entered the conclave of 1549 - 1550, but left because of illness. He died on 31 January 1550 of an apoplexy before the new Pope Julius III was elected on 7 February 1550. Cardinal Ridolfi was buried in the church of Sant'Agostino.

A patron of the arts, Ridolfi had an extensive collection of books, paintings, and sculpture that passed to his brother Lorenzo. A large armorial pitcher, currently held by the Metropolitan Museum of Art is believed to have been commissioned by Ridolfi on the occasion of Charles V's coronation in Bologna in 1530.

== Bibliography ==
- Byatt, Lucinda M. C. (1988). "The concept of hospitality in a cardinal's household in Renaissance Rome". Renaissance Studies. 2 (2): 312–320. doi:10.1111/j.1477-4658.1988.tb00159.x. JSTOR 24409406. [very tangential, of background value only]
- Byatt, Lucinda (1984). "Il Cardinale Niccolo Ridolfi ed il Palazzo di Bagnaia". Biblioteca e società. 4: 3–8.
- Byatt, Lucinda (1983). Una suprema magnificenza : Niccolo' Ridolfi a Florentine Cardinal in sixteenth-century Rome (Ph.D. thesis). European University Institute. hdl:1814/5809.
- Ridolfi, Roberto (1929). "La biblioteca del cardinale Niccolo Ridolfi (1501-1550)". La Bibliofilia. 31: 173–193.

Catholic Church titles
Preceded by Carlo Domenico del Carretto	Cardinal-Deacon of Santi Vito, Modesto e Crescenzia; 1517–1534	Succeeded by Guido Ascanio Sforza di Santa Fiora
Preceded by Ercole Baglioni	Administrator of Orvieto; 1520–1529	Succeeded by Vincenzo Durante
Preceded by Achille Grassi	Administrator of Pomesania; 1523–1524	Succeeded by Paul Sperato
Preceded by Giulio de' Medici	Archbishop of Florence (1st term); 1524–1532	Succeeded by Andrea de Bondelmonte
Preceded by Francesco Soderini	Administrator of Vicenza; 1524–1550	Succeeded by Angelo Bragadino
Preceded by Leonardo de' Medici	Administrator of Forli; 1526–1528	Succeeded by Bernardo Antonio de' Medici
Preceded by Egidio da Viterbo	Administrator of Viterbo e Tuscania (1st term); 1532–1533	Succeeded by Giampietro Grassi
Preceded by Federico Fregóso	Administrator of Salerno; 1533–1548	Succeeded by Luis Torres (bishop)
Preceded by Domenico Scribonio dei Cerboni	Administrator of Imola; 1533–1546	Succeeded by Girolamo Dandini
Preceded by Franciotto Orsini	Cardinal-Deacon of Santa Maria in Cosmedin; 1534–1540	Succeeded by Guido Ascanio Sforza di Santa Fiora
Preceded by Giampietro Grassi	Administrator of Viterbo e Tuscania (2nd term); 1538–1548	Succeeded by Niccolò di Antonio Ugolini
Preceded by Alessandro Cesarini (seniore)	Cardinal-Deacon of Santa Maria in Via Lata; 1540–1550	Succeeded by Innocenzo Cibo
Preceded by Andrea de Bondelmonte	Archbishop of Florence (2nd term); 1543–1548	Succeeded by Antonio Altoviti
