= François Guillaume de Castelnau-Clermont-Ludève =

French diplomat and cardinal (1480–1541)

His Eminence François Guillaume de Castelnau-Clermont-Lodève
- Cardinal, Bishop of Agde
- Church: Roman Catholic
- In office: 1531–1541
- Other posts: Cardinal-Bishop of Frascati (1523–41); Apostolic Legate in Avignon
- Previous posts: Cardinal-Deacon of Santo Stefano al Monte Celio (1509–23); Cardinal-Deacon of Sant'Adriano al Foro (1503–11)

Orders
- Created cardinal: 29 November 1503 by Pope Julius II

Personal details
- Born: c. 1480
- Died: 13 March 1541 (aged c. 61) Avignon, France
- Parents: Pierre (Tristan), Seigneur de Clermont; Catherine d'Amboise
- Coat of arms: François Guillaume de Castelnau-Clermont-Lodève's coat of arms

François Guillaume de Castelnau de Clermont-Lodève (French: [fʁɑ̃swa ɡijom də klɛʁmɔ̃]; 1480–1541) was a French diplomat and Cardinal. He was the son of Pierre-Tristan, Seigneur de Clermont et de Clermont-Lodève and Vicomte de Nébouzan, and Catherine d'Amboise. His father was a member of the Order of Saint Michael. François' grandmother had been heiress of Dieudonné Guillaume de Clermont. He had an elder brother, Pierre de Castelnau, who was heir to the family estates. François was also the nephew of Cardinal Georges d'Amboise (1498-1510), who was largely responsible for François' swift rise to prominence in the Church. Cardinal d'Amboise had been Archbishop of Narbonne from 1491 to 1494.

== Education and early career ==
Francois de Castelnau was appointed Major Archdeacon of the Church of Narbonne, before 1501, when he was appointed to the diocese of Saint-Pons. He already was Bachelor in Theology. He was appointed Administrator of the diocese of Saint-Pons-de-Thomières on 17 November 1501, for which he required a papal dispensation since he was only twenty-one years old (1502, 1511–14 and 1534–39).

He was elected Archbishop of Narbonne by the Cathedral Chapter on 4 June 1502, an act which was approved by Pope Alexander VI on 22 June 1502. The Pope dispensed François from the age defect, and allowed him to retain the benefices which he had already accumulated. He was already a Canon and Prebend in the Church of Albi, Provost of Belle-monte, and he held two other priories. On 6 December 1502 he was also granted the Priory of Nôtre-Dame de Parco.

== Cardinal ==
On 23 November 1503 he made his first formal entry into the City of Rome, just in time for the Coronation of the new pope. He was created Cardinal by Pope Julius II on 29 November 1503, three days after his Coronation. On 6 December he was appointed Cardinal Deacon of S. Adriano.

He held the diocese of Narbonne until he was appointed Archbishop of Auch on 4 July 1507.

He was named Bishop of Senez in 1508, upon the resignation of Cardinal Nicholas Fieschi, who held the bishopric as Administrator. Cardinal de Castelnau resigned the See in 1509. His successor, Bishop Jean Baptiste de Laigne d'Oraison was confirmed on 19 September 1509.

Cardinal de Castelnau served as Ambassador of King Louis XII of France to Pope Julius II beginning in 1507. On 2 May 1509, the Cardinal was elevated to the rank of Cardinal Priest and assigned the titulus of San Stefano al Monte Celio. Unfortunately, his diplomatic skills were insufficient to deal with the volcanic temper of Pope Julius II. During the War of the League of Cambrai he was too forthcoming in his exchanges with the Pope on behalf of France and its King, and on 29 June 1510, when he demanded his passport, the Pope, in a fit of anger by no means becoming his high office, sent Cardinal de Castelnau instead to detention in the Castel S. Angelo. On the petition of the College of Cardinals he was released from the Castel S. Angelo, but was kept under arrest in the Vatican Palace, but the Pope indicated that he would not be released until the prelates who had been taken prisoner in the capture of Bologna by Louis XII were released. Shortly thereafter, after swearing not to adhere to the Conciliabulum of Pisa, he was given his passport and allowed to return to France.

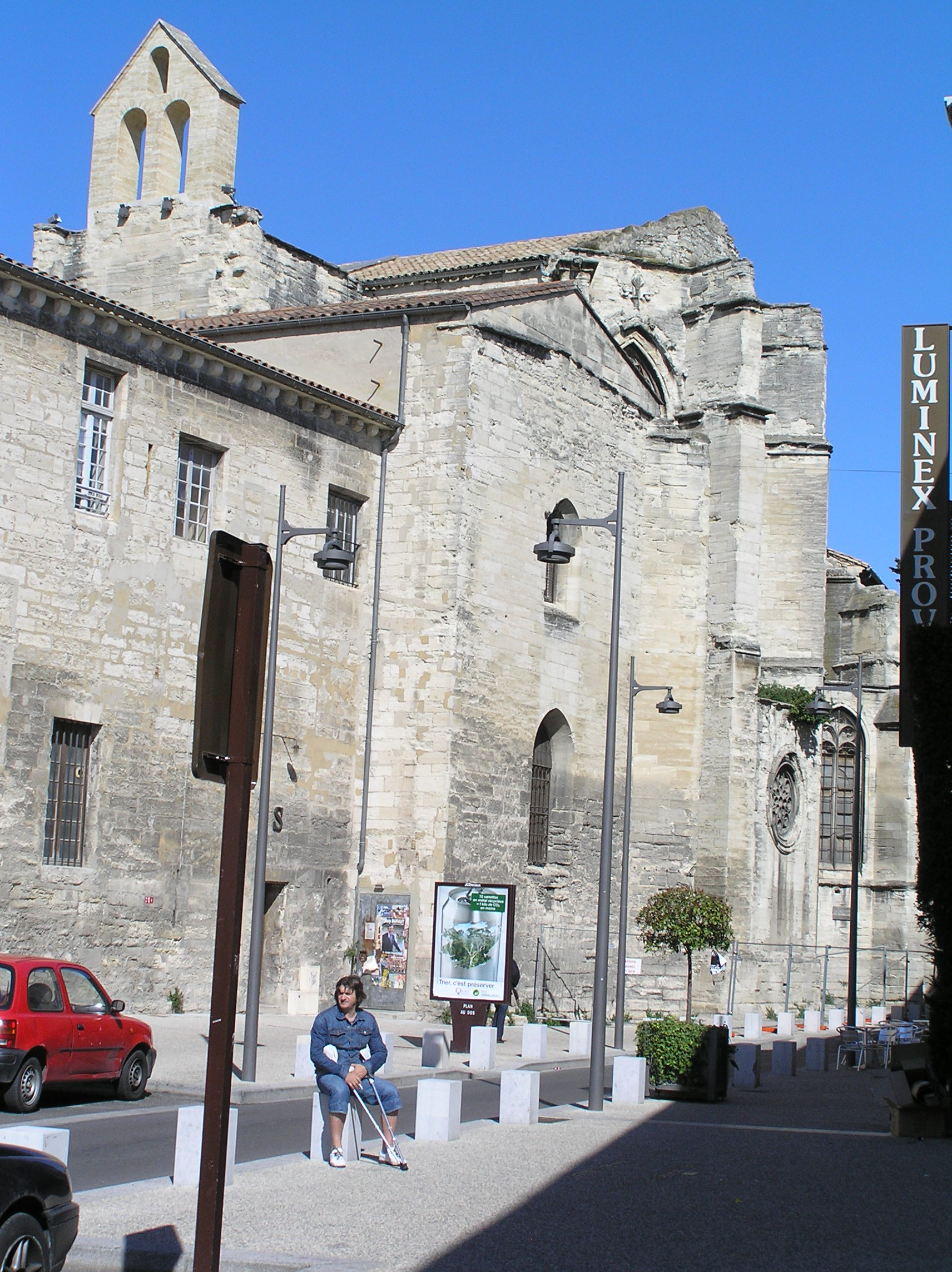
Church of Celestines, Avignon

Cardinal de Castelnau was again appointed Administrator of the diocese of Saint-Pons-de-Thomières on 9 July 1511, and exercised that function until 28 July 1514, when Cardinal Alessandro Farnese was appointed.

Cardinal de Castelnau was Legate in Avignon 1513-1541.

He was Bishop of Valence from 11 January 1523 to 1531; his successor Antoine de Vasc was appointed on 10 May 1531, in an exchange of dioceses of Valence and Agde. Cardinal de Castelnau therefore became Bishop of Agde on 10 May 1531, and held the post until his death.

== Conclave of 1523 ==
François Guillaume de Castelnau participated in the Papal conclave, 1523. Despite his youth (he was forty-three), he was the senior Cardinal priest at the Conclave. He and two French colleagues, Louis de Bourbon de Vendome and Jean de Lorraine, arrived thirty-six days late, on November 6, 1523, missing in addition the nine days of mourning for Adrian VI (Novendiales), and, more importantly, the political discussions that took place during that critical time and the forming of various alliances. The Cardinals who were present, however, were in no hurry. Although the Conclave began on 1 October, they did not complete their Electoral Capitulations until October 5. Voting finally began on 8 October, though during the first two weeks there were only eight Scrutinies. By 25 October voting positions had frozen, and, though votes continued to be taken, there were repeatedly the same results. On 12 November a delegation of Roman gentlemen appeared at the gate of the Conclave and exhorted the Cardinals to get on with their business and elect a pope. On the night of the 17/18 November, the deadlock finally broke, when Cardinal de'Medici threatened to nominate Cardinal Pompeo Colonna's worst enemy, Cardinal Franciotto Orsini. Rather than see that happen, Colonna and his followers joined the faction of Cardinal de'Medici and elected him pope. He chose the name Clement VII, and was crowned at the Vatican Basilica on 26 November 1523. The new Pope named Cardinal de Castelnau bishop of Frascati in December 1523, the vacancy having been created by the promotion of Cardinal Alessandro Farnese to the Bishopric of Palestrina. Being the senior cardinal-priest, Cardinal de Castelnau had the first option on the office.

In 1534 François Guillaume de Castelnau was named the first Abbot Commendatory (the thirty-ninth Abbot) of Saint-Aphrodise in the diocese of Béziers by King Francis I.

From the death of Cardinal Giovanni Piccolomini in 1537 until his own death in March 1541, François Guillaume de Castelnau de Clermont-Lodève was Dean of the College of Cardinals. He was still Bishop of Palestrina, not Bishop of Ostia. The Deanship and the Bishopric of Ostia did not become associated with one another until the reign of Pope Paul IV.

Cardinal François Guillaume de Castelnau-Clermont-Lodève died in Avignon, where he was an Apostolic Legate in March 1541, perhaps on the 13th. He was interred in the Church of the Celestines.

== Bibliography ==
- Aubery, Antoine (1645). Histoire Generalle Des Cardinaux (in French). Vol. Partie III. Paris: Jean Jost. pp. 82–86.
- Eubel, Konrad (1901). Hierarchia catholica medii aevi: 1434-1503 (in Latin). Vol. II. Münster: sumptibus et typis librariae Regensbergianae.
- Fisquet, Honoré Jean Pierre (1864). La France pontificale (Gallia Christiana): Montpellier. Vol. deuxieme partie. Paris: Etienne Repos.
- Grassi, Paride (1886). Luigi Frati (ed.). Le due spedizioni militari di Giulio II: tratte dal diario di Paride Grassi bolognese ... (in Italian and Latin). Bologna: Regia Tipografia.
- Gulik, Guilelmus van; Konrad Eubel (1923). L. Schmitz-Kallenberg (ed.). Hierarchia catholica medii aevi (in Latin). Vol. III (editio altera ed.). Münster: sumptibus et typis librariae Regensbergianae.
- Petruccelli della Gattina, Ferdinando (1864). Histoire diplomatique des conclaves (in French). Vol. Premier volume. Paris: A. Lacroix, Verboeckhoven et cie.
- Sainte-Marthe, Denis; Hauréau, Barthélemy (1715). Gallia Christiana: In Provincias Ecclesiasticas Distributa... Provinciae Albiensis, Aquensis, Avenionenses, Arelatensis, Auxitana (in Latin). Vol. Tomus I. Paris: Typographia Regia.
- Sainte-Marthe, Denis (1739). Gallia Christiana, In Provincias Ecclesiasticas Distributa; Ubi de Provincia Narbonensi (in Latin). Vol. Tomus sextus (VI). Paris: Ex Typographia Regia.
- Shaw, Christine (1993). Julius II: The Warrior Pope. Oxford: Blackwell. ISBN 978-1-909979-20-8.
