= Guillermo Raimundo de Vich y de Vallterra =

Guillermo Raimundo de Vich y de Vallterra (Catalan: Guillem Ramon de Vic i de Vallterra; ? in Valencia, Spain – July 27, 1525) was a cardinal in the Catholic Church.

== Biography ==
Guillén-Ramón de Vich y de Vallterra was born in Valencia sometime between 1460 and 1470, the son of Luis de Vich y de Corbera, seqor of the Valles de Gallinera y Ebo and mestre racional (general controller of accounts) of the Kingdom of Valencia.

Early in his career, he was a protonotary apostolic. His brother, Jerónimo de Vich, had a long embassy in Rome.

Pope Leo X made him a cardinal priest in the consistory of July 1, 1517. He received the red hat and the titular church of San Marcello al Corso on July 6, 1517.

On October 22, 1518, he was named administrator of the see of Cefalù, a post he held until June 7, 1525. He became the coadjutor bishop of Martín García, Bishop of Barcelona, on June 24, 1519; he succeeded as bishop upon the death of Bishop García, taking possession of the see on March 20, 1521. Though he continued to reside at Rome, he held this office until his death. He was consecrated as a bishop in Rome by papal chaplain Paris de Grassis on September 22, 1521.

He participated in both the papal conclave of 1521-22 that elected Pope Adrian VI, and in the papal conclave of 1523 that elected Pope Clement VII.

He died in Casamari Abbey on July 27, 1525. He is buried in Santa Croce in Gerusalemme.

== Bibliography ==
- Cardella, Lorenzo (1793). Memorie storiche de cardinali della Santa romana chiesa (in Italian). Vol. Tomo quarto. Roma: Pagliarini. pp. 50–51.
- Chacón, Alfonso. Vitæ, et res gestæ Pontificvm Romanorum et S. R. E. Cardinalivm ab initio nascentis Ecclesiæ vsque ad Vrbanvm VIII. Pont. Max. 2 volumes. Romae : Typis Vaticanis, 1630, II, col. 1423-1424;
- Eubel, Conradus and Gulik, Guglielmus van. Hierarchia Catholica Medii et Recentioris Aevi. Volumen III (1503-1592). Münich : Sumptibus et Typis Librariae Regensbergianae, 1935; reprint, Padua : Il Messagero di S. Antonio, 1960, pp. 17, 65, 129 and 163;
- Goñi, J. "Vich, Guillén Ramón de." Diccionario de historia eclesiástica de España. 4 vols and Supplement. Dirigido por Quintín Aldea Vaquero, Tomás Marín Martínez, José Vives Gatell. Madrid : Instituto Enrique Flórez, Consejo Superior de Investigaciones Científicas, 1972-1975, IV, 2754-2755;
- Guitarte Izquierdo, Vidal. Episcopologio Español (1500-1699). Españoles obispos en España, América, Filipinas y otros países. Rome : Instituto Español de Historia Eclesiástica, 1994. (Publicaciones del Instituto Español de Historia Eclesiástica; Subsidia; 34), p. 34;
- Villanueva, Jaime; Villanueva, Joaquín Lorenzo. Viage literario á las iglesias de España. 22 vols. Madrid : Imprenta real, 1803-1852. At head of title : Real Academia de la Historia, XVIII, 51-53.
