= Aeci =

Aeci (or Aetius) (died 1010), Bishop of Barcelona from 995, was a warrior-prelate in the age of the Peace and Truce of God. Besides military endeavours, mainly reconquista (the re-conquest of Islamic territory), his episcopate was taken up with the repopulation of the Penedès in the south of the diocese, on the frontier with al-Andalus.

In 997 Aeci, as bishop, received a conditional gift from one Sendred Donús of land at La Boadella and a garden in the burgus (suburbs) of Barcelona. Among Sendred's several stipulations for the bishop was that the sacriscrinius (churchwarden) Bonfill and his successors should not be removed from that post. In the church's cartulary, the Libri antiquitatum, the scribe has called this document a conveniencia (agreement), the earliest use of that spelling, which has persisted in modern Catalan.

Between 1000 and 1002, and again in 1003, the Muslims destroyed the fortified tower (turris) of La Granada, a possession of the see of Barcelona. Twice, in 1005 and 1009, Aeci sold or exchanged ecclesiastical estates in an effort to raise the funds to rebuild it. In 1002 Aeci sent letters to the Roman curia complaining that a certain nobleman named Geribert had seized the castle of Ribes, which rightfully belonged to the bishops of Barcelona. The Papal court responded by sending letters, of apparently no effect, ordering Geribert to hand it back. He was still holding it at the time of his own death, four years after the bishop's, in 1014. In 1005 Aeci was fortunate enough to gain the castle of Barberà, donated by testament to the see.

On 9 March 1009 Aeci founded the pia almoina or casa de la canonja of Barcelona, an "almshouse established at the cathedral church and administered typically by the bishop and chapter". An earlier piece of property which had been donated "to the cathedral, the poor, and pilgrims" by Bishop Vives was devastated by the sack of Barcelona by Almanzor in 985, but in 1009 Aeci donated an estate of his own for the same purpose ("to feed the canons and the poor") and gave it to the restored canonry. There was at that time no "clear distinction between voluntary and involuntary poverty".

Along with his fellow bishops Odó of Girona and Arnulf of Vic, Aeci took part in the razzia led on Córdoba by Ramon Borrell, Count of Barcelona, and Ermengol I, Count of Urgell, in 1010 and died on the battlefield along with Ermengol.
