= Giovanni Battista Pallavicino =

Italian Roman Catholic bishop and cardinal

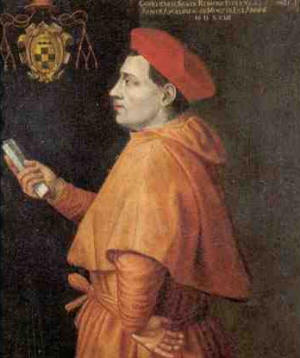
Giovanni Battista Pallavicino

Coat of arms of Cardinal Giovanni Battista Pallavicino

Giovanni Battista Pallavicino (1480–1524) was an Italian Roman Catholic bishop and cardinal.

== Biography ==
Giovanni Battista Pallavicino was born in Genoa in 1480, the son of Cipriano Pallavicino and Bianca Gattilusi. He was the nephew of Cardinal Antonio Pallavicini Gentili.

His uncle directed his education. He received a doctorate in law from the University of Padua.

He became the dean of the cathedral chapter of Ourense Cathedral.

On November 22, 1507, he was elected Bishop of Cavaillon. He occupied this see until his death. In 1511, he became a scriptor of apostolic letters. He participated in the Fifth Council of the Lateran in 1512. In 1513, he became an abbreviator. On March 17, 1514, he became a canon of the cathedral chapter of Como Cathedral.

Pope Leo X made him a cardinal priest in the consistory of July 1, 1517. He received the red hat and the titular church of Sant'Apollinare alle Terme Neroniane-Alessandrine on July 6, 1517.

He participated in both the papal conclave of 1521-22 that elected Pope Adrian VI, and in the papal conclave of 1523 that elected Pope Clement VII.

He died in Rome on August 13, 1524. He was buried in Santa Maria del Popolo.
