= Ramón Daumal Serra =

Pablo Barrachina Estevan
- Auxiliary Bishop Diocese of Barcelona (Emeritus)
- Church: Roman Catholic Church
- See: Diocese of Barcelona
- In office: 1968–1987
- Previous post(s): Priest

Orders
- Ordination: July 30, 1939

Personal details
- Born: April 3, 1912; Badalona, Spain
- Died: February 10, 2008 (aged 95); Badalona, Spain

Ramón Daumal Serra (April 3, 1912 – February 10, 2008) was a Spanish Bishop of the Roman Catholic Church.

Serra was born in Badalona, Spain and was ordained a priest on July 30, 1939, of the Diocese of Barcelona. He was appointed Auxiliary bishop of the Diocese of Barcelona as well as Titular bishop of Mathara in Proconsulari on October 22, 1969, and ordained a bishop December 14, 1968. Serra retired as Auxiliary bishop of Diocese of Barcelona on October 30, 1987.

Serra died on February 10, 2008, at age of 95.

== See also ==
- Diocese of Barcelona
