= Arnau de Gurb =

Bishop of Barcelona and diplomat

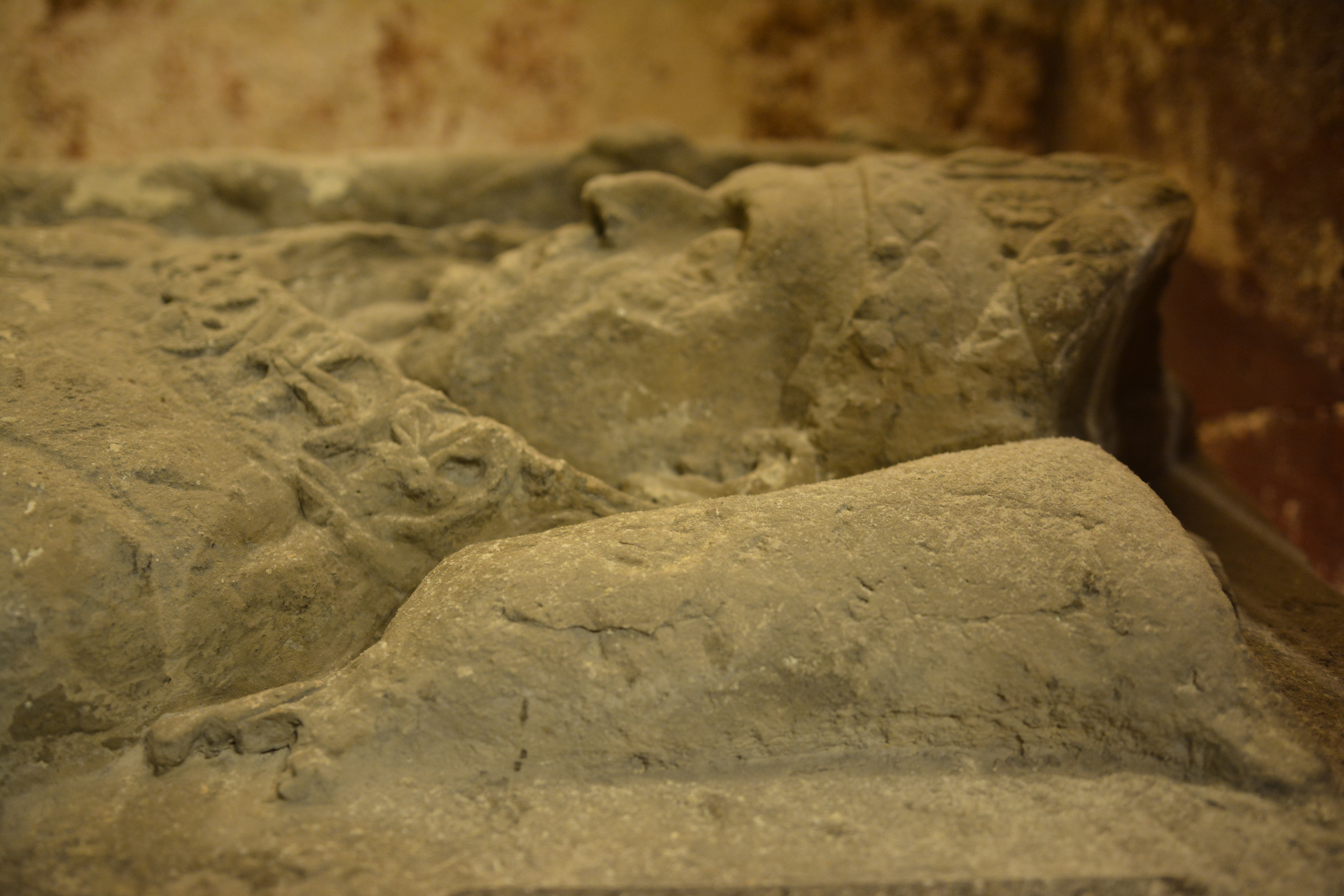
Image of Bishop Arnau de Gurb on his tomb. Santa Llúcia Chapel, Cathedral of Barcelona

Arnau de Gurb (in Spanish, Arnoldo de Guerbo) was bishop of Barcelona from 1252 to 1284. He had served as a canon at the cathedral of Vic and later as primary archdeacon in Barcelona. As bishop, he expanded the episcopal palace, and built the Chapel of Santa Llúcia (Saint Lucy) in the cathedral of Barcelona. With James II of Aragon, he participated in the conquest of the kingdom of Murcia. He served as ambassador to the French court. He was close with Saint Raymond of Peñafort and promoted the cult of the Immaculate Conception.

He participated in the Disputation of Barcelona. James I of Aragon had appointed a censorship commission to remove the passages perceived offensive from the Talmud. It consisted of De Gurb, Raymond de Peñafort, and the Dominicans Arnoldo de Segarra, Pedro de Janua and Ramón Martí (author of Pugio Fidei).

His body rests in a mausoleum in the Chapel of Santa Llúcia in the Cathedral of Barcelona.

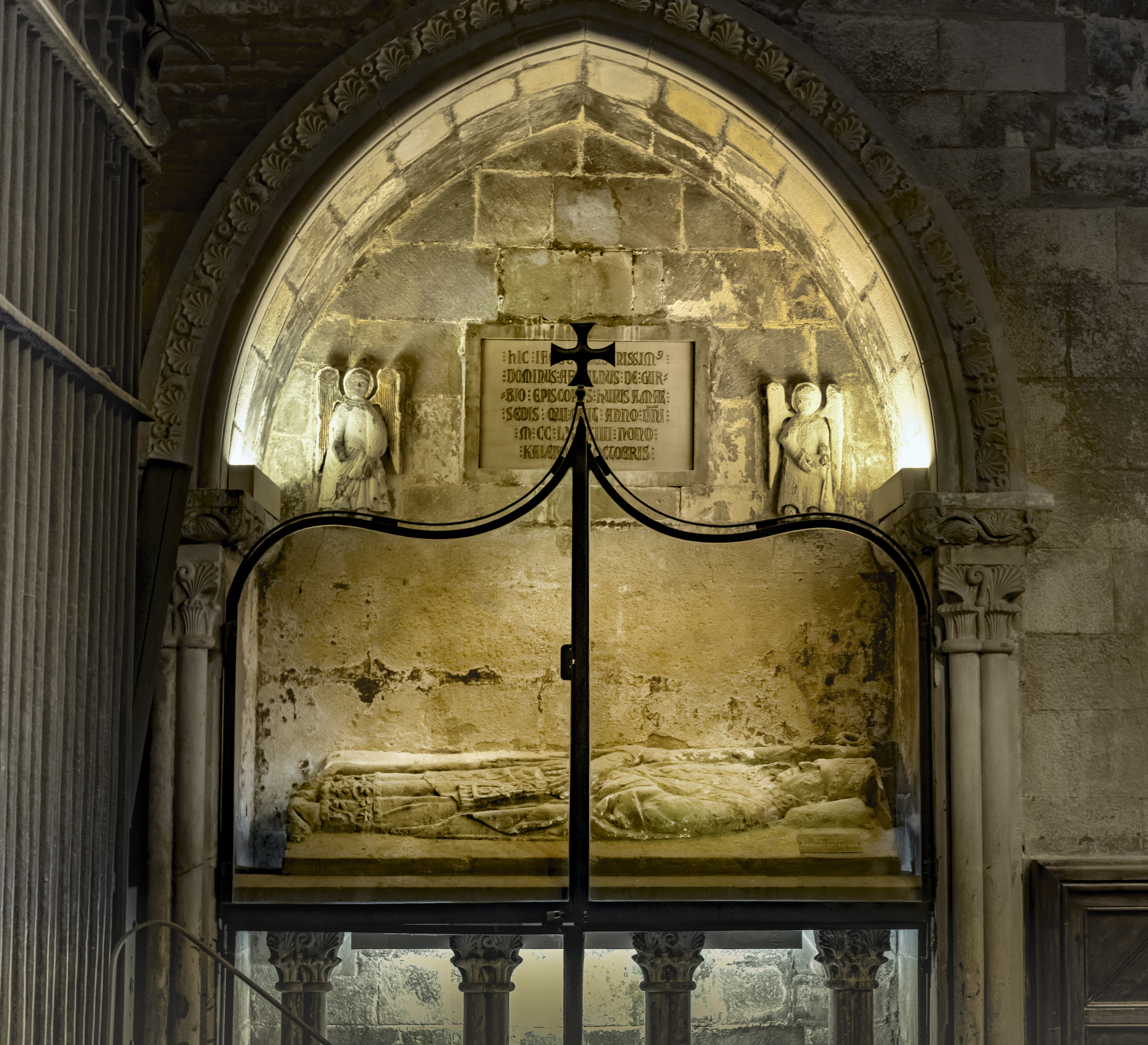
Mausoleum of Arnau de Gurb.
