= Antoni Vadell Ferrer =

Spanish catholic bishop (1972–2022)

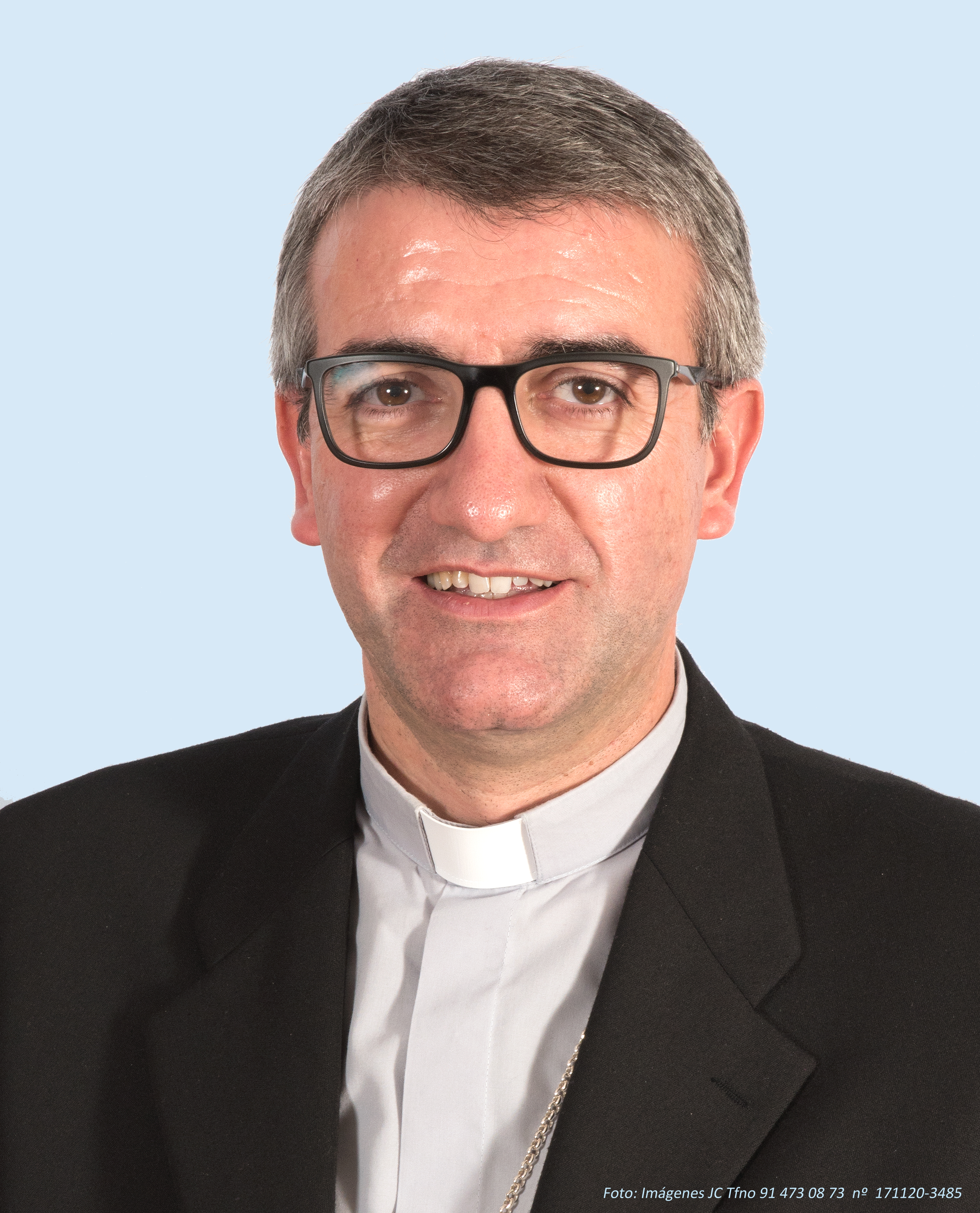

Antoni Vadell i Ferrer (17 May 1972 – 12 February 2022) was a Spanish Roman Catholic prelate.

He was born in Llucmajor in the Balearic Islands, Spain. He became a priest in 1998. In 2017, he became the Auxiliary Bishop of Barcelona.

Vadell Ferrer died from pancreatic cancer in Barcelona on 12 February 2022, at the age of 49.
