= Severus of Barcelona =

Saint Severus of Barcelona
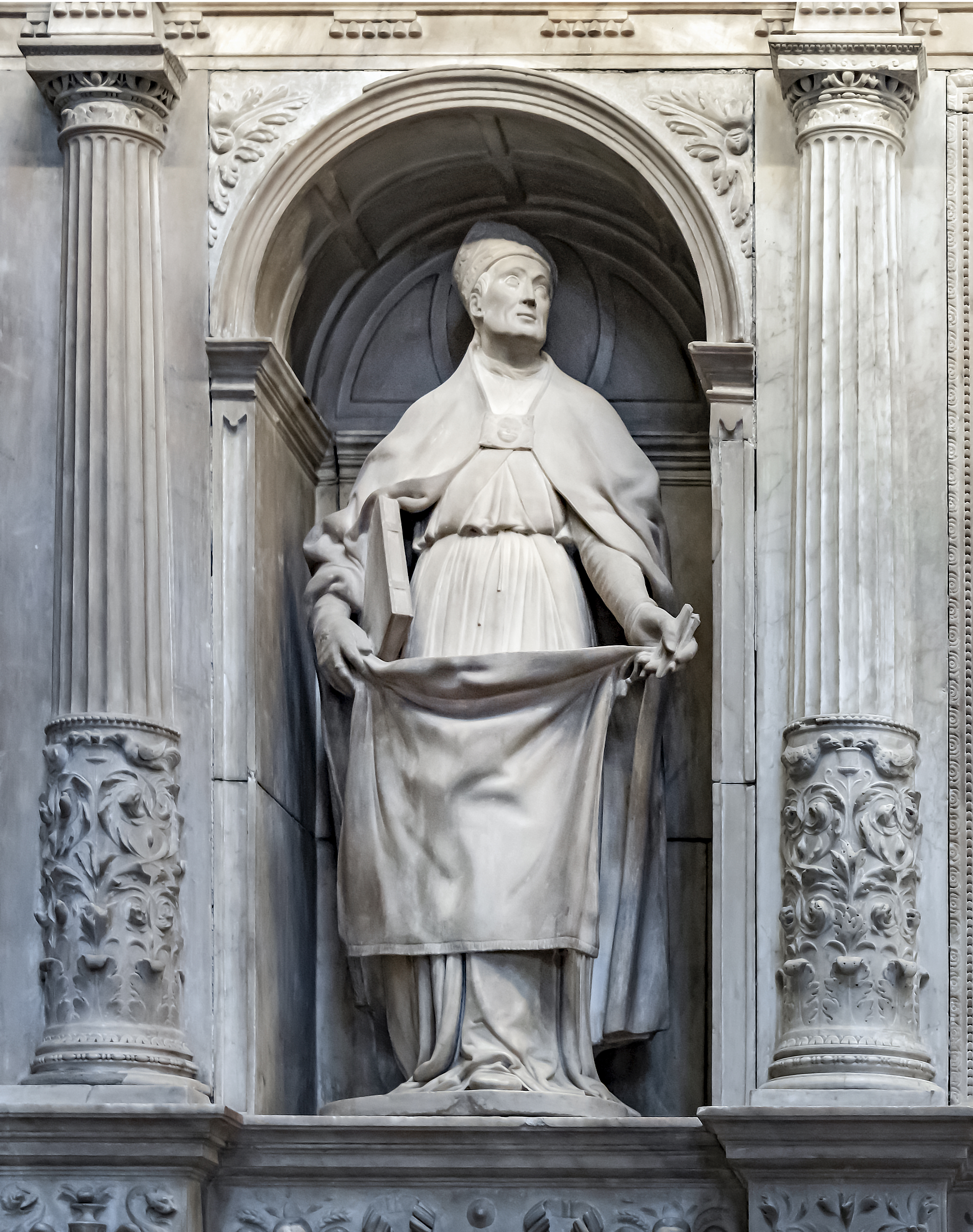
- Statue of Saint Severus Barcelona cathedral
- Born: Barcelona
- Died: 304
- Venerated in: Roman Catholic Church, Eastern Orthodox Church
- Feast: 6 November
- Attributes: bishop with a nail or nails driven into his head
- Patronage: Barcelona

Severus of Barcelona (Catalan: Sant Sever; Spanish: San Severo) is venerated as a saint by the Catholic and Eastern Orthodox churches. His legend states that he was a bishop of Barcelona and was martyred during the persecution of Christians by Diocletian in AD 304. Details concerning his life and death are uncertain and of questionable historicity.

== Narrative ==
The only documented Severus of Barcelona was known as Severus II of Barcelona and lived in the 7th century. He was represented by a priest at the Fourth Council of Toledo in 633, but died shortly thereafter. This Severus is not known to have suffered a violent death.

The 3rd-4th-century Severus is, in any case, a traditional or legendary figure in Catalonia and one of the "lesser patron saints" of the Cathedral of Barcelona. For centuries his saint day was a festivity in Catalonia.

== Legend ==
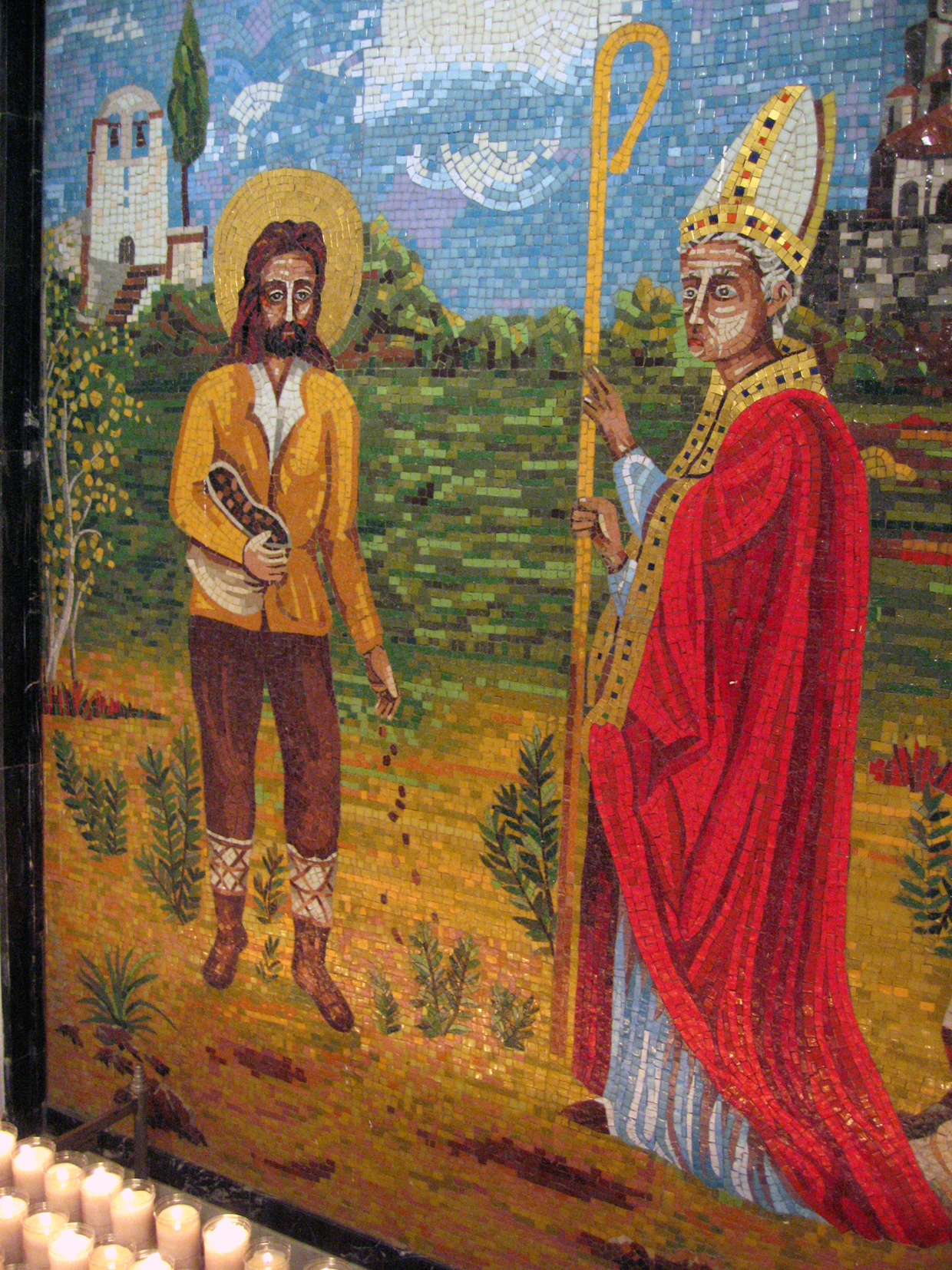
Severus and Emeterius (Medir). The miracle of the fields. Hermitage of Sant Medir, Sant Cugat

According to his legend, he was born in Barcelona to a noble family and received a good education. In a hymn associated with his office, it is stated explicitly that he was a citizen of Barcelona. A variant of the legend status that he was a humble weaver upon whose head a dove landed. The people of the city saw this as a sign and elected him bishop.

He was chosen bishop of Barcelona around 290. During the persecution of Diocletian, Severus fled to Castrum Octavianum (Sant Cugat del Vallès). As he crossed the Collserola Mountains, he encountered a fellow Christian, named Emeterius (Catalan: Sant Medir, Medí, Spanish: San Medir, Medín), sowing broad beans in the field. Severus instructed the man that if the soldiers sent to kill him asked the farmer where he had gone, to tell them that he had passed this way.

A miracle made the beans he was cultivating sprout immediately after Severus left. When the soldiers came across Emeterius and asked him if he had seen the bishop, Emeterius replied that he had and it was when he was sowing the fields. Angry at this lie and believing that Emeterius was mocking them, the soldiers arrested the man and took him to Castrum Octavianum.

Severus meanwhile appeared to the soldiers, along with four other priests from Barcelona who had fled with him. Severus and the four priests were beheaded; Emeterius also suffered this fate.

Another tradition says that Severus was martyred by later Arian Visigoths who drove a nail into his head.

== Veneration ==
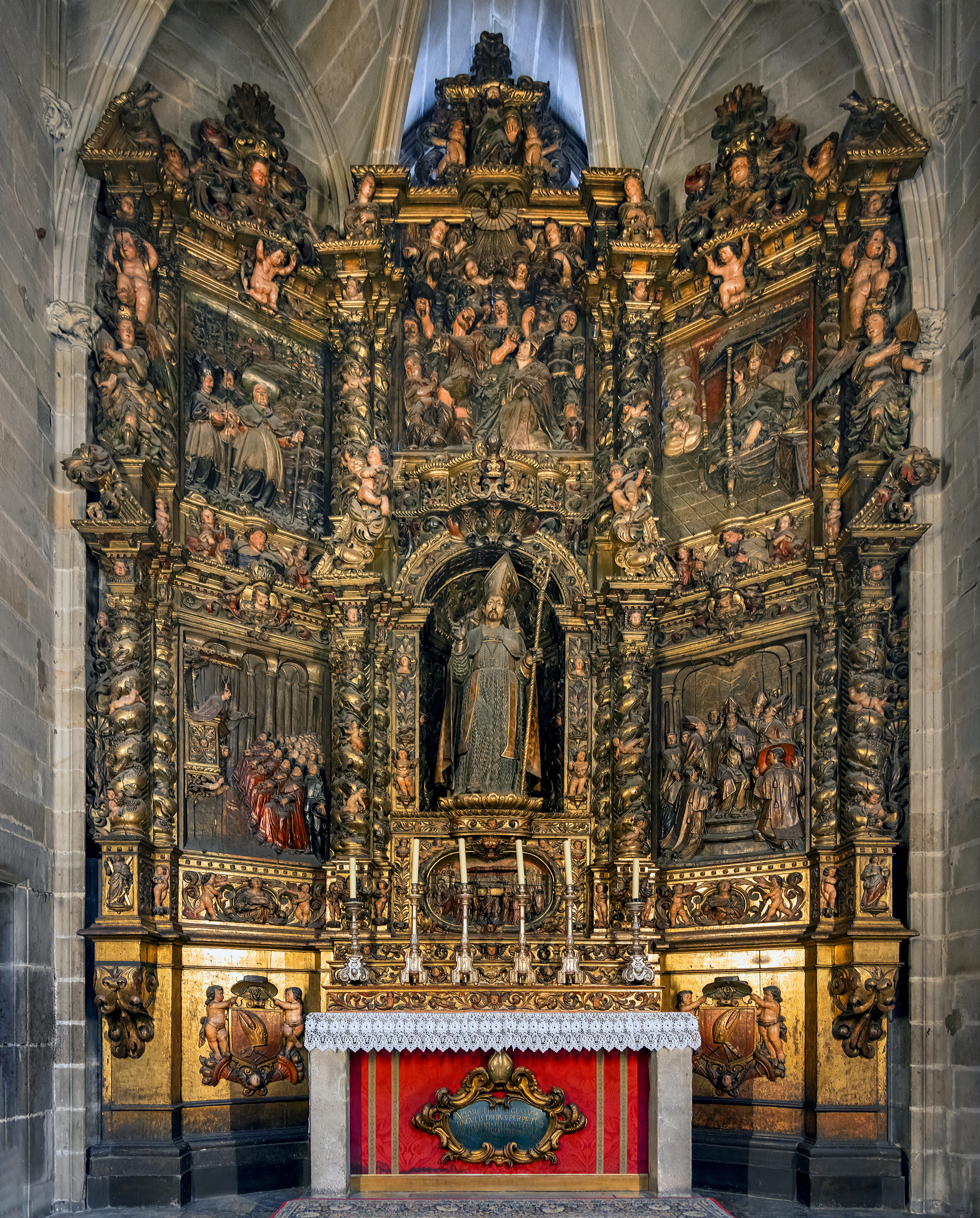
Altar of Saint Severus. Cathedral of Barcelona. Francesc Santacruz.

Some sources state that Severus' relics were buried at Sant Cugat, where a church dedicated to him was built. A monastery, the one that stands there today, was built alongside the church. When that church was destroyed, Severus’ relics were translated to the monastery. In the fifteenth century, some of the relics were taken to Barcelona, to which were attributed various miracles, including curing King Martin I of gangrene in his leg. The Baroque church of Sant Sever, near the Cathedral of Barcelona, was dedicated to him.

The Church of Sant Pere Nolasc, in Barcelona was originally dedicated to Saints Severus and Charles Borromeo but renamed when the Mercedarians took it over.

== Saint Medir ==
The hermitage of Sant Medir, near Sant Cugat, is dedicated to Emeterius. It dates back to the tenth century. It is a small Romanesque church with a bell tower above the entrance. Every year on March 3 la festa més dolça —the sweetest festival- is celebrated in various neighborhoods of Barcelona in honor of Saint Medir. The tradition started in 1828 with a pilgrimage to l’ermita de Sant Medir. A statue of Sant Medir is brought from the church in Sant Cugat and paraded to the Barcelona neighborhood of Gràcia. As they return, the pilgrims toss candy in lieu of broad beans to the crowds that line the streets.

This is not the legionary Saint Emeterius, who was martyred with Celedonius in Calahorra.
