= Alessandro Cesarini =

Italian cardinal

- Cardinal-Bishop of Palestrina
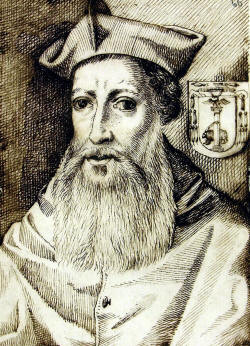
- Church: Catholic Church
- Diocese: Suburbicarian Diocese of Palestrina
- In office: 14 November 1541 – 13 February 1542
- Predecessor: Gianvincenzo Carafa
- Successor: Francesco Cornaro
- Other post: Administrator of Cuenca (1538-1542)
- Previous posts: Cardinal-Bishop of Albano (1540-1541); Cardinal-Deacon of Santa Maria in Via Lata (1523-1540); Administrator of Oppido Mamertina (1536-1538); Administrator of Gerace (1534-1538); Administrator of Pamplona (1520-1538); Administrator of Catanzaro (1536); Administrator of Otranto (1526-1536); Administrator of Alessano (1526-1531); Cardinal-Deacon of Santi Sergio e Bacco (1517-1523); Administrator of Gerace (1519)

Orders
- Created cardinal: 1 July 1517 by Pope Leo X

Personal details
- Born: Rome, Papal States
- Died: 13 February 1542 Rome, Papal States
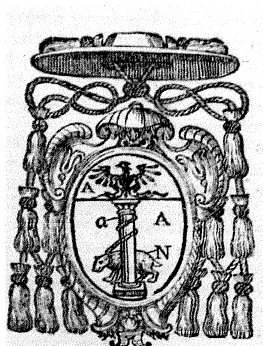
- Coat of arms: Alessandro Cesarini's coat of arms

Alessandro Cesarini (died 13 February 1542), bishop of Pistoia, was an Italian cardinal of the Roman Catholic Church.

== Life ==
Born in Rome, the son of Agabito Cesarini, he became close to the Medici family, particularly Cardinal Giovanni di Lorenzo de' Medici, the future Pope Leo X. He was made cardinal deacon on 1 July 1517 and received the deaconry of Sts. Sergius and Bacchus, opting for the deaconry of Santa Maria in Via Lata in 1523. He became known for his patronage of writers and artists.

He served as apostolic administrator of Pamplona, Spain from 1520 to 1538; that of Alessano, Italy from 1526 to 1531; that of Otranto, Italy from 1526 to 1536; that of Gerace, Italy from 1536 to 1538; that of Catanzaro, Italy briefly in 1536; that of Oppido Mamertina, Italy from 1536 to 1538 (resigning in favor of his natural son, Ascanio Cesarini, who succeeded him in that see from 1538 to 1542); that of Jaën from 6 July 1537 to 14 June 1538; and that of Cuenca, Spain from 1538 to his death.

In the sack of Rome by mutinous troops of Charles V in 1527, he was one of the cardinals held hostage.

He participated in the conclave of 1521–1522, which elected Adrian VI; of 1523, which elected Clement VII; and of 1534, which elected Paul III.

He became cardinal bishop and chose the suburbicarian see of Albano, Italy in 1540.

He was appointed bishop of Palestrina, Italy in 1541, in which office he died on 13 February 1542 in Rome. He was buried in his family's tomb in the church of Santa Maria in Aracoeli in Rome.

Catholic Church titles
Preceded by Giovanni Stefano Ferrero	Cardinal-Deacon of Santi Sergio e Bacco; 1517–1523	Succeeded by Odet de Coligny de Châtillon
Preceded by Francesco Armellini Pantalassi de' Medici	Administrator of Gerace (1st time); 1519	Succeeded by Girolamo Planca
Preceded by Amanieu d'Albret	Administrator of Pamplona; 1520–1538	Succeeded by Juan Reina
Preceded by Marco Cornaro	Cardinal-Deacon of Santa Maria in Via Lata; 1523–1540	Succeeded by Niccolò Ridolfi
Preceded by Fabrizio Di Capua	Administrator of Otranto; 1526–1536	Succeeded by Pietro Antonio Di Capua
Preceded by Agostino Trivulzio	Administrator of Alessano; 1526–1531	Succeeded by Francesco Antonio Balduini
Preceded by Girolamo Planca	Administrator of Gerace (2nd time); 1534–1538	Succeeded by Tiberio Muti
Preceded by Angelo Geraldini d'Amelia	Administrator of Catanzaro; 1536	Succeeded by Sforza Geraldini d'Amelia
Preceded by Pietro Andrea Ripanti	Administrator of Oppido Mamertina; 1536–1538	Succeeded by Ascanio Cesarini
Preceded by Diego Ramírez de Villaescua de Haro	Administrator of Cuenca; 1538–1542	Succeeded by Sebastián Ramírez de Fuenleal
Preceded by Matthäus Lang von Wellenburg	Cardinal-Bishop of Albano; 1540–1541	Succeeded by Francesco Cornaro
Preceded by Gianvincenzo Carafa	Cardinal-Bishop of Palestrina; 1541–1542	Succeeded by Francesco Cornaro
