= Josep Climent i Avinent =

Spanish bishop

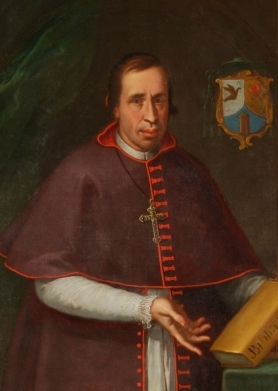
Portrait of José Climent y Avinent in the University of Valencia, attributed to José Vergara Gimeno

Josep Climent i Avinent (also known as José Climent; 11 March 1706 – 25 November 1781) was a Spanish bishop of Barcelona.

== Life ==
Born at Castellón de la Plana, Valencia, he studied and afterwards professed theology at the University of Valencia, worked for several years as parish priest, and was consecrated Bishop of Barcelona in 1766; he resigned his see in 1775.

His episcopal activity was directed to the founding of hospitals, the establishing of free schools, and the diffusion of knowledge among the people by means of low-priced publications. His controversial pastoral instructions contributed largely to his reputation. That of 1769, on the renewal of ecclesiastical studies, caused him to be denounced to the court of Charles III of Spain for having eulogized the Church of Utrecht; but a commission composed of archbishops, bishops, and heads of religious orders, appointed to examine his case, returned a decision favourable to him. The sway he held over his people was shown by his success in quelling an uprising in Barcelona against military conscription; but this only served still further to render him suspect to the suspicious court.

He refused, on conscientious grounds, a promotion to the wealthy See of Málaga, and withdrew to his native place. His life was published in Barcelona in 1785.

He died at Castellón de la Plana in 1781.

== Works ==
He translated into Spanish several works, among them Fleury's Moeurs des Israelites et des Chrétiens.
