= Achille Grassi =

Italian Roman Catholic bishop and cardinal

The Most Reverend Achille Grassi
- Bishop of Città di Castello
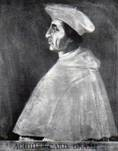
- Church: Roman Catholic
- Diocese: Città di Castello
- Appointed: 14 February 1506
- In office: 1506-1511
- Successor: Baldassarre Grassi

Orders
- Consecration: 13 February 1506 by Pope Julius II
- Created cardinal: 10 March 1511 by Pope Julius II

Personal details
- Born: February 16, 1456 Bologna
- Died: November 22, 1523 (aged 67) Rome
- Buried: Santa Maria in Trastevere

Achille Grassi (16 February 1456 – 22 November 1523) was an Italian Roman Catholic bishop and cardinal.

== Biography ==
Achille Grassi was born in Bologna on 16 February 1456, the son of Baldassarre Grassi, a Bolognese patrician, and Orsina Bocchi.

He attended the University of Bologna, becoming a doctor of both laws in 1478. He was also a canon of the cathedral chapter of Bologna Cathedral.

He then travelled to Rome, joining his uncle Antonio, who was an auditor of the Roman Rota. When his uncle died in 1491, Pope Innocent VIII appointed him an auditor of the Roman Rota. In 1503, he became a chaplain of Pope Julius II. The pope also named him rector of San Clemente, San Giovanni in Persiceto. He then became a Referendary in the Roman Curia.

He was consecrated as a bishop in Rome by Pope Julius II on 13 February 1506. The next day, he was elected Bishop of Città di Castello. He occupied this see until 1516, when he resigned in favour of Cardinal Giulio de' Medici, the future Pope Clement VII.

In 1507, the pope sent him and Cardinal Antonio Pallavicini Gentili as nuncios to Louis XII of France, who was then in Genoa, to encourage him to make peace with Maximilian I, Holy Roman Emperor. In 1508, after Giovanni II Bentivoglio's plot to poison the pope was discovered, Grassi was despatched to the Kingdom of France to ask Louis XII to withdraw his protection of Bentivoglio; Bishop Grassi was successful in carrying out this mission. In 1509, he was nuncio to Switzerland, especially Bern to acquire soldiers for use in the War of the League of Cambrai. In 1510, he was nuncio to the Emperor, Vladislaus II of Bohemia and Hungary, and Sigismund I the Old asking for troops to use against the Ottoman Empire and addressing other issues facing the Kingdom of Poland.

Pope Julius II made him a cardinal priest in the consistory of 10 March 1511. He received the red hat on 13 March 1511 and the titular church of San Sisto Vecchio on 17 March 1511.

On 30 May 1511, he was transferred to the see of Bologna; he occupied this see until 8 January 1518, when he resigned in favour of Cardinal Giulio de' Medici. He remained administrator of the see for the rest of his life.

He participated in the papal conclave of 1513 that elected Pope Leo X. In November 1514, the new pope named him legate extraordinary to the Kingdom of England. He opted for the titular church of Santa Maria in Trastevere on 6 July 1517. He was Camerlengo of the Sacred College of Cardinals from 1517 to 8 January 1518. He was named also bishop of Pomesania on 9 August 1521; he occupied this see until his death.

He participated in both the papal conclave of 1521-22 that elected Pope Adrian VI and the papal conclave of 1523 that elected Pope Clement VII.

He died in Rome on 22 November 1523, three days after the election of Pope Clement VII. He was buried in Santa Maria in Trastevere.
