= Archdiocese of Barcelona =

Roman Catholic archdiocese in Spain

Coordinates: 41°23′02″N 2°10′35″E

Metropolitan Archdiocese of Barcelona Archidioecesis Metropolitae Barcinonensis Archidiócesis Metropolitano de Barcelona (es) Arxidiòcesi Metropolitano de Barcelona (ca)

Catholic
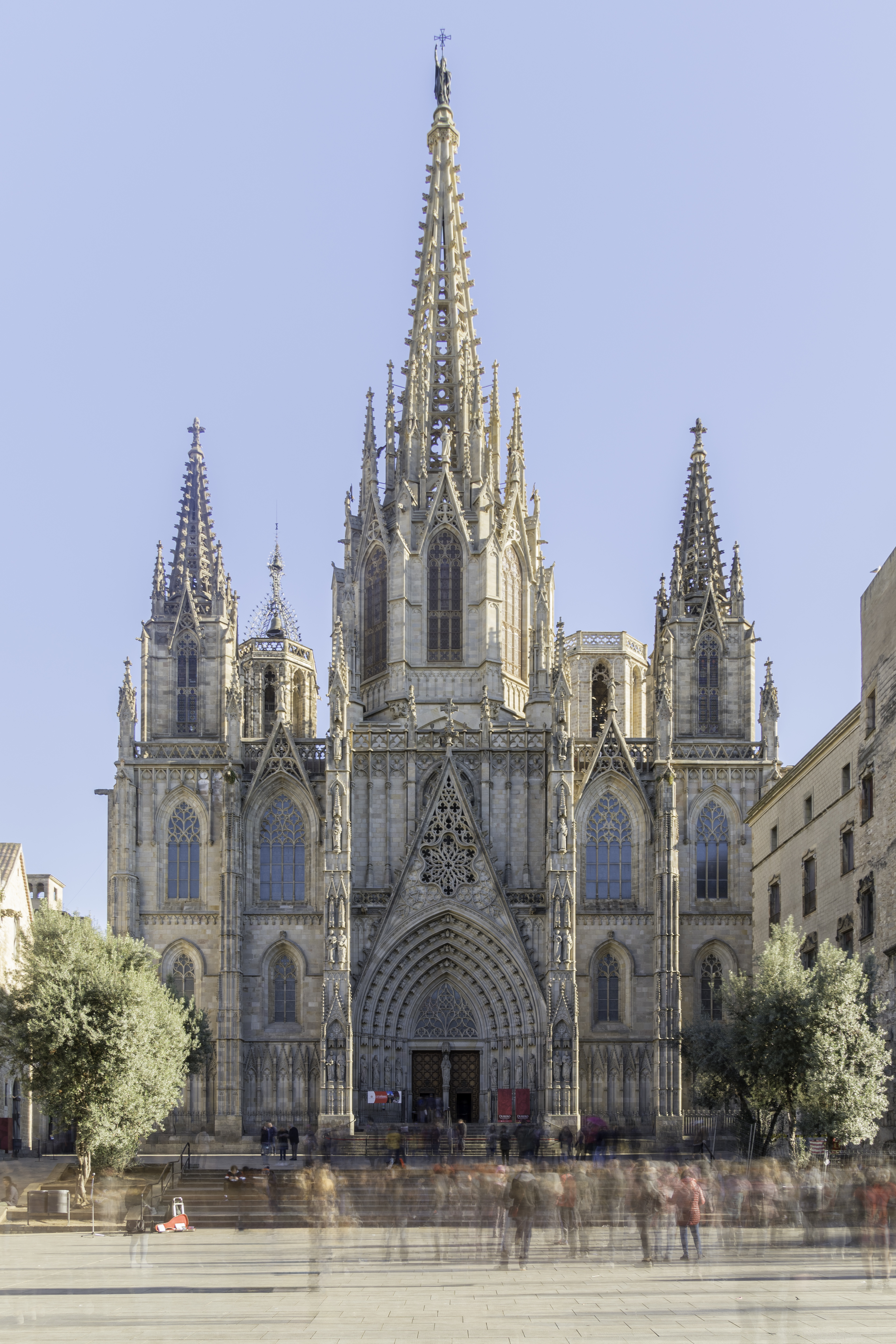
- Barcelona Cathedral

- Coat of arms

Location
- Country: Spain
- Ecclesiastical province: Barcelona

Statistics
- Area: 339 km^{2} (131 sq mi)
- Population: Total; Catholics: (as of 2016); 2,643,620; 2,105,820 (79.7%)

Information
- Rite: Roman Rite
- Cathedral: Catedral Basílica Metropolitana de Santa Creu i Santa Eulàlia (Metropolitan Cathedral-Basilica of the Holy Cross and Saint Eulalia)
- Patron saint: Virgin of Mercy

Current leadership
- Pope: Leo XIV
- Metropolitan Archbishop-designate: Octavi Vilà Mayo
- Auxiliary Bishops: David Abadías Aurín; Javier Vilanova Pellisa
- Bishops emeritus: Lluís Martínez Sistach; Juan José Omella Omella

Map
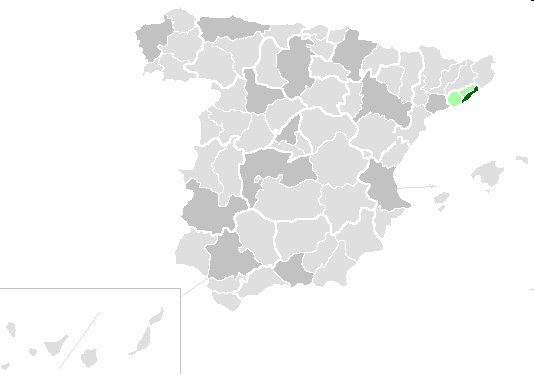

Website
- Website of the Archdiocese

The Metropolitan Archdiocese of Barcelona (Latin: Archidioecesis Metropolitae Barcinonensis) is a Latin metropolitan archbishopric of the Catholic Church in northeastern Spain's Catalonia region.

The cathedral archiepiscopal see is a Minor basilica: Catedral Basílica Metropolitana de la Santa Creu i Santa Eulàlia, Barcelona. The archbishopric has nine more Minor basilicas.

The current metropolitan archbishop of Barcelona is Mons. Don. Fra Octavi Vilà Mayo, O. Cist., appointed by Pope Leo XIV on 11 November 2026.

== Province ==
The ecclesiastical province of Barcelona includes the Metropolitan's own archbishopric and the following suffragan sees :

- Roman Catholic Diocese of Sant Feliu de Llobregat
- Roman Catholic Diocese of Terrassa.

== Statistics ==
As per 2014, it pastorally served 2,116,479 Catholics (79.7% of 2,657,000 total) on 340 km² in 214 parishes and 153 missions with 826 priests (396 diocesan, 430 religious), 46 deacons, 3,092 lay religious (639 brothers, 2,453 sisters) and 19 seminarians.

== History ==
While local tradition and catalogues date back the first bishop, Sant Eteri, considered a disciple of Saint James the Great, to the very first Apostles, historical evidence seems to be undisputed from the third century onwards, when bishop Pretextat attended the Council of Sardica in 343. During the Visigothic Kingdom, Barcelona became one of the fourteen dioceses of the ecclesiastic province of Tarragona.

Circa 450 it lost territory to establish the Diocese of Egara, which it regained circa 700 at the suppression of that Diocese of Egara

After the Christian fall in 712, a long sede vacante was ended not before 850, when bishop Joan took office, and the diocese became subjugated to the Carolingian See of Narbonne.

During the Reconquista, bishop Oleguer was called to the archepiscopal see of Tarragona, which he took in 1017, though being granted to keep his Barcelonan see as well, reigning 1114–1137. Barcelona became suffragan to Tarragona once again, and stayed so for the following centuries.

- In 1237 it lost Balearic territory to establish the Diocese of Mallorca

Its bishops got used to live in the pontifical or royal courts instead of the city, until bishop Jaume Caçador inducted reforms according to the Council of Trent amidst the 16th century. Disregarding another year-lasting de facto sede vacante from 1808 to 1814 during the Napoleonic Wars, Barcelona and its diocese kept on growing richer and more powerful.

- On 25 March 1964 Pope Paul VI elevated the Diocese to the level of non-Metropolitan Archdiocese of Barcelona.
- However, it has only had the status of a Metropolitan Archdiocese since 2004, when Pope John Paul II dismembered its territory into the Archdiocese of Barcelona and the two new suffraganes of Sant Feliu de Llobregat and Terrassa together with the appointment of Archbishop Sistach.
- It enjoyed Papal visits from Pope John Paul II in February 1982 and Pope Benedict XVI in November 2010.

== List of bishops ==
=== Suffragan Bishopric ===
Earliest bishops according to local tradition

The Catholic Encyclopedia states that “The See of Barcelona, unlike most very ancient sees, whose origins are obscure, has preserved catalogues of its bishops from Apostolic times, and although all the names given cannot be admitted as authentic, the greater number are handed down in all the catalogues.” The list includes:

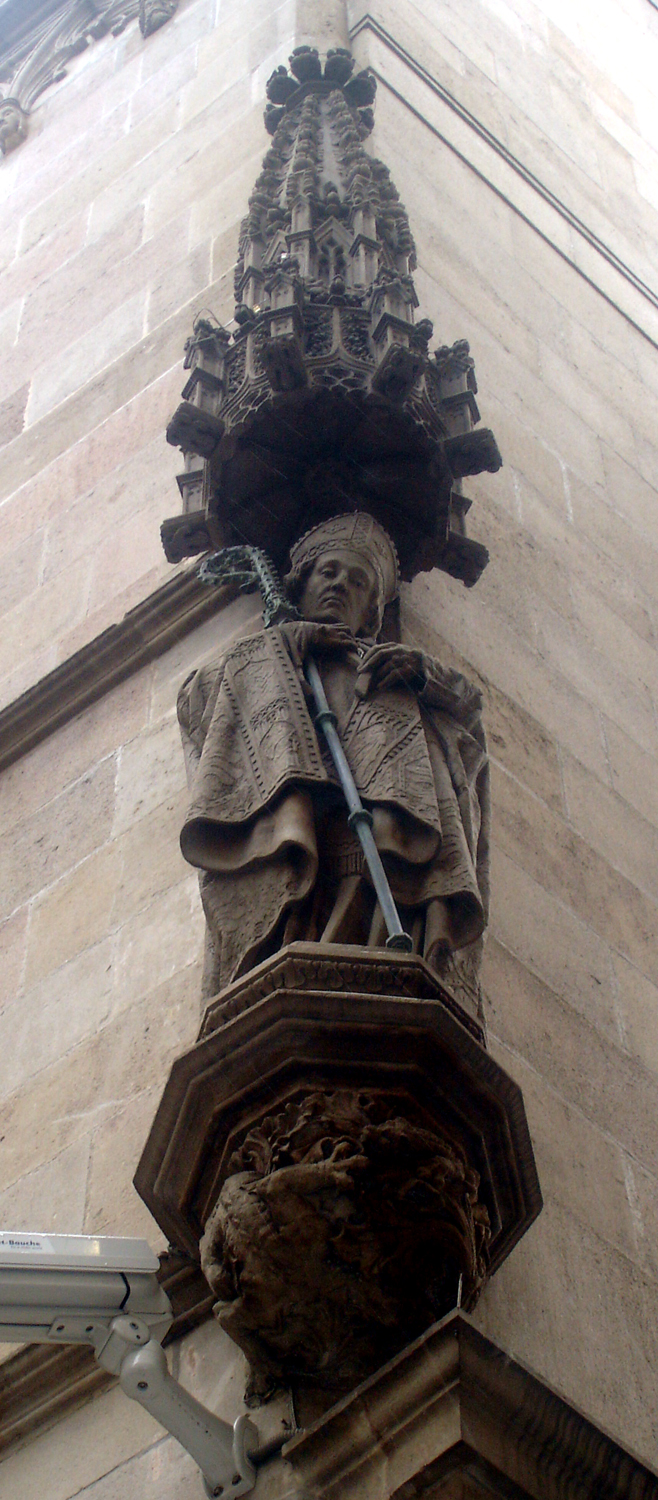
Severus is considered to have occupied the see around 304 AD.

- Eterius (Sant Eteri) (considered a disciple of Saint James the Great, 37 AD)
- Saint Theodosius (Sant Teodosi) (94 AD)
- Aulus Victor (Aulo Víctor) (139 AD)
- Actius
- Theolycus (Teolicus)
- Alexander I (Alexandre I)
- Lucius (Luci)
- Totxa
- Deodatus I (Deodat I)
- Theodoric (Teodoric)
- Deodatus II (Deodat II)
- Peneguardus (Peneguardo)
- Pusio
- Alexander II (Alexandre II)
- Albert
- Armengald
- Gandimar
- William (Guillem)
- St. Severus (Sant Sever) (c. 290–304). A native of the city, martyr of the Diocletian persecution.

Early Suffragan bishops (for whom documentation exists)

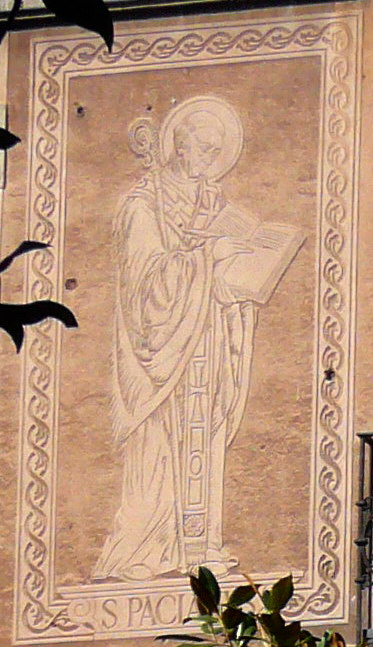
St. Pacian

- Praetextatus (Pretextat) (c. 347), the first recorded bishop, who attended a council at Sardica in 347.
- St. Pacianus (Sant Pacià) (360–390) (mentioned in Jerome's De Viris Illustribus)
- Lampius (Lampi, Lampio) (393–400)
- Sigesari (c. 415)
- Nundinari (c. 450–463)
- Ireneus (Ireneu) (c. 463–465)
- Berengari
- Agrici (after 516)
- St. Nebridius (Nebridi) (c. 540)
- Paternus (Patern) (c. 546)
- Ugno (c. 589–599)
- Emila (c. 610–633)
- Severus II (Sever II) (c. 633–636)
- Oia (c. 636–638)
- Quiricus (Quirze) (c. 640–666), later bishop of Toledo
- Idalaci (c. 667–689)
- Laülf (c. 689–702)

Medieval Period

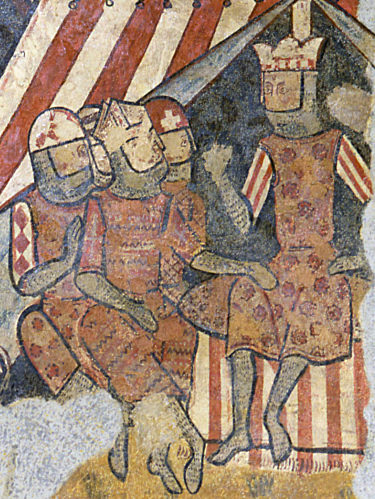
Bishop of Barcelona Berenguer de Palou II (seated) with James I of Aragon

- John (Joan) (around 850)
- Ataulfus (Ataülf) (c. 850–860)
- Frodoí (c. 861–890)
- Theodoric (Teodoric) (c. 904–937)
- Guilara (c. 937–959)
- Pere (c. 962–973)
- Vives (974–995)
- Aeci (995–1010)
- Deusdat (1010–1029)
- Guadall Domnuç (1029–1035)
- Guislabert (1035–1062)
- Berenguer (1062–1069)
- Humbert (Umbert) (1069–1085)
- Bertram (Bertran) (1086–1096)
- Fulk II of Cardona (Folc II de Cardona) (1096–1099)
- Berenguer Bernat (1100–1106)
- Ramon Guillem (1107–1114)
- St. Olegarius (Sant Oleguer) (1114–1137)
- Arnau Ermengol (1137–1143)
- Guillem de Torroja (1144–1171)
- Bernat de Berga (1172–1188)
- Ramon de Castellvell (1189–1199)
- Berenguer de Palou I (1200–1206)
- Pere de Cirac (1208–1211)

In the twelfth century the diocese was restored by Ramon Berenguer, Count of Barcelona.

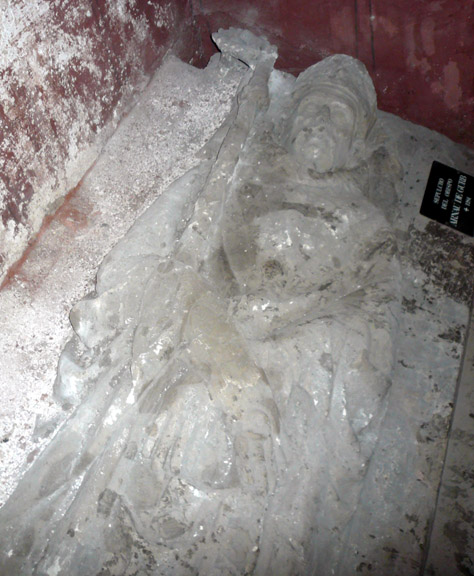
Arnau de Gurb was bishop during the mid- to late thirteenth century.

- Berenguer de Palou II (1212–1241)
- Pere de Centelles (1241–1252)
- Arnau de Gurb (Arnoldo de Guerbo) (1252–1284)
- Guerau de Gualba (1284–1285)
- Bernat Pelegrí (1288–1300)
- Pontius de Gualba (Ponç de Gualba) (1303–1334)
- Ferrer d'Abella (1335–1344)
- Bernat Oliver (1345–1346)
- Miguel de Ricomà (1346–1361)
- Guillem de Torrelles (1361–1369)
- Berenguer d’Erill (1369–1371)
- Pere de Planelles
- Ramon d’Escales (1386–1398)
- Joan Armengol (1389–1408)
- Francesc de Blanes (1409–1410)
- Francesc Climent (Sapera)
- Andreu Bertran (1416–1420; 1431–1433)
- Simó Salvador (1433–1445)
- Jaume Girard (1445–1456)
- Joan Soler (1456–1463)
- Fra Joan Ximenis Cerdá (1465–1472)
- Rodrigo Borgia (Roderic de Borja) (1472–1478)
- Gonzalo Fernández de Heredia (1478–1490)
- Pere Garcia (1490–1505)

Suffragan Bishops of Barcelona since 1505

- Enrique de Cardona y Enríquez (18 Apr 1505 – 23 Jan 1512 Appointed, Archbishop of Monreale)
- Martín García (27 Aug 1511 – 7 March 1521 Died)
  - Auxiliary Bishop: Juan Salazar, OFMConv (1520.05.14 – ?)
- Guillén-Ramón de Vich y de Valterra (20 Mar 1521 – 27 July 1525 Died)
- Silvio Passerini (28 June 1525 – 20 April 1529 Died)
- Luis Cardona (archbishop) (27 Aug 1529 – 23 Jan 1531), bnext Archbishop of Tarragona)
- Juan Cardona (bishop) (15 Feb 1531 – 1 Feb 1546 Died)
  - Auxiliary Bishop: Juan Jubí, OFM (1542.06.21 – 1573)
- Jaime Casador (17 May 1546 – 4 June 1561 Died)
  - Auxiliary Bishop: Antonio Codina, OESA (1548.05.07 – 1557)
- Guillermo Casador (4 June 1561 – 13 Nov 1570 Died)
- Martín Martínez de Villar (3 Mar 1573 – 14 Dec 1575 Died)
- Juan Dimas Loris (4 July 1576 – 8 Aug 1598 Died)
- Alfonso Coloma (27 Sep 1599 – 13 Jan 1603 Appointed, Bishop of Cartagena (en España))
- Rafael Rovirola (18 Feb 1604 – 12 Oct 1609 Died)
- Juan de Moncada (22 March 1610 – 30 July 1612), next Archbishop of Tarragona)
- Luis Sans y Códol (20 Aug 1612 – 23 Feb 1620 Died)
- Juan Sentís (20 July 1620 – 7 Oct 1632 Died)
- García Gil Manrique (28 Nov 1633 – 1655 Died)
- Ramón Sentmenat y Lanuza (25 Oct 1655 – 11 Feb 1663 Died)
- Alfonso de Sotomayor, OdeM (9 June 1664 – 10 Jun 1682 Died)
- Benito Ignacio Salazar Goiri, OSB (11 Jan 1683 – 23 Sep 1692 Died)
- Manuel de Alba (24 Aug 1693 – 22 April 1697 Died)
- Benito de Sala y de Caramany, OSB (24 Nov 1698 – 2 Jul 1715 Died)
- Diego de Astorga y Céspedes (30 March 1716 – 22 July 1720 Appointed, Archbishop of Toledo)
- Andrés de Orbe y Larreátegui (16 Dec 1720 – 18 April 1725 Appointed, Archbishop of Valencia)
- Bernardo Jiménez Cascante (11 Jun 1725 – 13 Dec 1730 Died)
- Gaspar de Molina y Oviedo, OSA (18 June 1731 – 5 May 1734 Appointed, Bishop of Malaga)
- Felipe Aguado y Requejo (30 Aug 1734 – 3 Nov 1737 Died)
- Francisco Castillo Vintimilla (22 July 1738 – 31 July 1747 Appointed, Bishop of Jaén)
- Francisco Díaz Santos y Bullón (1 April 1748 – 25 May 1750 Appointed, Bishop of Sigüenza)
- Manuel López Aguirre (22 Jul 1750 – 7 Feb 1754 Died)
- Asensio Sales (16 Dec 1754 – 17 Jan 1766 Died)
- José Climent Avinent (21 July 1766 – 16 Aug 1775 Resigned)
- Gavino Valladares y Mejía, OCarm (11 Sep 1775 – 13 Feb 1794 Died)
- Eustaquio Azara, OSB (12 Sep 1794 – 24 June 1797 Died)
- Pedro Díaz Valdés (14 Sep 1798 – 15 Nov 1807 Died)
- Pablo Sitjar Ruata (16 Mar 1808 Confirmed – 21 Aug 1831 Died)
- Pedro Martínez de San Martín (15 April 1833 Confirmed – 24 Mar 1849 Died)
- José Domingo Costa y Borrás (7 Jan 1850 Confirmed – 3 Aug 1857 Confirmed, Archbishop of Tarragona)
- Antonio Palau y Termes (25 Sep 1857 Confirmed – 8 July 1862 Died)
- Pantaleón Monserrat y Navarro (1 Oct 1863 – 21 July 1870 Died)
- Joaquín Lluch y Garriga, OCD (16 Jan 1874 – 22 June 1877 Confirmed, Archbishop of Sevilla)
- José María de Urquinaona y Vidot (15 July 1878 – 31 March 1883 Died)
- Jaime Catalá y Albosa (9 Aug 1883 – 1 March 1899 Died)
- José Morgades y Gili (19 June 1899 – 8 Jan 1901 Died)
- Salvador Casañas y Pagés (18 April 1901 – 27 Oct 1908 Died)
- Juan José Laguarda y Fenollera (29 April 1909 Confirmed – 4 Dec 1913 Died)
- Enrique Reig y Casanova (28 May 1914 – 22 April 1920 Appointed, Archbishop of Valencia)
- Ramón Guillamet y Coma (22 April 1920 – 14 April 1926 Died)
- José Miralles y Sbert (14 April 1926 – 13 March 1930 Appointed, Bishop of Mallorca)
- Manuel Irurita y Almándoz (13 March 1930 – 3 Dec 1936 Died)

=== Archbishopric ===
Non-Metropolitan Archbishops of Barcelona

- Gregorio Modrego y Casaus (30 Dec 1942 – 7 Jan 1967 Retired); Bishop in 1942, Archbishop (personal title) in 1952, Archbishop in 1964
- Marcelo González Martín (7 Jan 1967 – 3 Dec 1971 Appointed, Archbishop of Toledo)
- Narcís Jubany Arnau (3 Dec 1971 – 23 Mar 1992 Retired)
- Ricardo María Carles Gordó (23 Mar 1992 – 15 Jun 2004 Retired)

Metropolitan Archbishops of Barcelona

- Lluís Martínez Sistach (15 Jun 2004 – 6 Nov 2015 Retired)
- Juan José Omella (6 Nov 2015 – 11 Nov 2026 Retired), created Cardinal-Priest of S. Croce in Gerusalemme (2017.06.28 – ...)
- Octavi Vilà Mayo, O. Cist. (11 Nov 2026 – present)

=== Coadjutor and Auxiliary bishops ===
==== Coadjutors ====
- Coadjutor Archbishop: Marcelo González Martín (later Cardinal) (1966.02.21 – 1967.01.07)
- Coadjutor Bishop: José Miralles y Sbert (later Archbishop) (1925.07.03 – 1926.04.14)
- Coadjutor Bishop: Guillermo Casador (1560.06.29 – 1561.06.04)
- Coadjutor Bishop: Guillén-Ramón de Vich y de Vallterra (1519.01.24 – 1521.03.07)

==== Auxiliary bishops ====
- David Abadías Aurín (2023.02.14 – present)
- Javier Vilanova Pellisa (2020.10.06 – present)
- Antoni Vadell Ferrer (2017.06.19 – 2022.02.12 Deceased), Titular Bishop of Urci
- Sergi Gordo Rodríguez (2017.06.19 – 2023.07.13), Titular Bishop of Cenæ
- Sebastián Taltavull Anglada (2009.01.28 – 2017.09.19), Titular Bishop of Gabi
- José Ángel Saiz Meneses (2001.10.30 – 2004.06.15)
- Pere Tena Garriga (1993.06.09 – 2004.06.15)
- Jaume Traserra Cunillera (1993.06.09 – 2001.07.28)
- Joan Enric Vives i Sicília (later Archbishop) (1993.06.09 – 2001.06.25)
- Joan Carrera Planas (1991.07.16 – 2008.10.03)
- Carles Soler Perdigó (1991.07.16 – 2001.10.30)
- Lluís Martínez Sistach (later Cardinal) (1987.11.06 – 1991.05.17)
- José Capmany Casamitjana (1968.10.22 – 1991.09.11)
- Ramón Daumal Serra (1968.10.22 – 1987.10.30)
- José María Guix Ferreres (1968.10.22 – 1983.06.20)
- Ramón Torrella Cascante (later Archbishop) (1968.10.22 – 1970.11.06)
- Narciso Jubany Arnau (later Cardinal) (1955.11.24 – 1964.02.07)
- Ricardo Cortés y Cullel (1903.06.25 – 1910.03.20)
- Pablo Sitjar Ruata (1797.07.24 – 1808.03.16)

== See also ==
- List of Catholic dioceses in Spain, Andorra, Ceuta and Gibraltar
- History of Barcelona

== Sources and external links ==
- GCatholic
- Bishops of the Cathedral (in Catalan)

=== Bibliography ===
- Eubel, Conradus, ed. (1913). Hierarchia catholica, Tomus 1 (second ed.). Münster: Libreria Regensbergiana. p. 128. (in Latin)
- Eubel, Conradus, ed. (1914). Hierarchia catholica, Tomus 2 (second ed.). Münster: Libreria Regensbergiana.
- Eubel, Conradus, ed. (1923). Hierarchia catholica, Tomus 3 (second ed.). Münster: Libreria Regensbergiana.
- Gauchat, Patritius (Patrice) (1935). Hierarchia catholica IV (1592-1667). Münster: Libraria Regensbergiana.
- Gyug, Richard (1994). The Diocese of Barcelona During the Black Death: The Register Notule Communium 15 (1348-1349). Toronto Canada: Pontifical Institute of Mediaeval Studies. ISBN 978-0-88844-371-7.
