= Gambling on papal conclaves =

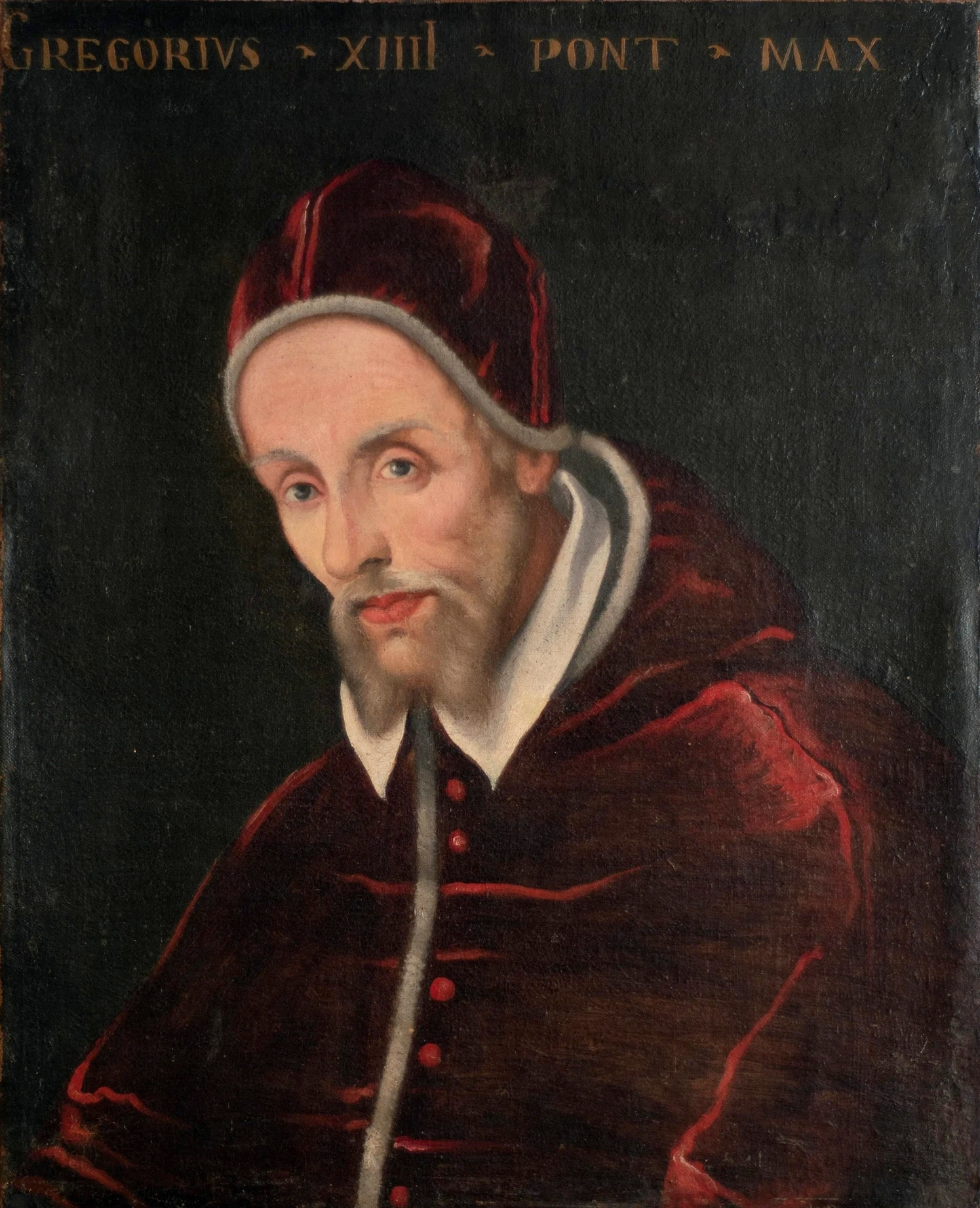
Pope Gregory XIV made gambling on papal elections punishable by excommunication

Gambling on papal elections has a long history, with betting on 16th-century papal conclaves being among the first documented examples of gambling on election outcomes. It can be inferred that the practice started in the 15th century at the latest. During the same period, gambling was also common on the outcomes of secular Italian elections, such as that of the doge of Venice. Since 1591, it had been an excommunicable offense but was abrogated in 1918.

== 15th century ==
The Republic of Venice forbade betting on the pope's life in 1419, and canceled bets already made. Life insurance policies were often taken out on the current pope, sometimes as genuine insurance by businessmen owed money by the papacy who feared a change of Pontiff, but also a purely speculative venture. Such policies on the lives of popes and other notable figures were forbidden in Barcelona (1435) and Genoa (1467 and 1494).

== 16th century ==
The first recorded example of gambling on the candidate to be selected by a papal election occurs with the September 1503 papal conclave, although Frederic Baumgartner, a historian of papal elections, considers it then already "an old practice".

Discussing the election of Leo X in 1513, it has been stated:

Betting on the outcome of papal elections was quite common and was often handled by the banking houses in Rome which employed sensali, or messengers, to scurry back and forth delivering betting slips. Bettors watched the odds closely.

Before and during the 1549–1550 papal conclave, many Roman bankers offered betting spreads on the papabili (cardinals likely to be elected). According to the Venetian Enrico Dandolo, a witness to the conclave, "it is more than clear that the merchants are very well informed about the state of the poll, and that the cardinals' attendants in Conclave go partners with them in wagers, which thus causes many tens of thousands of crowns to change hands". Dandolo describes an early example of insider trading. Cardinal del Monte (who was eventually elected Julius III) had eventually started out as the favorite at 5–1, trailed by Salviati, Ridolfi, and Pole, but Pole was the favorite three days later at 4–1. By December 5, Pole's odds had shortened to 100–95. With the arrival of four additional French cardinals on December 11, Pole's odds drifted to 5–2. On January 22, the odds quoted against the conclave finishing during January were 10–9, against February: 2–1, against March: 5–1, and never: 10–1.

In March 1591, Pope Gregory XIV through his bull Cogit nos imposed a penalty of excommunication against any who wagered on the outcome or length of papal elections (as well as the creation of cardinals), and banned the practice in the Papal States. The canon was abrogated (along with the rest of existing canon law) in 1918 by the reforms of Pope Benedict XV.

== 19th century ==
According to a New York Times article following the 1878 papal conclave: "The Italians are all superstitious, and all fond of the lottery. Every great event leads to speculation in numbers. The deaths and advents of the Popes has always given rise to an excessive amount of gambling in the lottery, and today the people of Italy are in a state of excitement that is indescribable. Figures are picked out which have some relation with the life or death of Pius IX. Every day large sums are paid for tickets in the lottery about to be drawn."

== 20th century ==
Gambling over the outcomes of the 1903 papal conclave and 1922 papal conclave was covered in several newspapers.

Pope Gregory XIV's bull of excommunication as a penalty for such wagers was never specifically rescinded, but was abrogated (along with all provisions of canon law associated with the ius decretalium) by the 1917 Code of Canon Law.

There was such extensive betting in Britain over the elections of Pope John Paul I and Pope John Paul II that the English Catholic primate, Basil Hume, the Archbishop of Westminster, forbade Catholic participation.

== 21st century ==
Paddy Power, Ireland's largest bookmaker, started taking bets on the successor of Pope John Paul II five years before the pontiff's death. British bookmakers such as Pinnacle Sports and William Hill plc also offered such bets, with significantly different odds. As per Reuters, such bets "fall into the novelty category of one-off events that cannot be judged by conventional statistics or sporting form". In this wise the fantasy league method has been employed.

=== 2005 papal conclave ===
Cardinal Ratzinger, the eventual choice of the 2005 papal conclave as Pope Benedict XVI, started out with 12–1 odds, but was a 3–1 favorite at the time of the conclave. David Power, the proprietor of Paddy Power, was evicted from St. Peter's Square by security staff before the start of the 2005 conclave for displaying his betting prices, by what he claims were undercover police officers. Paddy Power alone took over $382,000 in bets on the conclave, making it — according to Power — "the biggest non-sports betting market of all time."

Most conventional sport books, such as those in Las Vegas, did not accept bets on election outcomes. A handicapper for Bally's and Paris Las Vegas said the casinos refused to accept bets on the 2005 election because of "taste" concerns.

=== 2013 papal conclave ===
In the United States, gambling on papal conclaves is generally confined to online gambling, which was historically illegal in the United States under the Federal Wire Act of 1961, which prohibits the use of interstate commerce (including mail and Internet) for gambling purposes. In September 2011, the United States Justice Department announced its opinion that the Federal Wire Act did not ban all forms of online gambling but only betting on a "sporting event or contest", Intrastate betting on the papal conclave may now be legal, however, interstate policy was yet to be determined as of 2013.

Leighton Vaughan Williams and David Paton have investigated betting on the 2013 papal election, within the context of the history of betting on papal conclaves.

=== 2025 papal conclave ===
Axios noted that betting markets have historically been bad predictors of papal conclaves, with Jorge Bergoglio, later known as Pope Francis, having been in 15th place in 2013. Given the lack of polling and insider knowledge, it is mostly a matter of perception.

By the morning after the death of Pope Francis, Polymarket, a cryptocurrency-based online prediction market, had already accepted $3 million USD in wagers on who would be the next pope. The top five contenders as of 21 April were Pietro Parolin, Luis Antonio Tagle, Pierbattista Pizzaballa, Péter Erdő, and Peter Turkson. (Users of the site could also gamble as to when the pope would be chosen, which continent he would be from, and whether or not he would be black).

The infotainment fantasy league Fantapapa, established in Italy immediately after Pope Francis's death, quickly gained 60,000 punters for whom the sole listed potential payout was "eternal glory". In the UK, a spokesperson for William Hill noted that it was their busiest non-sports market, and that one of the biggest illegal sites has had $10 million wagered so far. In the wider industry, roughly £30,000 had already been wagered by the weekend prior to the conclave.

By 5 May, two days before the conclave, the top five contenders as per Sportsbook Review were Pietro Parolin, Luis Antonio Tagle, Matteo Zuppi, Peter Turkson, and Pierbattista Pizzaballa. The site noted that these were "key figures repeatedly mentioned by Vatican journalists and analysts".

On the day of the election of Robert Francis Prevost, who took the name Pope Leo XIV, the leading candidates on Polymarket were Pietro Parolin at 37%, Luis Antonio Tagle at 26%, Pierbattista Pizzaballa at 10%, Peter Erdo at 8%, Peter Turkson at 7%, Robert Sarah at 4%, and Matteo Zuppi at 3%. Parolin's odds to be named as the new pope jumped to nearly 70% after the white smoke was revealed, with many suspecting that the relatively short conclave indicated a consensus candidate had been chosen. When Prevost was revealed to be the next pope, many were surprised, as his odds in most betting markets hovered in the range of 1% to 2% or even less.
