= Antonio Pallavicini Gentili =

Italian Cardinal

His Eminence Antonio Pallavicini Gentili
- Cardinal-Bishop of Palestrina
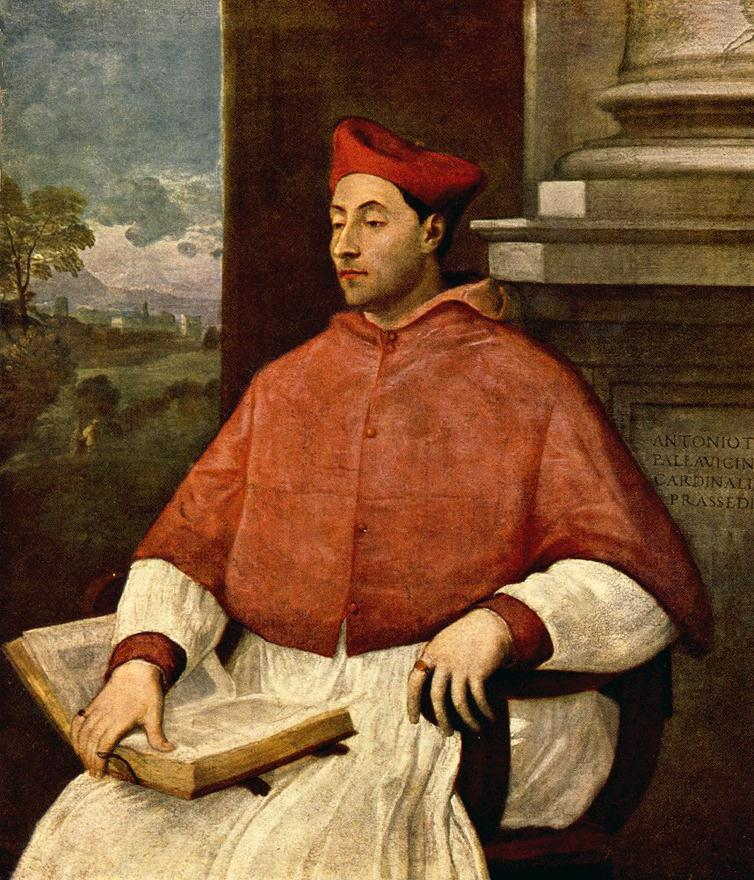
- Church: Roman Catholic
- In office: 1503–1507

Orders
- Created cardinal: 9 March 1489 by Pope Innocent VIII
- Rank: Cardinal-Bishop

Personal details
- Born: c. 1441 Genoa, Republic of Genoa
- Died: 10 September 1507 (aged c. 66)
- Buried: Santa Maria del Popolo, Rome
- Coat of arms

Antonio Gentile Pallavicini (c. 1441 – 10 September 1507) was an Italian Cardinal. He was considered papabile in 1492. Bishop of Frascati from April until December 1503; later bishop of Palestrina.

== Life ==
Although Pallavicini grew up in Genoa, documents from the time, including a papal bull from 1472, refer to his Castilian connection. Historians speculate that his father, a merchant, may have used a Castilian ship to travel, claiming the protection of the King of Castile. When Pallavicini was young, he and his brothers also conducted business in Spain. Much later, in the conclave of 1503, he had Spanish support to become Pope.

He moved to Rome with Cardinal Cibo (future Pope Innocent VIII), also from Genoa) and Pope Sixtus IV hired him to draft Apostolic letters and then made him bishop of Ventimiglia in 1484. After Pope Sixtus IV's death in 1484, the new Pope Innocent VIII made Pallavicini bishop of Ourense in Spain in 1486. From 1484 (the first year of Pope Innocent VIII's papacy) to 1489 he was Papal Datary in the Roman Curia, and therefore did not reside in Ventimiglia. In 1489, Pope Innocent VIII appointed him cardinal.

His first conclave occurred three years later, in 1492, after Pope Innocent VIII's death. Although Pallavicini was considered papabile, his chances of being elected pope were low because it was traditional not to elect two popes from the same location in a row and Innocent VIII was also from Genoa. Cardinal Borgia (who would be elected Pope Alexander VI) bribed Pallavicini with the Bishopric of Pamplona in exchange for his vote. (Pallavicini took over this position from Cesare Borgia, against the will of the monarchs of Navarre, and finding instead the veiled support of Ferdinand II of Aragon.)

During the Italian Wars, Pope Alexander VI and then Pope Julius II entrusted him with a series of diplomatic responsibilities. While the pope himself was in the fortress, Castel Sant'Angelo he sent Pallavicini to negotiate with Charles VIII of France who had entered Rome. In 1507, Pallavicini served as Papal legate to Pope Julius II to negotiate with the King of France and Ferdinand II of Aragon to unite against Venice in the War of the League of Cambrai.

Pallavicini was confident he would be elected pope in the September 1503 conclave that elected Pope Pius III. He had the support of the Spanish cardinals and during the conclave, he worked to persuade the French and Italian factions to back him. Pallavicini was sure enough in his chances that he requested Johann Burchard move him to a room that would not be next to Cardinal Piccolomini (who would be elected pope). In the first scrutiny, however, he received only three first-choice votes. This was the fifth most of any of the seventeen candidates, but significantly less than Oliviero Carafa and Giuliano Della Rovere, the two front-runners. He did not manage to make up this loss in the next scrutinies and Pope Pius III was soon elected Pope.

Pallavicini directed the early education of his nephew, Cardinal Giovanni Battista Pallavicino (1480–1524), hand-picking his private tutors. Around 1506 when his nephew was 26, Pallavicini gave him authority over the S. Anthony of Pré monestary and appointed him Dean of the Chapter of the Ourense Cathedral.

There is a well-known portrait by Titian. He was buried in the Old St. Peter's Basilica but his tomb was transferred to the Montemirabile Chapel in Santa Maria del Popolo in 1596.

== Public image and reputation ==
Pallavicini was known as il incantatore, The Enchanter, because of his persuasiveness. Gaetano Moroni elaborates on this character trait, writing, "Antoniotto had been endowed by nature with a singular dexterity in handling the hearts of others, and he thoroughly mastered the art of insinuating himself into people's souls; thus, through the sweetness of his demeanor and the gentleness of his manners, he won the heart of everyone with whom he interacted."

The historian Oberto Foglietta, wrote the following elegy for Pallavicini:

Antoniotto’s gravity, prudence, wisdom, and integrity shone with such brilliance that, when the pontifical throne fell vacant, he was designated—by a plurality of votes during the cardinals’ preparatory meetings—to occupy the Chair of Saint Peter; indeed, he came very close to attaining the Sovereign Pontificate, borne to that exalted station by the votes of many Pontiffs and by his own merits.

== See also ==
- Pallavicini family
- Francesco Sforza Pallavicino, cardinal of the 17th century
