= Franciotto Orsini =

Italian cardinal

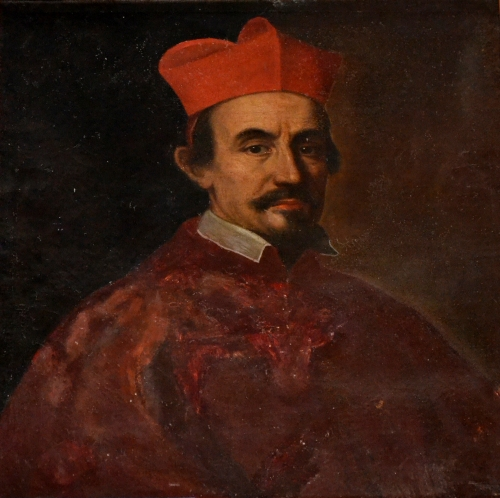
Ritratto di Franciotto Orsini

Franciotto Orsini (1473–1534) was an Italian Roman Catholic cardinal.

== Biography ==
A member of the Orsini family, Franciotto Orsini was born in Rome in 1473, the son of Orso Orsini di Monterotondo and Costanza Savelli. He was a cousin of Pope Leo X on his father's side. Orsini was educated in Florence by Lorenzo de' Medici.

Early in his life, he participated in several military exercises, fighting against the forces of Cesare Borgia.

Moving to Rome, he became a protonotary apostolic. His uncle Pope Leo X made him a cardinal deacon in the consistory of 1 July 1517. He received the red hat and the deaconry of San Giorgio in Velabro on 6 July 1517.

He was administrator of the see of Nicastro from 15 September 1517 to 5 May 1518. He became archpriest of St. Peter's Basilica in 1520, in succession to Cardinal Ippolito d'Este, who had died on 3 September 1520; Orsini held the post until 1530, when he was succeeded by Cardinal Francesco Corsaro. On 18 January 1519 he was named administrator of the see of Boiano, holding this post until 24 July 1523. He was deposed from the cardinalate on 8 August 1519, though later reinstated. Sometime after 1519, he opted for the deaconry of Santa Maria in Cosmedin.

He participated in both the papal conclave of 1521-22 that elected Pope Adrian VI, and in the papal conclave of 1523 that elected Pope Clement VII.

On 15 June 1524 he became administrator of the see of Fréjus, holding this post until 15 December 1525. He was the administrator of the see of Rimini from 23 March 1528 until 7 April 1529.

== Family ==
He was married to Violante Orsini di Mugnano and had five legitimate children. After his wife's death, he entered the ecclesiastical estate.

== Death ==
He died in Rome on 10 January 1534. He is buried in St. Peter's Basilica.

== Bibliography ==
- Bazzano, Nicoletta (2013). "ORSINI, Franciotto.". (in Italian), in: Dizionario Biografico degli Italiani Volume 79 (2013).
