= Francesco Armellini Pantalassi de' Medici =

Italian cardinal

His Eminence Francesco Armellini Pantalassi de' Medici
- Cardinal Bishop of Taranto
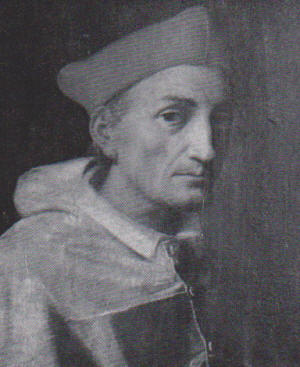
- Church: Roman Catholic
- Diocese: Archdiocese of Taranto
- Appointed: 1525
- In office: 1525-1527
- Predecessor: Giovanni Maria Poderico
- Successor: Girolamo d'Ippolito
- Other posts: Cardinal-Priest of San Callisto; Cardinal-Priest of Santa Maria in Trastevere
- Previous post: Administrator of Gerace (1517-1519)

Orders
- Created cardinal: 1 July 1517 by Pope Leo X
- Rank: Cardinal-Priest

Personal details
- Born: 13 July 1470 Perugia, Papal States
- Died: 8 January 1527 (age 57)

Francesco Armellini Pantalassi de' Medici (13 July 1470 – 8 January 1528) was a cardinal of the Roman Catholic Church. He was a member of the Roman Curia.

== Life ==
Medici was born in Perugia, Umbria. He was made a cardinal on the 6 July 1517 by Pope Leo X, to the titular church of San Callisto. This was his fifth consistory. He was bishop of Gerace e Oppido in 1517, and archbishop of Taranto in 1525. He was bishop of Gallipoli.

In the rione Borgo the cardinal let built a magnificent palace bearing his name.

The historian Paolo Giovio wrote that the exactions and greed that the Cardinal showed in running the papal finances, as Camerlengo of the Holy Roman Church from 1521, had played a large part in causing the 1527 sack of Rome, because he had alienated the Roman population.

Catholic Church titles
Preceded by Bandinello Sauli	Bishop of Gerace; 1517-1519	Succeeded by Alessandro Cesarini
Preceded by Giovanni Maria Poderico	Archbishop of Taranto; 1513-1517	Succeeded by Girolamo d'Ippolito
