= Deaths in October 2008 =

The following is a list of notable deaths in October 2008.

Entries for each day are listed alphabetically by surname. A typical entry lists information in the following sequence:

- Name, age, country of citizenship at birth, subsequent country of citizenship (if applicable), reason for notability, cause of death (if known), and reference.

== October 2008 ==
=== 1 ===
- Ian Collier, 65, British singer and actor (Doctor Who).
- Robert Couturier, 103, French sculptor.
- J. Don Ferguson, 74, American actor (Norma Rae, Maximum Overdrive, Major League: Back to the Minors), leukemia.
- Bill Flagg, 79, British Anglican prelate, Bishop of Peru (1973–1977).
- Daphney Hlomuka, 59, South African actress, kidney cancer.
- Val Jansante, 88, American football player (Pittsburgh Steelers).
- Detlef Lewe, 69, German canoeist, 1972 Olympic bronze medalist, after brief illness.
- House Peters Jr., 92, American actor (Mr. Clean), pneumonia.
- Nick Reynolds, 75, American folk musician (The Kingston Trio), acute respiratory disease.
- Arlene Sherman, 61, American television producer (Sesame Street).
- LeJuan Simon, 27, Trinidadian athlete, complications of pulmonary hypertension.
- Poornam Viswanathan, 88, Indian actor, multiple organ failure.
- Boris Yefimov, 108, Russian political cartoonist.

=== 2 ===
- George Anselevicius, 85, Lithuanian-born American architect.
- Bonnie Bluh, 82, American feminist writer, aortic dissection.
- Choi Jin-sil, 39, South Korean actress, suicide by hanging.
- Rob Guest, 58, British-born New Zealand actor and singer, stroke.
- Anna Hagemann, 89, German Olympic athlete.
- Shaharom Husain, 88, Malaysian historian.
- Kataejar Jibas, 55, Marshallese politician, mayor of Bikini Atoll since 2007, injuries from a car accident.
- John Sjoberg, 67, British footballer (Leicester City F.C.).

=== 3 ===
- Zulfiqar Ahmed, 82, Pakistani cricketer, cardiac arrest.
- Mahir al-Zubaydi, Iraqi al-Qaeda leader, shot.
- Geoffrey Davis, 74, Australian doctor.
- Jean Foyer, 87, French politician, Minister of Justice (1962–1967) and Minister of Health (1972–1973).
- Frederick Charles Hurrell, 80, British Royal Air Force officer.
- Hugo Ironside, 90, British soldier.
- Johnny "J", 39, American hip-hop producer, apparent suicide by jumping.
- Rajendra Singh Lodha, 66, Indian accountant, chairman of the Birla Corporation, heart attack.
- George Thomson, Baron Thomson of Monifieth, 87, British businessman and journalist, MP (1952–1973), viral infection.

=== 4 ===
- Harry Bath, 83, Australian national rugby league player and coach, after long illness.
- Ted Briggs, 85, British sailor, last survivor of the sinking of HMS Hood.
- Fred Degazon, 95, 1st president of Dominica.
- Craig Fertig, 66, American football player and coach, kidney failure.
- Al Gallodoro, 95, American jazz musician, after brief illness.
- Derek Jones, 81, British colonial official, Hong Kong Secretary for Economic Services (1973–1976), Environment (1976–1981).
- Saul Laskin, 90, Canadian politician, first mayor of Thunder Bay, heart attack.
- Peter Vansittart, 88, British writer.

=== 5 ===
- Ernest Beutler, 80, American hematologist, lymphoma.
- Beth A. Brown, 39, American NASA astrophysicist, pulmonary embolism.
- Kim Chan, 90, Chinese-born American actor (Kung Fu: The Legend Continues, The Fifth Element, Lethal Weapon 4).
- Leopoldo Elia, 82, Italian legal scholar, President of the Constitutional Court, Minister of Foreign Affairs (1994).
- Servando González, 85, Mexican documentary film director.
- Mohamed Moumou, 43, Iraqi al-Qaeda second-in-command, shot.
- Howard G. Munson, 84, American judge.
- Iba N'Diaye, 80, Senegalese painter, heart failure.
- Ken Ogata, 71, Japanese actor (The Ballad of Narayama), liver cancer.
- Hans Richter, 89, German actor and director (Emil and the Detectives).
- Lloyd Thaxton, 81, American television personality, multiple myeloma.

=== 6 ===
- Murad Abro, 42, Pakistani politician, road accident.
- Peter Avery, 85, British scholar and Iranian specialist.
- Larry Belcher, 61, American politician, member of Kentucky House of Representatives (1999–2002, since 2006), car accident.
- Paul Clark, 68, British judge.
- Peter Cox, 82, Australian politician.
- Paavo Haavikko, 77, Finnish poet and playwright, after long illness.
- Olga Kaljakin, 57, American art director and film poster artist (The Last Samurai, Field of Dreams, Moonstruck), emphysema.
- Kim Ji-hoo, 23, South Korean actor and model, suicide by hanging.
- Nadia Nerina, 80, South African ballerina.
- Janaka Perera, 62, Sri Lankan general and politician, bomb blast injuries.
- Anne Margrethe Strømsheim, 94, Norwegian resistance member.
- Sir John Young, 88, Australian jurist, Chief Justice of Victoria (1974–1991), Lieutenant-Governor of Victoria (1974–1995).

=== 7 ===
- Peter Copley, 93, British actor.
- Cozzene, 28, American Thoroughbred racehorse, euthanized.
- Bruce Dal Canton, 66, American baseball player, esophageal cancer.
- Leslie Hardman, 95, British Army Jewish chaplain at liberation of Bergen-Belsen.
- George Kissell, 88, American baseball coach (St. Louis Cardinals), car accident.
- Ivar Mathisen, 88, Norwegian Olympic silver medal-winning (1948) sprint canoer.
- DeWayne McKinney, 47, American ATM entrepreneur wrongfully convicted of murder, traffic accident.
- George Emil Palade, 95, Romanian cell biologist, Nobel Prize laureate (Physiology or Medicine, 1974).
- Princess Rooney, 28, American Thoroughbred racehorse, euthanized.
- Miles Richmond, 85, British painter.

=== 8 ===
- David Akutagawa, 71, Japanese Canadian martial artist, heart attack.
- Chicão, 59, Brazilian footballer.
- Jim Drake, 77, British rugby league player.
- Bob Friend, 70, British newscaster, cancer.
- Gidget Gein, 39, American bassist (Marilyn Manson), drug overdose.
- Pete Goegan, 74, Canadian ice hockey player (Detroit Red Wings, Minnesota North Stars, New York Rangers).
- Tanya Halesworth, 73, Australian television news presenter, cancer.
- Eileen Herlie, 90, British-born American actress (Hamlet, All My Children), complications of pneumonia.
- Norman Hogg, Baron Hogg of Cumbernauld, 70, British politician, MP (1979–1997), cancer.
- Cliff Malone, 83, Canadian ice hockey player (Montreal Canadiens), heart failure.
- Les McCrabb, 93, American baseball player (Philadelphia Athletics).

=== 9 ===
- Karl Albert, 87, German philosopher and professor.
- Albert Hall, 74, American hammer throw champion, complications from Alzheimer's disease.
- Milan Kymlicka, 72, Czech-born Canadian composer and conductor.
- David Lett, 69, American winemaker, heart failure.
- Bert Loxley, 74, British footballer and manager, after long illness.
- Ardeshir Mohasses, 70, Iranian illustrator and cartoonist, heart attack.
- Judith Wachs, 70, American musician (Voice of the Turtle) and promoter of Sephardic music, cancer.

=== 10 ===
- James Benson, 63, American entrepreneur (SpaceDev), brain tumor.
- Alton Ellis, 70, Jamaican singer, lymphatic cancer.
- Sid Hudson, 93, American baseball player.
- Aslam Khattak, 100, Pakistani politician and diplomat, after long illness.
- Gerald Leeman, 86, American wrestler, Olympic silver medallist (1948).
- Kazuyoshi Miura, 61, Japanese businessman, murder suspect, suicide by hanging.
- Javad Nurbakhsh, 81, Iranian spiritual leader.
- Jiřina Petrovická, 85, Czech actress.
- Alexey Prokurorov, 44, Russian cross-country skier, car accident.
- Leo Rosner, 90, Polish-born Australian musician, Holocaust survivor in Schindler's List, complications of Alzheimer's disease.
- Summing, 30, American thoroughbred racehorse and sire, natural causes.
- Kurt Weinzierl, 77, Austrian actor.

=== 11 ===
- Vija Artmane, 79, Latvian actress, complications from strokes.
- Daniel Awdry, 84, British politician, MP for Chippenham (1962–1979).
- William Claxton, 80, American photographer, complications of heart failure.
- Kevin Foster, 39, American baseball player, renal cancer.
- Jörg Haider, 58, Austrian politician, Governor of Carinthia (1989–1991, since 1999), leader of the FPÖ and BZÖ, car accident.
- Russ Hamilton, 76, British singer.
- Ernst-Paul Hasselbach, 42, Surinamese-born Dutch television producer, car accident.
- Neal Hefti, 85, American composer ("Batman Theme", "The Odd Couple Theme"), heart attack.
- William J. Higginson, 69, American poet and translator.
- Randy Johnston, 20, American male model, accidental drug overdose.
- Hayley Marie Kohle, 26, Canadian fashion model, suicide by jumping.
- Badar Munir, 68, Pakistani actor, complications of cardiac arrest.
- Scarlett, 13, American stray cat, name source of the Scarlett Award for Animal Heroism, animal euthanasia.
- Mark Shivas, 70, British film and television producer, Head of BBC Drama (1988–1993).
- Allan Spear, 71, American politician, first openly gay member of Minnesota Senate (1973–2000), complications of heart surgery.
- Gil Stratton, 86, American television and radio sportscaster (Los Angeles Rams, Santa Anita Racetrack), heart failure.
- Nelson Symonds, 75, Canadian jazz guitarist, heart attack,

=== 12 ===
- Sukha Bose, 77, Indian cricket umpire.
- Lenvil Elliott, 57, American football player (San Francisco 49ers, Cincinnati Bengals), heart attack.
- Chuck Evans, 41, American football player (Minnesota Vikings), heart failure.
- Sir Dick Franks, 88, British Head of the Secret Intelligence Service (1979–1982).
- Roy K. Moore, 94, American FBI agent known for civil rights investigations, pneumonia.
- Cliff Nobles, 67, American pop musician, cancer.
- Rudolf Pangsepp, 87, Estonian book designer and artist.
- James E. Reilly, 60, American soap opera writer, complications from cardiac surgery.
- John R. Reilly, 80, American lawyer, adviser to six Democratic presidential candidates, cancer.
- Allan Rosenfield, 75, American physician, dean of Columbia University School of Public Health (1986–2008), amyotrophic lateral sclerosis.
- Emil Steinberger, 79, American physician, lung cancer.

=== 13 ===
- Khryss Adalia, 62, Filipino film, television and stage director, colorectal cancer.
- Pablo Barrachina Estevan, 95, Spanish bishop of Orihuela-Alicante (1954–1989).
- Alexei Cherepanov, 19, Russian ice hockey player, acute cardiomyopathy.
- Arthur J. Crowns, 86, American politician and academic lawyer.
- Guillaume Depardieu, 37, French actor, pneumonia.
- Antonio José González Zumárraga, 83, Ecuadorian cardinal, stomach cancer.
- Luciana Pignatelli, 73, Italian socialite, suicide by drug overdose.
- Matthew J. Rinaldo, 77, American politician, member of the House of Representatives (1973–1993), Parkinson's disease.
- Paul Rogers, 87, American politician, member of the House of Representatives (1957–1979), lung cancer.
- Frank Rosenthal, 79, American gaming executive, sports handicapper, inspiration for the 1995 film Casino, heart attack.
- Eduardus Sangsun, 65, Indonesian bishop of Ruteng, heart attack.
- Françoise Seigner, 80, French comedian and actress, pancreatic cancer.
- Eduardo Serrano, 97, Venezuelan musician, conductor and composer.
- Adam Watene, 31, Cook Islands rugby league player, heart attack.
- Christopher Wicking, 65, British screenwriter.

=== 14 ===
- Barrington J. Bayley, 71, British science fiction author, complications of colorectal cancer.
- Richard Cooey, 41, American convicted murderer, executed by lethal injection.
- Robert Furman, 93, American spy during World War II, foreign intelligence chief for Manhattan Project, metastatic melanoma.
- Antonio Iannucci, 94, Italian archbishop of Pescara-Penne (1959–1990).
- Ray Lowry, 64, British cartoonist and illustrator, after long illness.
- Anne Mackenzie-Stuart, 78, British political activist.
- Pat Moss, 73, British rally driver, cancer.
- Martin Peake, 2nd Viscount Ingleby, 82, British peer, activist for the disabled.
- Kazys Petkevičius, 82, Lithuanian basketball player and coach.
- Dame Daphne Purves, 99, New Zealand educator.
- Kevin Terris, 63, American racing driver.

=== 15 ===
- Edie Adams, 81, American actress (Li'l Abner, It's a Mad, Mad, Mad, Mad World, The Apartment), Tony winner (1957), pneumonia and cancer.
- Fazıl Hüsnü Dağlarca, 94, Turkish poet, chronic renal failure.
- Nathan Davis, 91, American actor (Thief, Holes, Risky Business).
- Chris Mims, 38, American football player.
- Jack Narz, 85, American game show host (Concentration), complications from strokes.
- Suzzanna, 66, Indonesian actress, complications of diabetes.
- Eddie Thompson, 68, British businessman, chairman of Dundee United, prostate cancer.
- Des Townson, 74, New Zealand yacht designer, cancer.
- Tom Tresh, 70, American baseball player (New York Yankees, Detroit Tigers), heart attack.
- Roderick Walker, 76, British SAS commander.
- Wang Yung-ching, 91, Taiwanese entrepreneur and billionaire, founder of Formosa Plastics.

=== 16 ===
- Germán Abad Valenzuela, 89, Ecuadorian radiologist.
- Ere Kokkonen, 70, Finnish film director, after illness.
- David Lee, 70, Canadian sound engineer (Chicago, X-Men, Crash), Oscar winner (2003).
- Paul L. Montgomery, 72, American journalist and reporter (The New York Times), cancer.
- Dagmar Normet, 87, Estonian writer and translator.
- Jack Reynolds, 71, American professional wrestling announcer (WWWF/WWF), complications from surgery.

=== 17 ===
- George M. Keller, 84, American oil executive, founder of Chevron Corporation, complications from orthopedic surgery.
- Prince Ludwig of Bavaria, 95, German prince, member of the House of Wittelsbach.
- Urmas Ott, 53, Estonian journalist and television host, heart attack.
- Santo Bartolomeo Quadri, 88, Italian archbishop of Modena-Nonantola (1983–1996).
- Bill Reilly, 70, American publisher, founder of Primedia, bone and prostate cancer.
- Levi Stubbs, 72, American vocalist (The Four Tops), complications of cancer and stroke.
- Nick Weatherspoon, 58, American basketball player, natural causes.
- Ben Weider, 85, Canadian bodybuilding promoter and Napoleon scholar.

=== 18 ===
- Raymond Delacy Adams, 97, American neurologist and neuropathologist, heart failure.
- Daniel Aguillón, 24, Mexican boxer, brain death caused by knockout.
- Evelyn Ay Sempier, 75, American beauty pageant winner, Miss America (1954), colorectal cancer.
- Salvatore Boccaccio, 70, Italian bishop of Frosinone-Veroli-Ferentino.
- Albert Boime, 75, American art historian, myelofibrosis.
- Alfredo E. Evangelista, 82, Filipino archaeologist, discovered the Laguna Copperplate Inscription.
- Charley Fox, 88, Canadian pilot credited with strafing Erwin Rommel's car, car accident.
- Peter Gordeno, 69, British actor, singer and dancer.
- Tormod Haugen, 63, Norwegian children's author, after long illness.
- E. K. Mawlong, 62, Indian politician, Chief Minister of Meghalaya (2000–2001).
- Dave McKenna, 78, American jazz pianist, lung cancer.
- Ralph Hanover, 28, Standardbred colt, euthanized.
- James J. Rhoades, 66, American politician, member of the Pennsylvania State Senate since 1981, car accident.
- Dee Dee Warwick, 66, American soul singer, sister of Dionne Warwick, after long illness.
- Xie Jin, 84, Chinese film director.

=== 19 ===
- Nazir Ahmed, 93, Indian scholar, writer, and teacher.
- Richard Blackwell, 86, American fashion critic ("Mr. Blackwell's Ten Worst Dressed Women"), intestinal infection.
- John A. Campbell, 67, Australian-born American lumber executive, president and CEO of Pacific Lumber Company, cancer.
- Tony Dean, 67, American outdoors broadcaster, complications from appendectomy.
- Marilyn Ferguson, 70, American writer (The Aquarian Conspiracy), heart attack.
- Hal Kant, 77, American lawyer for the Grateful Dead, pancreatic cancer.
- Lia Maivia, 81, Samoan wrestling promoter, wife of Peter Maivia, grandmother of Dwayne Johnson.
- Harry T. Mangurian Jr., 82, American businessman and horse breeder, former owner of the Boston Celtics, leukemia.
- Mireille Marokvia, 99, French writer.
- Rudy Ray Moore, 81, American comedian and actor (Dolemite), complications from diabetes.
- Robert B. Nett, 86, American Medal of Honor recipient, after brief illness.
- Nigel Plews, 74, British cricket umpire, renal cancer.
- Gianni Raimondi, 85, Italian lyric tenor.
- Gail Robinson, 62, American soprano, complications from rheumatoid arthritis.
- Arthur Sendas, 72, Brazilian supermarket magnate, shot.
- Lou Stringer, 91, American baseball player (Chicago Cubs and Boston Red Sox).
- Doreen Wilber, 78, American archer, 1972 Olympic gold medallist, Alzheimer's disease.

=== 20 ===
- Emmanuelle Cinquin, 99, French religious sister, natural causes.
- Shamsiah Fakeh, 84, Malaysian independence activist, lung infection.
- Vittorio Foa, 98, Italian politician, journalist and writer.
- James Gleeson, 92, Australian art critic and surrealist painter.
- William Headline, 76, American CNN bureau chief, fall.
- Gene Hickerson, 73, American football player (Cleveland Browns) and member of the Pro Football Hall of Fame, after long illness.
- Pat Kavanagh, 68, British literary agent, wife of Julian Barnes, brain tumour.
- Joe Lutz, 83, American baseball player (St. Louis Browns), after long illness.
- David Myers, 37, British rugby league player (Widnes and England), car accident.
- John Ringham, 80, British actor (Just Good Friends, Doctor Who, V for Vendetta).
- Bobi Sourander, 79, Finnish-born Swedish journalist and author.
- C. V. Sridhar, 73, Indian filmmaker, cardiac arrest.
- Krzysztof Zaleski, 60, Polish actor, after long illness.

=== 21 ===
- Muhammad Abdullah, 76, Bangladeshi academic.
- Sonja Bernadotte, 64, German-born Swedish countess, breast cancer.
- Alex Close, 86, Belgian road bicycle racer, winner of Tour of Belgium (1955) and Critérium du Dauphiné Libéré (1956).
- Jake Crawford, 80, American Major League Baseball player.
- George Edwards, 87, British footballer (Wales).
- Richard J. Keane, 75, American politician, member of the New York State Assembly.
- Peter Levinson, 74, American music industry biographer, fall.
- Ken Roberts, 83, Australian rules footballer (Richmond).
- Ram Ruhee, 81, Mauritian founder of the National Olympic Committee, IOC member, after long illness.
- James John Skinner, 85, Irish-born Zambian jurist and politician.

=== 22 ===
- Robert Adlard, 92, British Olympic silver medal-winning (1948) field hockey player.
- Robert C. Cannon, 91, American jurist.
- William Warren Conolly, 87, Caymanian politician.
- Lou Dorfsman, 90, American television graphic designer, heart failure.
- David Evans, 73, British politician, MP (1987–1997), cancer.
- Jan Hijzelendoorn, 79, Dutch Olympic cyclist.
- Ernest Kombo, 67, Congolese bishop of Owando, cancer.
- David Lloyd Meredith, 74, British actor.
- Paritosh Sen, 90, Indian artist, chronic obstructive pulmonary disease.

=== 23 ===
- Gianluigi Braschi, 45, Italian film producer (Life Is Beautiful), after long illness.
- Derek Brewer, 85, British mediaevalist.
- Oszkár Csuvik, 83, Hungarian water polo player, Olympic silver medalist (1948).
- Danny Dill, 83, American songwriter ("Long Black Veil").
- Kevin Finnegan, 60, British former European middleweight champion boxer.
- E. Roger Muir, 89, American television producer, stroke.
- Ivo Pukanić, 47, Croatian newspaper editor, assassination by car bomb.
- F. W. Walbank, 98, British scholar of Greek history.

=== 24 ===
- Moshe Cotel, 65, American pianist and composer, natural causes.
- Howard French, 95, British newspaper editor.
- Milton Katselas, 74, American film director, heart failure.
- Premasiri Khemadasa, 71, Sri Lankan musician and composer.
- Geoffrey McLean, 77, British police officer.
- Merl Saunders, 74, American keyboardist (The Grateful Dead), complications from a stroke.
- Xiao Ke, 101, Chinese general in the People's Liberation Army, illness.
- Helmut Zilk, 81, Austrian politician, Mayor of Vienna (1984–1994), heart failure.

=== 25 ===
- John Axon, 48, British actor (The Royal), grandson of John Axon, heart attack.
- Allen Blanchard, 79, Australian politician.
- Gerard Damiano, 80, American adult film director (Deep Throat), stroke.
- Colm Farrelly, 55, Irish record producer who discovered Sinéad O'Connor and The Pale, after short illness.
- Bob Gambold, 79, American football player (Los Angeles Rams, Philadelphia Eagles).
- Irwin Gunsalus, 96, American biochemist, heart failure.
- Amos E. Joel Jr., 90, American inventor, pioneer of the cellphone.
- Federico Luzzi, 28, Italian tennis player, leukemia.
- Muslim Magomayev, 66, Azerbaijani singer.
- Ian McColl, 81, British footballer, team manager for Scotland, natural causes.
- Anne Pressly, 26, American television news anchor (KATV), injuries during home invasion.
- Regal Intention, 23, Canadian Champion Thoroughbred racehorse.
- Estelle Reiner, 94, American singer and actress (When Harry Met Sally...).
- Hal Roth, 81, American sailor and author, lung cancer.
- Tahereh Saffarzadeh, 72, Iranian poet and academic, cancer.
- Maurice Stonefrost, 81, British civil servant.

=== 26 ===
- Abu Ghadiya, 29-30, Syrian militant, shot.
- Delfino Borroni, 110, Italian last known World War I veteran from Italy.
- Gábor Delneky, 76, Hungarian Olympic fencer.
- P. Cameron DeVore, 76, American First Amendment attorney, apparent heart attack.
- Eileen Donaghy, 78, Irish singer, cancer.
- Thomas Dunn, 82, American conductor, heart failure.
- Tony Hillerman, 83, American mystery writer, pulmonary failure.
- S. D. Jones, 63, Antiguan professional wrestler, stroke.
- Pablo Montes, 62, Cuban athlete, heart attack.
- Delmar Watson, 82, American child actor (Mr. Smith Goes to Washington), prostate cancer.

=== 27 ===
- Dean Barnett, 41, American columnist and blogger, complications from cystic fibrosis.
- Chris Bryant, 72, British screenwriter and actor.
- Richard Carr-Gomm, 86, British soldier and philanthropist.
- Charles Dubin, 87, Canadian Chief Justice of Ontario (1990–1996), head of the Dubin Inquiry into drugs in sport, pneumonia.
- Ray Ellis, 85, American musician, conductor and television producer, complications from melanoma.
- Jack Houston, 90, Australian politician, member of the Legislative Assembly of Queensland (1957–1980).
- Karl Kassulke, 67, American football player (Minnesota Vikings), heart attack.
- Heinz Krügel, 87, German footballer and coach, after long illness.
- Ed Levy, 91, American baseball player (Philadelphia Phillies, New York Yankees).
- Es'kia Mphahlele, 88, South African writer and academic, natural causes.
- Frank Nagai, 76, Japanese singer.
- Bernard W. Rogers, 87, American general, Commander of the US European Command (1979–1987).
- Louis Secco, 81, Canadian Olympic gold medal-winning (1952) ice hockey player.
- Roy Stewart, 83, Jamaican-born British actor (Live and Let Die, Doctor Who).
- Andy Young, 83, Scottish footballer (Raith Rovers).

=== 28 ===
- Buck Adams, 52, American pornographic actor and director, complications from heart failure.
- Dina Cocea, 95, Romanian actress, heart attack.
- Kung Te-cheng, 88, Chinese-born Taiwanese 77th generation descendant of Confucius, heart and respiratory failure.
- Alexander Lowen, 97, American psychotherapist.
- Bill Martin, 65, American realist painter, complications of lymphoma.
- Eric Nenno, 47, American murderer and sex offender, execution by lethal injection.
- Pak Song-chol, 95, North Korean politician, Premier (1976–1977), after long illness.
- Paul Pesthy, 70, American Olympic modern pentathlete and fencer.
- Augusto Petró, 90, Brazilian bishop of Uruguaiana (1964–1995), complications from Alzheimer's disease.
- John Ripley, 69, American Marine war hero.
- Allan Scott, 85, Australian businessman and road transport magnate, complications from diabetes and heart condition.
- George Sopkin, 94, American cellist, natural causes.
- Ilus Vay, 85, Hungarian actress.

=== 29 ===
- William Addison, 74, American chess player.
- Shirwa Ahmed, 26, Somali-American bomber, detonation.
- Gerald Arpino, 85, American dancer and choreographer, after long illness.
- Mike Baker, 45, American singer (Shadow Gallery), heart attack.
- Cor Brom, 76, Dutch footballer and coach, Parkinson's disease.
- Giannis Koskiniatis, 25, Greek footballer, suicide by jumping.
- Mae Mercer, 76, American blues singer and actress (Dirty Harry, The Beguiled, Frogs).
- William Wharton, 82, American painter and novelist (Birdy), infection.

=== 30 ===
- Edith Evans Asbury, 98, American journalist (The New York Times), after long illness.
- Fred Baron, 61, American trial lawyer and political fundraiser, multiple myeloma.
- Robert H. Barrow, 86, American general, 27th Commandant of the Marine Corps (1979–1983).
- Cundo Bermúdez, 94, Cuban artist.
- Valentin Bubukin, 75, Russian footballer, after long illness.
- John Cuckney, Baron Cuckney, 83, British financier and industrialist.
- David Jeaffreson, 76, British colonial official, Hong Kong Secretary for Security (1982–1988), ICAC Commissioner (1988–1991).
- Tom Moody, 78, American politician. Mayor of Columbus, Ohio (1972–1984).
- Julius Neave, 89, British insurance executive.

=== 31 ===
- Jonathan Bates, 68, British sound engineer (Gandhi, Flash Gordon, Cry Freedom).
- John Daly, 71, British film producer, cancer.
- Frank Navetta, 46, American guitarist (Descendents).
- Sir John Page, 89, British politician, MP for Harrow West (1960–1987).
- John Pearse, 69, British guitarist.
- Studs Terkel, 96, American broadcaster and author (The Good War), complications from a fall.
