= Marcelo González Martín =

Spanish cardinal

His Eminence Marcelo González Martín
- Cardinal, Archbishop of Toledo
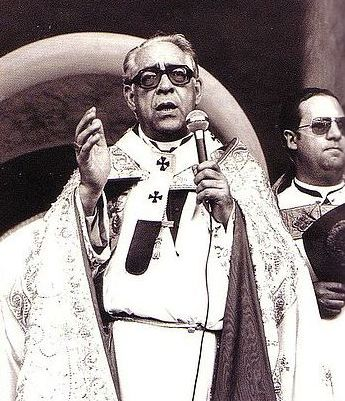
- Church: Roman Catholic
- Archdiocese: Toledo
- Installed: 1971
- Term ended: 23 June 1995
- Predecessor: Vicente Enrique y Tarancón
- Successor: Francisco Álvarez Martínez
- Other post: Cardinal-Priest of Sant’Agostino
- Previous posts: Bishop of Astorga (1960–1966); Coadjutor Archbishop of Barcelona (1966–1967); Archbishop of Barcelona (1967–1971)

Orders
- Ordination: 29 June 1941
- Consecration: 5 March 1961
- Created cardinal: 5 March 1973 by Paul VI
- Rank: Cardinal-Priest

Personal details
- Born: 16 January 1918 Villanubla Spain
- Died: 25 August 2004 (aged 86) Fuentes de Nava, Palencia Spain
- Motto: Pauperes evangelizantur
- Coat of arms

Styles of Marcelo Gonzalez Martin
- Reference style: His Eminence
- Spoken style: Your Eminence
- Informal style: Cardinal
- See: Toledo

Marcelo González Martín (16 January 1918 – 25 August 2004) was a cardinal of the Roman Catholic Church and Archbishop of Toledo and Primate of Spain.

González Martín was born in Villanubla, Valladolid Province as the son of Marcelo González, a small merchant; and Costanza Martín. He was educated at the Seminary of Valladolid and the Pontifical University of Comillas.

== Priesthood ==
He was ordained on 29 June 1941 in Valladolid. From 1941 until 1960 he was, successively, a faculty member of the Seminary of Valladolid; a faculty member of the University of Valladolid; a pastoral worker in the archdiocese of Valladolid; a diocesan chaplain of Catholic Action; the founder of "Patronato de San Pedro Regalado" for construction of houses for poor families; a canon of the cathedral chapter; and a synodal judge. He was created Domestic prelate of His Holiness on 24 March 1960.

== Episcopacy ==
He was appointed bishop of Astorga by Pope John XXIII on 31 December 1960. He was consecrated on 5 March 1961. He attended the Second Vatican Council in Rome from 1962 to 1965. He was promoted to titular archbishop of Case Mediane and coadjutor bishop of Barcelona on 21 February 1966 by Pope Paul VI. He became the Archbishop of Barcelona on 7 January 1967. He was transferred to the metropolitan and primatial see of Toledo on 3 December 1971.

He was created and proclaimed Cardinal-Priest of Sant'Agostino by Pope Paul VI in the consistory of 5 March 1973. He took part in the conclaves that elected Pope John Paul I and Pope John Paul II in August and October. He resigned the pastoral government of the archdiocese on 23 June 1995. He lost the right to participate in a conclave when he turned 80 years of age, 16 January 1998. He died in 2004 in Fuentes de Nava, Palencia.

Catholic Church titles
| Preceded by Gregorio Modrego y Casaus | Archbishop of Barcelona; 7 January 1967 – 3 December 1971 | Succeeded by Narciso Jubany Arnau |
| Preceded by Vicente Enrique y Tarancón | Archbishop of Toledo; 3 December 1971 – 23 June 1995 | Succeeded by Francisco Álvarez Martínez |
| Preceded by Fernando Quiroga y Palacios | Cardinal Priest of Sant'Agostino; 1973–2004 | Succeeded by Jean-Pierre Ricard |
