= Francisco Álvarez Martínez =

Catholic cardinal (1925–2022)

His Eminence Francisco Álvarez Martínez
- Cardinal, Archbishop of Toledo
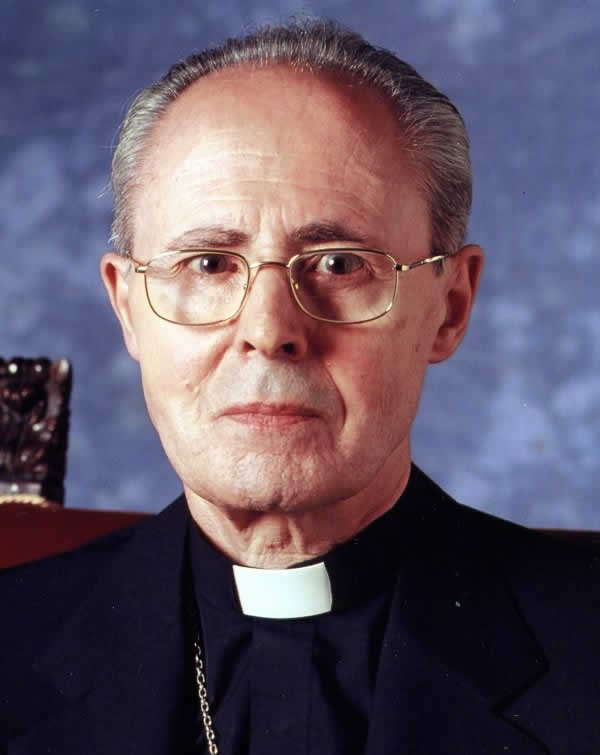
- Installed: 23 June 1995
- Term ended: 24 October 2002
- Predecessor: Marcelo González Martín
- Successor: Antonio Cañizares Llovera
- Other post: Cardinal-Priest of Santa Maria "Regina Pacis" a Monte Verde
- Previous posts: Bishop of Orihuela-Alicante (1989–1995); Bishop of Calahorra y La Calzada-Logroño (1976–1989); Bishop of Tarazona (1973–1976)

Orders
- Ordination: 11 June 1950
- Consecration: 3 June 1973 by Luigi Dadaglio
- Created cardinal: 21 February 2001 by Pope John Paul II
- Rank: Cardinal-Priest

Personal details
- Born: Francisco Álvarez Martínez; 14 July 1925 Llanera, Asturias, Spain
- Died: 5 January 2022 (aged 96) Madrid, Spain
- Denomination: Roman Catholic
- Education: Pontifical University of Salamanca; Comillas Pontifical University
- Motto: Oboedientia et Pax
- Coat of arms

Styles of Francisco Álvarez Martínez
- Reference style: His Eminence
- Spoken style: Your Eminence
- Informal style: Cardinal

Francisco Álvarez Martínez (14 July 1925 – 5 January 2022) was a Spanish prelate of the Catholic Church who was archbishop of Toledo from 1995 to 2002. He was bishop of Tarazona from 1973 to 1976, of Calahorra y La Calzada-Logroño from 1976 to 1989, and of Orihuela-Alicante from 1989 to 1995. He was created a cardinal in 2001.

== Biography ==
Álvarez Martínez was born in the parish of Santa Eulalia de Ferroñes in Llanera, Asturias, on 14 July 1925. He studied at the seminary in Oviedo and was ordained a priest of the Archdiocese of Oviedo on 11 June 1950. He served as the archbishop's secretary from 1950 to 1956 and was chancellor of the archdiocese from 1957 to 1969. He studied canon law at the Pontifical University of Salamanca from 1955 to 1958 and then earned a doctorate in canon law from the Pontifical University of Comillas in 1962.

He was appointed bishop of Tarazona on 13 April 1973 by Pope Paul VI. He was consecrated by Luigi Dadaglio, Apostolic Nuncio to Spain, assisted by Pedro Cantero Cuadrado, Archbishop of Zaragoza, and José Méndez Asensio, Archbishop of Pamplona. He was transferred to the see of Calahora y La Calzada-Logroño on 20 December 1976 and then to the see of Orihuela-Alicante on 12 May 1989. He was appointed Metropolitan Archbishop of Toledo on 23 June 1995.

He was made Cardinal Priest of Santa Maria Regina Pacis a Monte Verde in the consistory of 21 February 2001 by Pope John Paul II.

Pope John Paul accepted his resignation as Archbishop of Toledo on 24 October 2002. Three months before his 80th birthday, Álvarez Martínez was one of the cardinal electors who participated in the 2005 papal conclave that elected Pope Benedict XVI.

Álvarez Martínez died in a Madrid hospital after a long illness on 5 January 2022, at the age of 96.

Catholic Church titles
Preceded by José Méndez Asensio	Bishop of Tarazona; 13 April 1973 – 20 December 1976	Succeeded by Victorio Oliver Domingo
Preceded by Abilio del Campo y de la Barcena	Bishop of Calahorra and La Calzada-Logroño; 20 December 1976 – 12 May 1989	Succeeded by Ramón Búa Otero
Preceded by Pablo Barrachina y Estevan	Bishop of Orihuela-Alicante; 12 May 1989 – 23 June 1995	Succeeded by Victorio Oliver Domingo
Preceded by Marcelo González Martín	Archbishop of Toledo; 23 June 1995 – 24 October 2002	Succeeded by Antonio Cañizares Llovera
Preceded by Antony Padiyara	Cardinal-Priest of Santa Maria Regina Pacis a Monte Verde; 21 February 2001 – 5 January 2022	Vacant
