= Monteverde (Rome) =

Urban zone in Rome, Italy

Villa Doria Pamphili

typical house in Monteverde Vecchio

Monteverde is an urban zone of the quarter Gianicolense in Rome, Italy. It is located just outside the Aurelian Walls, south of the Janiculum hill and southwest of Trastevere. Monteverde means green mountain and is named after a hill upon which the zone is located and which is not part of the classical seven hills of Rome.

== Overview ==
Monteverde is usually divided in two parts, Monteverde Vecchio, a mostly early 20th century neighbourhood of stately villas, and Monteverde Nuovo, most of which consists of semi-highrises, constructed in the second half of the 20th century. It has a large middle-class population.

Monteverde is a residential area outside of Rome's historical centre. The main attraction is Villa Doria Pamphili, which used to be private property of the Pamphili family, but is now a public park, the largest in Rome.

Monteverde is home to The American University of Rome as well as the American Academy in Rome and an undergraduate program specializing in Classical archaeology, the Intercollegiate Center for Classical Studies.

Monteverde was the main base of operations for the Proietti Clan, a criminal organization led by Franco Nicolini and the Proietti brothers, until their destruction in the early 80s at the hands of the Banda della Magliana.

Before it became what it is today, Monteverde was covered with vineyards, where the white and red “vinello” (light wine) typical of Monteverde, was produced.

== See also ==
- Villa Doria Pamphili
- Quattro Venti railway station
- The American University of Rome
- Santa Maria Regina Pacis a Monte Verde
