= Villa Doria Pamphili =

Villa in Rome

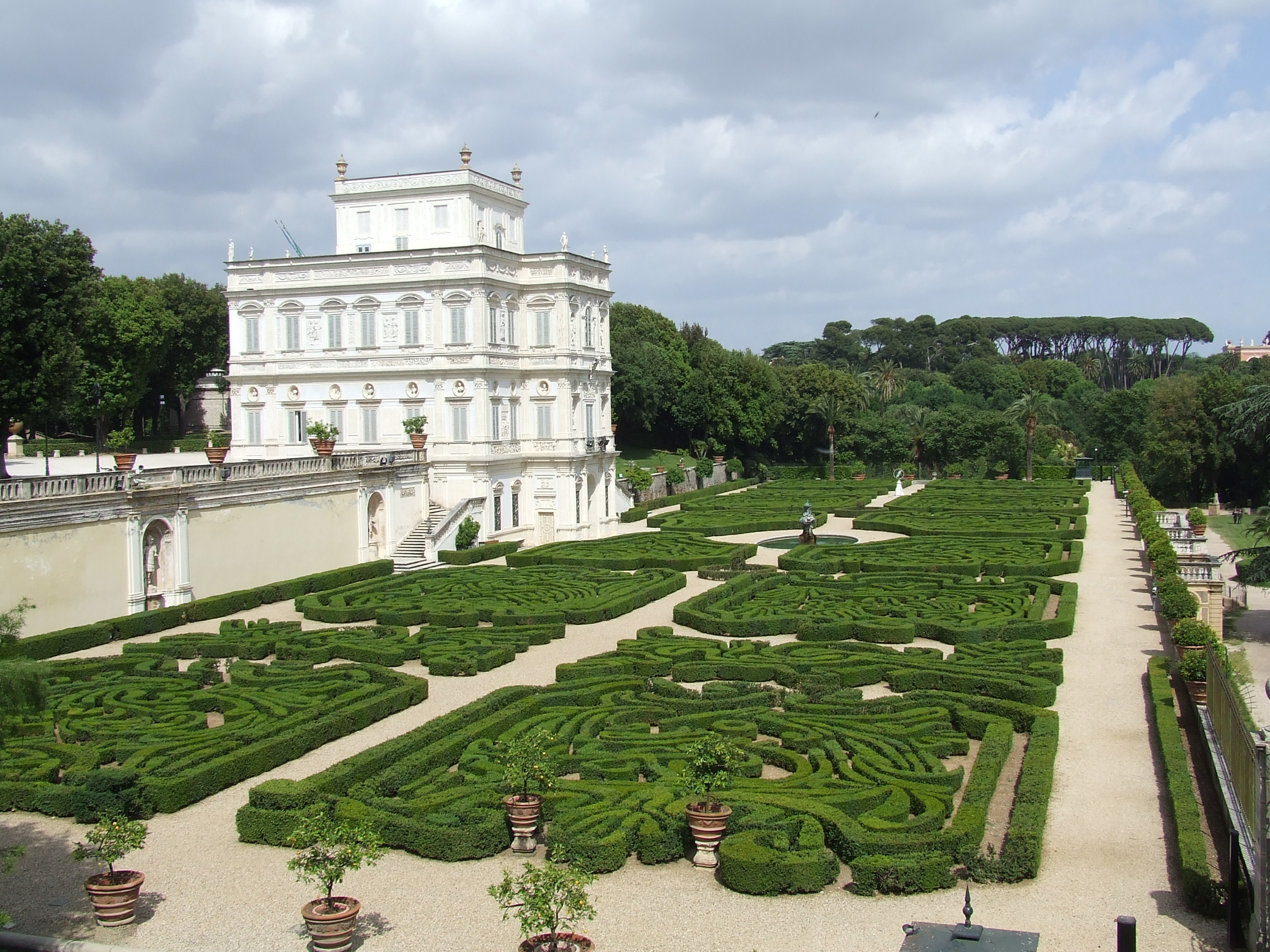
- The Casino del Bel Respiro, Villa Doria Pamphili
- Click on the map for a fullscreen view
- Location: Rome, Italy
- Coordinates: 41°53′17″N 12°27′04″E
- Website: www.villadoriapamphilj.it

The Villa Doria Pamphili is a seventeenth-century villa with what is today the largest landscaped public park in Rome, Italy. It is located in the quarter of Monteverde, on the Gianicolo (or the Roman Janiculum), just outside the Porta San Pancrazio in the ancient walls of Rome where the ancient road of the Via Aurelia commences.

It began as a villa for the Pamphili family and when the line died out in the eighteenth century, it passed to Prince Giovanni Andrea IV Doria, and has been known as the Villa Doria Pamphili since.

== History ==
=== Old villa ===
The nucleus of the villa property, the Villa Vecchia or 'old villa', already existed before 1630, when it was bought by Pamfilio Pamfili, who had married the heiress Olimpia Maidalchini, to enjoy as a suburban villa. Thereafter he set about buying up neighbouring vineyards to accumulate a much larger holding, which was often known as the Bel Respiro or 'beautiful breath' as it stood on high ground, above the malarial areas of Rome, and offered spectacular views which were a desirable feature of Baroque villa settings.

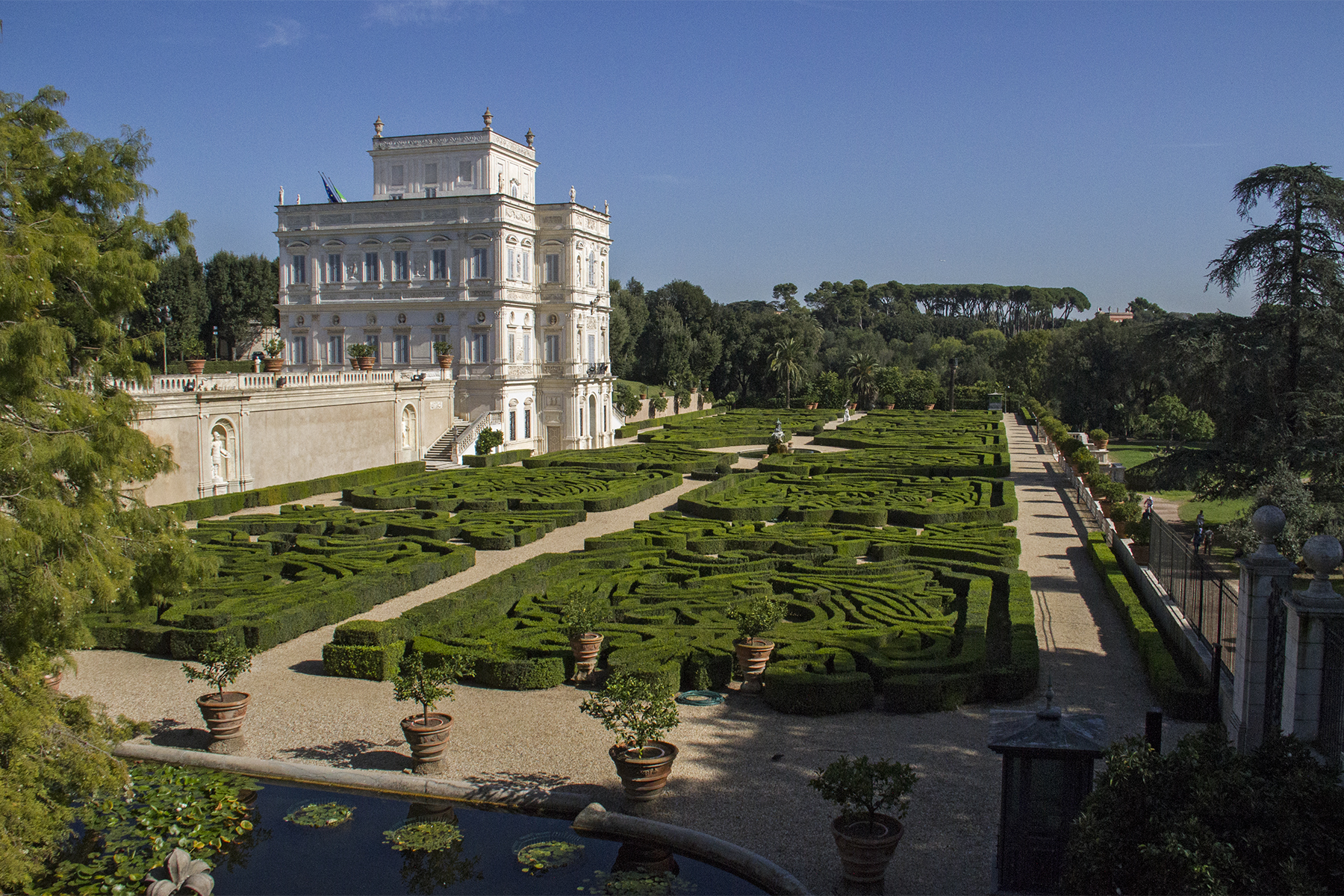
The giardino segreto parterre today

In 1644 Cardinal Giambattista Pamphili became elected to the papacy and took the name of Innocent X. In accordance with this change in status, the Pamphili aspired to a grander and more expansively sited new villa. Early designs were made, possibly by Virgilio Spada rather than the traditional attribution to Borromini, but these were rejected. Instead the project was placed in the hands of the Bolognese sculptor Alessandro Algardi in 1644, assisted by Giovanni Francesco Grimaldi.

The initial design had a central casino (a house in the original meaning of the term) with wings, but only the central block was built. There is uncertainty as to who the architect was; Algardi was not an architect, and it may be that he had help from Carlo Rainaldi and that the construction was supervised by Grimaldi. The layout has a central circular room around which the other rooms were arranged. Construction began in 1645 and was complete by 1647 although embellishments and the garden layouts were not finished until 1653. The casino, sometimes known as the Casino del Bel Respiro, was designed as a complement to the Pamphili collection of sculptures both ancient and modern, and other Roman antiquities such as vases, sarcophagi and inscriptions; it was only ever intended for display of the collection and the family and guests resided in the older Vecchia Vigna.

As a show case for sculpture, the somewhat crowded Casino facades have rhythmically alternating windows with niches which were elaborately adorned with sculptures, both antique and modern, with busts in hollowed roundels, with panels of bas-reliefs, and reliefs.

==== Landscape gardens ====
The exterior containing statues gives a rich allure that was architecturally somewhat conservative for its date, looking back towards the Villa Medici or the Casina Pio IV, and rather more Mannerist than Baroque. It offered a foretaste of the richly stuccoed and frescoed interiors, where the iconographic program set out to establish the antiquity of the Pamphili, a family then somewhat parvenu in Rome, with origins in Gubbio. Inside, Algardi provided further bas-reliefs and stucco framing for the heroic frescoes drawn from Roman history painted by Grimaldi.

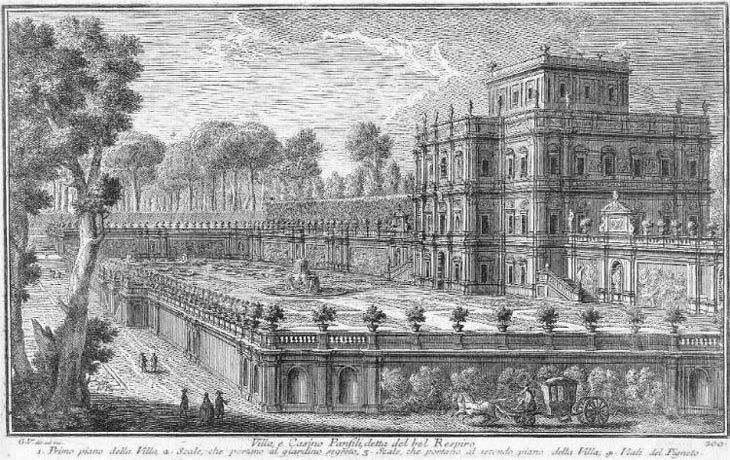
The Casino in G. Vasi's etching, c 1740, shows the giardino segreto of the lower terrace, ordinarily visible only from the casino and the upper terraces; orange trees in pots punctuate its balustrades. Vasi merely indicates the patterned parterre beds on the lowest level, later swept away by the familiar extensive landscape.

The casino is set into the hill slope such that the main entrance on the north side is at a level above the giardino segreto or ‘secret garden’ enclosure on its south side, a parterre garden with low clipped hedges. The gardens on the sloping site were laid out from around 1650 by Innocent's nephew, Camillo Pamphili, formalizing the slope as a sequence from the parterres that flank the Casino, to a lower level below, framed by the boschi or formalized woodlands that rose above clipped hedges, and eventually arriving at a rusticated grotto in the form of an exedra, from which sculptured figures emerge from the rock-work. The exedra, now grassed, formerly framed a 'Fountain of Venus' by Algardi, which is preserved in the Villa Vecchia, together with Algardi's bas-reliefs of putti representing Love and the Arts that were formerly here. The fountain spilled into a small cascade that let into a short length of formal canal, which was intended to remind the viewer of the similar "Canopus" at Hadrian's Villa— another programmatic connection of the Pamphili with Antiquity.

=== Villa Doria Pamphili ===
Girolamo Pamphili died in 1760 without male heirs. The resulting disputes between possible heirs were settled in 1763. when Pope Clement XIII Rezzonico granted to Prince Giovanni Andrea IV Doria the right to take the surname, the arms and the vast properties of the Pamphili. The Prince's claim was based on the marriage between Giovanni Andrea III Doria and Anna Pamphili. Since then, the villa has been known as the Villa Doria Pamphili.

Throughout the 18th century, features were regularly added such as fountains and gateways by Gabriele Valvassori and other architects retained by the Pamphili and their heirs. After the Napoleonic era, more sweeping changes were made. The parterres that were formal extensions of the casino were retained but replanted with the patterned planting of colourful carpet bedding supplied from greenhouses by the old villa. (Today the parterres have been replanted in 16th-century style, with panels of scrolling designs in close-clipped greens set in wide gravel walks.) In the sloping outer gardens the changes were more extensive, recasting them in the naturalistic manner of English landscape gardens. The grounds, filled with many surprise features and picturesque incidents, swept down to a small lake at the bottom, which already had an air of atmospheric maturity when it was painted in the 1830s by Alexandre-Gabriel Decamps. In the wooded, natural-appearing landscapes with clumps of characteristic umbrella-like stone pines along horizons stand statues and vases, which evoke a nostalgic antiquity. The 18th-century English landscape gardens such as Stowe and Stourhead that were the inspiration for this style aimed to bring to life the Italian landscapes with Roman ruins painted by Claude and Poussin. A notable difference is that at the Villa Doria Pamphili's giardino inglese the Roman remains are likely to be genuine. The site of the villa contained several Roman tombs that yielded vases, sarcophagi and inscriptions that were added to the Pamphili collection.

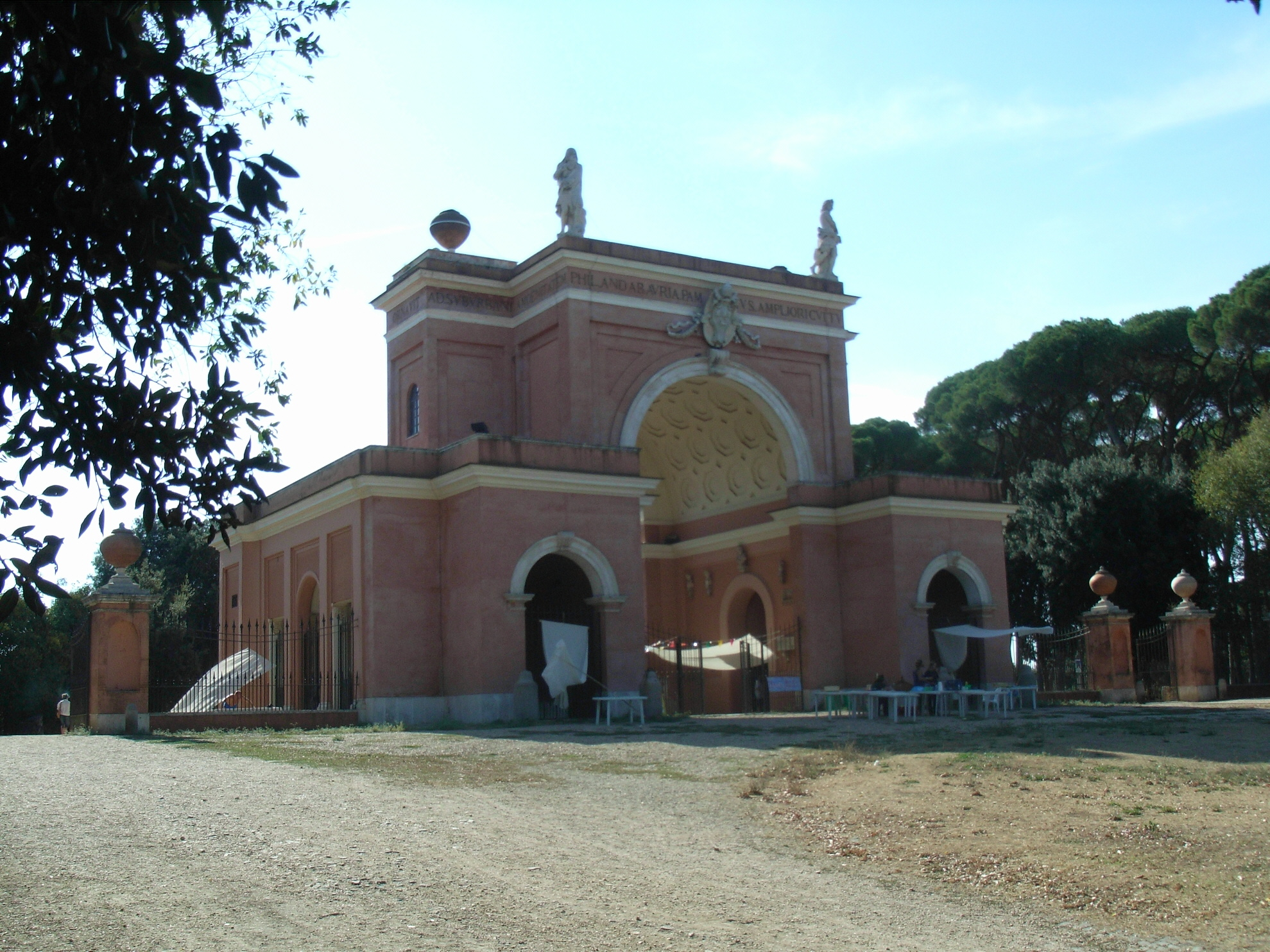
The "Arch of the Four Winds" on the site of the former villa Corsini

During the defense of the short-lived Roman Republic in 1849–1850, Garibaldi hastily fortified three of the villas on the outskirts of Rome. The Villa Doria Pamphili lay near the scene of some of the fiercest hand-to-hand combat by the Porta San Pancrazio, as students joined Garibaldi's legions to defend Rome from the French troops that were eventually successful in reinstalling Pope Pius IX. In the course of the French bombardment, the prominently-sited neighboring Villa Corsini—called dei Quattro Venti for its airy perch— was destroyed. In the aftermath prince Doria-Pamphili bought the extensive Corsini grounds, almost doubling the Villa Doria Pamphili's already extensive grounds, and erected on the former villa's site the monumental commemorative arch, also known as the ‘Arch of the Four Winds’, which has ever since provided the major access to the Villa's grounds. The Corsini casina near it, called the Palazzino Corsini, was not harmed. Today it is used for temporary art exhibitions.

Around 1929 it was suggested that the Villa Doria Pamphili could be annexed to the new state of Vatican through the Lateran Treaty, but this proposal was not adopted in the final version of the Treaty.

New constructions extended and altered the Villa Vecchia which was given a Romanesque styled façade that is not wholly successful. For the first time, Medieval sculptures were added to the Doria-Pamphili collection of Classical antiquities. At the turn of the 20th century, Art Nouveau interiors were added by Prince Doria Pamphili. The Casino del Bel Respiro, long secluded from public use, was bought by the Italian State in 1957 and used as the seat of a Ministry. Today its collection of antiquities and sculptures is open to the public as a museum.

The park has an area of 1.8 km^{2}. It was bought in 1965–1971 by the City of Rome from the Doria-Pamphilii-Landi family. The park's facilities include sites for bird-watching and jogging, and it is much frequented by the inhabitants of Rome, especially on weekends.

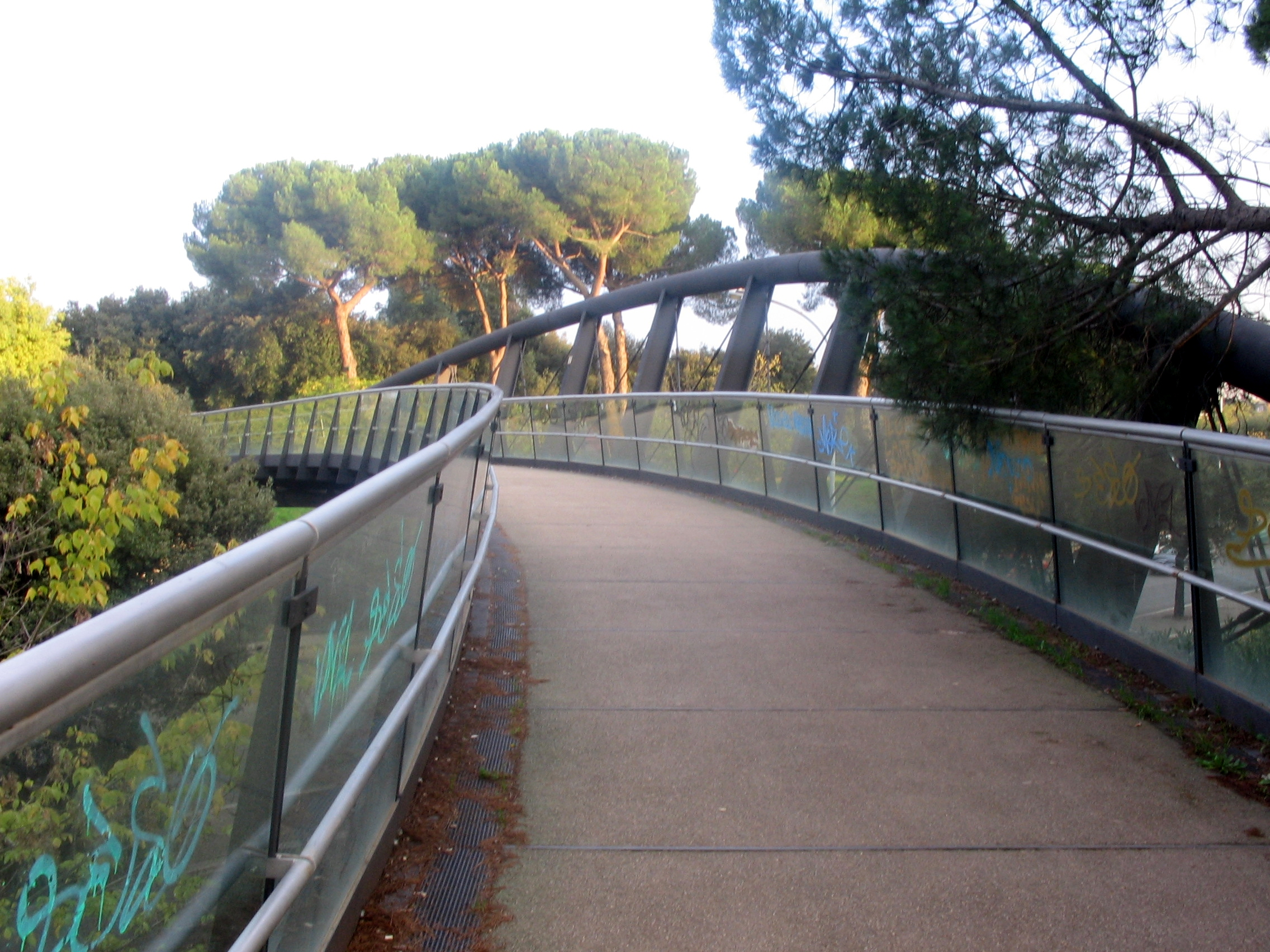
Arup's curving bridge now links the gardens' sections

The two sections of the extended villa grounds are divided by a road built for the Olympic games of 1960 as part of the "Via Olimpica", linking E.U.R. with the Olympic Stadium: the road runs partly in a narrow defile. In celebration of the Jubilee Year of 2000, a curved and arching pedestrian bridge designed by MdAA and built by Ove Arup Group was built to join the two sections more amenably.

== Gallery ==
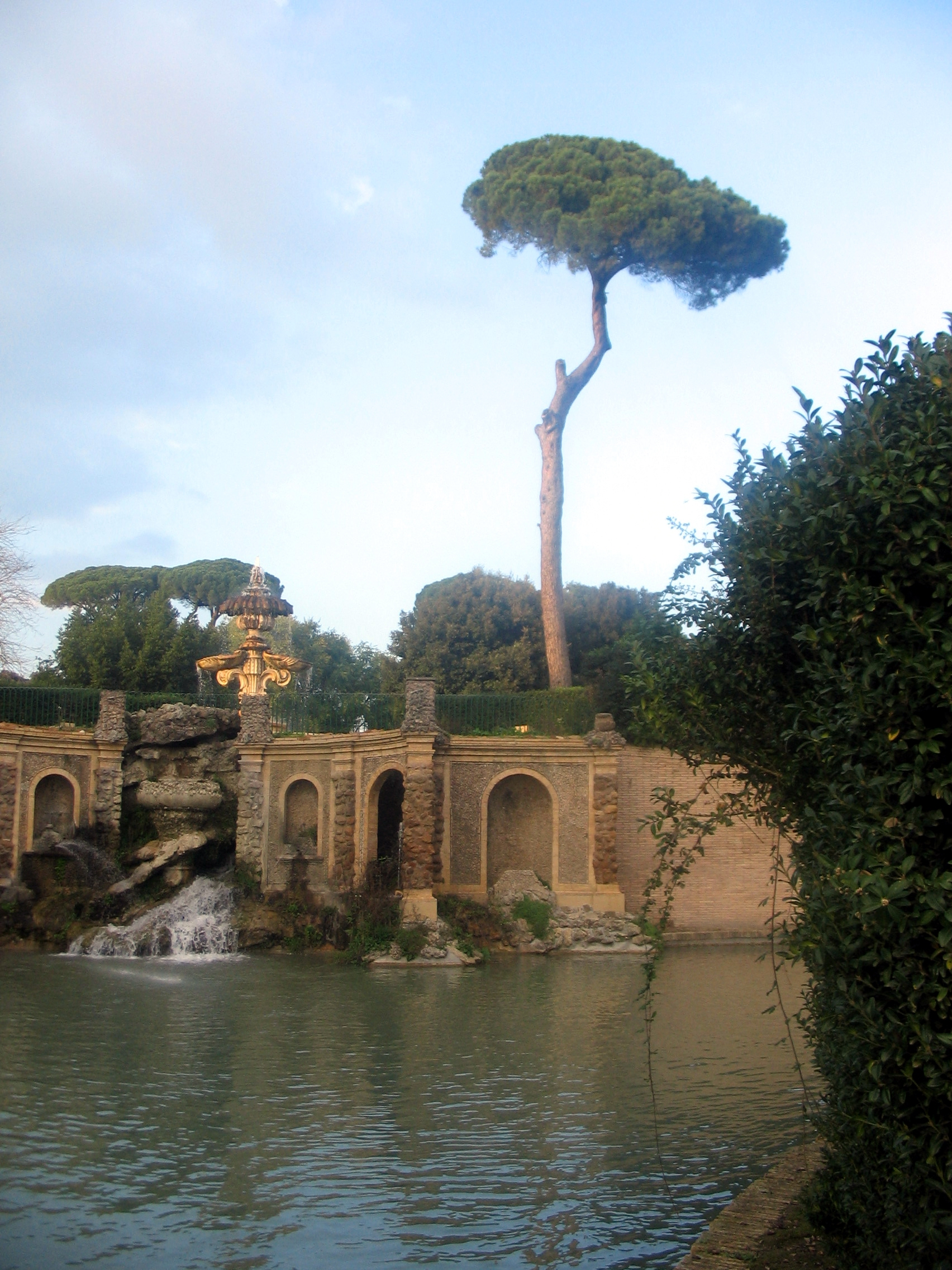
Laghetto

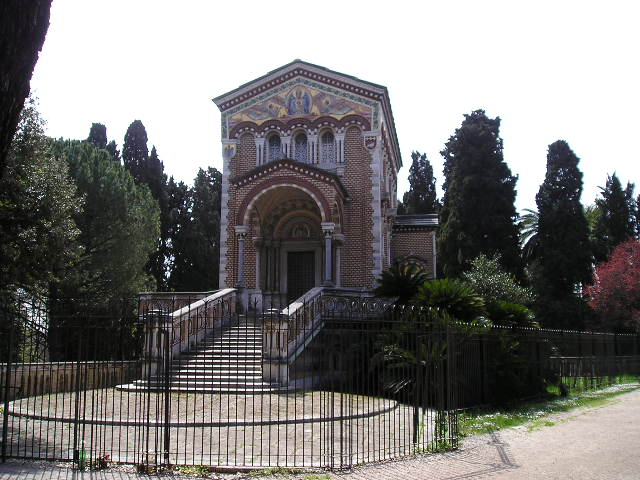
The chapel

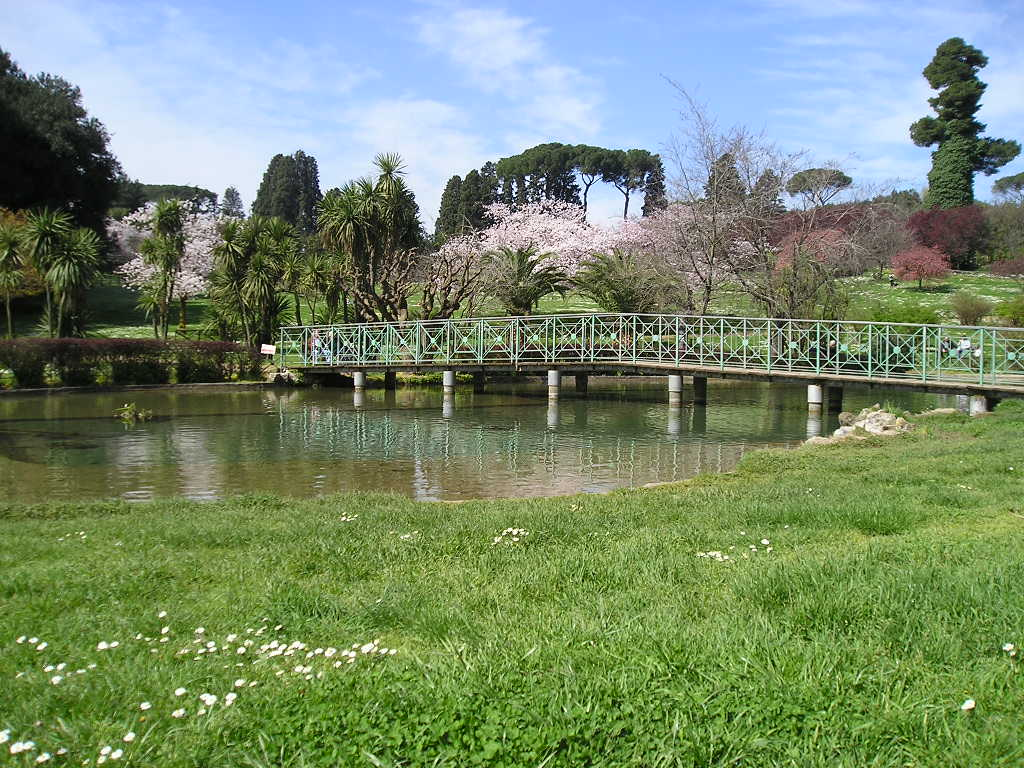
The pond

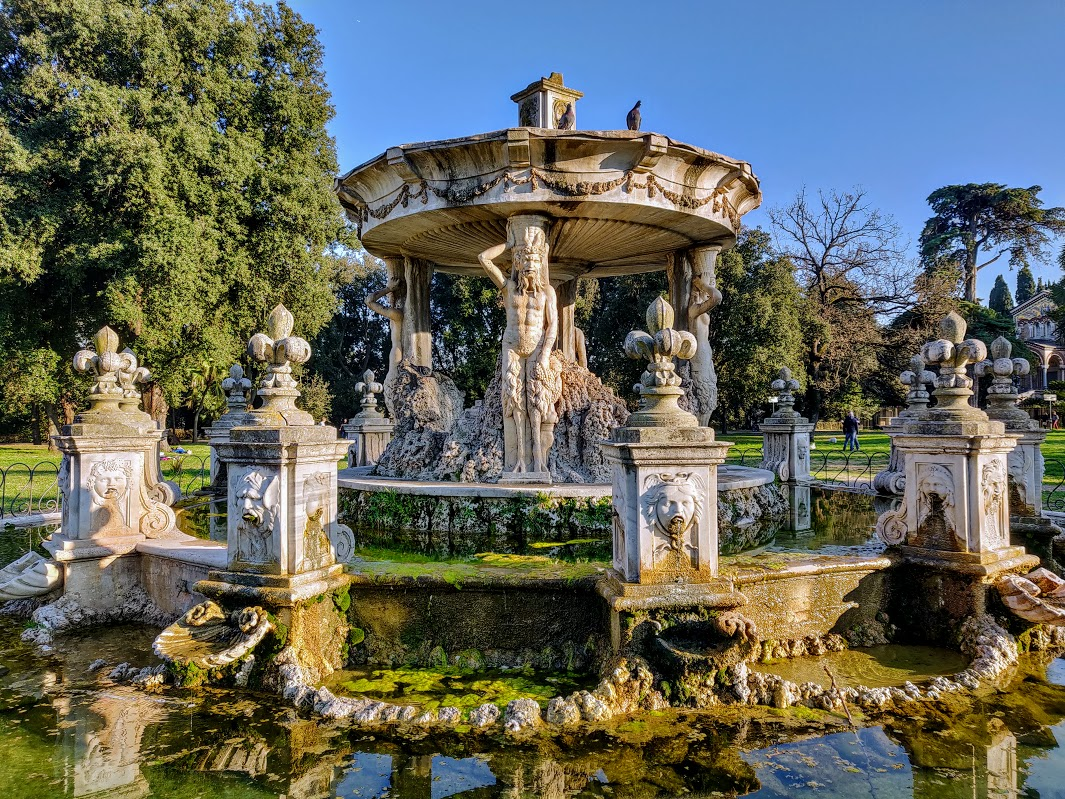
Fontana del Cupido

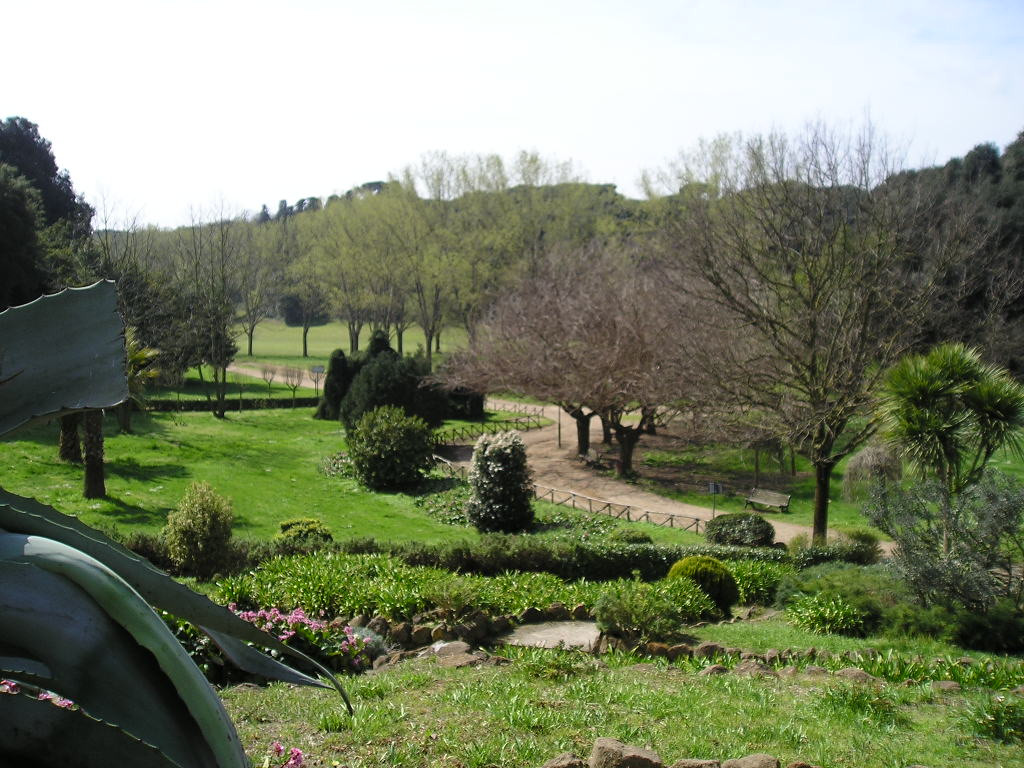
Panorama

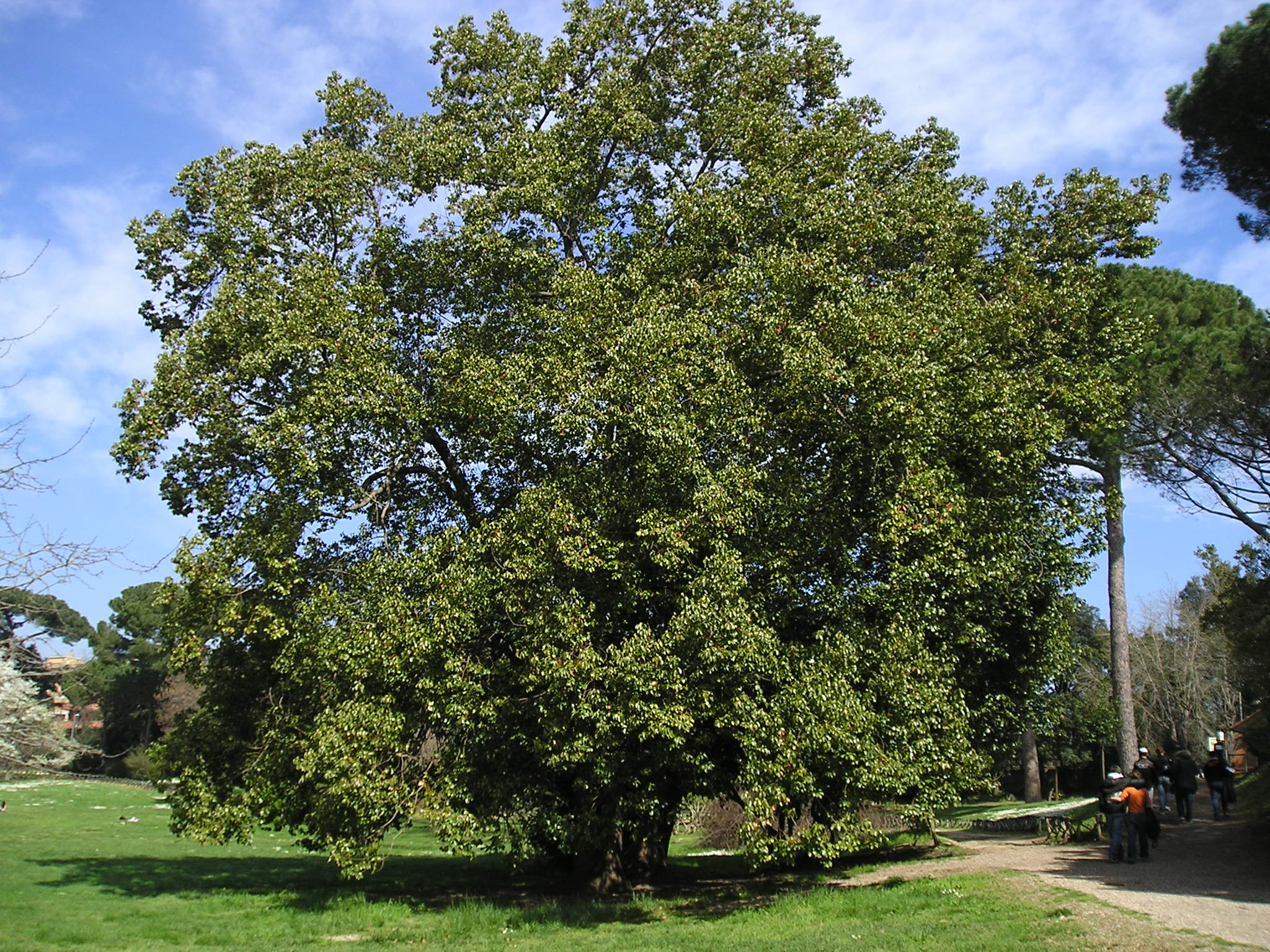
The large oak

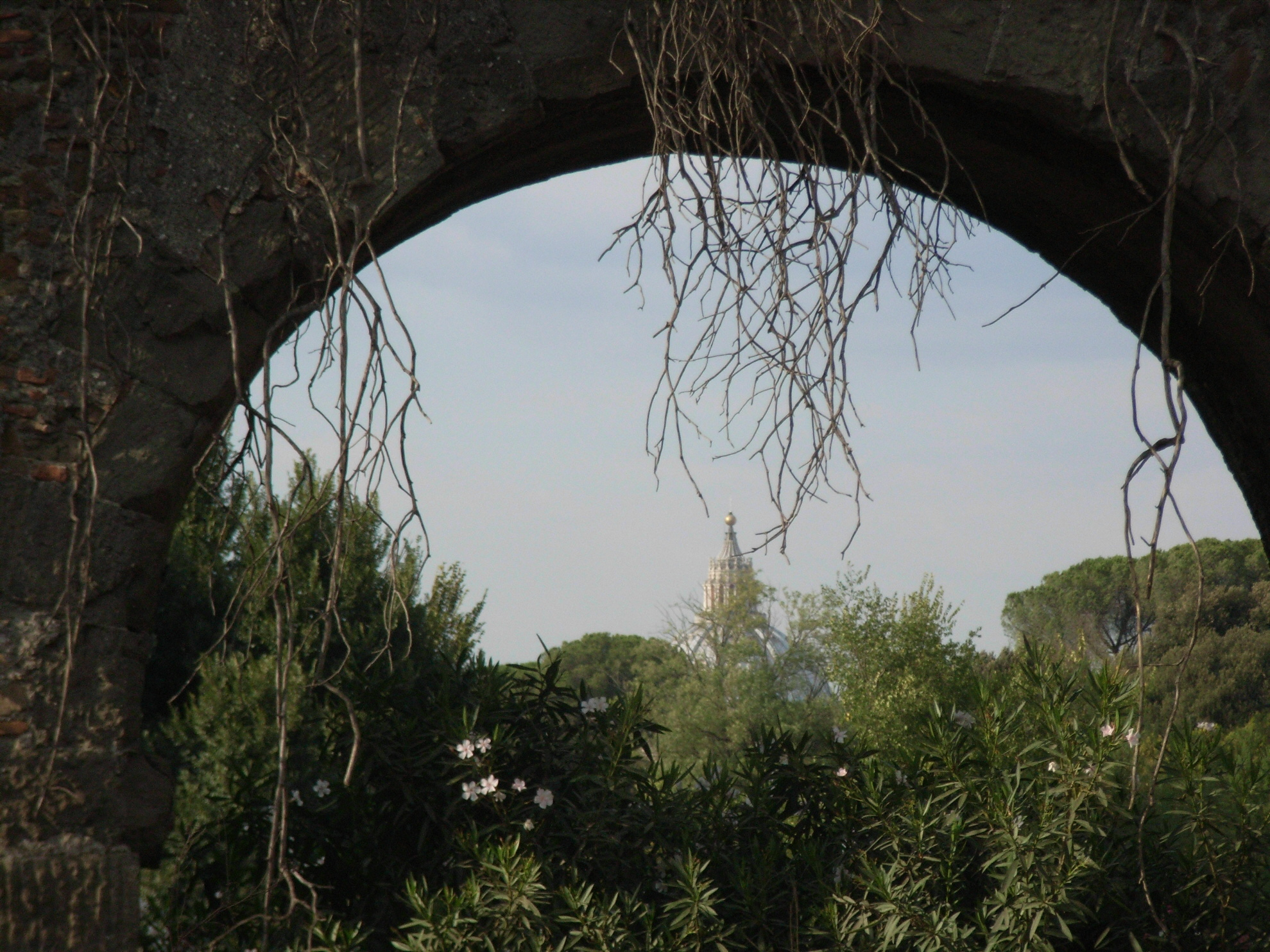
View of the Dome of the St. Peter's Basilica in the Vatican

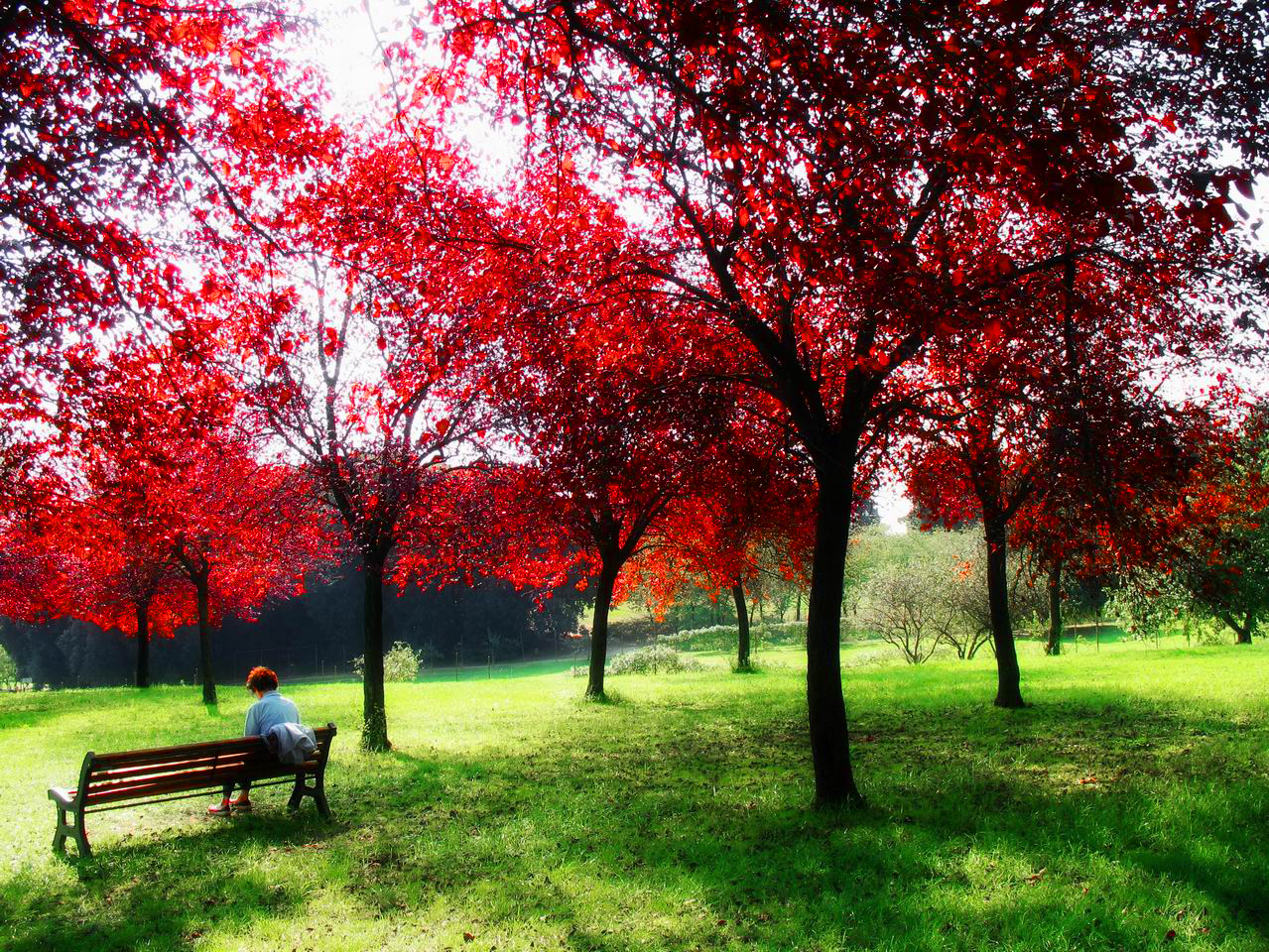
Spring

== See also ==
- List of parks and gardens in Rome

Preceded by Villa Borghese gardens	Landmarks of Rome; Villa Doria Pamphili	Succeeded by Villa Medici
