= Santa Maria Regina Pacis a Monte Verde =

Catholic titular church in Rome

- Church of Saint Mary Queen of Peace in Monteverde
- Chiesa di Santa Maria Regina Pacis a Monte Verde
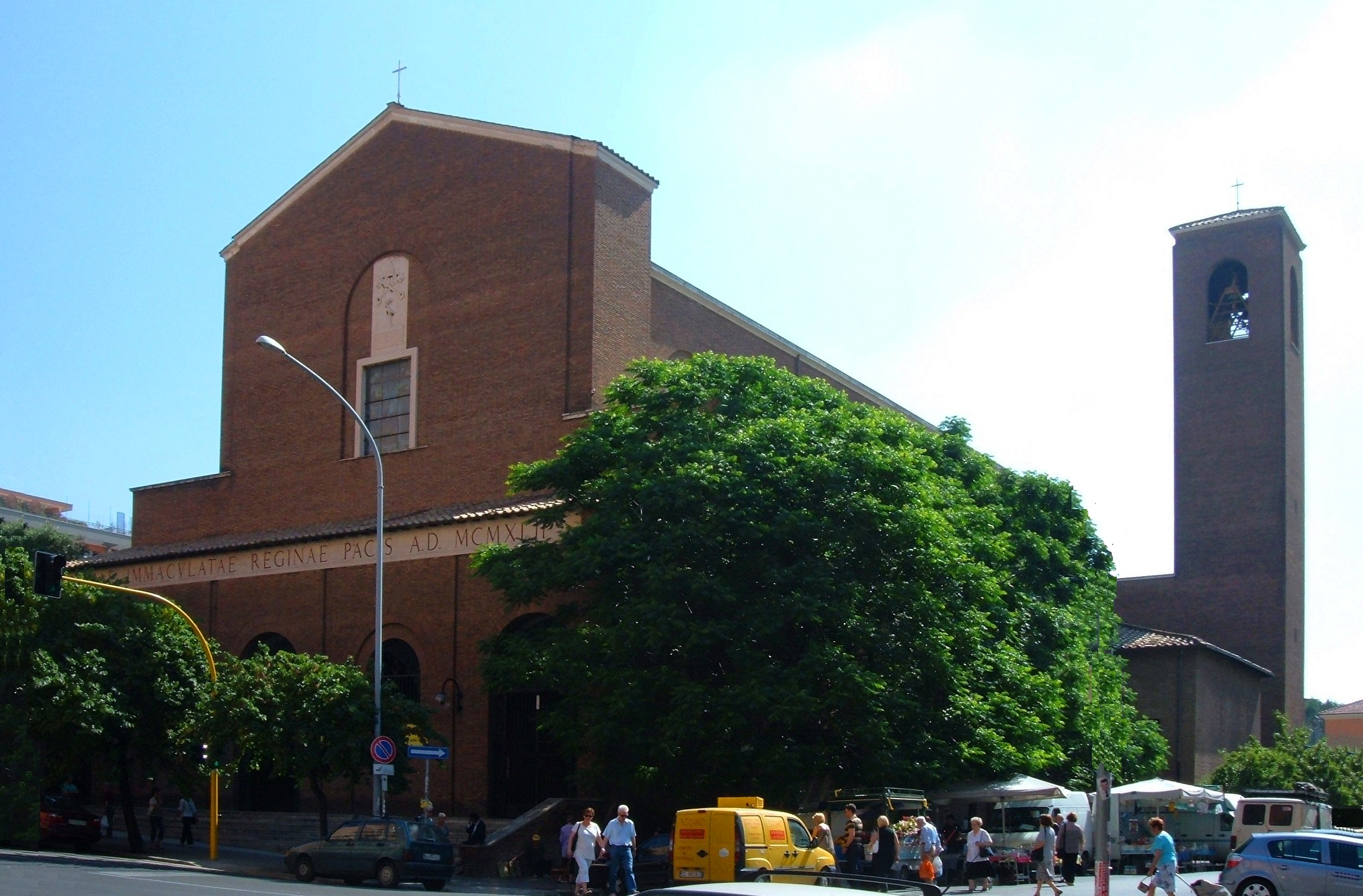
- Exterior with campanile
- Click on the map for a fullscreen view
- 41°52′53″N 12°27′41″E
- Location: Via Maurizio Quadrio 21, Monteverde, Gianicolense, Rome
- Country: Italy
- Language: Italian
- Denomination: Catholic
- Tradition: Roman Rite
- Website: reginapacismonteverde.it

History
- Status: titular church, parish church
- Dedication: Mary, Queen of Peace
- Consecrated: 11 April 1942; 84 years ago

Architecture
- Architect: Tullio Rossi
- Architectural type: Rationalist, Romanesque Revival
- Groundbreaking: 29 March 1925; 101 years ago
- Completed: 1942; 84 years ago

Administration
- Diocese: Rome

Santa Maria Regina Pacis a Monte Verde is a 20th-century parochial church and titular church in Monteverde, central Rome.

== History ==
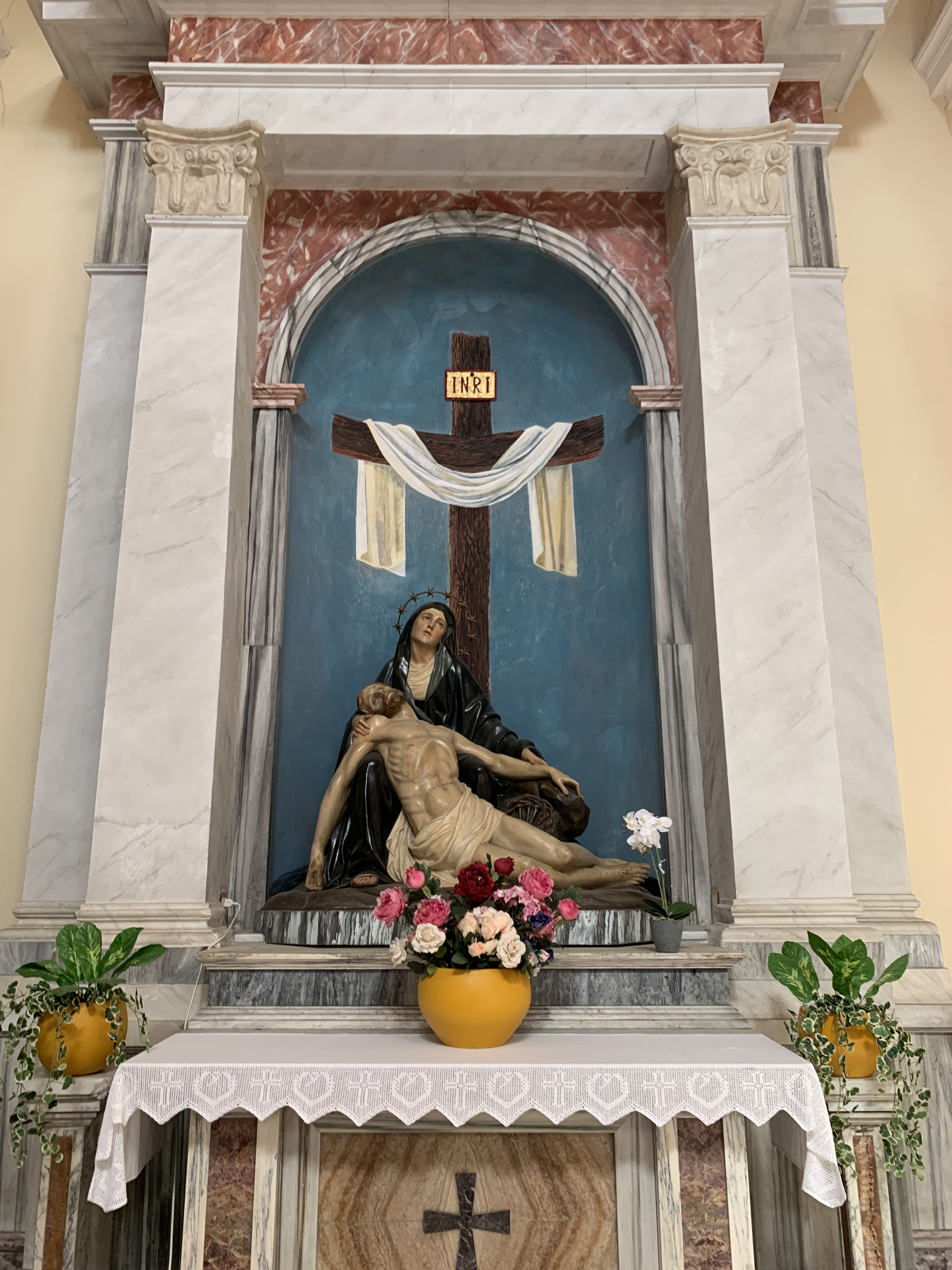
View of an altar

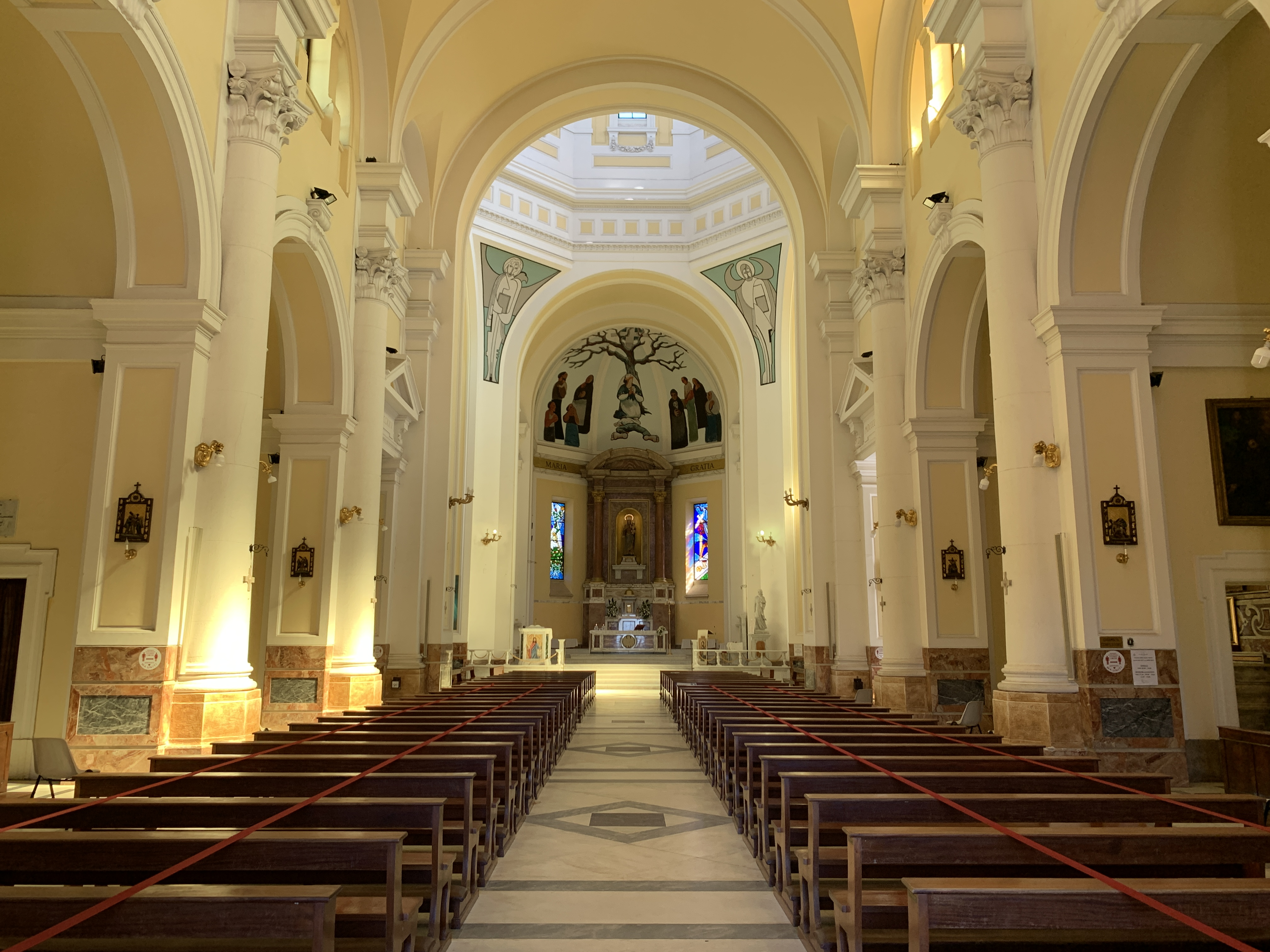
Interior

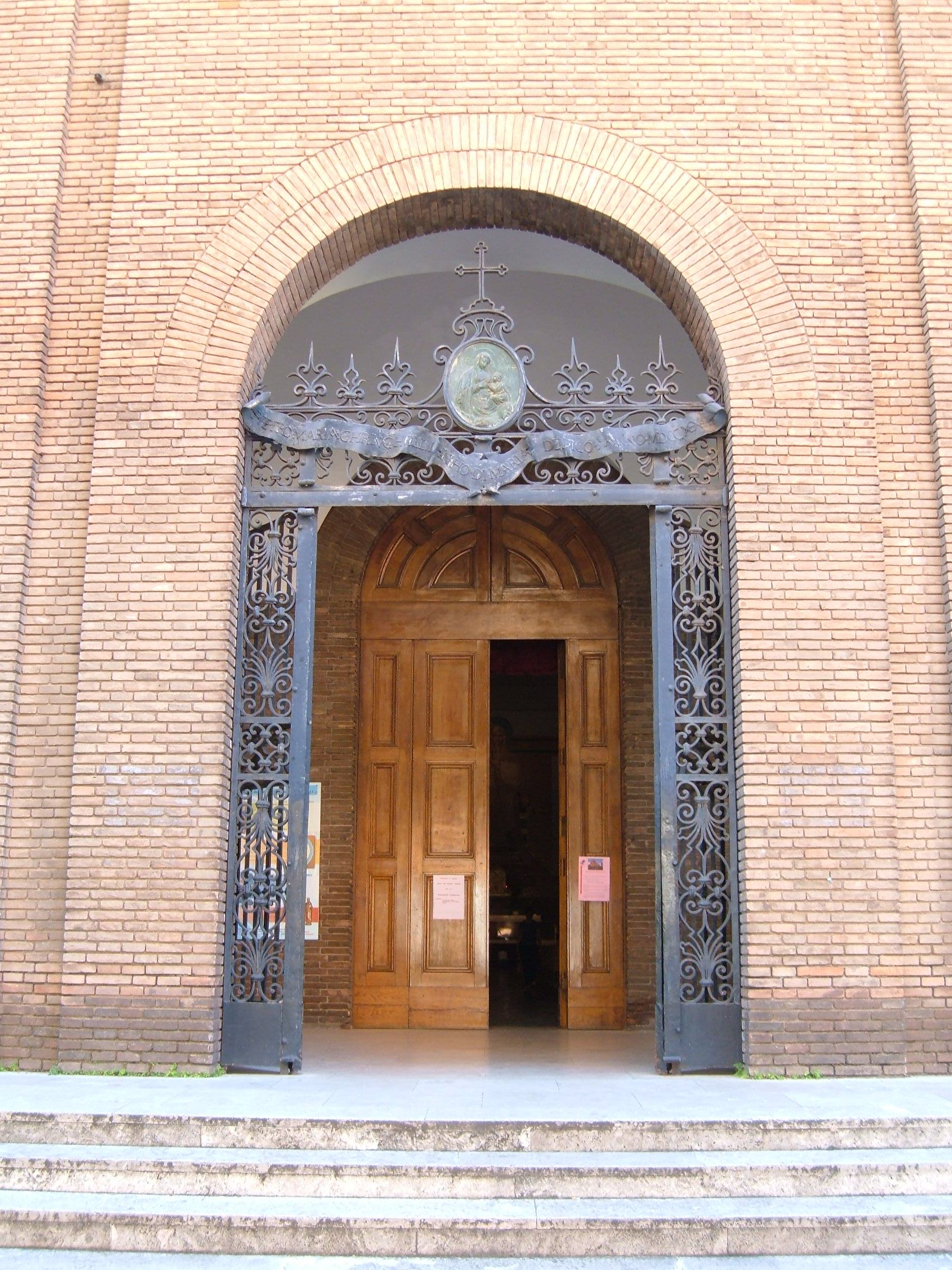
Church door

The first church for the Monteverde area was built in 1915. The present church was begun in 1925 but construction was stopped until 1931; construction was not complete until 1941. Thirty Jews were hidden in the church for a month during the Second World War.

The mosaic of the Virgin and Child was added by Silvio Novaro in 1949–54. From 1959 twenty-two paintings depicting the life of Mary were added; they were destroyed in a fire in 1980.

On 30 April 1969, it was made a titular church to be held by a cardinal-priest. Pope John Paul II visited in 1983.

Cardinal-protectors

- Joseph Parecattil (1969–1987)
- Antony Padiyara (1988–2000)
- Francisco Alvarez Martínez (2001–2022)
- Oscar Cantoni (2022–present)
