= Julius Neave =

English insurance executive

Julius Arthur Sheffield Neave CBE, JP, DL (Essex) (17 July 1919 – 30 October 2008) was an English insurance executive.

== Early life ==
Neave was the second son and youngest of three children of Colonel Richard Neave, of the Essex Regiment, Assistant Inspector of Musketry to the New Zealand Military Forces during World War I (descended from Sir Thomas Neave, 2nd Baronet), and Helen Elizabeth Mary (d. 1976), daughter of Robert Miller, of Ingatestone, Essex, Neave was educated at Sherborne. The politician Airey Neave was a first cousin.

== Career ==
Although Neave attained his School Certificate and succeeded in qualifying for matriculation exemption, and it was intended that he would go to university, the impending war led to changes to this plan, and he joined a small family insurance firm, Mercantile & General Reinsurance, run by Sir Richard Guinness, of the banking family. Having done barely a year's apprenticeship as a clerk, Neave was commissioned into the 13th/18th Hussars, with whom he saw active service as an officer in the Second World War from 1940 until 1944, reaching the rank of Major.

In his later career, Neave was an insurance executive, regarded as a leading figure in the Lloyd's of London insurance market, retiring as general manager (and managing director) of the Mercantile & General Reinsurance Company in 1982. He also served as president of the Insurance Institute of London in 1976, director of Prudential Corporation plc from 1982 to 1992, president of the Chartered Insurance Institute from 1983 to 1984, and president of the Geneva Association from 1983 to 1986.

Neave was a justice of the peace for Brentwood, and appointed deputy lieutenant of Essex in 1983. He was high sheriff of Essex from 1987 to 1988.

== Personal life ==
Neave lived at Mill Green Park, Ingatestone, Essex. On 25 April 1951, he married Helen Margery (1921-2010), daughter of Colonel Percy Morland Acton-Adams, DSO, JP, of the New Zealand Mounted Rifles. They had three daughters.
