= Bonnie Bluh =

American novelist

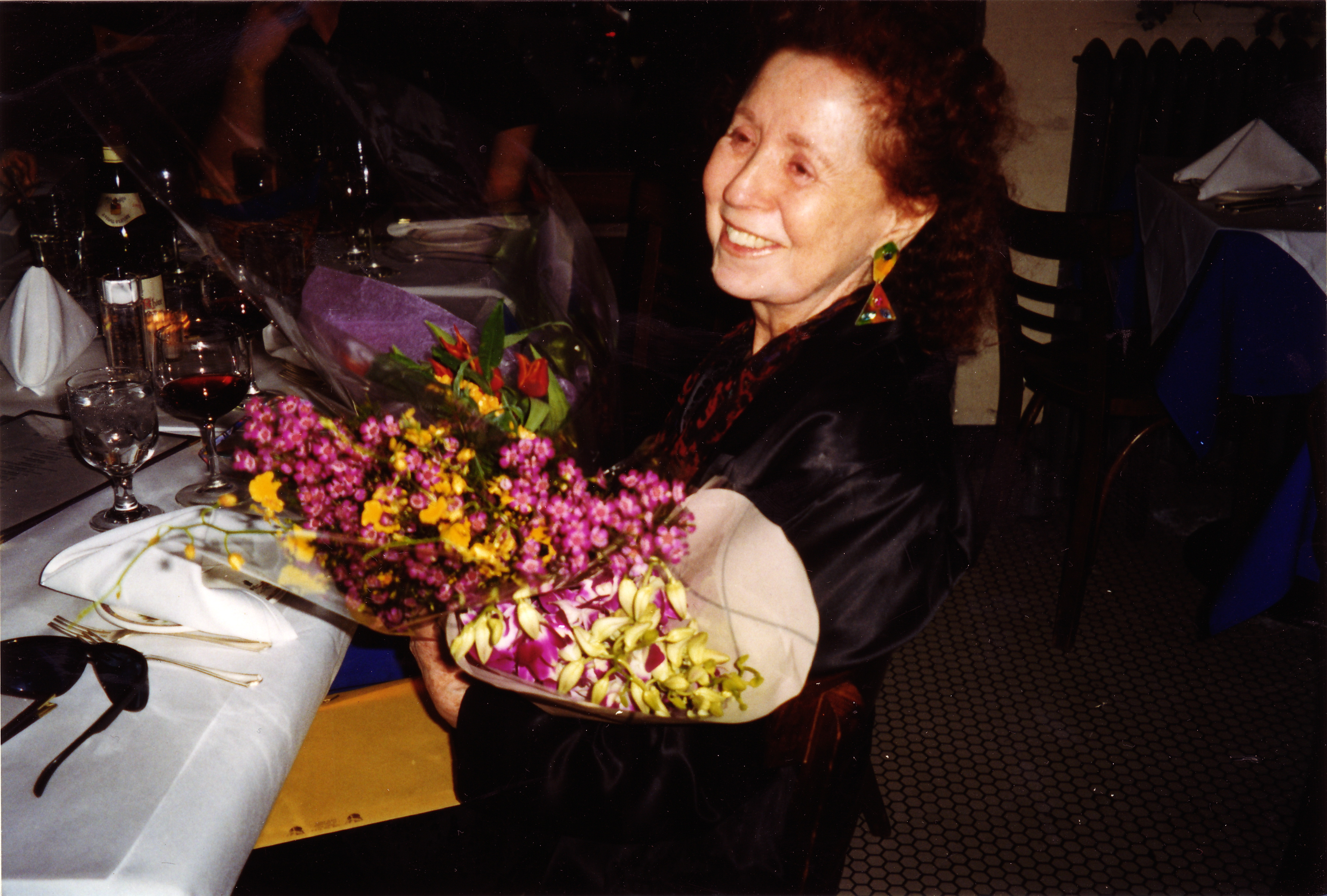
- Born: Helen Celia Bluh; March 29, 1926; New York City, United States
- Died: October 2, 2008 (aged 82); New York City, United States
- Occupations: Novelist; essayist; publisher; speaker; actor
- Children: Craig Lowy (born 1953), Kenn Lowy (born 1957), Brian Lowy (born 1959)
- Writing career
- Notable works: Woman to Woman, Banana, The Old Speak Out, The Eleanor Roosevelt Girls

Bonnie Bluh (March 29, 1926 – October 2, 2008), born Helen Celia Bluh was a Jewish-American feminist novelist and essayist.

== Biography ==
Helen Celia Bluh was born March 29, 1926, in New York City, to Morris Bluh and Mary Steinberg.

Bluh, as friends and family knew her, was brought up in Sunnyside, Queens, a neighborhood that has repeatedly appeared in her novels.

Bluh made her first appearance as a singer at the age of three on the Hearns Radio Children's Hour. As she always liked to recount, she wrote her first play when she was 7 years old and set it in Africa, writing all the dialogue in a made-up language. It was staged at P.S. 150, the first New York progressive school she was attending and starred her fellow students.

At the age of 14, while working in the Borscht Belt, she changed her name from Helen to Bonnie, because she had decided she needed a better name to fit her new career as a singer.

She married in 1946, and four years later, she and her husband Max Lowy moved to California, where Bluh immediately became involved with the Pasadena Playhouse acting in various productions, including A Streetcar Named Desire, as well as trying her hand at directing.

In the 1960s, living in New Jersey, she joined The New Dramatists in New York City and assisted many Broadway directors including Jules Irving at what was then the brand new Repertory Theater of Lincoln Center (1965–1973).

Before their divorce, in 1969, Max and Bonnie (as she was still known at the time) raised three sons: Craig, Kenn, and Brian.

In the 1960s, she lived in Philadelphia where she was on the local National Organization for Women speakers bureau and formed one of the earliest Consciousness raising groups. Consciousness Raising groups consisted of women, without the interference of men, discussing and analyzing their lives, sharing their problems with each other and, more importantly, understanding these shared problems rose from society's systematic oppression of women.

In 1971, Bluh left for Europe to write a book. The result was Woman to Woman (1974), her non-fiction account of the emergence of the second wave of the European feminist movement. Bluh was the first second wave American feminist to meet with the feminists of Ireland, England, the Netherlands, France, Italy and Spain.

When her agent was unable to get the book published because it was considered too personal and too angry, Bluh founded Starogubski Press and published the book herself. Woman to Woman is considered a "landmark account of the second wave of feminism", a book that has been used in the classrooms of over 60 colleges.

Her next book, was the novel, Banana (1976). The publisher, Macmillan, promoted the novel as "the raunchiest, funniest story ever written by a woman." Though many reviewers (almost all male) at the time found it too angry, one female reviewer commented, "This is a novel with a raised consciousness, a mature, intelligent novel of real talent and excitement Doubting Thomases have claimed the feminist movement has yet to produce. Bonnie Bluh, herself an actress-playwright-singer-dancer, has done it."

Banana was quickly followed by another non-fiction book, The Old Speak Out (1979), published by Horizon Press, which was an account of aging in America. As one reviewer wrote, "This extraordinary confrontation between one gutsy woman and a lot of other people amounts to so much more than a series of interviews. Because of Bonnie Bluh we can reach into places most of us don’t attempt in person, risking little and finding a hundred new friends."

Through the 1970s, she wrote everything from articles about feminism to movie reviews for various weeklies including The Soho News and N.Y. Women's Weekly. She was also a guest on various radio and TV shows and conducted writing seminars in New York City, as well as Stockholm, Moscow and Tel Aviv.

In 1985, Bluh had moved to the Westbeth Artists Community in the West Village. In a building filled with artists of all stripes she was known as one of the more outgoing, colorful characters.

After a string of agents had trouble finding a publisher for her next novels, Bluh picked what she considered the most popular of the lot and once again chose the self-publishing route. The Eleanor Roosevelt Girls (1998), a saga of female friendship and betrayal, follows six Sunnyside, Queens girls from 1942 to 92. It was perhaps less incendiary than her earlier work, or perhaps the times had just changed.

In the first years of the 21st century, Bluh, who never gave up her love of theater, edited, along with the New Dramatists Alumni Committee, "Broadway's Fabulous Fifties" (2002).

Bluh had finished her untitled memoir just before her death. It is a book about the approach of death; her death. It was a comical late-in-life Bildungsroman including versions of her own obituary.

== Bibliography ==
- Woman To Woman (Starogubski Press, 1974, ISBN 978-0-9603234-0-1)

In 1971 she traveled to Europe intending to finish her novel Banana. She was invited to the Irish Parliament, which sent her in search of Irish feminists. After meeting them she continued her search in England, France, the Netherlands, Italy, and Spain. Bluh was "the first American feminist to meet with women in Ireland, Italy, and Spain and was on the first abortion march held in Rome in 1971." She was forced to go underground with the Spanish feminists. The result of this year in Europe led to the book Woman to Woman, which has been used in over fifty woman's studies programs.

In her review in Majority Report Kit Kennedy wrote, "Rarely has the print media lent itself to such a high level of consciousness raising... Woman to Woman, a seemingly quiet book, may be the first book on honest politics." Karen Lindsey in the Boston Herald American wrote, "By its warm, personal and probing nature, Woman to Woman does much to reaffirm the existence of an international sisterhood of women."

- Banana (Macmillan, 1976, ISBN 0-595-14229-X)

Bluh's first novel, Banana, was well received and was reissued in 2000 by iUniverse under the auspices of the Authors Guild. The novel relates the story of Joanna, a woman who could have done anything, but married Jay, became a homemaker, and in her mid-forties realized she wanted something more. A critic for Publishers Weekly wrote, "You bleed for Joanna, but most of all you believe in her. This is a novel with a raised consciousness, a mature, intelligent novel of real talent and excitement Doubting Thomases have claimed the feminist movement has yet to produce. Bonnie Bluh, herself an actress-playwright-singer-dancer, has done it." Lynda Schor added in Ms. Magazine that "What makes Banana exceptional and fascinating is its inventiveness, its verve, originality, its sometimes sheer madness, its rage. Preposterousness and eccentricity woven into the mundane. The result is as colorful and variegated as a Peruvian scarf... the most scintillating dialogue I've come across in a long time." In her review in the San Francisco Chronicle Elizabeth Pomada added that the novel's "high velocity monologue is raucous, dirty-truthful, and chortlingly funny." Budicki for the Voice News wrote, "A 'torrent of consciousness' sweeping before it all the modern jargon and confused issues of today... includes a cast of sixteen people. This reviewer groaned when she saw them listed on the jacket, but couldn't lay the book down after starting, having practically to prop her eyes open with fingers, to finish reading at three a.m."

- The Old Speak Out
- Eleanor Roosevelt Girls
