= Paul L. Montgomery =

Paul Lauren Montgomery (May 25, 1936 – October 16, 2008) was a longtime reporter for The New York Times who wrote about local and international affairs for the newspaper.

== Biography ==
Montgomery was an only child, born on May 25, 1936, in Brooklyn and raised in Spring Valley, New York. He attended Columbia University, graduating from the school in 1958.

He spent two years as a textbook editor before being hired by The New York Times in 1959. His first position with the newspaper was as a copy boy. In the early 1960s, Montgomery covered the rioting in Harlem and the civil rights movement in the Southern United States, including the Selma to Montgomery marches.

He was the Times' bureau chief in Rio de Janeiro from 1966 to 1969, where he traveled extensively across Latin America. Article subjects from this period included his 1967 journeys with soldiers from the Bolivian Army on their search for Che Guevara. He also wrote stories about the difficulties of life in the slums of Ecuador and coverage of clashes between federal soldiers and protesters in the Tlatelolco Massacre that took place on October 2, 1968, in Mexico City, ten days before the 1968 Summer Olympics and left an estimated 200 to 300 deaths.

A series of article he wrote in March 1970 resulted in the release of four visitors from Cuenca, Ecuador who had been charged with setting off a simultaneous detonation of incendiary devices in the Alexander's and Bloomingdale's department stores in New York City. The dismissal of charges against the group came after the New York City Police Department was able to corroborate elements of the group's story that had first been published in an article in the Times by Montgomery.

He left the Times in 1982, and wrote from Europe for The Wall Street Journal.
