= Rudolf Pangsepp =

Estonian artist and illustrator

Rudolf Pangsepp (September 18, 1921 – October 12, 2008) was an Estonian artist and book designer.

He was born in Tartu. During WW II, he was conscripted to Red Army. In 1951 he graduated from Tartu State Art Institute.
