= DeWayne McKinney =

- Born: c. 1966
- Died: October 7, 2008 (aged 42); Honolulu, Hawaii, U.S.
- Occupation: Entrepreneur
- Known for: Being wrongfully convicted and imprisoned for homicide

DeWayne McKinney (c. 1966 – October 7, 2008) was an ATM entrepreneur and wrongfully convicted and imprisoned American man.

== Murder trial ==
McKinney was found guilty of the 1980 Orange County, California, killing of Burger King manager Walter Horace Bell Jr. After four employees identified him in court as the gunman, he was sent to prison in 1981.

=== Exoneration ===
McKinney was released in January 2000 when new evidence was revealed that exonerated him. Two other men admitted their guilt for the crime and two of the eyewitnesses that identified him as the gunman recanted their testimonies.

Leaving prison after more than 19 years, he received a $1,000,000 settlement from his wrongful conviction lawsuit.

== Business career ==
He invested his money in becoming an ATM owner in the Los Angeles area. While visiting Hawaii on vacation, he noticed a need in the market for more ATMs to serve the tourism industry and used his compensation payment as start up capital for his successful business.

== Death ==
He died October 7, 2008, at the age of 42, in a motor vehicle accident in Honolulu, Hawaii.

== See also ==
- List of wrongful convictions in the United States
