= Leo Rosner =

Australian musician and Holocaust survivor

- Born: 26 June 1918; Kraków, Poland
- Died: 10 October 2008 (aged 90); Melbourne, Australia
- Resting place: Melbourne Chevra Kadisha Springvale Cemetery
- Occupation: Musician
- Spouse: Helen Rosner (m. 1943)
- Children: 2, including Anna Rosner Blay

Leopold Rosner (26 June 1918 – 10 October 2008) was a Polish-born Australian musician. Rosner, who was Jewish, survived the Holocaust in Nazi concentration camps during World War II by playing his accordion for Nazi officials. This earned the attention of Oskar Schindler, who saved his life by having him placed on his famous list. His story became known after Australian author Thomas Keneally's 1982 novel, Schindler's Ark, was adapted into Steven Spielberg's Oscar-winning film, Schindler's List. He appeared in the epilogue of the film at the Schindler's grave on Mount Zion.

== Life ==
=== Early life ===
Rosner was born in Kraków, Poland on 26 June 1918. He was one of nine children in a family that performed in the music business.

=== The Holocaust ===
Rosner was a successful cabaret artist and entertainer in Kraków, Poland by the time the country was invaded and occupied by Nazi Germany in 1939. The Rosner family fled to the rural town of Tyniece, where they played in barns for food. They were soon caught and sent to the Kraków Ghetto, where they lived in cramped and dangerous conditions. Leo continued to play music with his brother, Henry Rosner. Leo played the accordion, and Henry played the violin. They played at the ghetto's cafes, where he met his wife, Helen (born 1924). They were married on 17 January 1943, but on his wedding night Leo was deported to Płaszów concentration camp without her. Helen and her sister, Janka, were deported to the Płaszów that March.

While at Płaszów, Rosner, along with his brother Henry, were forced to perform for the notorious camp commandant Amon Göth.

Rosner's talent with his accordion earned him the attention of Oskar Schindler. Schindler had Rosner and his surviving family members moved to his camp in Brněnec, Czech Protectorate, in 1945. However, Rosner's wife, Helen, along with the other female Schindlerjuden, including Henry's wife Manci, were transferred to the notorious Auschwitz concentration camp. After a harrowing few weeks, Schindler was able to bribe camp officials to have them transferred out. The couple was reunited at Schindler's camp, the Brünnlitz labor camp, where they remained in relative safety until the end of World War II, when the camp was liberated by the Red Army.

=== Post World War II ===
Leo and Helen Rosner immigrated to Australia in 1949 and settled in Melbourne. The couple had two daughters, Frances Rosner and Anna Rosner Blay. He worked as a musician and eventually fronted a twelve-piece band. He continued to perform into his eighties. He was well known in the Melbourne musician business as well as in the Australian Holocaust survivors community.

He traveled to Mount Zion in Jerusalem for the 1993 film Schindler's List to appear in the film's epilogue with other Schindlerjuden paying their respects at the grave of Oskar Schindler.

Rosner suffered from Alzheimer's disease in his later years, but was still able to perform at his and Helen's 65th wedding anniversary celebration in 2008.

=== Death ===
Leo Rosner died on 10 October 2008, at the age of 90, of complications from Alzheimer's disease in Melbourne, Australia. He was survived by his wife, Helen Rosner, who was 84 years old at the time of Leo's death. Rosner was also survived by his two daughters, six grandchildren and six great-grandchildren. His funeral was held at Melbourne Chevra Kadisha Cemetery in Springvale, Victoria.

His wife, Helen Rosner, died in 2010 after suffering from heart problems and Parkinson's disease, at age 86.
