= Kataejar Jibas =

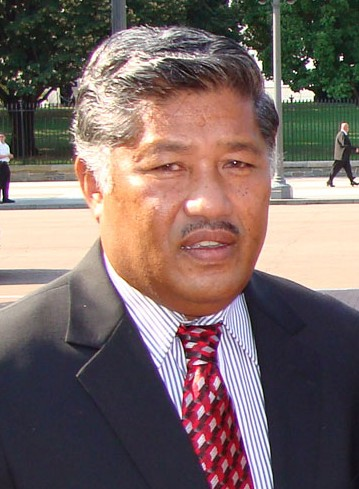
- Kataejar Jibas in Washington D.C. in August 2008.

Mayor of Bikini Atoll
- In office November 2007 – October 2008

Personal details
- Born: October 28, 1952
- Died: October 2, 2008 (aged 55)

Kataejar Jibas (October 28, 1952 – October 2, 2008) was a Marshallese-Bikinian politician who served as the Mayor of Bikini Atoll from November 2007 until 2008.

Jibas had a long involvement with the Kili-Bikini Atoll-Ejit Local Government Council. He worked as a Marshallese policeman during the 1970s. He then became a Councilman and Assistant Treasurer starting in the early 1980s. He remained as a councilman and treasurer until his election as Mayor of Bikini Atoll in November 2007. Jibas remained Mayor until his death in October 2008.

Jibas sustained serious injuries in a car accident which occurred in Majuro, Marshall Islands, on September 17, 2008. He was airlifted to the Philippines for emergency medical treatment.

Jibas died from his injuries at approximately 3:30 pm local time on October 2, 2008, the Philippines at the age of 55. He was survived by his wife, Dorothy, their nine children and several grandchildren.

Jibas' body was flown back to the Marshall Islands, where a memorial service was held at Rita Protestant Church on October 10, 2008. A funeral procession of more than 150 cars and automobiles accompanied Jibas' body for the four mile drive from the airport to Rita Protestant Church. Speakers at high funeral included Marshallese Senator Senator Michael Kabua, Senator Tomaki Juda and Minister to the President of the Marshall Islands

Jibas was buried near his home in Rita Village, Majuro Atoll.
