= Giannis Koskiniatis =

Greek footballer

Personal information
- Full name: Ioannis Koskiniatis
- Date of birth: 29 August 1983
- Place of birth: Rhodes, Greece
- Date of death: 29 October 2008 (aged 25)
- Place of death: Koskinou, Rhodos, Greece
- Position: Midfielder

Senior career*
Years	Team	Apps	(Gls)
–2008	Diagoras	61	(4)
- * Club domestic league appearances and goals

Giannis Koskiniatis (29 August 1983 – 29 October 2008) was a Greek footballer who played for Diagoras F.C. He played 61 games and scored 4 goals for the team.

== Career ==
Koskiniatis made 61 Gamma Ethniki appearances for Diagoras, scoring four goals and helping the club win promotion to the Beta Ethniki for the 2008–09 season. However, he did not play the following season due to a leg injury was dropped for a game against Olympiakos after he returned from injury. Koskiniatis went missing around midday, he drove his motorbike to the top of a cliff. He left a suicide note at the top of the cliff. The readings of the note have been kept private within his family circle. Koskiniatis then jumped off the cliff and committed suicide. Diagoras lost the game 3:2.

It is reported that the team had sent him for psychological help.
