= Germán Abad Valenzuela =

Ecuadorian radiologist

- Born: August 10, 1919; Guayaquil, Ecuador
- Died: October 16, 2008 (aged 89); Guayaquil, Ecuador
- Occupation: Radiologist

Germán Abad Valenzuela (August 10, 1919 – October 16, 2008) was an Ecuadorian radiologist. He served as the doctor to 20 Ecuadorian presidents including Mariano Suárez Veintimilla

Abad was born August 10, 1919, in Guayaquil to Juana Valenzuela Garaycoa and Navy officer Benigno Abad Lara. He attended in Quito to San José LaSalle's primary school. In high school, he was an excellent student and athlete, he attended Guayaquil's Vicente Rocafuerte School and later he graduated from Cristóbal Colón's School. He graduated from the University of Guayaquil in 1948. While studying, he received important prizes from the Medical School Association (Asociación Escuela Medicina) and the Guayas Philanthropical Society (Sociedad Filantrópica del Guayas).

He worked in Luis Vernaza Hospital, León Becerra Hospital, and Alejandro Mann Hospital. He played an important role in the installation of radiological facilities in the Social Security Clinic and Lorenzo Ponce Hospital.

He founded the Guayaquil Posorja Yola Regatta as a medical student in 1940. This rowing race is considered the longest competition in the world with an extension of 49 nautic miles. In 2020, the principal park of Posorja received his name.

He received awards including the Orden Nacional Al Mérito in the Comendador grade. He was married to Lidia Rodríguez Falconi (+ 2018), with whom he had five children, Germán, Sylvia (+ 2020), Juan José (+ 2019), Francesca and Víctor Alfonso (which is whom continues his work as a radiologist, MD).
