= Fuentes de Nava =

Coordinates: 42°05′N 4°47′W

- municipality
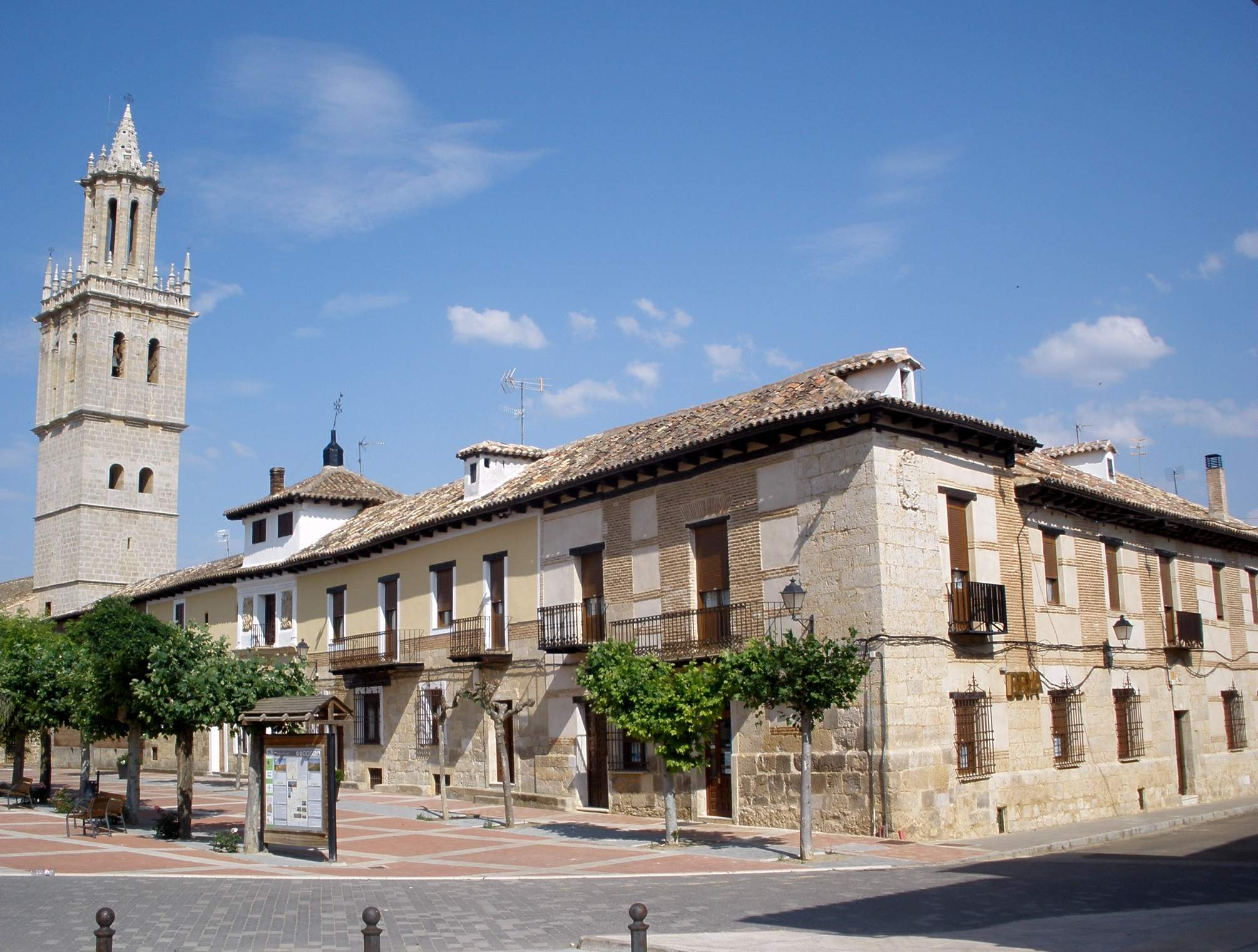

- Flag Coat of arms
- Interactive map of Fuentes de Nava
- Country: Spain
- Autonomous community: Castile and León
- Province: Palencia
- Municipality: Fuentes de Nava

Area
  - Total: 60 km^{2} (23 sq mi)

Population (2025-01-01)
  - Total: 581
  - Density: 9.7/km^{2} (25/sq mi)
- Time zone: UTC+1 (CET)
  - Summer (DST): UTC+2 (CEST)
- Website: Official website

Fuentes de Nava is a municipality located in the province of Palencia, Castile and León, Spain. According to the 2004 census (INE), the municipality has a population of 774 inhabitants.
