= Olga Kaljakin =

American artist

- Born: November 8, 1950
- Died: October 6, 2008 (aged 57)
- Occupations: Art director, Graphic designer, Film poster artist

Olga Kaljakin (November 8, 1950 – October 6, 2008) was an American art director, graphic designer and film poster artist.

== Biography ==
Kaljakin began her career in advertising by joining Petersen Publishing. She later became an art director and graphic designer for Seiniger Advertising, Aspect Ratio and Crew Creative. During her career, Kaljakin received numerous awards and honors for her work, much of which focused on motion picture advertising via film posters, billboards and newspaper ads. Her awards include Hollywood Reporter Key Art Awards and Art Directors Club of LA certificates.

Kaljakin designed film posters and advertising over the course of twenty-five years. She designed the posters for The Last Samurai, Field of Dreams, Moonstruck, The Untouchables, and numerous other films. The bulk of her film advertising work fell within the timeframe of 1985–1997.

Kaljakin died of emphysema on October 6, 2008, at the age of 57. Her memorial service and burial was held at Hollywood Forever Cemetery. Kaljakin was survived by her children, Tania Kaljakin Hernandez and Alexander Aquino Kaljakin, her sister, Tania Kaljakin Rizzo and her mother, Maria Kaljakin. Her archives are held at the Motion Picture Academy.
