= Judith Wachs =

American singer (1938–2008)

Judith Wachs (February 24, 1938 – October 9, 2008) was an American musician and singer who promoted Sephardic music through her musical group, Voice of the Turtle, of which she was the artistic director.

== Early life ==
Wachs was born in New York City and raised in Brooklyn and Queens. She attended Queens College (part of the City University of New York), and played on the school's tennis team. She later attended Columbia University, where she wrote a thesis on women's antiwar poetry for her master's degree in English literature.

She married Stanley Wachs while in her 20s, and moved to Boston in the late 1960s; the two divorced after 16 years. Wachs had always had an interest in music, but her serious passion for the field started after her husband had signed up for recorder lessons but could not participate and Wachs took his place to avoid wasting the money that had been laid out for the course.

== Music career ==
It was through happenstance that Wachs first discovered Sephardic music in the late 1970s, when she heard the Sephardic folk song "Skalerika de Oro", and realized that this was part of a tradition of Jewish music that she had never heard before, despite the fact that she had spent her whole life listening to Jewish music from around the world. Wachs told The Boston Globe in the 1990s that "It was entirely Spanish, unlike anything I had ever heard, and yet it was unmistakably Jewish and totally reminiscent of everything I had ever heard". The centuries-old tunes of the Jews of Spain became her focus for the subsequent three decades, as she sought to share her love of Sephardi music with people worldwide through the Boston-based quartet Voice of the Turtle that she founded in 1978 (together with Derek Burrows, Lisle Kulbach, and Jay Rosenberg) and led as its artistic director.

The New York Times reviewed Voice of the Turtle's 1990 release From the Shores of the Golden Horn: Music of the Spanish Jews of Turkey, describing the album's 19 songs as a "fascinating cultural blend" of Arabic, Spanish and (close to) Eastern European music, with a "powerfully expressive repertory will leave no one unmoved."

== Death ==
Wachs died at age 70 on October 9, 2008, of cancer in her home in Cambridge, Massachusetts, having been diagnosed with the disease a year earlier.
