= Colm Farrelly =

Irish music producer and composer

Columb Farrelly (19 December 1952 – 25 October 2008 in Tralee, Ireland) was an Irish music producer and composer who came to prominence during the mid-1980s through his musical partnership with singer Sinéad O'Connor. Farrelly was a native of Dublin.

== Ton Ton Macoute ==
In the summer of 1984, Farrelly met up with O'Connor through an ad she had placed in Hot Press Magazine. The two of them recruited a few other band members and created around her the seminal act for the band Ton Ton Macoute. The band was received positively, while their sound was inspired by Farrelly's interest in witchcraft, mysticism, and world music.

== Death ==
Farelly died on 25 October 2008 following a short illness.
