= Kazuyoshi Miura (businessman) =

Japanese businessman (1947–2008)

- Born: July 27, 1947; Yamanashi Prefecture, Occupation of Japan
- Died: October 10, 2008 (aged 61); Parker Center, Los Angeles, California, U.S.
- Cause of death: Suicide by hanging
- Occupation: Trading merchant
- Spouse: Kazumi Miura (1979–1981)
- Motive: Insurance fraud
- Criminal charges: Assault, homicide and shoplifting in Japan, conspiracy in the U.S.
- Penalty: 6 years imprisonment for assault, not guilty for homicide

Kazuyoshi Miura (Japanese: 三浦 和義, Hepburn: Miura Kazuyoshi; July 27, 1947 – October 10, 2008) was a Japanese businessman who was accused of being involved in the killing of his wife, Kazumi Miura. The prolonged legal battle, lasting decades, ended with his death, ruled a suicide, in October 2008.

== Early life ==
Miura was born in Yamanashi Prefecture in 1947. After dropping out of a high school in Yokohama, he was arrested for arson and served some years in a juvenile prison. He was suspected of the 1979 killing of his former lover Chizuko Shiraishi.

== Attack on Kazumi Miura ==
Miura, a clothing importer who often traveled to the United States, was suspected of conspiring to kill his wife, Kazumi Miura (三浦 一美, Miura Kazumi) on November 18, 1981, while visiting Los Angeles. On that day, an unknown assailant shot Miura in the right leg and his wife in the head while the two were in a parking lot. After the shooting, Kazumi Miura remained in a coma. She was flown back to Japan by a U.S. Air Force hospital jet. She was blind, paralyzed, unconscious and subsisting on life-support machinery. She died almost a year to the day after the shooting. Kazumi Miura was the mother of a 13-month-old child.

Miura said that street robbers killed his wife, and while in the hospital, campaigned against violence in Los Angeles. Miura said that he wrote letters to President Ronald Reagan and California Governor Jerry Brown and asked the two to secure Los Angeles. The incident reinforced Japanese stereotypes about U.S. violence.

== Arrest and trial in Japan ==
In 1984, the Japanese magazine Shūkan Bunshun published articles which indicated Miura had been involved in the killing of his wife. The articles revealed that he took out a life insurance policy on his wife worth the equivalent of US$1.4 million. In addition, an actress, who said she was Miura's lover, said that Miura asked her to kill his wife. Daryl Gates, the chief of the Los Angeles Police Department during the Miura incident, said that the department and Japanese police suspected Miura had arranged to have his wife killed. However, the shooter never was found, and there was no physical evidence linking Miura to the murder.

According to then Los Angeles District Attorney Ira Reiner, LAPD homicide detectives did not believe that Miura was the perpetrator, but rather that the events had been a "vicious...street crime". However one officer, Jimmy Sakoda, head of the Asian Crimes Squad, did not share the homicide detectives' conclusions. He took his concerns to Reiner who then began working with Japanese prosecutors. Reiner has stated that were it not for Sakoda's persistence the case might have been relegated to the unsolved, or cold case files.

Miura was convicted of the murder and was sentenced to life imprisonment in Japan in 1994, upon which he promptly appealed to Tokyo High Court. After four years of deliberation, Tokyo High Court overturned the conviction and the resulting sentence, because they were not able to identify the assailant and thus could not prove conspiracy. In 2003, the Japanese Supreme Court also acquitted him of the charge, saying "high court's judgment that there is reasonable doubt that he conspired with an unidentified person to kill his late wife is reasonable."

== Arrest by the U.S. authorities and death ==
California authorities learned that Miura frequently visited U.S. territory on business, and waited until he made a trip to the island of Saipan in the U.S. Northern Mariana Islands, where he was arrested on February 22, 2008. In Saipan, he began fighting extradition to California, and hired lawyers both on Saipan and in Los Angeles. A former federal prosecutor noted that the 27 years since the crime could help Miura's defense. "Witness memories don't get better with time," she said in an interview with the International Herald Tribune. Los Angeles prosecutors announced that they identified the actual sniper, but there was no move by the prosecutors to arrest the deadly sniper.

The legal battle to avoid getting extradited to California continued until late September when the Los Angeles Superior Court dropped the murder charges, due to prohibition of double jeopardy, but found conspiracy charges, which do not have capital punishment, valid. Miura gave up his fight against extradition and was transported to Los Angeles, California, arriving in the early morning of October 10, 2008, That night, according to an announcement by the police, he committed suicide by hanging himself in his cell. Although an independent pathologist hired by the defense attorney stated the evidence showed Miura was murdered while in jail, the Los Angeles County coroner ruled that the cause of death was suicide.
