= Daniel Aguillón =

Mexican boxer (1984–2008)

Personal information
- Nickname: Cuautitlan
- Nationality: (Mexico) Mexican
- Born: Daniel Aguillón Ramírez; August 11, 1984 Mexico City, Mexico
- Died: October 18, 2008 (aged 24)
- Height: 5 ft 10 in (180 cm)
- Weight: Super Featherweight

Boxing career
- Reach: 74 in (189 cm)
- Stance: Orthodox

Boxing record
- Total fights: 20
- Wins: 15
- Win by KO: 9
- Losses: 3
- Draws: 2
- No contests: 0

Daniel Aguillón Ramírez (August 11, 1984 – October 18, 2008) was a Mexican featherweight boxer. He died in a Mexico City hospital after a five-day coma induced by a knockout punch by fellow Mexican boxer Alejandro Sanabria during an official fight held on October 15, 2008, in Polanco, Mexico. He was 24.

== Death ==
Aguillón (16–4–2, 9 KOs) was punched in the jaw in the last minute of the 12th round of the super featherweight bout for the Central American title, sanctioned by the World Boxing Council (WBC) by his opponent Sanabria, he fell unconscious on the floor and was taken to a hospital, but never recovered. The WBC announced it will provide financial support for the family.
