= Shaharom Husain =

Malaysian historian

Shaharom Husain (4 November 1919 – 2 October 2008) was a Malaysian historian. Husain, a PhD, had published a number of books on the history of Johor. He had won a number of awards for cultural development, including the Tokoh Guru (exemplary teacher) at the Johor. Additionally, Husain authored several literary works, including a theatre play, a memoir, poems, novels and short stories.

He had appeared as an entry in the Dictionary of International Biography, which documents 2,000 individuals worldwide who are involved in writing and education.

Husain was born in Kampung Peserai, Mukim Tiga in Batu Pahat, Johor, on 4 November 1919. He died in his sleep around 7.45 A.M. on 2 October 2008, at the home of his eldest son, Mohammed Hatta, in Gombak, Selangor at the age of 95. He was buried at the Mahmoodiah Muslim Cemetery next to his wife, Aminah Abdul Rashid
