= Mireille Marokvia =

French writer (1908–2008)

Mireille Marokvia (1908 – 19 October 2008) was a French writer best known for her two books about her ordeals during World War II in Nazi Germany.

== Biography ==
She was born in a village near Chartres, France, in December 1908. Her first English publication was a children's book released in 1959.

She died on 19 October 2008 in Las Cruces in the United States at the age of 99.
