= Tony Dean (conservationist) =

American conservationist

Tony Dean (November 26, 1940 – October 19, 2008) was an American outdoors broadcaster, columnist and conservationist. Dean's (nickname Deeno) real name was Anthony DeChandt.

Starting in 1985, Dean had hosted and produced the television show Tony Dean Outdoors, broadcast regionally in the upper Midwestern United States. He recorded several episodes of the show together co-hosted with Jason Mitchell for Tony Dean Outdoors prior to Mitchell's purchase of the program, now known as Jason Mitchell Outdoors. Dean also produced the daily radio show "Dakota Backroads" for nearly two decades and wrote columns for the Argus Leader, the daily newspaper of Sioux Falls, South Dakota.

His programs received more than 160 regional and national awards. Dean served as a press secretary for former Governor of South Dakota, Republican Frank Farrar.

Dean supported candidates based on their stance on the issue of conservation, and he was criticized for his support of Democratic senator Tim Johnson and later for his support of the presidential campaign of Barack Obama, who Dean felt had the insight to appreciate the issues of land conservation. His wife indicated that one of the last things Dean had done before his attack of appendicitis was to film a series of commercials for Obama's campaign. She further noted that Dean would have served on the transition team in the event of an Obama victory.

Dean died on October 19, 2008, after complications from an appendicectomy. He had had his appendix removed in an operation in September 2008 in Pierre, South Dakota, and was moved to a hospital in Sioux Falls, South Dakota, to address complications. He died in the living room of his home overlooking the Missouri River, together with members of his immediate family.

Senator Johnson eulogized Dean for "his advocacy on behalf of conservation and sportsmen alike", noting that "[h]e understood the right balance".
