= Scarlett (cat) =

New York stray cat (1995– 2008)

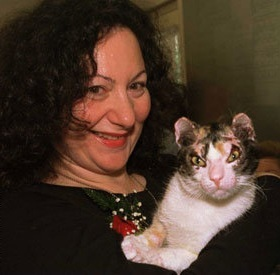
- Scarlett and her adoptive owner in June 1996
- Species: Felis catus
- Sex: Female
- Born: c. June 1995; Brooklyn, New York
- Died: October 11, 2008 (aged 13); Brooklyn, New York
- Nationality: America
- Known for: Rescuing her kittens from a fire
- Owner: Karen Wellen
- Parent: Unknown sire and dam
- Offspring: Tanuki, Samsara, Oreo (North Shore), Cinders (Smoky), and 1 more (deceased)

Scarlett (June or July 1995 – October 11, 2008) was a former stray cat from Brooklyn, New York, whose efforts to save her kittens from a fire attracted worldwide media attention, and has been described in a number of non-fiction books. If the kittens were her first litter, Scarlett was probably about nine months old.

She later became a featured animal in the fund-raising and public relations efforts of the shelter that treated her and her kittens, the North Shore Animal League. On October 15, 2008, the League announced that Scarlett had died.

== Fire ==
On March 30, 1996, Scarlett and her five kittens were in an abandoned garage allegedly used as a crack house in Brooklyn when a fire started from undetermined causes, though individuals using crack have been presumed to be responsible. The New York City Fire Department responded to a call about the fire and quickly extinguished it. When the fire was under control, one of the firefighters on the scene, David Giannelli, noticed Scarlett carrying her kittens away from the garage one by one.

Scarlett herself had been severely burned in the process of pulling her kittens from the fire. Her eyes were blistered shut, her ears and paws burned, and her coat highly singed. The majority of her facial hair had been burnt away. After saving the kittens she was seen to touch each of her kittens with her nose to ensure they were all there, as the blisters on her eyes kept her from being able to see them, and then she collapsed unconscious.

== Recovery ==
Giannelli took the intact family to a veterinary clinic at the North Shore Animal League in Port Washington, New York where Scarlett and her kittens were treated. The weakest of the kittens, a white-coated, died of a virus a month after the fire. However, after three months of treatment and recovery, Scarlett and her surviving kittens were well enough to be adopted.

== International media ==
The story of this feline mother's efforts and bravery to save her kittens attracted international attention, and the clinic received more than 7,000 letters offering to adopt Scarlett and her kittens. The clinic ultimately chose to divide the kittens into two pairs, and the pairs were given over for adoption to residents of The Hamptons and Port Washington, New York.

Scarlett herself was adopted by Karen Wellen of Brooklyn. In her letter, Wellen indicated that, as a result of losing her cat shortly after being injured in a traffic accident herself, she had become more compassionate and would take in only animals with special needs.

== Death ==
Scarlett died on October 11, 2008, while with her adoptive family in Brooklyn. Scarlett needed continuing care as a result of her injuries. She was diagnosed with a heart murmur during her recovery at the Animal League Veterinary Medical Center. At her death, she was reported to have multiple illnesses.

== Scarlett Award ==
The North Shore Animal League created an award named the Scarlett Award for Animal Heroism, in Scarlett's honor. The award is presented to animals or humans that have engaged in heroic acts to benefit others.

== Books ==
Scarlett's story was mentioned in a Chicken Soup for the Soul book.

== See also ==
- Fred the Undercover Kitty
- List of individual cats
