= Pablo Barrachina Estevan =

- Bishop Orihuela-Alicante Diocese (Emeritus)
- Church: Roman Catholic Church
- See: Orihuela-Alicante Diocese
- In office: 1954–1989
- Predecessor: José García y Goldaraz
- Successor: Francisco Alvarez Martínez
- Previous post(s): Priest

Orders
- Ordination: 13 July 1941

Personal details
- Born: 31 October 1912; Jérica, Spain
- Died: 13 October 2008 (aged 95); Spain

Pablo Barrachina Estevan (31 October 1912 – 13 October 2008) was a Spanish Bishop of the Roman Catholic Church.

Pablo Barrachina Estevan was born in Jérica, Spain. He was ordained a priest on 13 July 1941 of the Sergorbe Diocese. He was appointed bishop of Orihuela-Alicante Diocese on 31 March 1954 and ordained bishop on 29 June 1954. Pablo Barrachina Estevan retired as bishop of Orihuela-Alicante Diocese on 12 May 1989.
