= Dancing egg =

Catalan tradition involving a chicken ovum suspended on a water jet

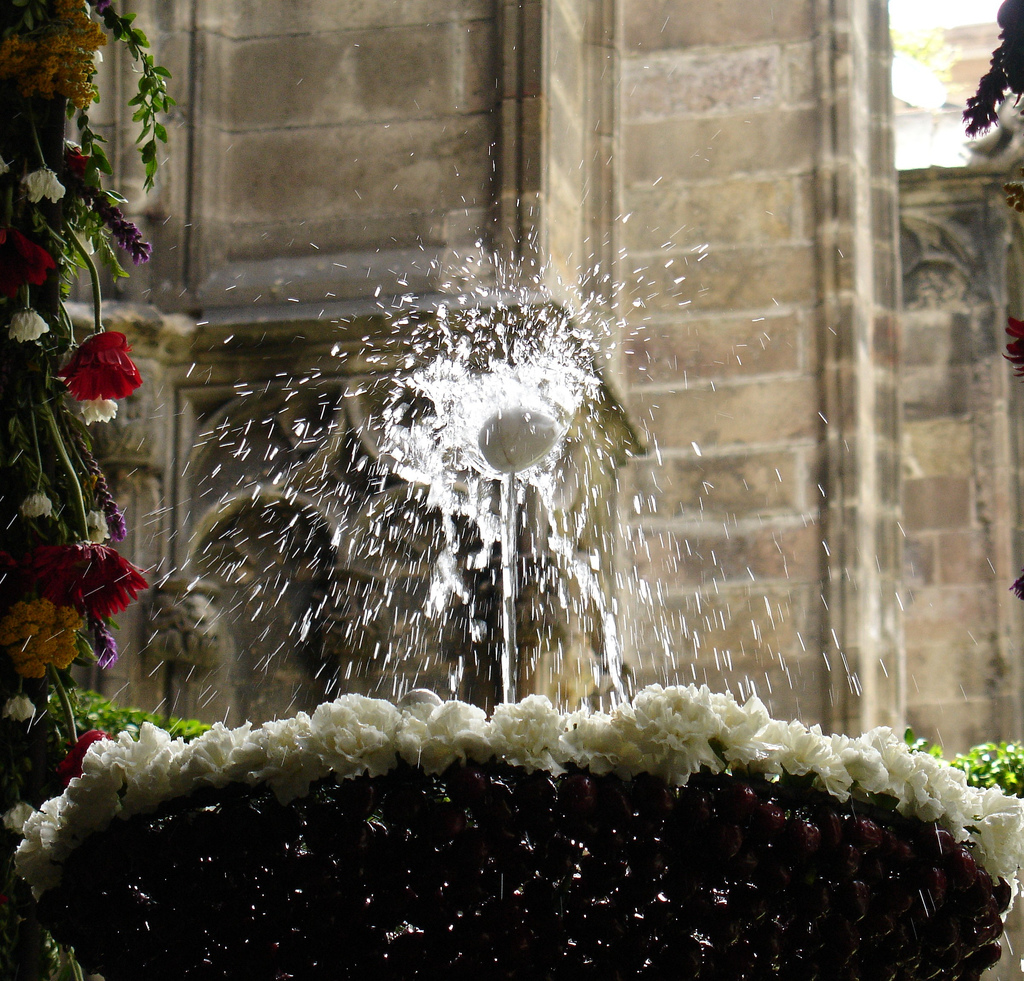
The dancing egg at the cloister of the Barcelona Cathedral

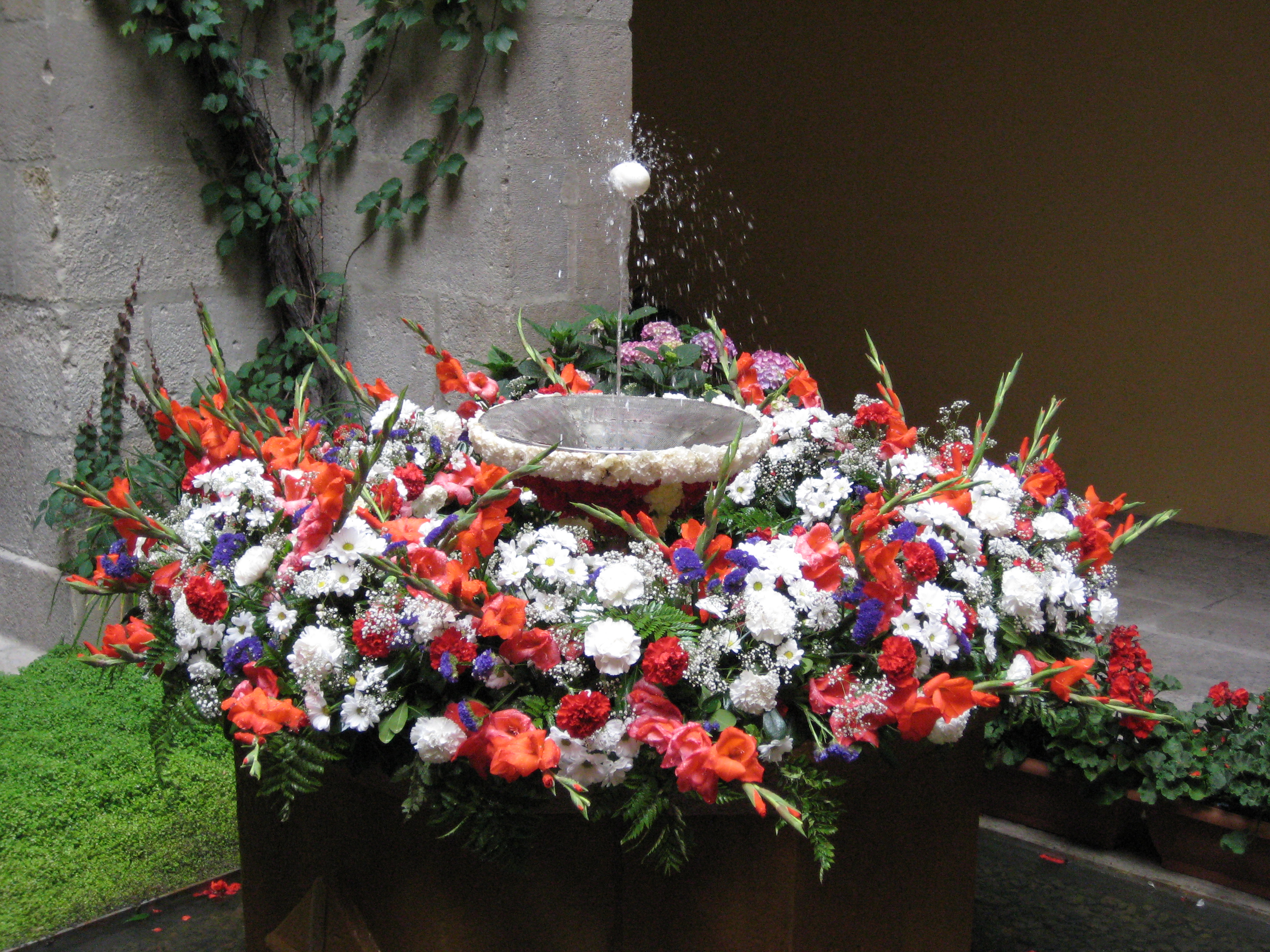
The dancing egg at the Archives of the Crown of Aragon, Barcelona

The dancing egg (l'ou com balla in Catalan) is an old tradition that takes place in several towns in Catalonia, Spain, during the feast of Corpus Christi, when an egg is suspended in the vertical jet of a water fountain. The tradition probably started at the Cathedral of Barcelona.

== History ==
There is evidence from the 16th century that acolytes would place a dancing egg on the fountain of the Barcelona Cathedral's cloister. To accomplish this, the egg would have been emptied, with wax used to fill the hole and add some weight. When placed over a water jet from a fountain, the egg starts turning without falling, and thus "dances." Generally, fountains with a dancing egg are also decorated with seasonal flowers and fresh fruits, like cherries, which cover the bowl of the fountain, as well as weaver's broom and carnations.

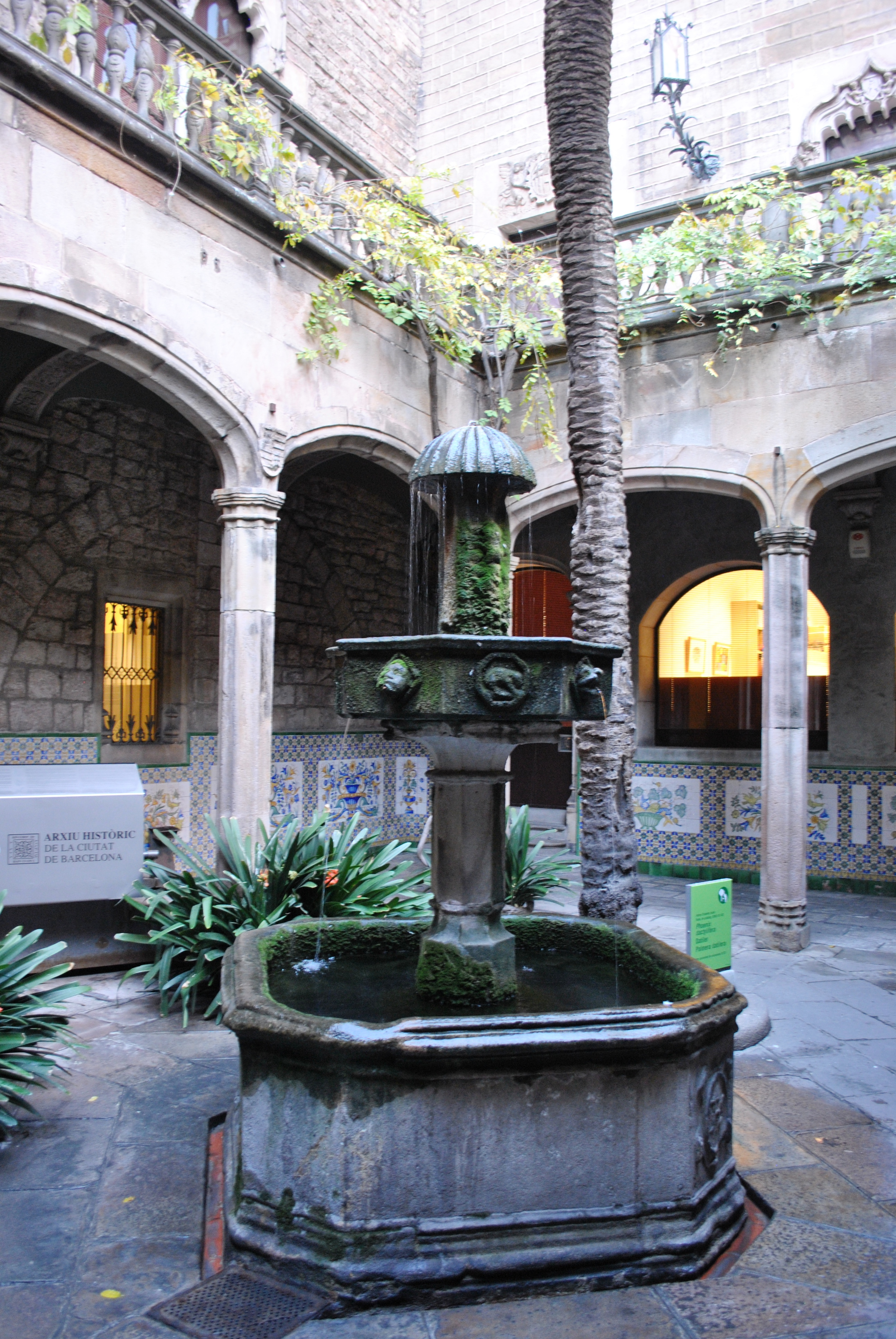
Patio of the Casa de l'Ardiaca

From the Cathedral, the tradition also started at the patio of the neighboring Casa de l'Ardiaca (Archdeacon's House), and it spread to several other courtyards of the Barcelona city center beginning in the 1980s. More recently, other Catalan cities and towns assumed the tradition.

== Modern examples ==
In Barcelona a dancing egg is placed in several locations within the Gothic Quarter during Corpus Christi: Barcelona Cathedral the Casa de l'Ardiaca, in addition to the courtyards of the Ateneu Barcelonès, the General Archive of the Crown of Aragon (at the Palau del Lloctinent), the Royal Academy of Arts of Barcelona, Frederic Marès Museum, the cloister of the Monastery of Jonqueres (adjacent to the Basilica of the Immaculate Conception), Centelles Palace, and the History Museum of Barcelona.

- In Igualada the dancing egg is placed on Pius XII Square.
- In Sitges it is found at the Maricel Museum.
- In Tarragona in 1933, the canon Dr. Josep Vallès Barceló began decorating the garden and placed a dancing egg on the fountain of the cloister of the Tarragona Cathedral. Its popularity grew, especially after the Spanish Civil War, with the assistance of the local officials. At present it is prepared by a team of volunteers, a volunteer florist and the cathedral sacristy.
- In Sant Feliu de Llobregat it is celebrated at the Sant Llorenç Cathedral

== Gallery ==
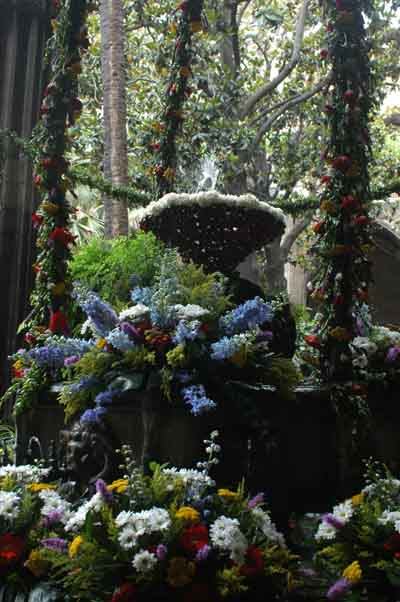
Cathedral of Barcelona

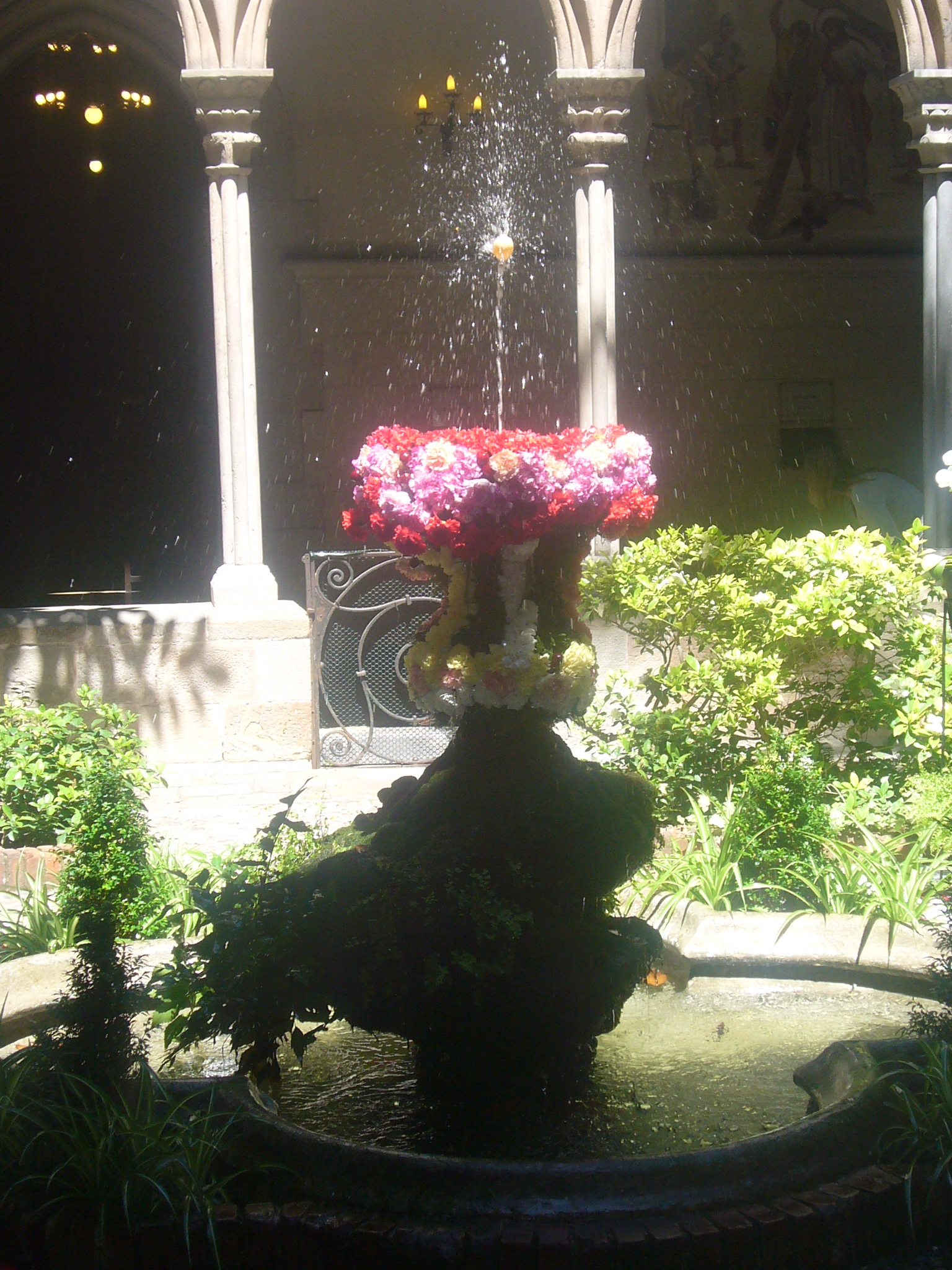
Monastery of Jonqueres (Basilica of the Immaculate Conception)

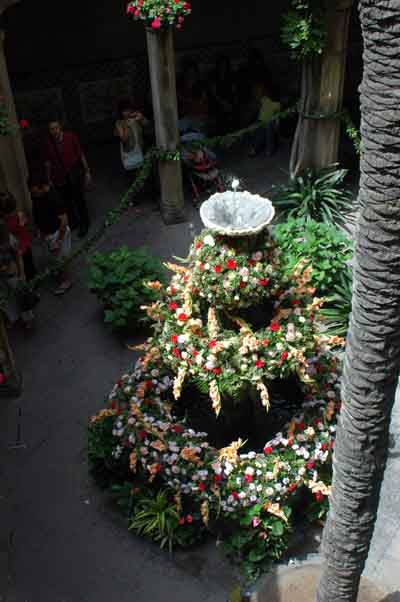
Casa de l'Ardiaca (Archdeacon's House)

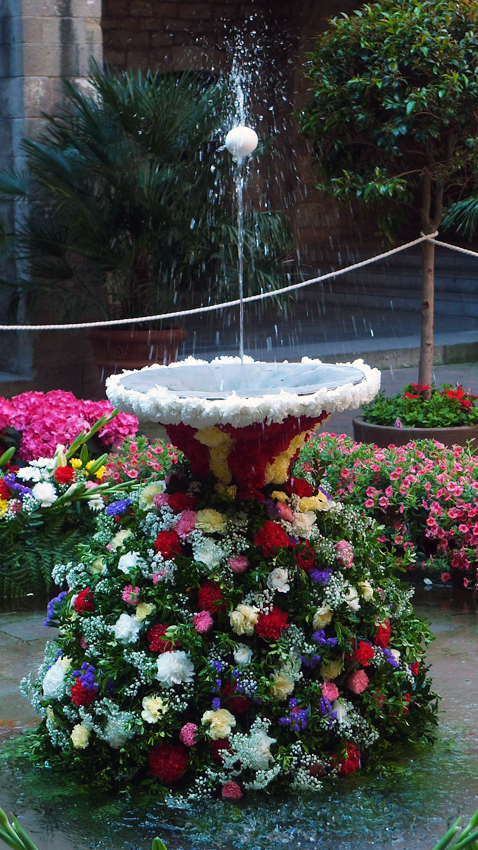
L'ou com balla in the courtyard of the Frederic Marès Museum

== Bibliography ==
- José María de Mena. Plaza&Janes Editores, S.A. Curiosidades y leyendas de Barcelona (in Spanish), 1992, page 91. ISBN 84-01-37393-X
