= Olegarius =

Saint Olegarius
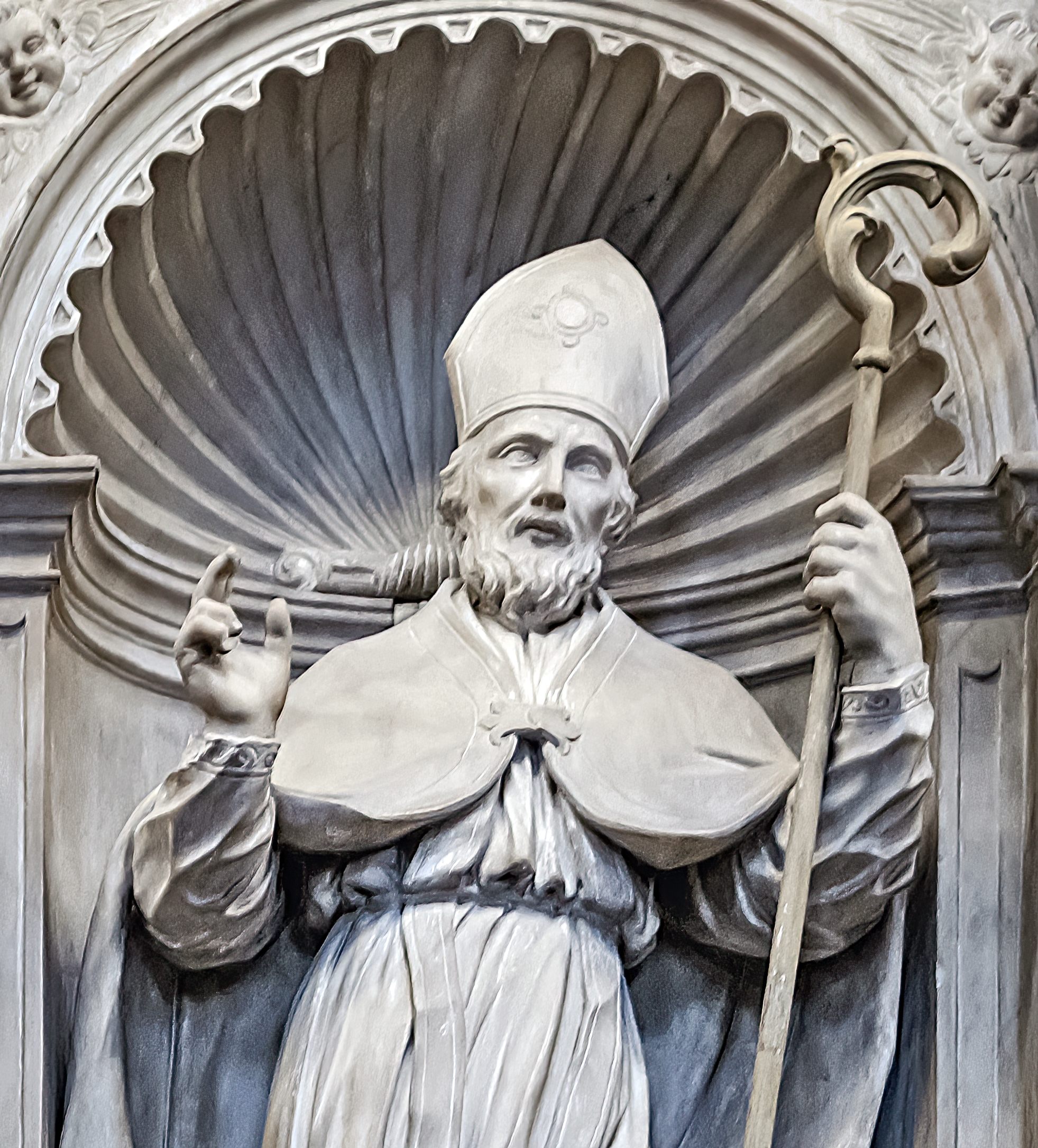
- Born: 1060; Barcelona
- Died: 6 March 1137
- Venerated in: Roman Catholic Church
- Beatified: 25 May 1675, Rome, Papal States by Pope Clement X
- Major shrine: side chapel of Christ of Lepanto, Cathedral of Barcelona
- Feast: 6 March

Olegarius Bonestruga (from Germanic Oldegar, Latin: Ollegarius, Oligarius, Catalan: Oleguer, Spanish: Olegario; 1060 – 6 March 1137) was the Bishop of Barcelona from 1116 and Archbishop of Tarragona from 1118 until his death. He was an intimate of Ramon Berenguer III, Count of Barcelona, and often accompanied the count on military ventures.

Olegarius was canonised in 1675 and his major shrine and sepulchre is in the side chapel of Christ of Lepanto in the cathedral of Barcelona. His feast is celebrated the date of his death: 6 March. An unreliable vita was composed for his canonisation, based on a fourteenth-century Vitae sancti Ollegarii, which is based on a lost twelfth-century vita often ascribed to Olegarius' contemporary of Barcelona, Renald the Grammarian.

== Early ecclesiastical career ==
Olegarius was born to a noble family of Barcelona. His father was a follower of Ramon Berenguer I, Count of Barcelona; his mother was Guilla (or Guilia). At the age of ten, Olegarius entered the guild of canon priests of the Cathedral of Barcelona. He later served as superior (provost) of the canonries of Barcelona and then Sant Adrià de Besós (1095–1108), and later as abbot of the Augustinian monastery of Saint-Ruf (Saint Rufus) in Avignon (1113–1118). As abbot of Saint-Ruf, Olegarius had mediated the Mediterranean alliance between the Republic of Pisa, Kingdom of Cagliari, County of Provence, and Barcelona against the Almoravid pirates based on the Balearic Islands, resulting in the expedition of 1113–15. In the Gesta triumphalla per Pisanos, facta de captione Hierusalem et civitatis Mayoricarum of the Pisan deacon Enric (not, as sometimes alleged, Lorenzo Verones), Olegarius' name is misspelled as Nogelarius or Nigelarius.

At some point he joined the cofradía (confraternity) of San Pedro de la Portella. Raymond Berenguer III named him bishop of Barcelona in 1116, and he was consecrated by Cardinal Boso of Sant'Anastasia in the cathedral of Maguelone in Occitania during the pontificate of Paschal II. In 1117 he went to Rome to pay homage to Pope Gelasius II.

== Ecclesiastical reformer and leader ==
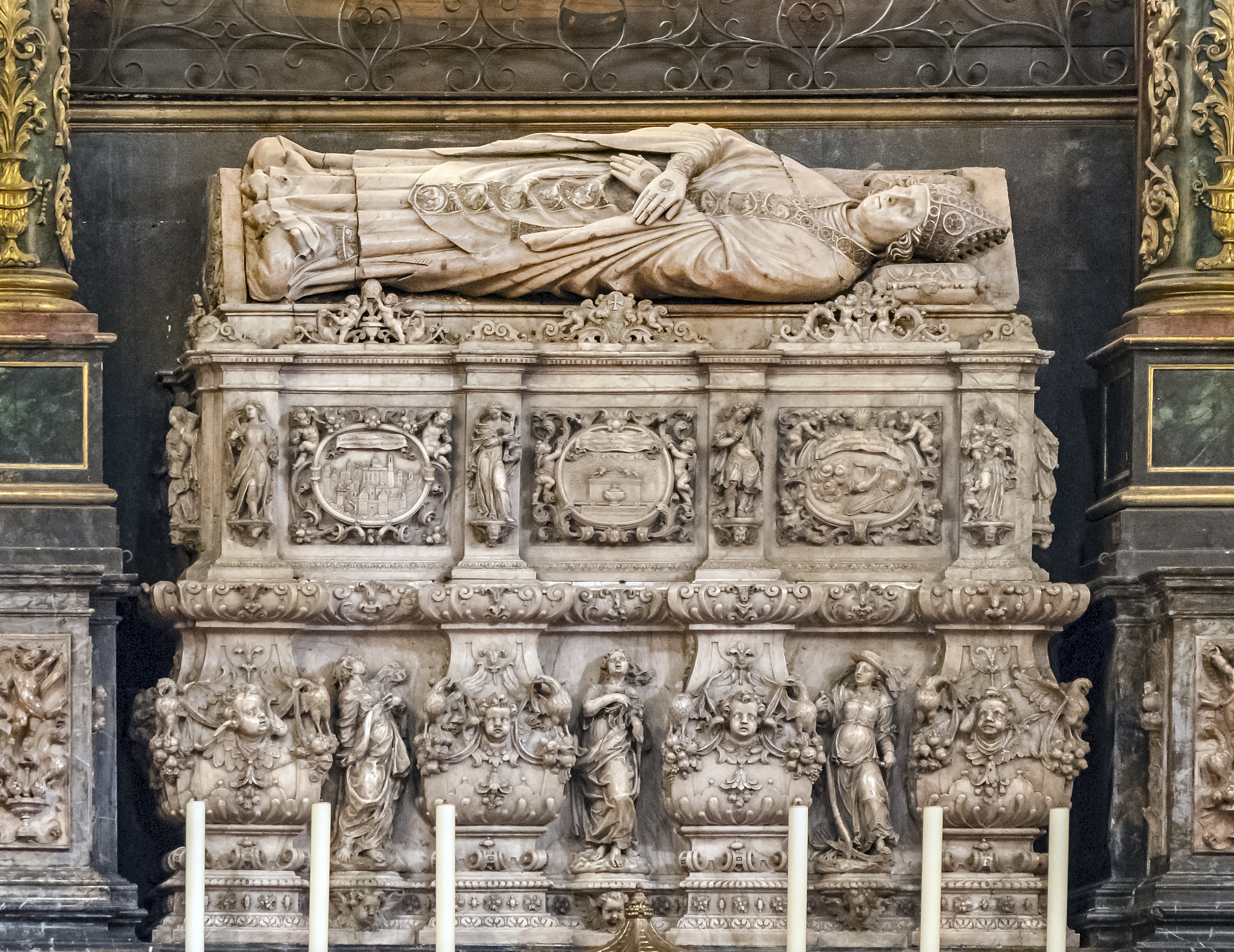
Sepulcher of Saint Olegarius, side chapel of Christ of Lepanto, Cathedral of Barcelona.

As a churchman Olegarius was of the reforming tradition. He was often present at papal synods. He attended Toulouse in 1119, Rheims in 1120, First Lateran in 1123, Narbonne in 1129, Clermont in 1130, and Rheims in 1131. At First Lateran he had been declared legate a latere over the Crusade in New Catalonia (i.e., the province of Tarragone) and began to take the title dispensator or rector of Tarragona. At Narbonne the council confirmed the interprovincial archconfraternity (confratrium) for the restoration of the church of Tarragona which Olegarius had established on a more local level a year earlier. Members of the confraternity, lay and ecclesiastical, noble or otherwise, paid membership dues which went to Olegarius' archdiocese. At Clermont he probably met Bernard of Clairvaux and his arguments were influential in the condemnation of Antipope Anacletus II. He attended the council of San Zoilo in Castile on 4 February 1130.

In the 1120s Olegarius reformed the monastery of Santa Eulàlia outside Barcelona, turning it into a community of Augustinian canons. Indeed, he was extensively involved in the Augustinian reform of the Catalan monasteries. In 1132 he excommunicated the monastery of Santa Maria de Ripoll over the right to exercise justice for crimes committed on the monastery's land. In 1133 Olegarius granted the sheets and beds of all deceased clergy to the hospital of En Guitard in Barcelona.

== Restoration of Tarragona ==
After Tarragona was re-conquered from the Moors, on 8 March 1118 Olegarius was consecrated archbishop of Tarragona (remaining bishop of Barcelona) by Gelasius, who as a monk had lived at Saint-Ruf under Olegarius. He received the bull of confirmation and the pallium on 21 March. He was granted full jurisdiction over Tarragona and its countryside by Ramon Berenguer III—through a process, agreed on 23 January 1118, whereby the secular lordship was granted to the church pending reconquest—and also received ecclesiastical administrative rights over the projected diocese of Tortosa (which had not yet been conquered) from Pope Gelasius. He was a close counsellor to Ramon Berenguer III and Ramon Berenguer IV.

At some point after the Battle of Corbins—a great Catalan defeat—in 1124, Olegarius is said to have gone on a pilgrimage to the Holy Land. He cut his stay short at Antioch because of concern for Tarragona and had returned by 1127.

Between 1126 and 1130 Olegarius was very active in rebuilding Tarragona, its churches especially. He also actively encouraged resettlement and colonisation and laboured to bring in knights and other soldiers for the new territory's defence. He "conferred benefices regularly", according to his vita. In 1126–1127, the period of his greatest activity in New Catalonia, he began encouraging a second Crusade effort. He began by compensating William V of Montpellier for the knights he had lent to Barcelona in 1124–1125 and by reconciling William with his son, Bernard IV of Melgueil, in order to strengthen the anti-Almoravid alliance. On 14 March 1129 he ceded this secular authority in the district of Tarragona to Robert Bordet, with whom he had an antagonistic relationship, with the title of princeps Tarraconensis, effectively the archiepiscopate's vidame or defensor. Instead Olegarius concentrated on restoring the metropolitan.

== Diplomatic activity ==
In 1129 Olegarius was drawn into the Investiture Controversy then raging between Papacy and Empire and he returned to southern France to be with the pope in exile. He was briefly in Barcelona and then in Castile (at San Zoilo) in 1130 before returning to France. He was back in Barcelona for the cort of 1131, whereat Olegarius successfully petitioned for a restoration of the tithe on the revenues from Barcelona's port, which a new treaty he had negotiated with the Republic of Genoa had recently augmented.

Olegarius helped establish the Knights Templar in Catalonia "to serve God and fight in our land" in 1134. In 1122 he was a signatory at Montearagón to the foundation charter of the military confraternity of Belchite, founded by Alfonso the Battler. He played an important role in December 1134 when, at Zaragoza, he brokered a peace between Ramiro II of Aragon and Alfonso VII of Castile. He also negotiated the marriage alliances between Douce I, Countess of Provence and Ramon Berenguer III and of Petronila of Aragon to Ramon Berenguer IV.

== Sources ==
- Bishko, Charles Julian. "The Spanish and Portuguese Reconquest, 1095–1492". A History of the Crusades, vol. 3: The Fourteenth and Fifteenth Centuries. Harry W. Hazard, ed. Madison: University of Wisconsin Press, 1975.
- Bisson, Thomas N. The Medieval Crown of Aragon: A Short History. Oxford: Clarendon Press, 1986. ISBN 0-19-821987-3.
- Brodman, James William. Charity and Welfare: Hospitals and the Poor in Medieval Catalonia. University of Pennsylvania Press, 1998.
- Fletcher, R. A. "Reconquest and Crusade in Spain, c. 1050–1150." Transactions of the Royal Historical Society, 5th Ser., 37 (1987), pp. 31–47.
- Freedman, Paul H. The Diocese of Vic: Tradition and Regeneration in Medieval Catalonia. New Jersey: Rutgers University Press, 1983.
- McCrank, Lawrence J. "The Foundation of the Confraternity of Tarragona by Archbishop Oleguer Bonestruga, 1126–1129." Viator, 9 (1978) pp. 157–168.
