= Ramon Corts i Blay =

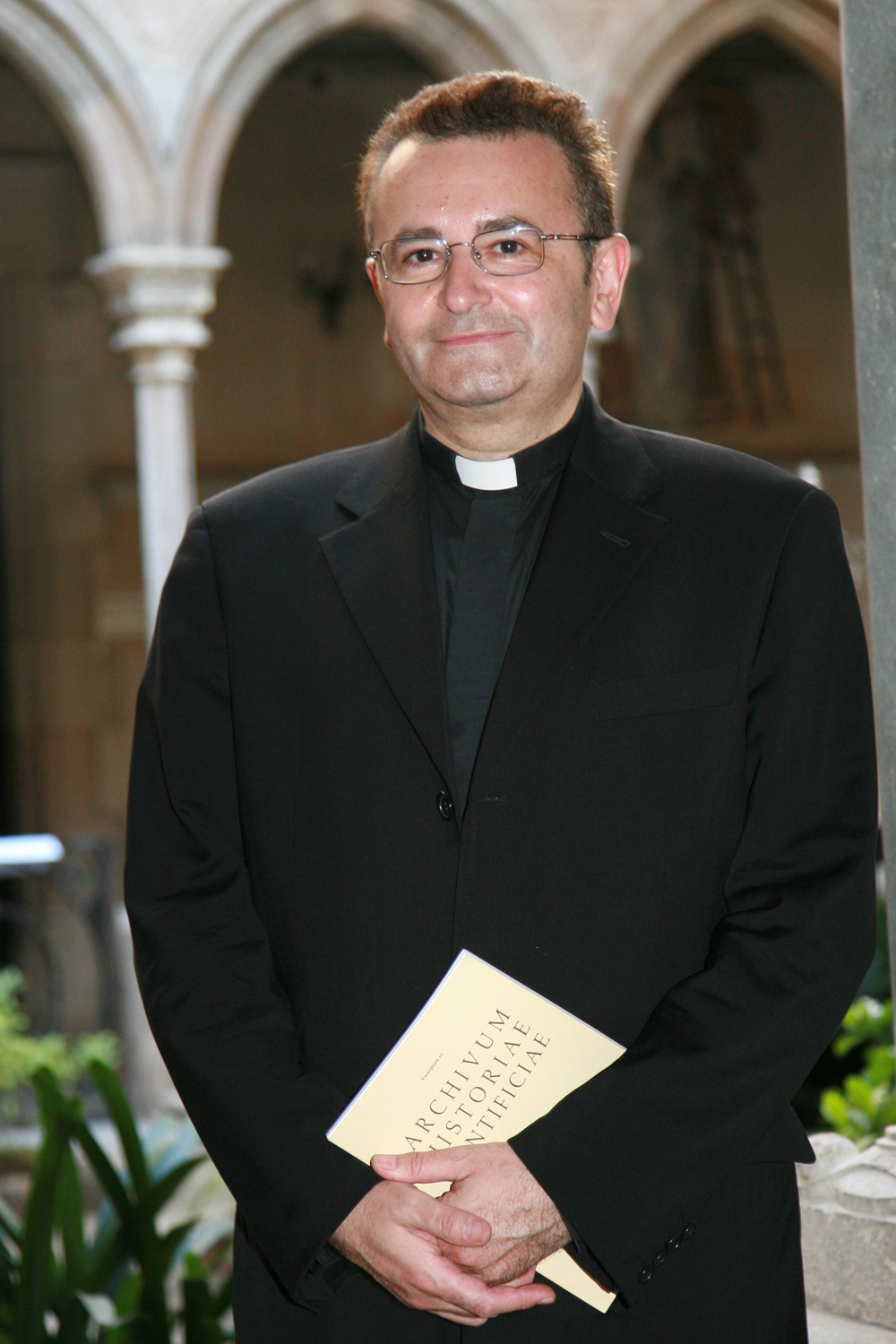
Ramon Corts i Blay

Ramon Corts i Blay (6 August 1951, Mataró) is a historian priest educated at Theological Seminary of Barcelona. He was ordained in 1979 and currently belongs to the Roman Catholic Archdiocese of Barcelona.

Conducts research in the Vatican Secret Archives on relations between the Holy See and Catalonia. He has published five collections of the Vatican Secret Archives documentation as the bottom of the Apostolic Nunciature of Madrid and Secretary of State (1877–1921) and several articles in magazines and broadcasting.

== Biography ==
Ramon Corts i Blay was born on 6 August 1951 in Mataró and has a PhD in Ecclesiastical History (Pontifical Gregorian University). He holds a degree in Philosophy, specialising in Modern History, University of Barcelona (1975) and also has a degree in Theology (1982). He was ordained priest on 24 March 1979, in Barcelona.

=== Studies ===
In 1982 he obtained a degree in Sacred Theology at the Faculty of Theology of Barcelona. He continued his studies at the Pontifical Gregorian University of Rome, Faculty of Ecclesiastical History, residing at the Teutonic College of Santa Maria dell'Anima and the Ecclesiastical Convictorio Santa Maria of Monserrato.

He holds a PhD in church history at the Pontifical Gregorian University (1991). He is also graduated in Archive for the Vatican Secret Archives, 1991.

=== Pastoral, academic and scientific responsibilities ===
He was professor of religion at the School of Teacher Training Education at the University of Barcelona until 1995 and has taught as a visiting professor at the Faculty of Theology, History and Law at Barcelona and at the Antoni Gaudí School.

In 1997 he was appointed rector of the Theological Seminary of Barcelona and since 2006 is Diocesan Delegate for Education of the Roman Catholic Archdiocese of Barcelona. Since 2010 he is the director of Religious Culture and the Editorial Balmes Barcelona. It is also the rector of the Athenaeum Barcelona Universitari Sant Pacià.

He is the director of the Balmes Library of Barcelona and Analecta Sacra Tarraconensia magazine since 1991. He was co-director of the book Diccionari d’història eclesiàstica de Catalunya, under the auspices of the autonomous government of Generalitat de Catalunya. He is patron of Fundació Balmesiana (1991) and rector of the Theological Seminary of Barcelona (1997).

He is the rector of the Basilica of the Immaculate Conception (Barcelona) since 1999. He is also the rector of the parish of St. Francesc de Sales in Barcelona since 2013, which is a parish group with Basilica of the Immaculate Conception.

He is managing director of Education of the Roman Catholic Archdiocese of Barcelona since 2005 and Director of Foment de Pietat / Cultura religiosa. He is the director of the Classrooms of Ecclesiastical History of Catalonia (2010) and head of the Department of History of the Antoni Gaudí Faculty, Archaeology and Christian Art (2014) and President of the Center Studies Association Tarraconensia Historical (2015).

=== Activities ===
- Organiser of the First Congress of Church History in Catalonia, Solsona 1994.
- Director of Diccionari d'Història Eclesiàstica de Catalunya, Barcelona 2000–2002 (3 volums).
- Organiser of Sessió Històrica sobre la Tradició Immaculista in Barcelona celebrated in Saló de Cent of the Town Hall, Barcelona, 24 November 2004.
- Organiser of Jornades sobre la Setmana Tràgica (1909) in Barcelona, 5-6–7 May 2009.
- Organiser of Jornada Balmesiana en commemoració del bicentenari de Jaume Balmes in Barcelona, 3 May 2011.

=== Publications ===
- Collection "Què sabem de la nostra fe?" (Editorial Balmes):
  - 'Què celebrem els cristians el diumenge?'
  - 'Com celebrem els cristians el diumenge?'
  - 'Una bona notícia: Déu ens perdona!'
  - 'Déu ens perdona pel sagrament de la misericòrdia'
  - 'Les obres de misericòrdia' (in Catalan and Spanish)
  - 'Com confessar-se. El sagrament de la misericòrdia'
  - 'Què són les indulgències i els jubileus?'
- Collection "Preguem amb l'Església" (Editorial Balmes):
  - 'Advent, camí de Nadal' (in Catalan and Spanish)
  - 'Els infants preguem a l'estiu'
  - 'Quaresma, camí de la Pasqua'
- "Fèlix Amat de Palou i Pont (1750–1824) i Fèlix Torres Amat (1772–1847): dos bisbes catalans acusats de jansenisme. (Una aportació a la història del jansenisme català)", published in Pedralbes 2, 283–293 (Barcelona 1982).
- "La fàbrica i la Parròquia de Santa Maria de Jesús de Gràcia", a Santa Maria de Jesús de Gràcia (Barcelona 1985), 17–23.
- "El Jansenisme en el pensament de Fèlix Amat (1750–1824), arquebisbe de Palmira", published in Revista Catalana de Teologia XVII/1, 169–186 (Barcelona 1991).
- "L'arquebisbe Fèlix Amat (1750–1824) i l'última Il·lustració espanyola". Presentation of Miquel Batllori (Barcelona 1992) 686 p.
- "Regest de la documentació del segle XX sobre Catalunya i la Santa Seu conservada a l'Arxiu Secret Vaticà. I. Fons de la Nunciatura de Madrid (1899–1921)". (Barcelona 1992) 345 p.
- "L'evangelització d'Europa i el cardenal Danneels", published in Catalunya Cristiana, Barcelona, 9 December 1999.
- "L'Ernest Lluch, estudiós de la cultura catalana del XVIII. Una aportació a la història de la Il·lustració i del Jansenisme a Catalunya". Published in Revista Econòmica de Catalunya 42, 107–111 (Barcelona 2001).
- "Josep Puig i Cadafalch: un polític catalanista i catòlic. Els fets de Corpus de Barcelona de 1919", (Mataró 2002) 92 p. Published also in Analecta Sacra Tarraconensia, núm. 74, 433–492 (Barcelona 2002).
- "Josep Puig i Cadafalch: un polític catalanista i catòlic. Els fets de Corpus de Barcelona de 1919", (Mataró 2002) 92 p. Published also in Analecta Sacra Tarraconensia, núm. 74, 433–492 (Barcelona 2002).
- "Regest de la documentació del segle XX sobre Catalunya i la Santa Seu conservada a l'Arxiu Secret Vaticà. II. Fons Secretaria d'Estat (1899–1921)". (Barcelona 2003) 196 p.
- Publication and annotation of the historic memory "La Cartoixa de Montalegre durant la Revolució de 1909", published in Analecta Sacra Tarraconensia, núm. 77, 273–308 (Barcelona 2004).
- "Regest de la documentació del segle XIX sobre Catalunya i la Santa Seu conservada a l'Arxiu Secret Vaticà. I. Fons de la Nunciatura de Madrid (1887–1899)". (Barcelona 2005) 387 p.
- "La Cartoixa de Montalegre durant la Setmana Tràgica de 1909". Published in La Província Cartoixana de Catalunya. La Cartoixa de Montalegre. Actes del XXIII Congrés Internacional sobre la Cartoixa, (La Conreria, 5–8 maig 2005) (Barcelona 2007). Published also in Analecta Sacra Tarraconensia, núm. 80, 497–506 (Barcelona 2007).
- "Regest de documentació del segle XIX sobre Catalunya i la Santa Seu conservada a l'Arxiu Secret Vaticà. II. Fons de la Nunciatura de Madrid (1877–1887)". (Barcelona 2007) 477 p.
- Historic work about Obra Benèfico-Social del Nen Déu. Conferència inaugural del centenari de l'Obra Benèfico-Social del Nen Déu (extracte) a FRANCESC MUÑOZ I ALARCÓN, Fundació Obra Benéfico-Social del Nen Déu (Barcelona 2007) 11–30.
- "La figura episcopal i pública de Josep Climent a Barcelona (1766–1775)". Conferència pronunciada a la seu de la Reial Acadèmia de Bones Lletres de Barcelona, el 22 de novembre de 2006, published in Analecta Sacra Tarraconensia, núm. 80, 538–558 (Barcelona 2007).
- "La visita apostòlica de 1928 del nunci Tedeschini a Barcelona. Un intent de repressió d'una pastoral en català." Published in Analecta Sacra Tarraconensia, núm. 81, 197–608 (Barcelona 2008).
- "Anticlericalisme i Setmana Tràgica. Algunes reflexions." Published in Analecta Sacra Tarraconensia, núm. 82, 545–576 (Barcelona 2009).
- "Documentació sobre la Setmana Tràgica conservada a l'Arxiu Secret Vaticà", en Actes de les Jornades sobre la Setmana Tràgica (1909), Barcelona, 5-6–7 May 2009. Published in Analecta Sacra Tarraconensia, núm. 82, 649–687 (Barcelona 2009).
- "L'Arxiu Secret Vaticà: una font inèdita i complementària per a l'estudi de la Setmana Tràgica". Publicat a Serra d'Or núm. 593 – mayo 2009, 20/372-24/37 (Barcelona 2009).
- "La Setmana Tràgica de 1909: l'Arxiu Secret Vaticà (Scripta et Documenta, 82)". Barcelona: Publicacions de l'Abadia de Montserrat, 2009, 607 p. il. fot.
- "L'Arxiu Secret Vaticà", published in Solc, núm.65, 20–23 (Solsona 2009).
- "Anticlericalisme i Setmana Tràgica. Algunes reflexions". Published in Els fets de la Setmana Tràgica (1909). Actos de las Jornadas organizadas por el Centre d'Història Contemporània de Catalunya (28 y 29 de mayo de 2009) 151–180.
- Final report about Tedeschini's apostolic visit in Catalunya in 1928. Published in Analecta Sacra Tarraconensia, núm. 83, 485–558 (Barcelona 2010).
- "El beat Josep Samsó i Elias i el seu missatge avui" (Barcelona 2010) 31 p.
- "El beato Samsó y Elías y su mensaje hoy" (Barcelona 2010) 32 p.
- "El beat Samsó" a Solc núm. 67, 6–10 (Solsona 2010).
- "El beat Samsó, model per a preveres d'avui". Published in Temes d'avui, revista de Teologia i Qüestions Actuals, núm. 35, 71–80 (Barcelona 2010).
- Participació en el I Congrés Internacional sobre Educació, amb el títol: ¿Una sociedad despersonalizada? Propuestas educativas. Organitza la Universitat Abat Oliba-CEU, dies 13 a 15 de maig de 2010.
- "La visita apostòlica de 1928 del nunci Tedeschini a Barcelona i el seu informe final". Inaugural lesson of 2010–2011 academic year in Aules d'Història Eclesiàstica de Catalunya, organised by Biblioteca Balmes, 28 October 2010.
- "Rellevància de l'Encíclica Caritas in veritate". Presentation: El desarrollo humano integral: comentarios interdisciplinares a la Encíclica "Caritas in veritate" de Benedicto XVI. Editors: Domènec Melé i Josep M. Castellà. Barcelona: Iter, 2010. Organised by Biblioteca Balmes. Presideix l'acte el senyor cardenal Lluís Martínez Sistach. Sala d'actes de la Fundació Balmesiana, 21 February 2011.
- "El beat Samsó, lliçó que ens il·lumina". Published in Teologia actual, núm. 80, 25–33 (Barcelona 2011).
- "La visita del nunci Tedeschini 1928–1929 a Montserrat". Published in Analecta Sacra Tarraconensia, núm. 84, 839–970 (Barcelona 2011).
- "El context històric, social i religiós en temps de Jaume Balmes". Conference in Jornada Acadèmica sobre Jaume Balmes, 23 March 2011.
- "La redacció dels decrets de la Cúria romana (1928–1929) sobre la "Qüestió catalana" durant la Dictadura de Primo de Rivera". Published in Analecta Sacra Tarraconensia, núm. 85, 5–142 (Barcelona 2012).
- "Balmes polític i el seu context històric" en Crònica científica de la Jornada Balmesiana, Biblioteca Balmes, 3 May 2011. Published in Analecta Sacra Tarraconensia, núm. 85, 637–645 (Barcelona 2012).
- "El temple parroquial de la Concepció de Barcelona, proclamat basílica menor". Published in Teologia Actual, núm. 87, 19–24 (Barcelona 2012).
- "La recepció dels bisbes de la Tarraconense dels decrets de la Santa Seu (1928–1929) sobre la "Qüestió catalana"“. Published in Analecta Sacra Tarraconensia, núm. 86, 313–732 (Barcelona 2013).
- "El cardenal Vidal i Barraquer i la "Qüestió catalana" durant la Dictadura de Primo de Rivera (1923–1930). Reflexions des de la historiografia i des de la pastoral setanta anys després de la seva mort". Published in Revista Catalana de Teologia, 39/2, 845–871 (Barcelona 2014).
- "El cardenal Vidal i Barraquer i la "Qüestió catalana" durant la Dictadura de Primo de Rivera". (Barcelona 2014) Press.
- "La dictadura de Primo de Rivera i l'Església catalana". Conference, 15 May 2014, "Any Cardenal Vidal i Barraquer, testimoni fidel, 1943".
- "La reacció del clergat i dels seglars als Decrets de la Santa Seu (1928–1929) sobre la "Qüestió catalana"”. Published in Analecta Sacra Tarraconensia, núm. 88, 5–268 (Barcelona 2015).
- "Regests de la documentació del segle XIX sobre Catalunya i la Santa Seu conservada a l'Arxiu Secret Vaticà i a la Secretaria d'Estat. III: Fons de la Secretaria d'Estat (1877–1899)". (Barcelona 2015) 208 p.
- "Pastura les meves ovelles". Miscellany to Lluís Martínez Sistach, Barcelona 2015.
- "El catalanisme del bisbe Josep Torras i Bages i els intents d'enviar-lo fora de Vic". In Projecte Episcopus, Bisbat de Vic, 2016, 11 p. (press).

== Bibliography ==
Ramon Corts i Blay: L'arquebisbe Fèlix Amat (1750-1824) i l'última Il·lustració espanyola, Barcelona 1992.

Ramon Corts i Blay et al.: Diccionari d’història eclesiàstica de Catalunya, Barcelona 1998.
