= Museu Frederic Marès =

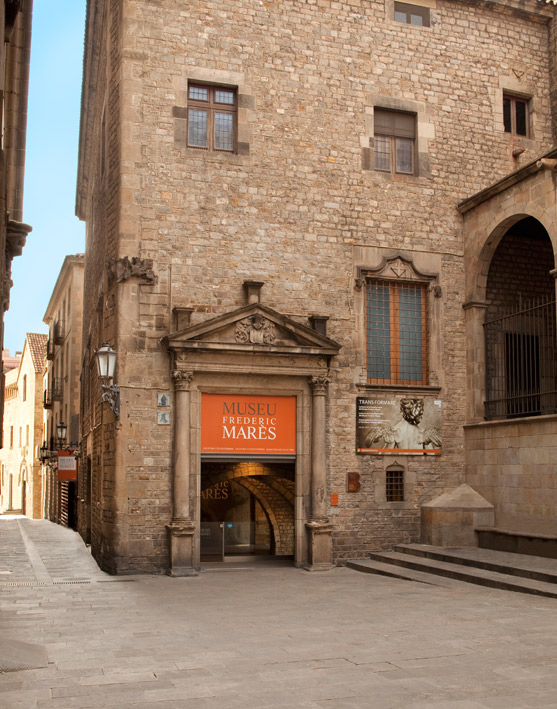
- Entrance
- Established: 1946
- Location: Plaça de Sant Iu, 5–6, Barcelona, Spain
- Coordinates: 41.384201°N 2.176698°E
- Type: art gallery
- Public transit access: Jaume I
- Website: www.barcelona.cat/museufredericmares/ca

The Museu Frederic Marès [muˈzɛw fɾəðəˈɾiɡ məˈɾɛs] is an art and sculpture museum in the Palau Reial Major in Barcelona, Spain.

The Museu contains thousands of items from the collection of sculptor Frederic Marès. Located near the Barcelona Cathedral, the museum collection includes statuary from pre-Roman times through to the first half of the Twentieth Century, with a particular emphasis on medieval Christian art, and a separate 'Collector's Cabinet' of artisan items such as fans and keys.
