= Eulalia of Barcelona =

Catalan martyr and saint (c. 289–303)

Saint St Eulalia of Barcelona
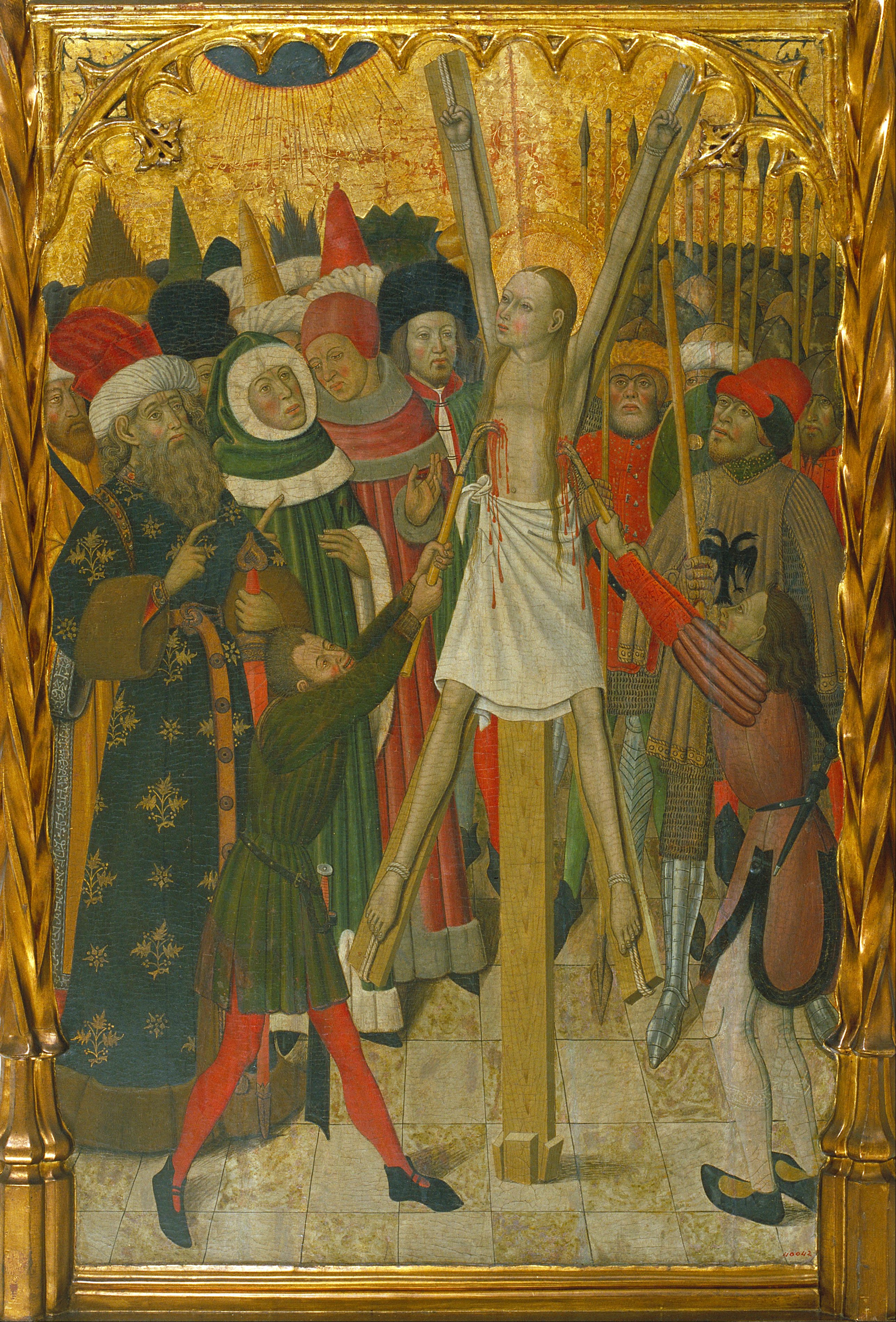
- Bernat Martorell's Martyrdom of Saint Eulalia, 1442–1445 (Museu Nacional d'Art de Catalunya).

Virgin and martyr
- Born: c. 289; Barcelonum, Hispania Tarraconensis (modern Barcelona, Spain)
- Died: 12 February 303 (aged 13); Barcelonum, Hispania Tarraconensis
- Venerated in: Roman Catholicism; Anglicanism; Lutheranism; Eastern Orthodoxy
- Canonized: 633 by Pope Vitalian
- Major shrine: Cathedral of Santa Eulàlia, Barcelona
- Feast: February 12 (August 22 and December 10 in the Orthodox Church)
- Attributes: Saltire, stake, dove
- Patronage: Barcelona, Spain; sailors; against drought

Eulalia (c. 289 – February 12, 303) was a 13-year-old Roman Christian virgin who was martyred in Barcelona during the persecution of Christians in the reign of emperor Diocletian (the Sequence of Saint Eulalia mentions his co-emperor the "pagan king" Maximian). She is a patron saint of Barcelona. There is some dispute as to whether she is the same person as Eulalia of Mérida, whose story is similar.

== History ==
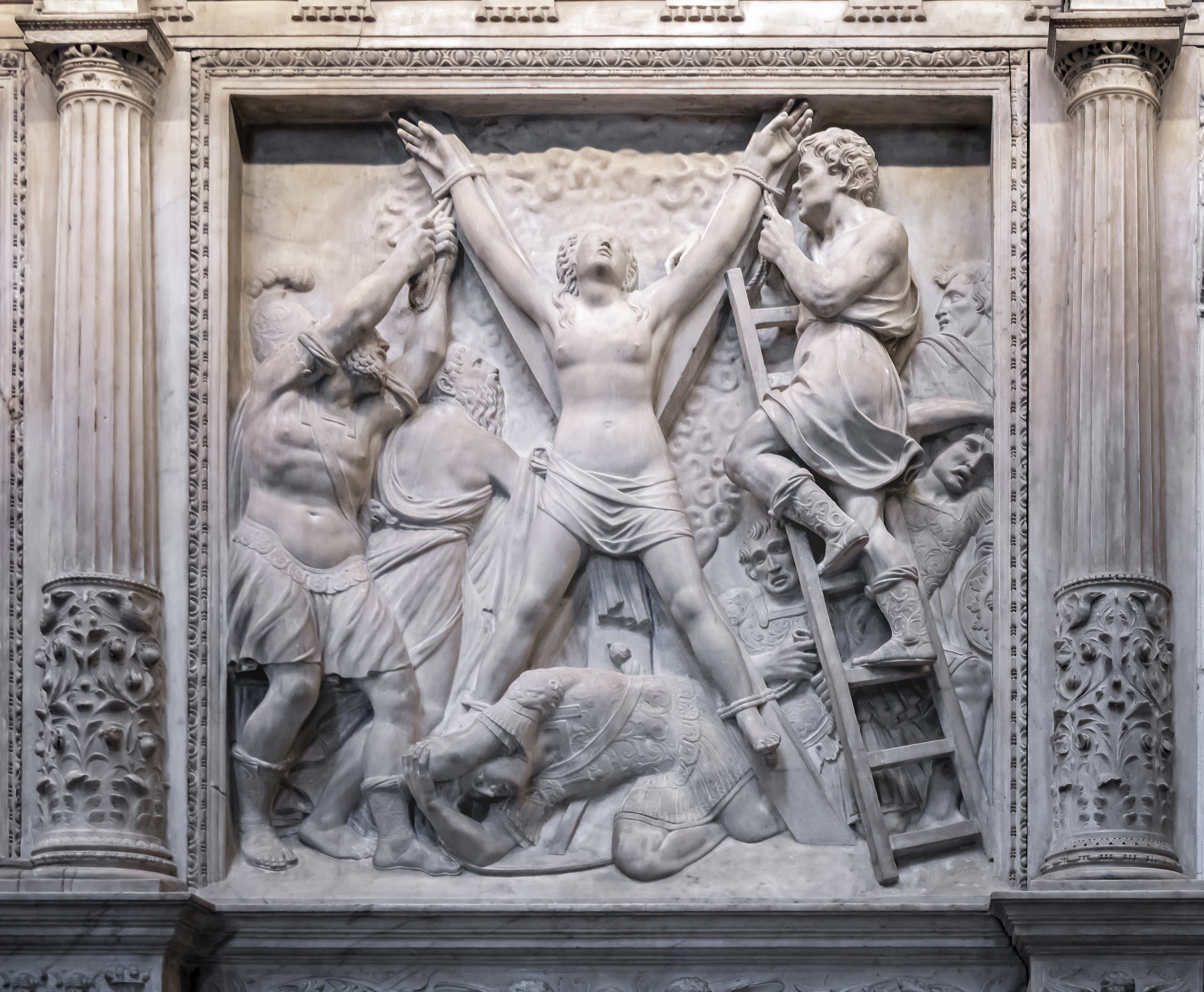
Relief of the martyrdom of Saint Eulalia in Barcelona Cathedral

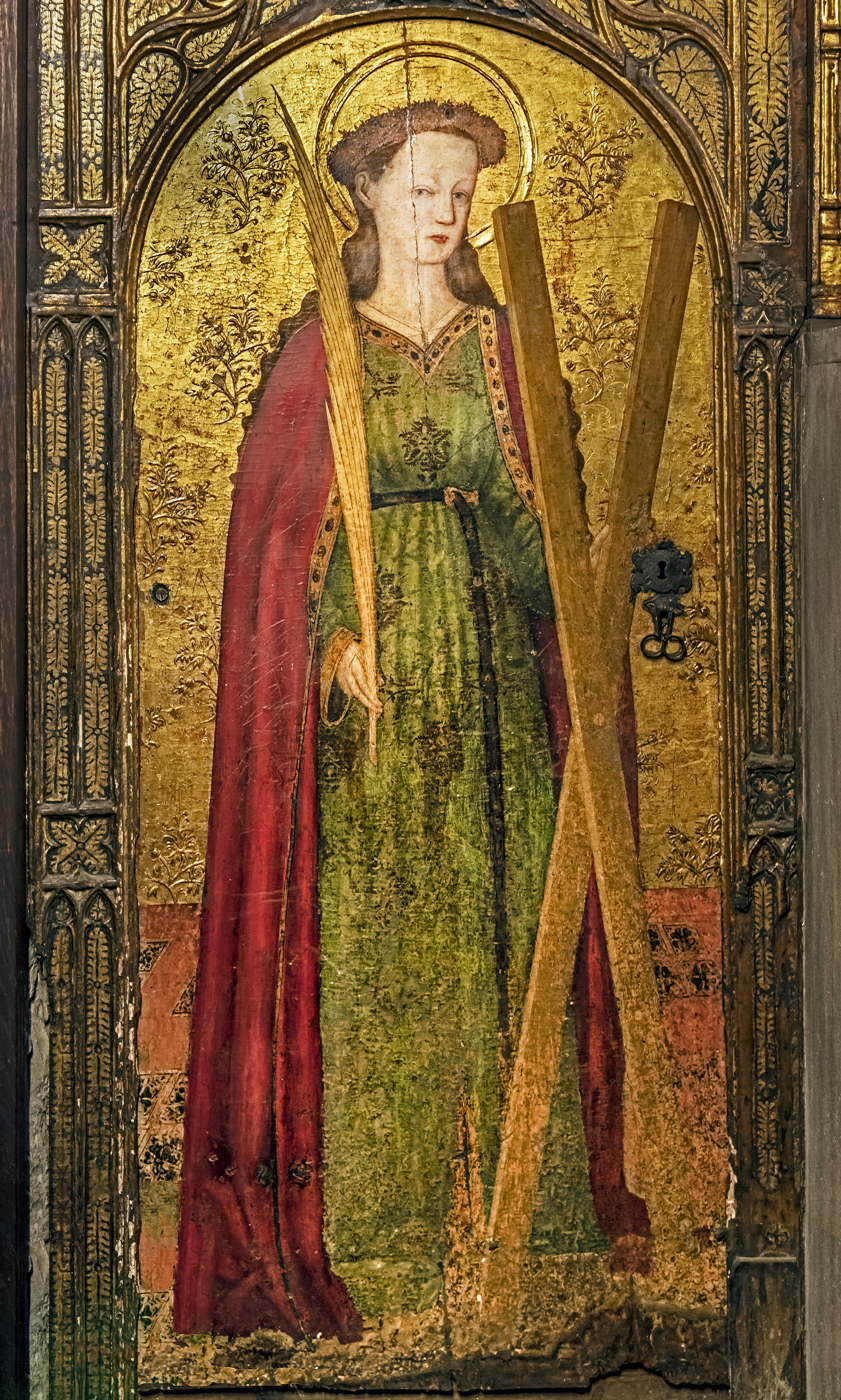
Painting of Eulalia with the saltire in the Cathedral of the Holy Cross and Saint Eulalia in Barcelona

According to the Orthodox Church in America, Eulalia, age thirteen, was the daughter of a noble family that lived near the city of Barcelona. Amid the persecutions of Christians under Roman emperors Diocletian and Maximian, governor Dacian arrived in the city intending to carry out the persecutions. Sometime later, Eulalia left her home, entered the city, and publicly confronted the governor for the persecution of Christians. In response, Dacian ordered Eulalia to be stripped and tortured by various methods, including flagellation. Eulalia prayed that God would take her to Heaven, and died from her wounds.

According to tradition, her tortures culminated in her crucifixion on an X-shaped cross, a so-called saltire, and she is depicted with this cross as the instrument of her martyrdom. However, it has been posited that she was instead publicly tortured to death on an X-frame and her body left on display, artistic depictions of which leading to the later belief that she was crucified.

== Veneration ==
Her body was originally interred in the church of Santa Maria de les Arenes (St. Mary of the Sands; now Santa Maria del Mar, St. Mary of the Sea). It was hidden in 713 during the Moorish invasion, and only recovered in 878. In 1339, it was relocated to an alabaster sarcophagus in the crypt of the newly built Cathedral of Santa Eulalia. The festival of Saint Eulalia is held in Barcelona for a week around her feast day on February 12.

Eulalia is commemorated with statues and street names throughout Barcelona. For example, Eulalia is traditionally believed to have been placed in a barrel with shards of glass and rolled down the street named Baixada de Santa Eulàlia ("Saint Eulalia's descent").

== See also ==
- Sequence of Saint Eulalia – French hagiography from AD 880
- Saint Eulalia of Barcelona, patron saint archive
