= Basilica of the Immaculate Conception (Barcelona) =

- Basilica of the Immaculate Conception and Assumption of Our Lady
- La Concepció
- Basílica de la Puríssima Concepció i Assumpció de Nostra Senyora
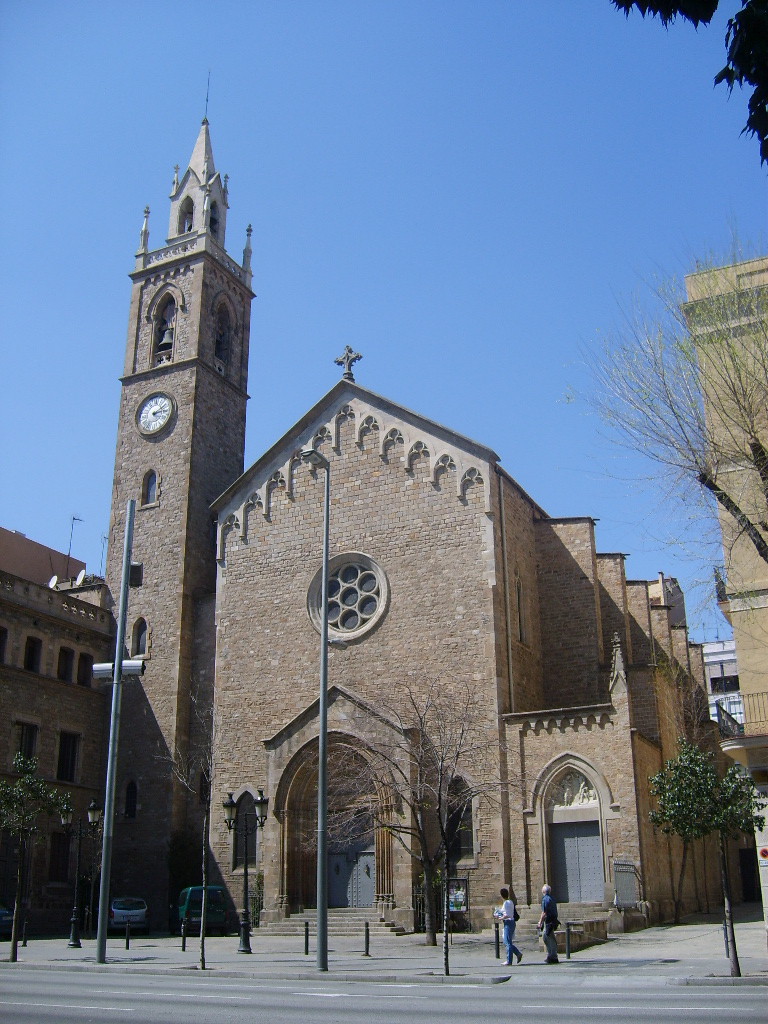

- Location within Barcelona
- 41°23′41″N 2°10′3″E
- Location: Barcelona, Catalonia
- Country: Spain
- Denomination: Catholic

History
- Status: Basilica
- Dedication: Immaculate Conception, Assumption of Our Lady

Administration
- Archdiocese: Barcelona

The Basilica of the Immaculate Conception and Assumption of Our Lady is a basilica in Barcelona, Catalonia. The church originated as the Jonqueres Monastery, that was moved stone by stone when the land of the monastery was to be demolished. In 1879, a bell tower was added from the church of San Miguel which was also going to be demolished. The rectory stands on the left side of the bell tower and is a historicist building built at the end of the 19th century. On 20 February 2009, Pope Benedict XVI granted the title of minor basilica to the church, which became the eighth basilica in the city.

Ramon Corts i Blay is the current Rector of the Basilica.
