= Barcelona Cathedral =

Gothic cathedral and seat of the Archbishop of Barcelona, Spain

- Metropolitan Cathedral Basilica of the Holy Cross and Saint Eulalia
- Catalan: Basilica Catedral Metropolitana de la Santa Creu i Santa Eulàlia; Spanish: Basílica Catedral Metropolitana de la Santa Cruz y Santa Eulalia
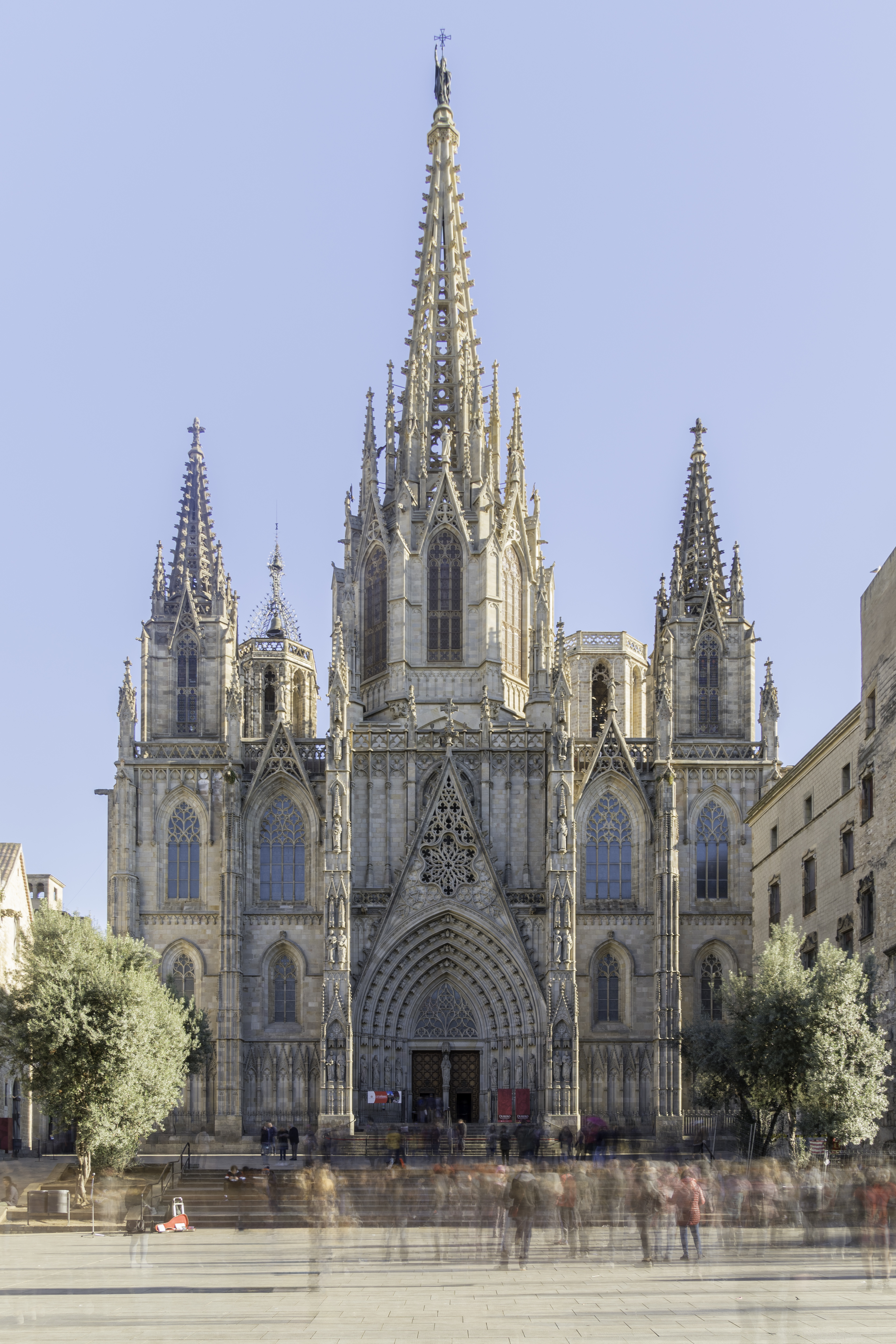
- West façade in 2019.
- Barcelona Cathedral
- 41°23′02″N 2°10′35″E
- Location: Barcelona
- Address: Pla de la Seu
- Country: Spain
- Denomination: Catholic
- Website: catedralbcn.org/en

History
- Status: Metropolitan Cathedral Basilica
- Dedication: The Holy Cross and Saint Eulalia of Barcelona
- Dedicated: 18 November 1058 (Note: Consecration of the Romanesque cathedral. The latter, Gothic building was never formally consecrated, as it was considered a "significant extension" but not a new cathedral.)

Architecture
- Architect: Jaume Fabre (first known)
- Style: Catalan Gothic, Gothic Revival
- Groundbreaking: 1 May 1298
- Completed: 1913 (west façade and dome)

Specifications
- Length: 93 m (305 ft)
- Width: 40 m (130 ft)

Administration
- Archdiocese: Barcelona

Clergy
- Archbishop: Juan José Omella

Spanish Cultural Heritage
- Type: Non-movable
- Criteria: Monument
- Designated: 2 November 1929
- Reference no.: RI-51-0000338

The Cathedral of the Holy Cross and Saint Eulalia (Catalan: Catedral de la Santa Creu i Santa Eulàlia), also known as Barcelona Cathedral, is the seat of the archbishop of Barcelona in Catalonia, Spain. The cathedral was constructed from the thirteenth to fifteenth centuries, with the principal work done in the fourteenth century. The cloister, which encloses the Well of the Geese (Font de les Oques), was completed in 1448. In the late nineteenth century, the neo-Gothic façade was constructed over the undistinguished exterior that was common to Catalan churches.

Its form is a pseudo-basilica, vaulted over five aisles, the outer two divided into chapels. The transept is truncated. The east end is a chevet of nine radiating chapels connected by an ambulatory. The high altar is raised, allowing a clear view into the crypt.

The cathedral is dedicated to the Holy Cross and Eulalia of Barcelona, co-patron saint of Barcelona, a young virgin martyr who, according to Catholic tradition, suffered martyrdom during Roman times in the city. One story says that she was exposed naked in the public square and a miraculous snowfall in mid-spring covered her nudity. The enraged Romans put her into a barrel with knives stuck into it and rolled it down a street (according to tradition, the one now called Baixada de Santa Eulàlia). The relics of Saint Eulalia are entombed in the cathedral's crypt.

The choir stalls retain the coats-of-arms of the knights of the Order of the Golden Fleece. In his first trip into Spain, Charles V selected Barcelona as the site of a chapter of his order. The king had arrived for his investiture as Count of Barcelona. The city, as a Mediterranean port, offered the closest communication with other far-flung Habsburg dominions, while the large proportions of the cathedral would accommodate required grand ceremonies. In 1518, the Order's herald, Thomas Isaac, and its treasurer, Jean Micault, were commissioned to prepare the sanctuary for the first sitting of the chapter in 1519. Juan de Borgonya executed the painted decoration of the sanctuary.

The side Chapel of the Holy Sacrament and of the Holy Christ of Lepanto contains a cross said to date from the time of the Battle of Lepanto (1571).

In addition to Saints Eulalia and Olegarius, the cathedral contains the tombs of Saint Raymond of Penyafort, Count Ramon Berenguer I and his third wife Almodis de la Marche, and bishops Berenguer de Palou II, Salvador Casañas y Pagés, and Arnau de Gurb, who is buried in the Chapel of Santa Llúcia, which he had constructed.

The cathedral has a secluded Gothic cloister where 13 white geese are kept, the number explained by the assertion that Eulalia was 13 when she was martyred.

== History ==
Parts of an early Christian and Visigothic episcopal complex including the baptistery (fourth century), a basilical hall (fifth century), a cross shaped church (sixth-seventh century) and bishop's palace (sixth-seventh century) are displayed in Barcelona City History Museum archaeological underground. Reportedly, this Visigothic chapel was dedicated to Saint James, and was the proprietary church of the Viscounts of Barcelona. However, in a document from the Second Council of Barcelona in 599, it states that the cathedral was dedicated to the Holy Cross. This church was severely damaged by al-Mansur (Almanzor) during his attack on Barcelona in 985.

In 1046, Count Ramon Berenguer I and his wife Almodis, together with Bishop Guislabert, began construction of a Romanesque cathedral at the site; it was consecrated in November 1058. The cathedral was constructed over the crypt of the former church. It has been reported that a Viscount of Barcelona, Mir Geribert, sold the site to Bishop Guislebert in 1058. However, this date does not coincide with the reported start of construction.

The present Gothic cathedral was started on the foundations of the previous churches on 1 May 1298. James II the Just was King of Aragon at the time, and Bernat Pelegrí was Bishop of Barcelona. The church was built from the east end towards the west end, with a simple west façade completed in 1417. The cloister was completed in 1448, making the total duration of construction 150 years. In the late nineteenth century, Miguel Girona i Agrafel offered to complete the neo-Gothic façade and central tower as inspired by the original fifteenth-century design prepared by master Carlí and rearranged and drawn by the architect Josep Oriol Mestres. This work was completed in 1913 by Girona's children.

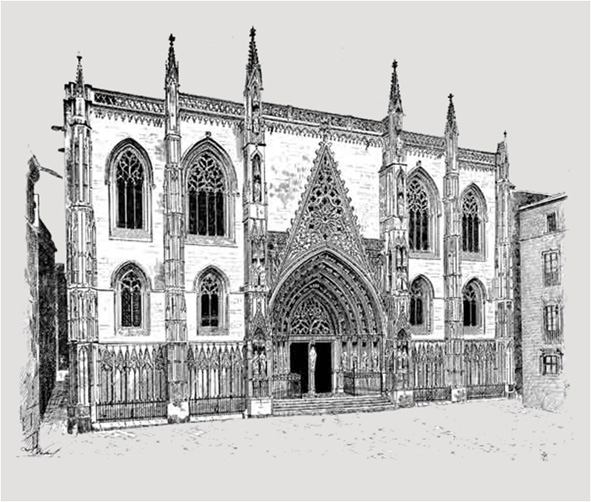
The façade in 1850 by Jenaro Pérez Villaamil, published in the work España artística y monumental

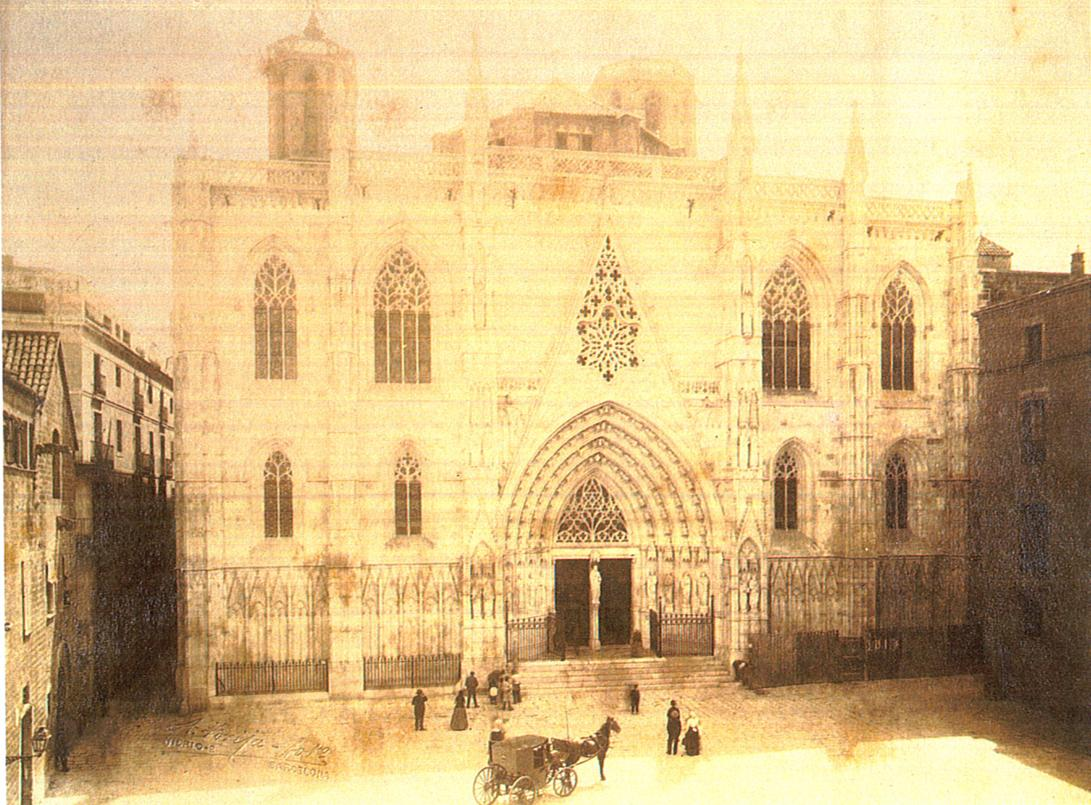
The reform of the façade at the commencement of the build in 1890

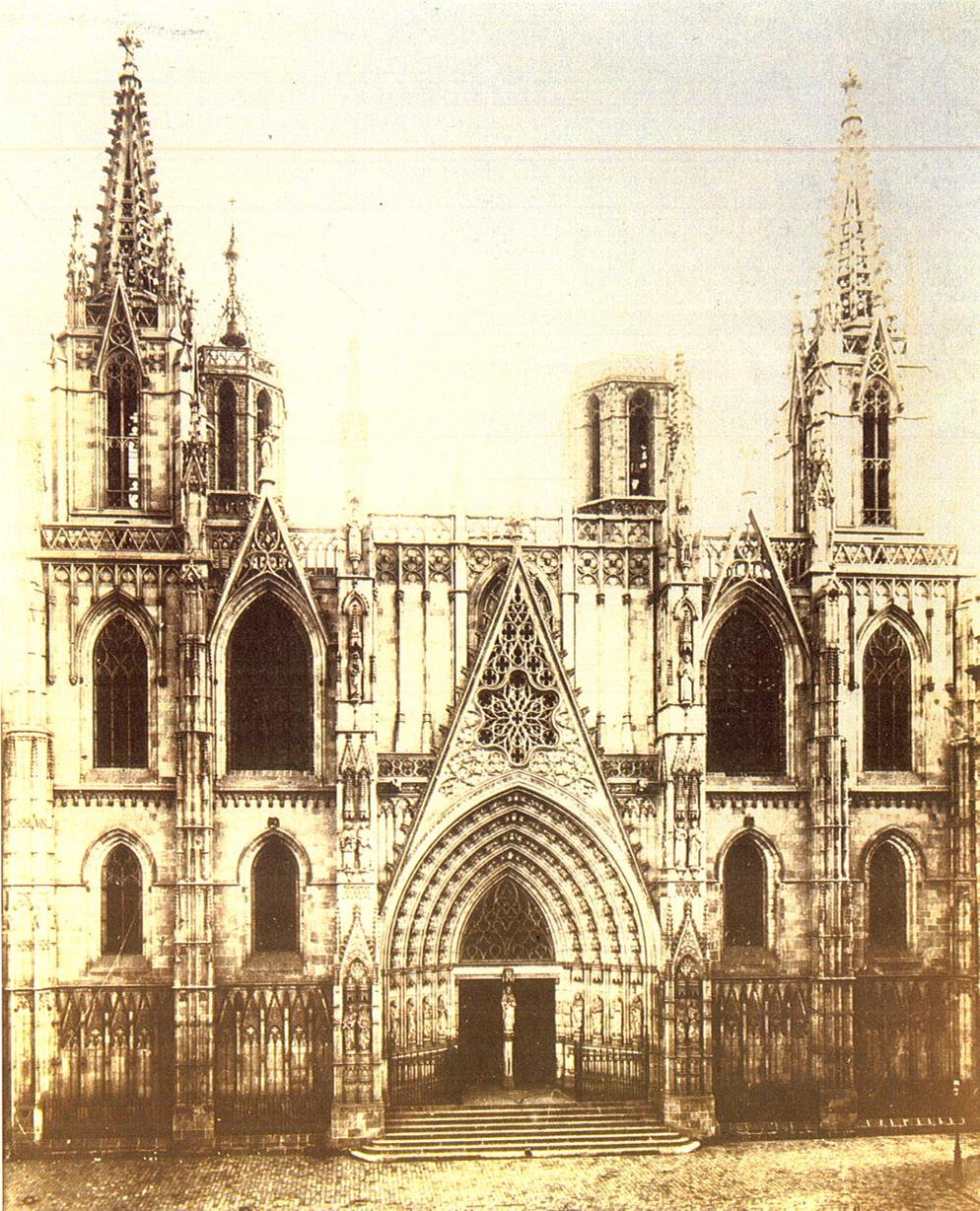
The façade with the lateral towers, around 1900

== Chapel of Lepanto ==
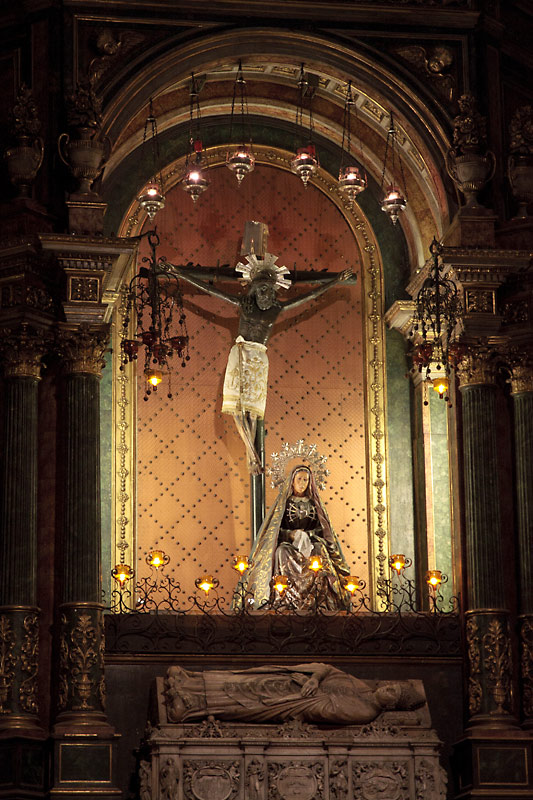
Christ of Lepanto over the tomb of Saint Olegarius in the cathedral's chapterhouse

The Chapel of the Holy Sacrament and of the Holy Christ of Lepanto is a small side chapel constructed by Arnau Bargués in 1407, as the chapterhouse. It was rebuilt in the seventeenth century to house the tomb of San Olegarius, Bishop of Barcelona, and Archbishop of Tarragona.

The "Holy Christ of Lepanto" crucifix is located on the upper part of the chapel entrance's front façade. The curved shape of the body, of Our Lord Jesus Christ on the Cross, is explained by a Catalan legend which holds that the cross was carried on the prow of the galley captained by Juan of Austria, half-brother of Spanish Philip II of Spain during the Battle of Lepanto in 1571. When a cannonball flew toward the cross, it leaned out of the way in order to avoid being hit, and has been inclined ever since. The Habsburgs were said to have regarded this as an encouraging omen.

A separate story says that the cross was in the ship's hold and the figure moved to cover a large hole which would have sunk the ship.

== Architecture ==
The architectural design of the Barcelona Cathedral consist of the regional style of Catalan Gothic. Catalan Gothic construction is confined to the Barcelona area and its influences. Catalan Gothic constructing consist of diaphanous areas and large spanning naves. Catalan Gothic does not seek to create towering buildings, but to balance the dimensions of the structure. The Barcelona Cathedral is 93 meters (305.1 feet) long, 40 meters (131.2 feet) wide, and 28 meters (91.8 feet) high at the central nave. Each bell tower of the cathedral is 54 meters (177.1 feet) in height. The tallest point of the cathedral reaches 70 meters (229.6 feet) at the peak of the cimborio. The cathedral consist of three naves, one choir, and a cloister. The nave carries through the plan to the choir and the isle naves are at disproportioned heights to structurally support the central nave and the cimborio. Each aisle has two chapels in every section. The choir consist of 10 ogive (pointed) arches whereas ribbed arches were placed in the nave. Large windows are placed opening to the cloister to provide sunlight to the choir. A windowed gallery runs atop the chapels in the aisle of the nave to provide indirect light. The facade is consistent with neo-Gothic design elements. Ornament of the cathedral facade is known for sculptural gargoyles on the roof along with many other animals and mythical creatures.

=== Gothic Quarter ===
The Barcelona Cathedral is located in the cathedral neighborhood in the Gothic quarter of Barcelona. As a showing of Catalonian nationalism, the mediaeval buildings of the Gothic quarter were restored from 1927 to 1970. Over 40 structures were remodeled in the gothic style to upgrade the area that became one of the most attractive parts of the city. The Catalan house was the building that shaped the rest of the Gothic quarter. Directly behind the cathedral, many buildings during the restoration of the neighborhood were demolished or renovated to match the style of the Catalan House. Reconstructing the gothic quarter around the rebuilt facade of the Barcelona Cathedral and the Catalan house gave the opportunity to embellish the city with its most important buildings. The transformation of the cathedral neighborhood gives Barcelona a historic image that creates a relationship between heritage and tourism.

== Traditions ==
- The tradition of the 'dancing egg' (supported by the jet of a fountain) is maintained on the day of Corpus Christi at the cathedral.

== Present day ==
The cathedral has been updated in response to an increasing number of tourists. The cloister now contains a gift shop, the traditional candles normally lit at the shrines of saints have been replaced with electronic candles, and cellular phones have been banned from the Chapel of Lepanto and other chapels.

== Images ==
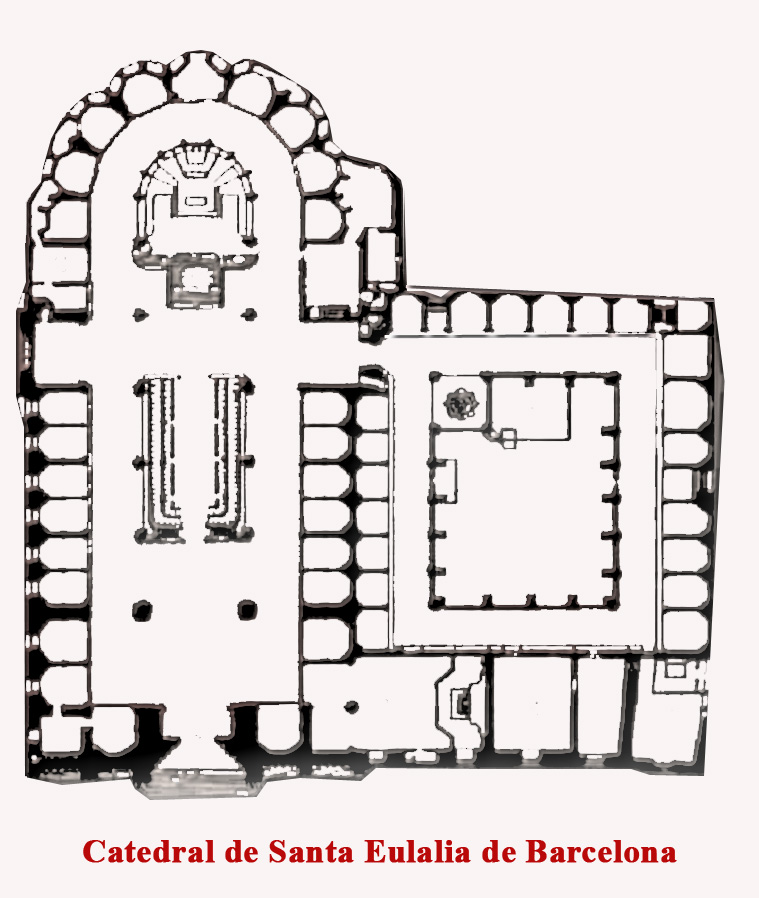
Cathedral plan

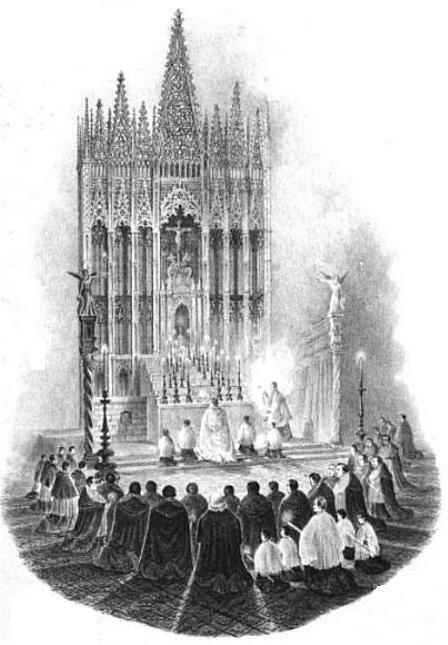
Illustration of the main altar (1839)

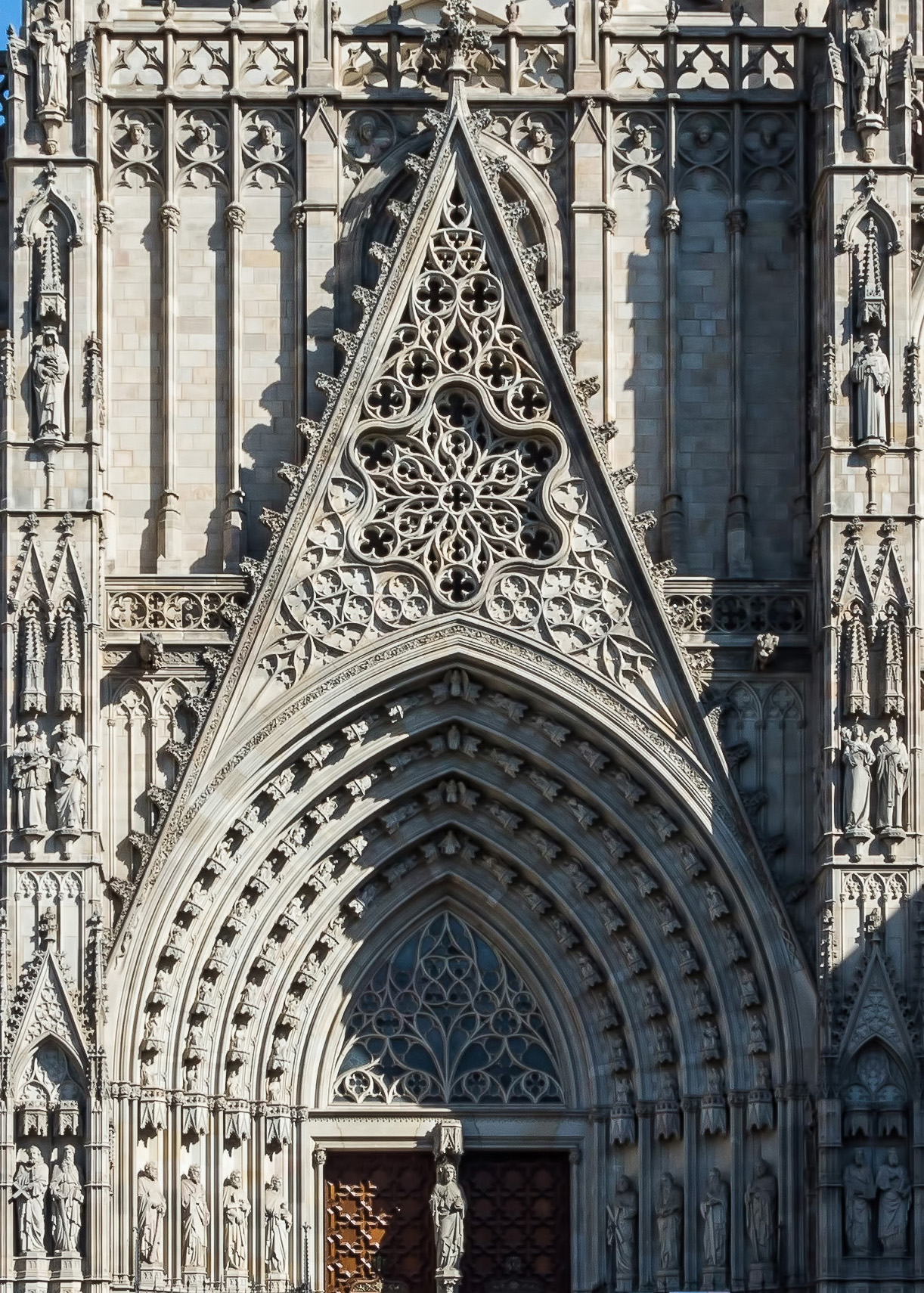
Main portal

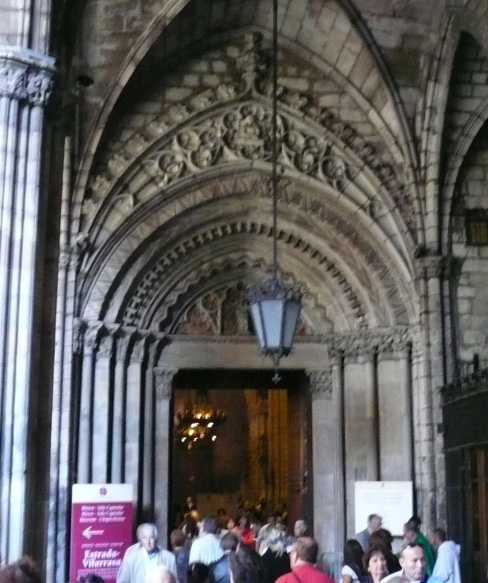
Door in the cloister

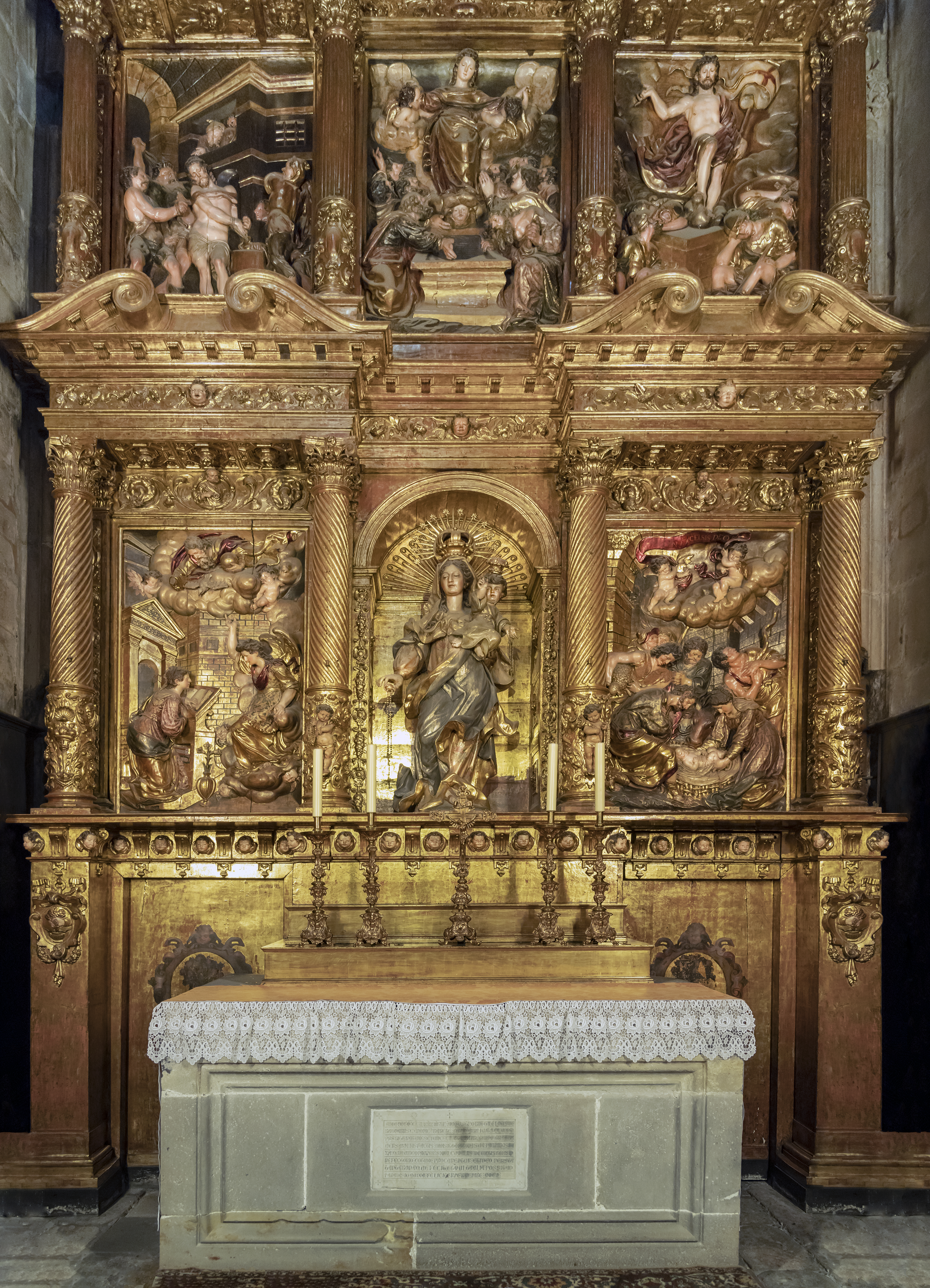
Chapel of Lady of the Rosebush

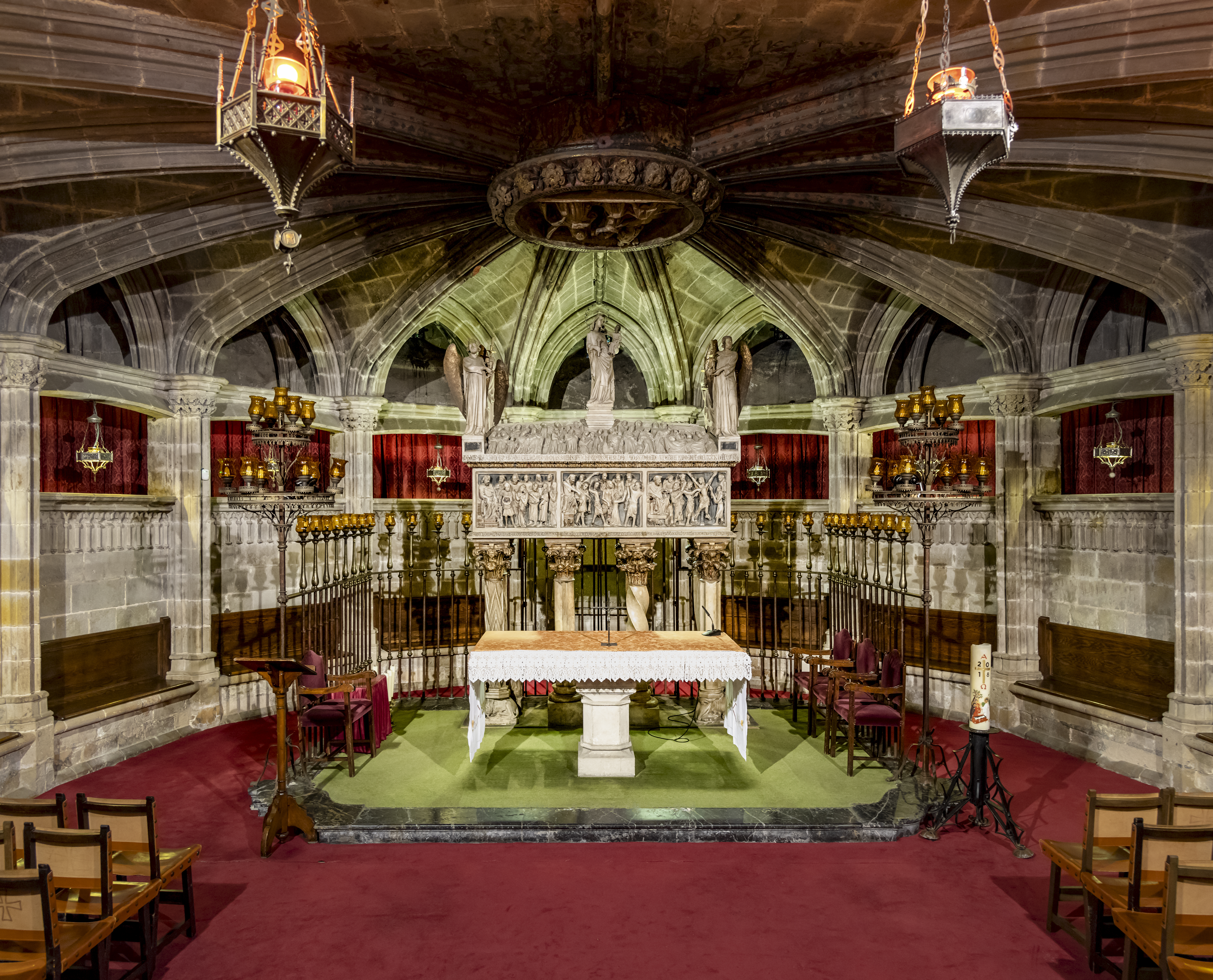
Saint Eulalia's crypt

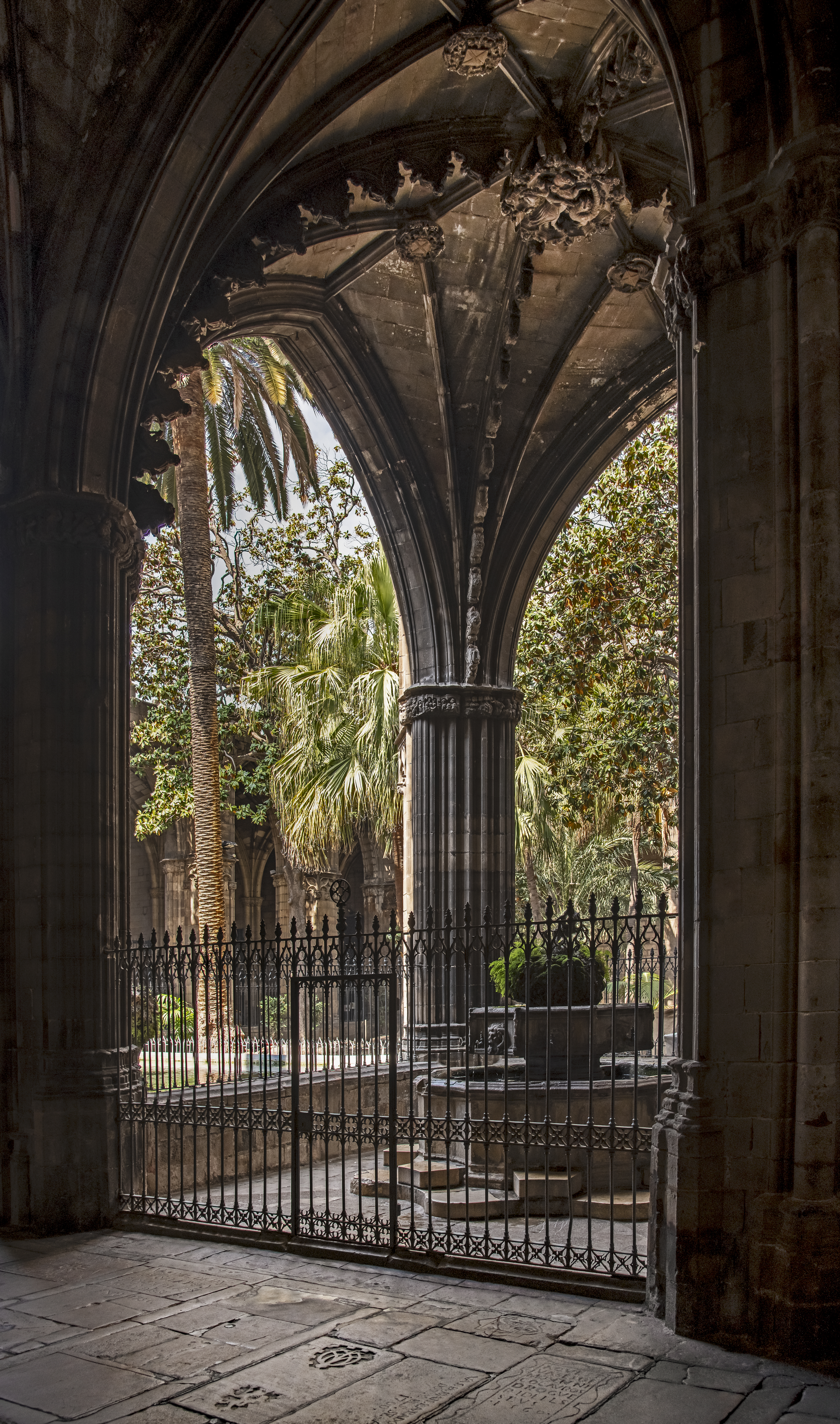
Cloister

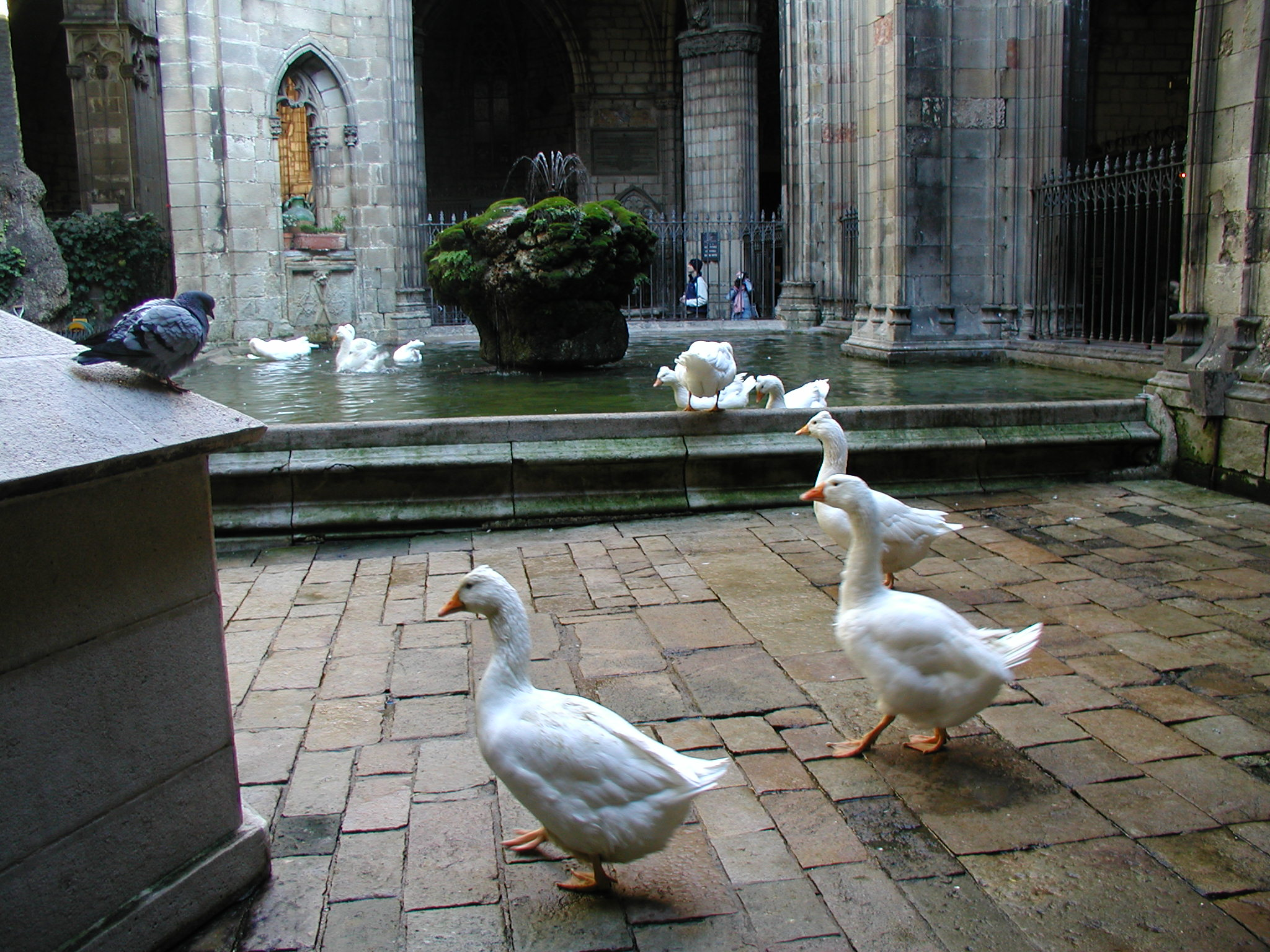
Geese in the cloister

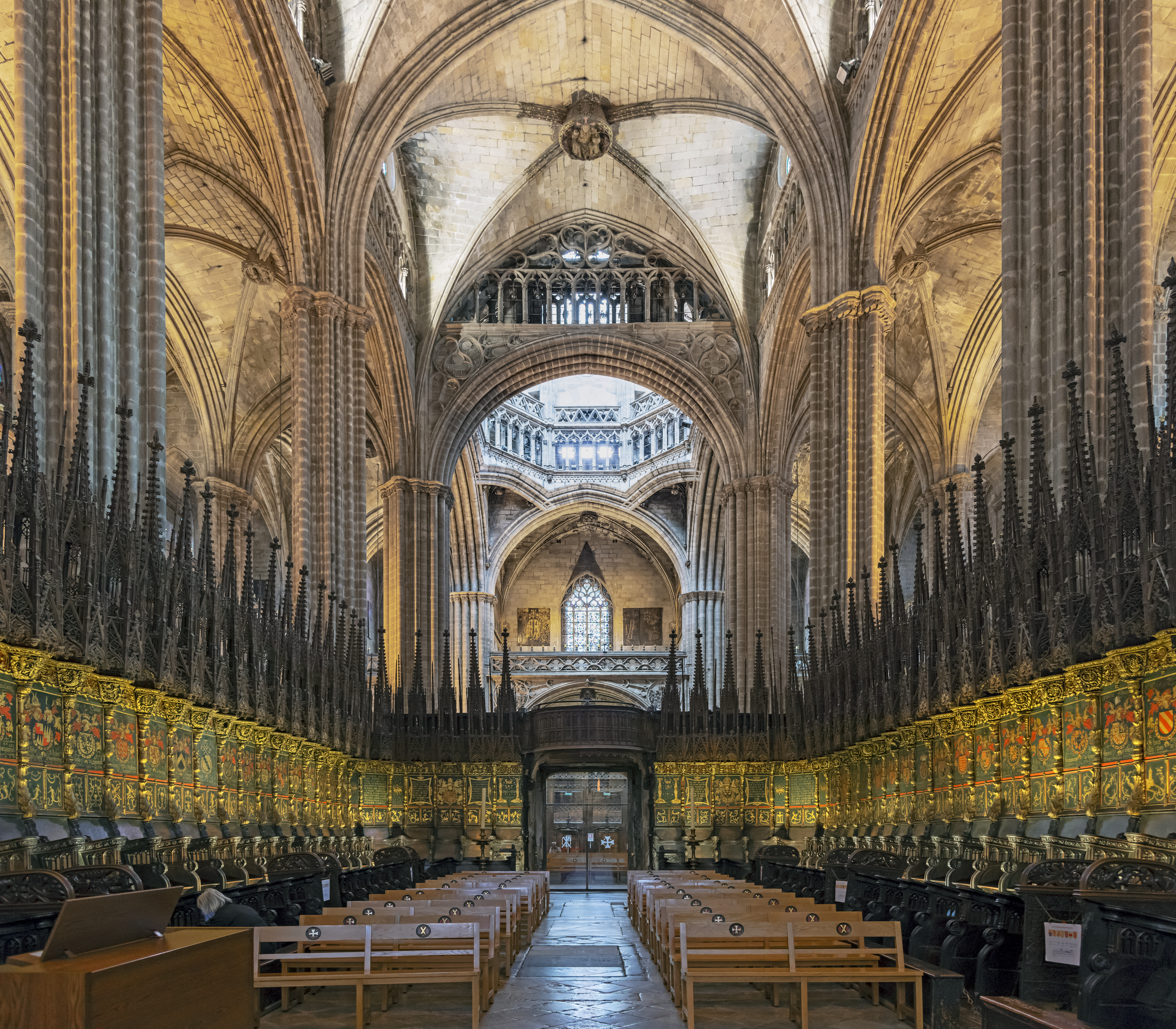
Choir seats at the cathedral

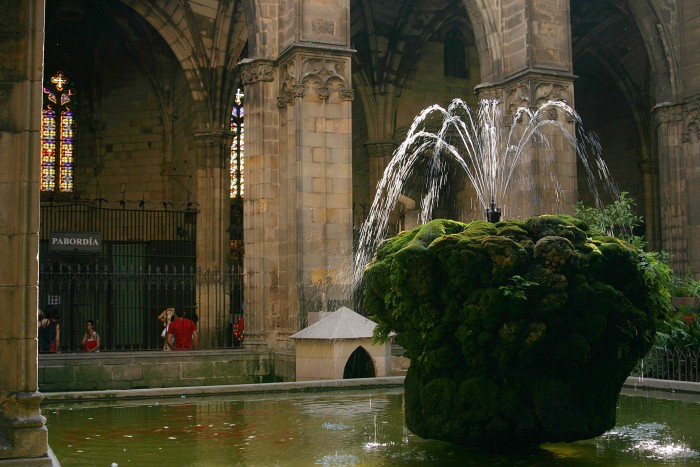
The fountain in the atrium

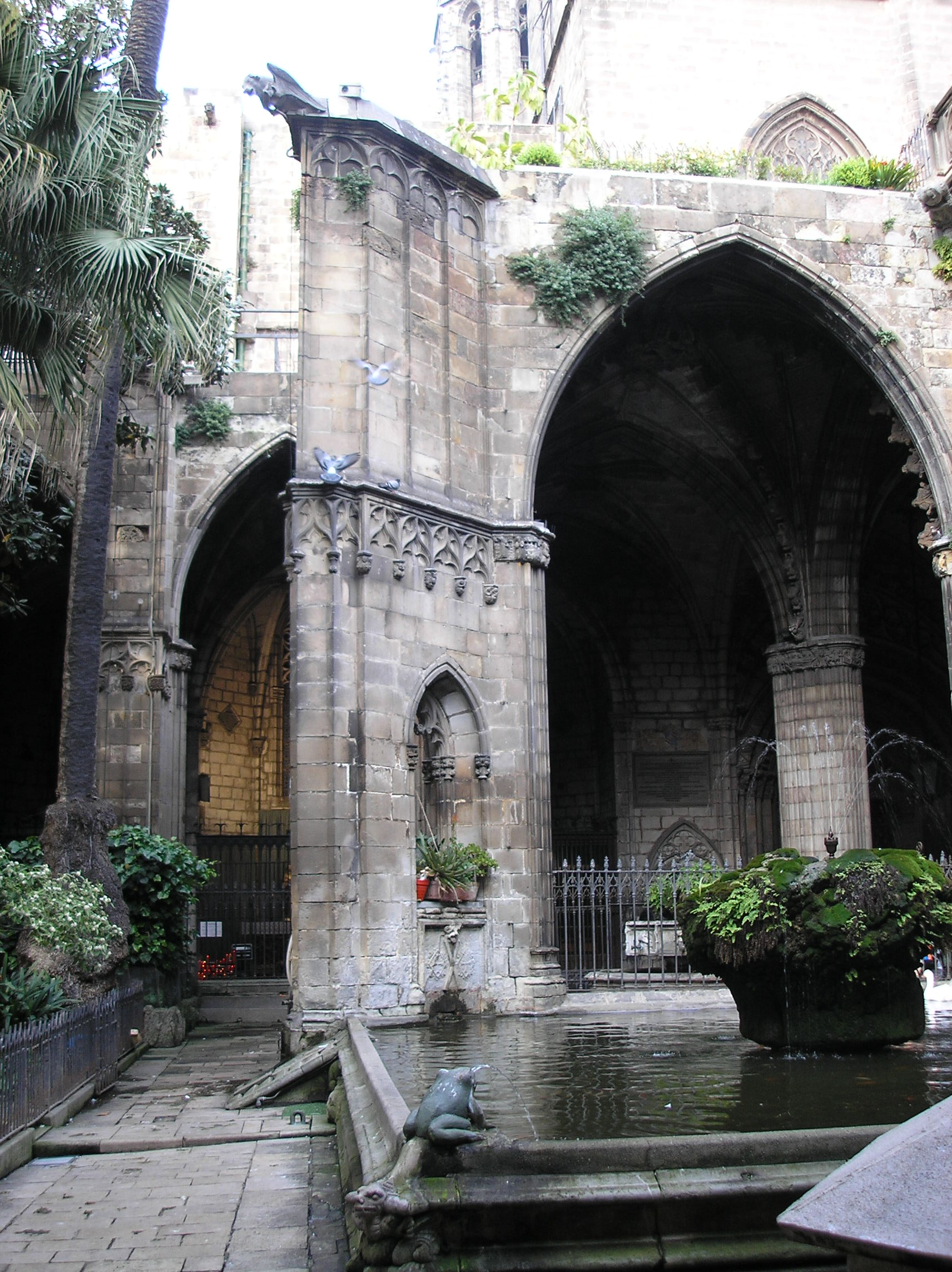
the Cathedral garden

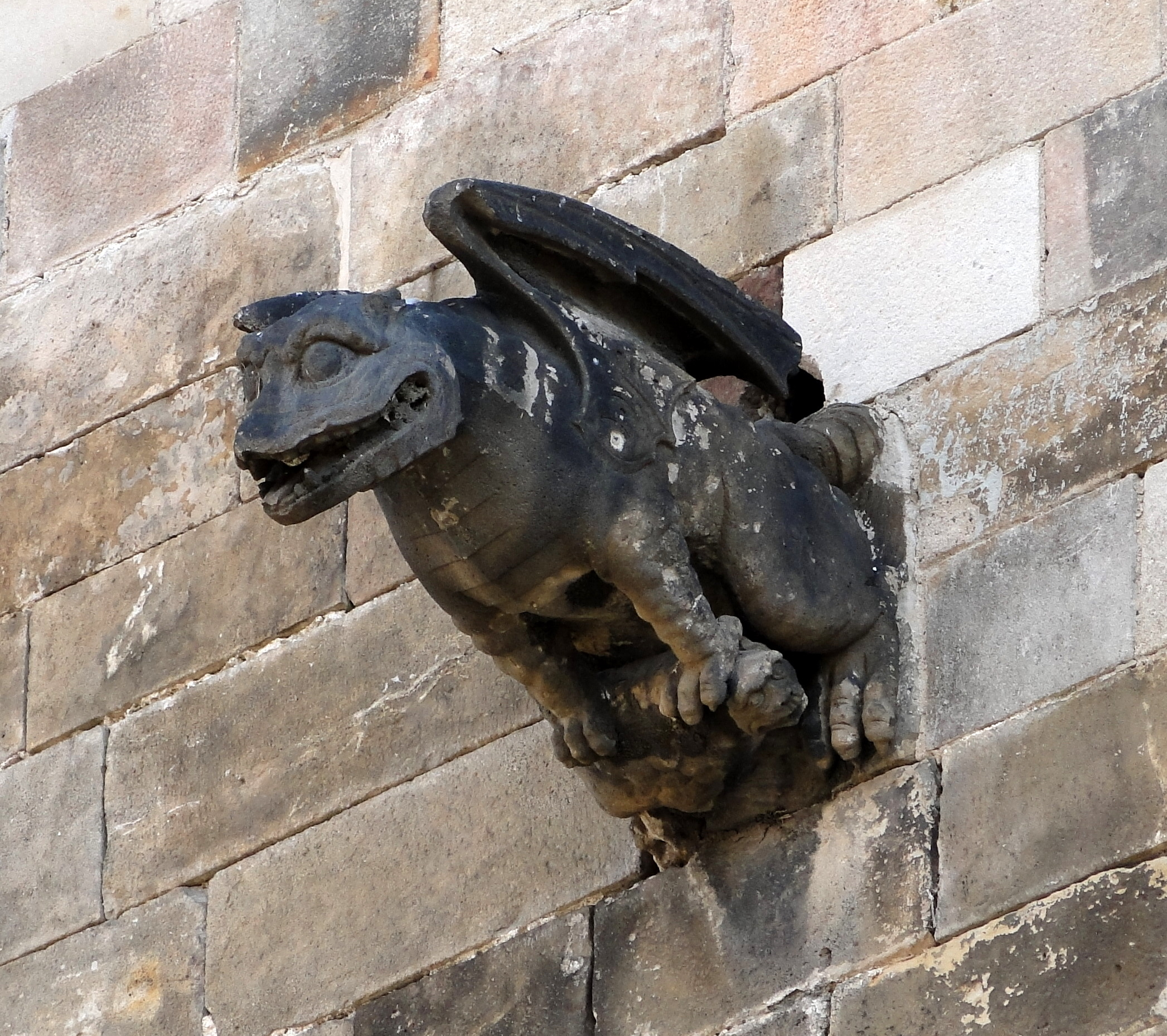
Gargoyle

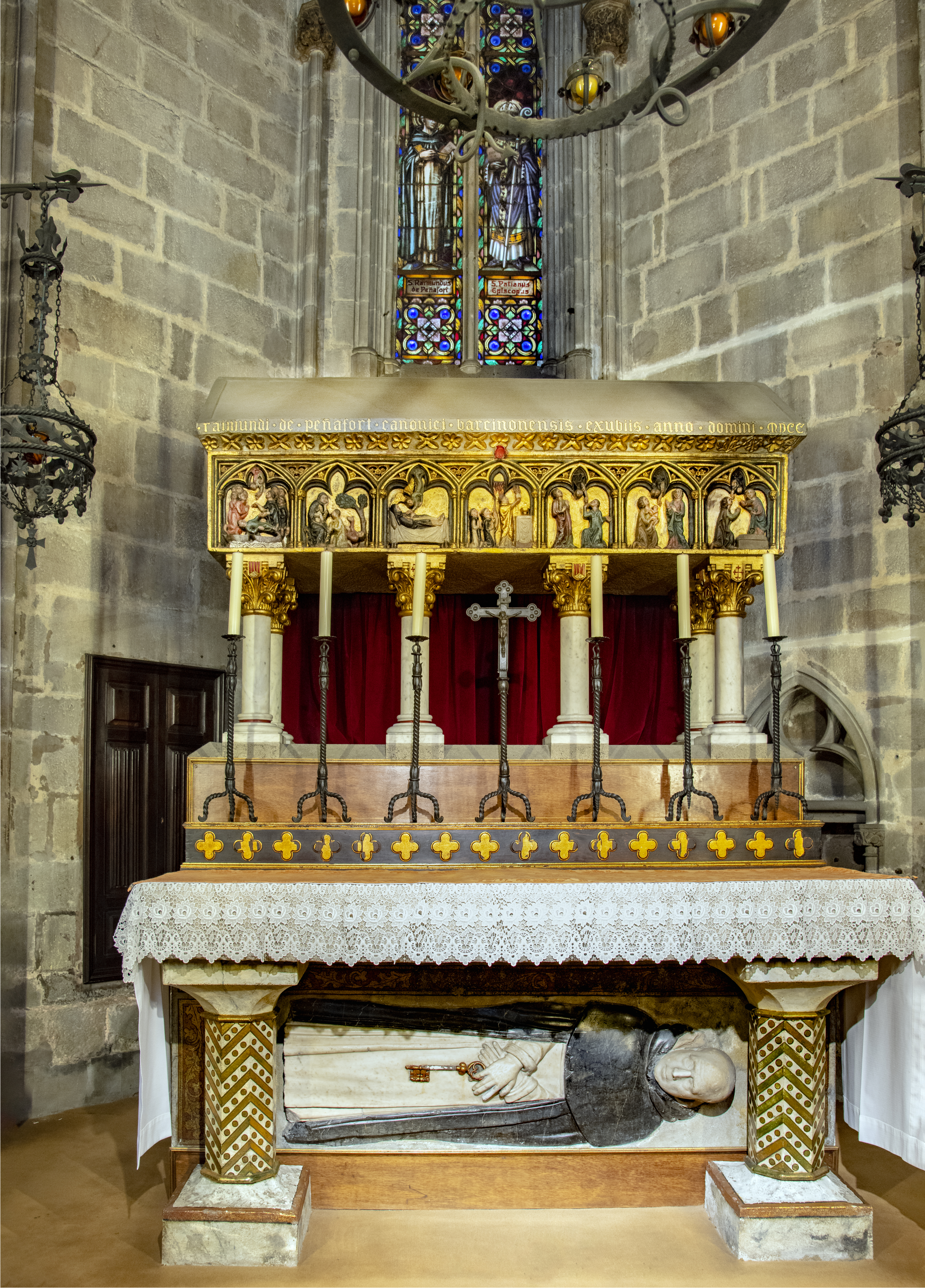
Tomb of Saint Raymond of Penyafort

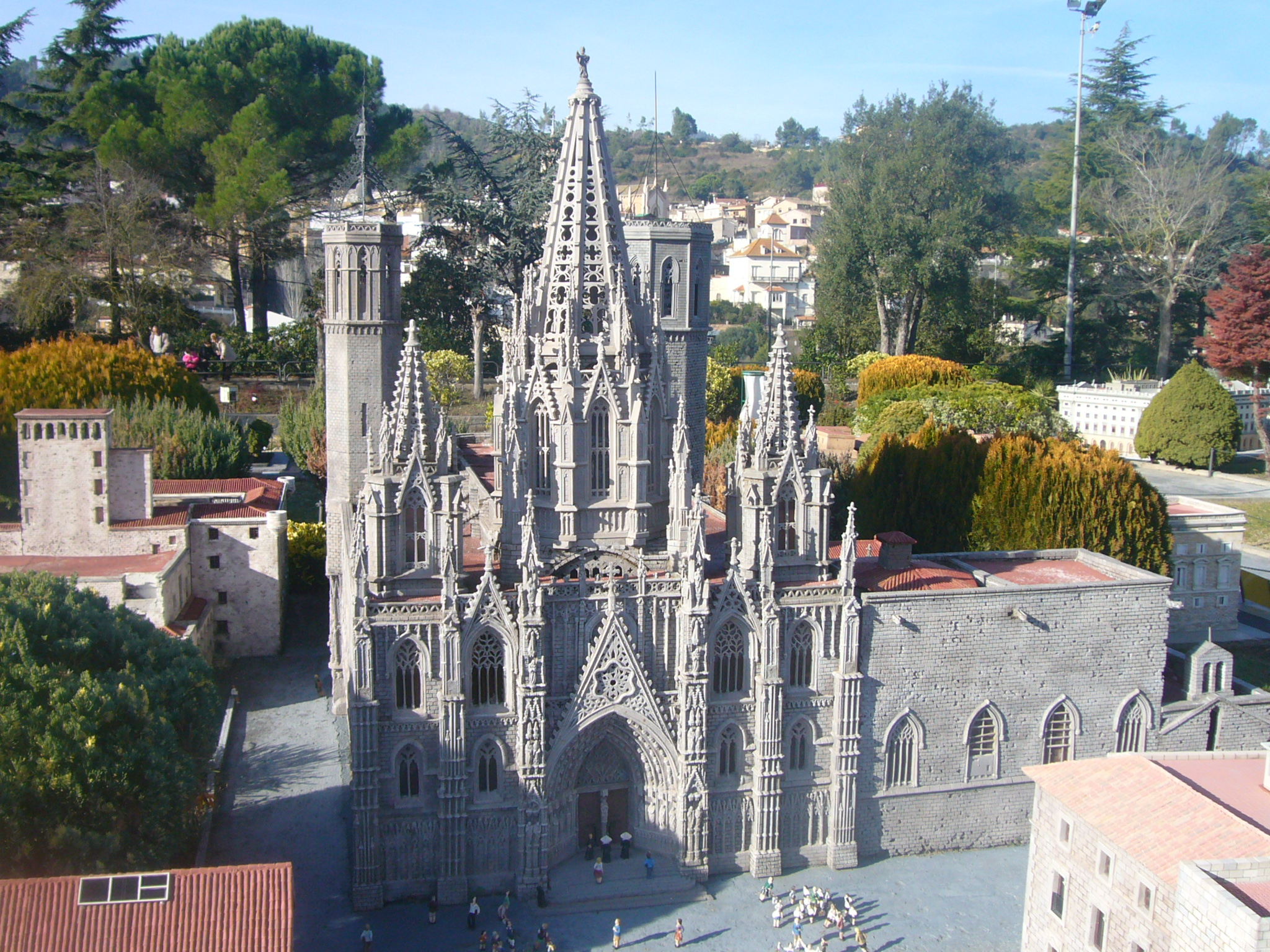
Scale model of the cathedral, at the Catalunya en Miniatura park

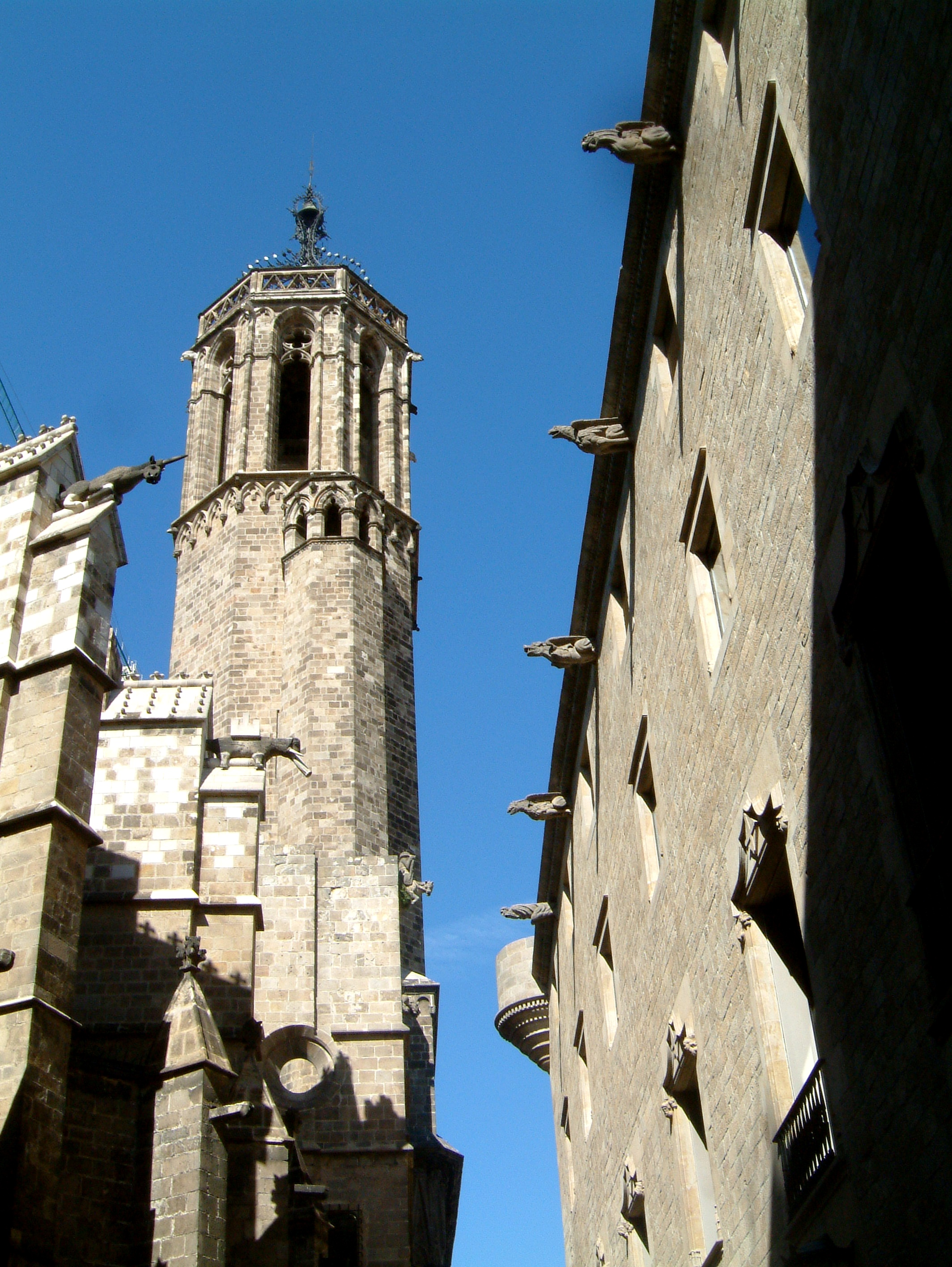
Bell tower with stair turret above the door of Saint Ivo

== See also ==
- Catholic Church in Spain
- List of Gothic Cathedrals in Europe
