= Francesc Pardo i Artigas =

Spanish bishop and theologian (1946–2022)

The Most Reverend Francesc Pardo i Artigas
- Bishop of Girona
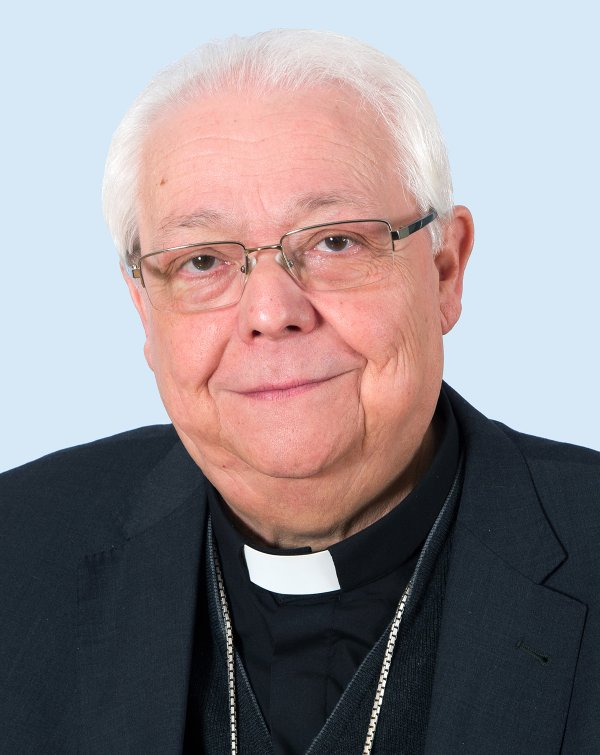
- Diocese: Girona
- Appointed: 16 July 2008
- Term ended: 31 March 2022
- Predecessor: Carlos Soler Perdigó
- Successor: Octavi Vilà Mayo

Orders
- Ordination: 31 May 1973
- Consecration: 19 October 2008 by Manuel Monteiro de Castro

Personal details
- Born: 26 June 1946 Torrelles de Foix, Spain
- Died: 31 March 2022 (aged 75) Girona, Spain
- Motto: Ut vitam habeatis
- Coat of arms

Styles of Francesc Pardo i Artigas
- Reference style: His Excellency; The Most Reverend
- Spoken style: Your Excellency
- Religious style: Bishop

Francesc Pardo i Artigas (26 June 1946 – 31 March 2022) was a Spanish Roman Catholic prelate. He was bishop of Girona from 2008 until his death.

Catholic Church titles
| Preceded by Carles Soler Perdigó | Bishop of Girona; 2008–2022 | Succeeded by Octavi Vilà Mayo |
