= Girona Cathedral =

Roman Catholic church in Girona, Catalonia, Spain

- Cathedral of Saint Mary
- Catedral de Santa Maria
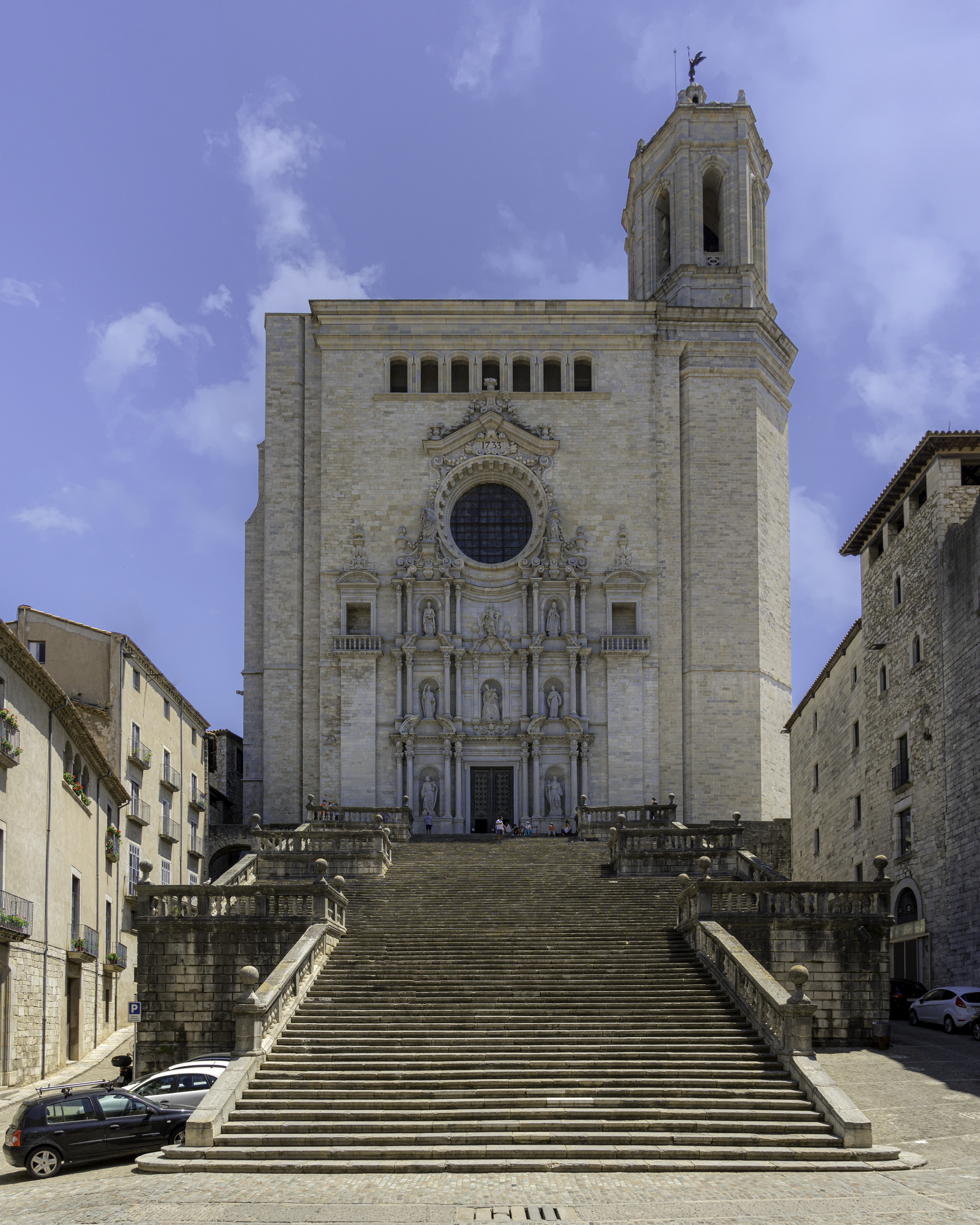
- West façade and the grand Baroque staircase
- Girona Cathedral
- 41°59′15″N 2°49′35″E
- Location: Girona, Catalonia
- Address: Plaça de la Catedral
- Country: Spain
- Denomination: Catholic
- Website: catedraldegirona.cat

History
- Status: Cathedral
- Dedication: Mary, mother of Jesus
- Dedicated: 21 September 1038

Architecture
- Style: Romanesque, Gothic, Baroque
- Groundbreaking: 1015
- Completed: 18th century

Specifications
- Length: 85 m (278 ft 10 in)
- Height: 45 m (147 ft 8 in)

Administration
- Metropolis: Tarragona
- Diocese: Girona

Clergy
- Bishop: Octavi Vilà Mayo

Spanish Cultural Heritage
- Type: Non-movable
- Criteria: Monument
- Designated: 3 June 1931
- Reference no.: RI-51-0000551

The Cathedral of Saint Mary (Catalan: Catedral de Santa Maria) is a Roman Catholic cathedral located in Girona, Catalonia, Spain. It is the seat of the Roman Catholic Diocese of Girona.

The cathedral's interior includes the widest Gothic nave in the world, with a width of 23 metres (75 ft). Its construction was begun in the 11th century in the Romanesque architectural style, and continued in the 13th century in the Gothic style. Of the original Romanesque edifice, only the 12th-century cloister and a bell tower remain.

== History ==
A primitive Christian church existed here before the Islamic conquest of Iberia, after which it was converted into a mosque, in 717. The Franks reconquered the city in 785 under Charlemagne and the church was reconsecrated in 908.

=== Romanesque cathedral ===
In 1015, the church was in poor condition. Bishop Peter Roger, son of Count Roger I of Carcassonne, restored it with the money obtained by selling the church of St. Daniel to his brother-in-law, Count Ramon Borrell of Barcelona. The church and its cloister were built until 1064, in Romanesque style. The bell tower was completed in 1117.

=== Gothic cathedral ===
The complex was redesigned by Pere Sacoma in 1312. After some years of indecisiveness, Guillem Bofill and Antoni Canet started the project in 1416. The new design consisted of a large Gothic nave, the widest Gothic nave in the world—22.98 m, and the second-widest of any church after that of St. Peter's Basilica (for comparison, the width of the nave of Reims Cathedral is 14.65 m, Saint-Étienne de Sens is 15.25 m, and 12 m in Notre Dame de Paris). The elevation in the vault is 35 metres (115 ft).

== Exterior ==
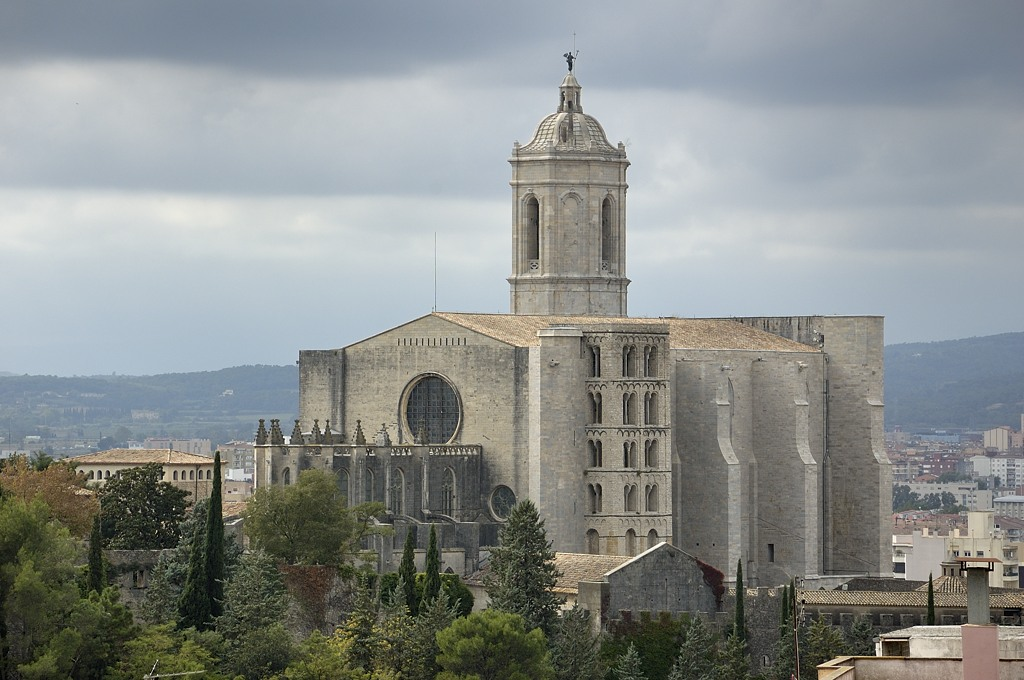
The cathedral with the lower Tower of Charlemagne, characterised by mullioned windows

The church has a Baroque main façade (begun in 1606, with the upper part finished in 1961), preceded by a large staircase completed in 1607. The sculptures decorating the three orders of the façade were executed by local sculptors in the 1960s. Other exterior features include the Gothic portal of St. Michael, on the northern façade, and the southern portico of the Apostles, from the 14th century. The latter originally featured sculptures of the Twelve Apostles, executed by Antoni Claperós in the 1460s, which have mostly been lost, aside from two depicting St. Peter and St. Paul, now in the church's chapter house.

The church has two bell towers. The oldest one, named after Charlemagne, is the surviving one of the two originally flanking the first Romanesque church (the other ceased to exist in the 14th century). Begun in the early 11th century, it has a square plan with six levels separated by friezes with Lombard bands and double mullioned windows.

== Interior ==
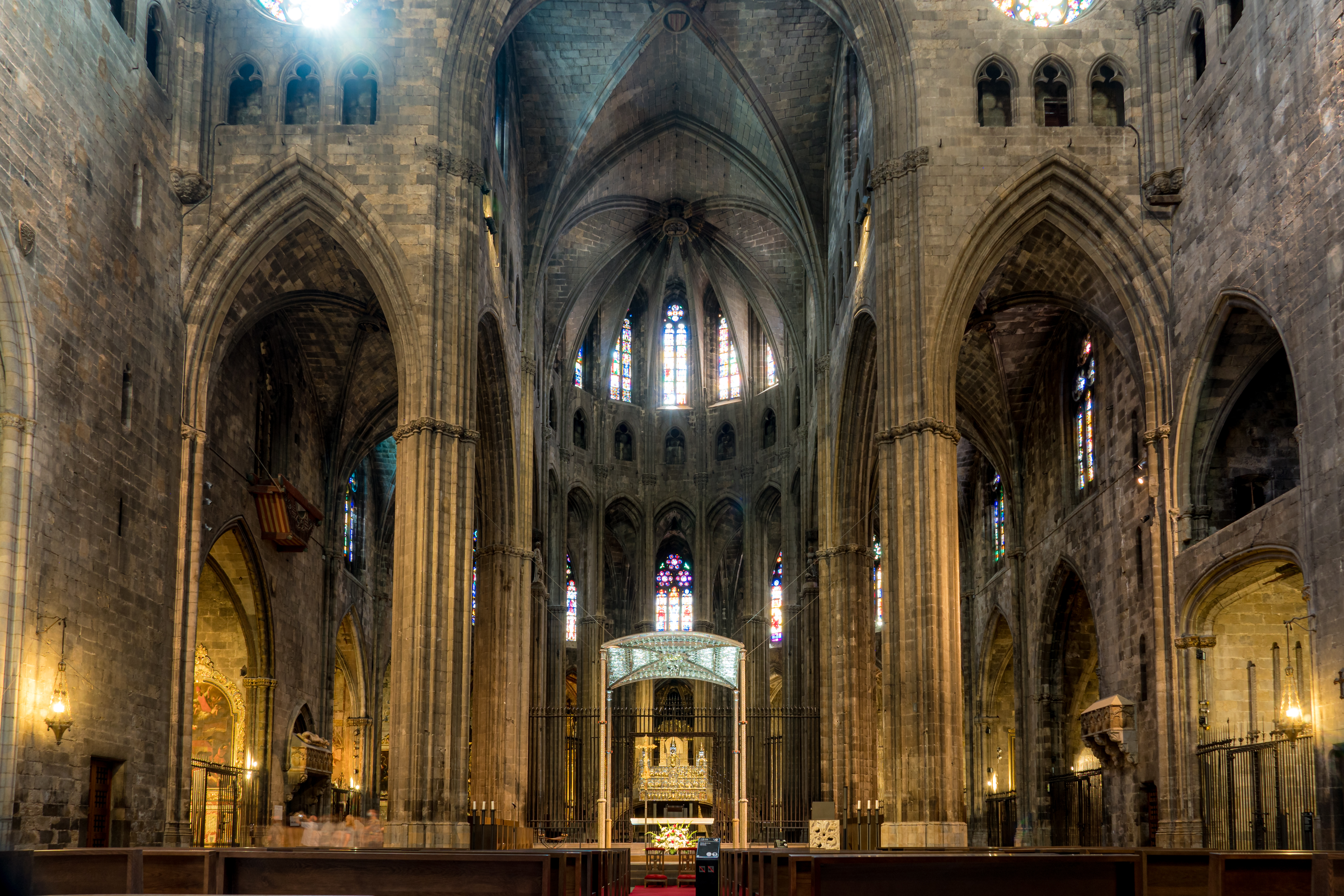
The record-wide central nave

The nave is surmounted by rib vaults, supported by Gothic buttresses. The side walls feature a triforium with pointed-arch stained glass windows. The apse is separated from the nave by a wall reaching to the vaulted ceiling and perforated with openings, namely one enormous ogive or pointed arch in the center framing the high altar, flanked by two smaller pointed arches as entrances to the ambulatory at the apse. The upper reaches of the wall bear a large central rose window (1705, dedicated to the Archangel St. Michael) flanked by two smaller ones. The polygonal apse is in turn flanked by two short galleries, with ogive or pointed arches as entrances, which correspond to the original aisles of the Romanesque building and are located at the starting point of the ambulatory. The latter is divided by piers aligned with the rays of the apse's trapezoidal vaults, forming ten radial chapels.

The high altar, in white marble, dates to the 11th century. Other artworks include the Gothic sarcophagus of Berenguer d'Anglesola (died 1418), by Pere Oller, in the chapel of Isabella of Portugal, the Chapel of All Saints (1376).

== Romanesque cloister ==
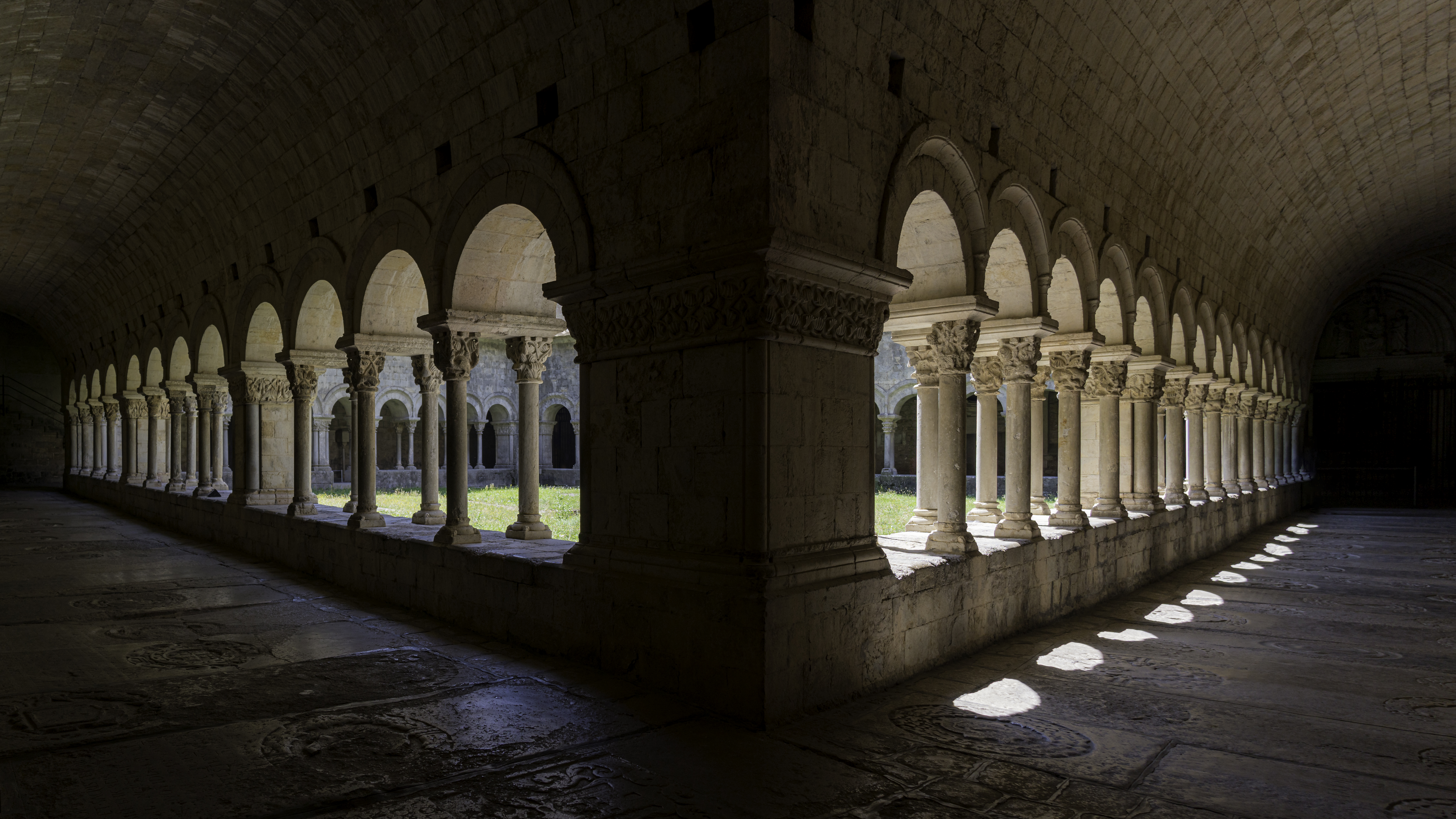
12th-century cloister

The Romanesque cloister is notable, featuring a series of columns with sculpted capitals: they depict fantastic figures and animals, and vegetable motifs. The frieze has instead scenes from the New Testament. Among the sculptors who worked at the cloister is Arnau Cadell, also author of the cloister of the Monastery of Sant Cugat. Also in the cloister is the Chapel of Our Lady of Gràcia i de Bell-Ull, which was originally a gate to the cloister, renovated in the Gothic period; its tympanum has an image of the Virgin by Master Bartomeu (13th century). The cloister's galleries are home to numerous tombs of rich members of the monastery, dating to the 14th to 18th centuries, one also by Master Bartomeu (1273).

== The Cathedral Treasury and Museum ==
The museum's main attraction is the Tapestry of Creation, an 11th- or early-12th-century piece considered amongst the master works of Romanesque tapestry.

Other artworks include:

- The Gerona Beatus, a 10th-century illuminated manuscript;
- The Casket (i.e. Box) of Caliph al-Hakam II (10th century), known to be a gift to his son Hisham II;
- A "Charlemagne" sculpture by Jaume Cascalls (1345), believed to actually portray King Peter IV of Aragon;
- A 15th-century Gothic Pietà Retable by Jaume Cabrera;
- A 16th-century Renaissance Retable of St. Mary Magdalene by Pere Mates;
- A Renaissance Saint Helen Retable by Antoni Norri and Pere Fernández;
- The theatrical Baroque bedstead for Our Lady of August (Our Lady of the Assumption), by sculptor Lluís Bonifaç i Massó (1730-1786), from Valls, and gilt by Bruno Rigalt, from Barcelona;
- The Cross of the Pearls, a 16th-century gilt silver piece with enamel plaques which bears the image of Christ crucified on the front and the image of Our Lady of the Pearls on the back, designed by Pere Joan Palau and carried out by Antoni Coll, ca. 1503.

There are also other paintings and items, ranging from Medieval to Baroque, and including processional crosses, reliquaries, monstrances, etc.

== Filming location ==
HBO filmed outdoor scenes for season 6 of its fantasy television series Game of Thrones at the cathedral and its steps. The cathedral stands in for the Great Sept house of worship, with special effects altering parts of the building and the steps, in two episodes of season 6, "Blood of My Blood" and "The Winds of Winter".

== Gallery ==
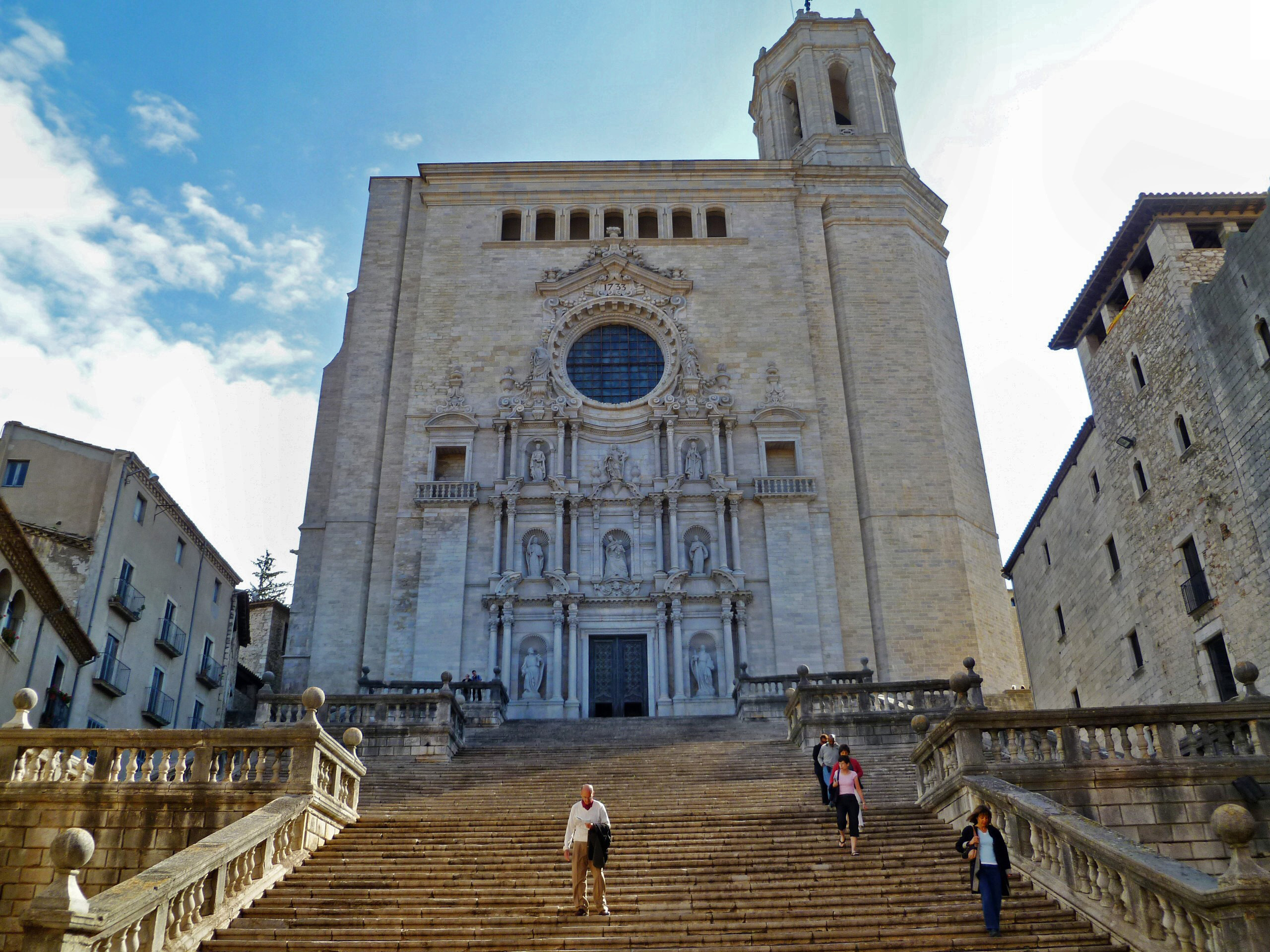
Main façade and grand staircase (Baroque)

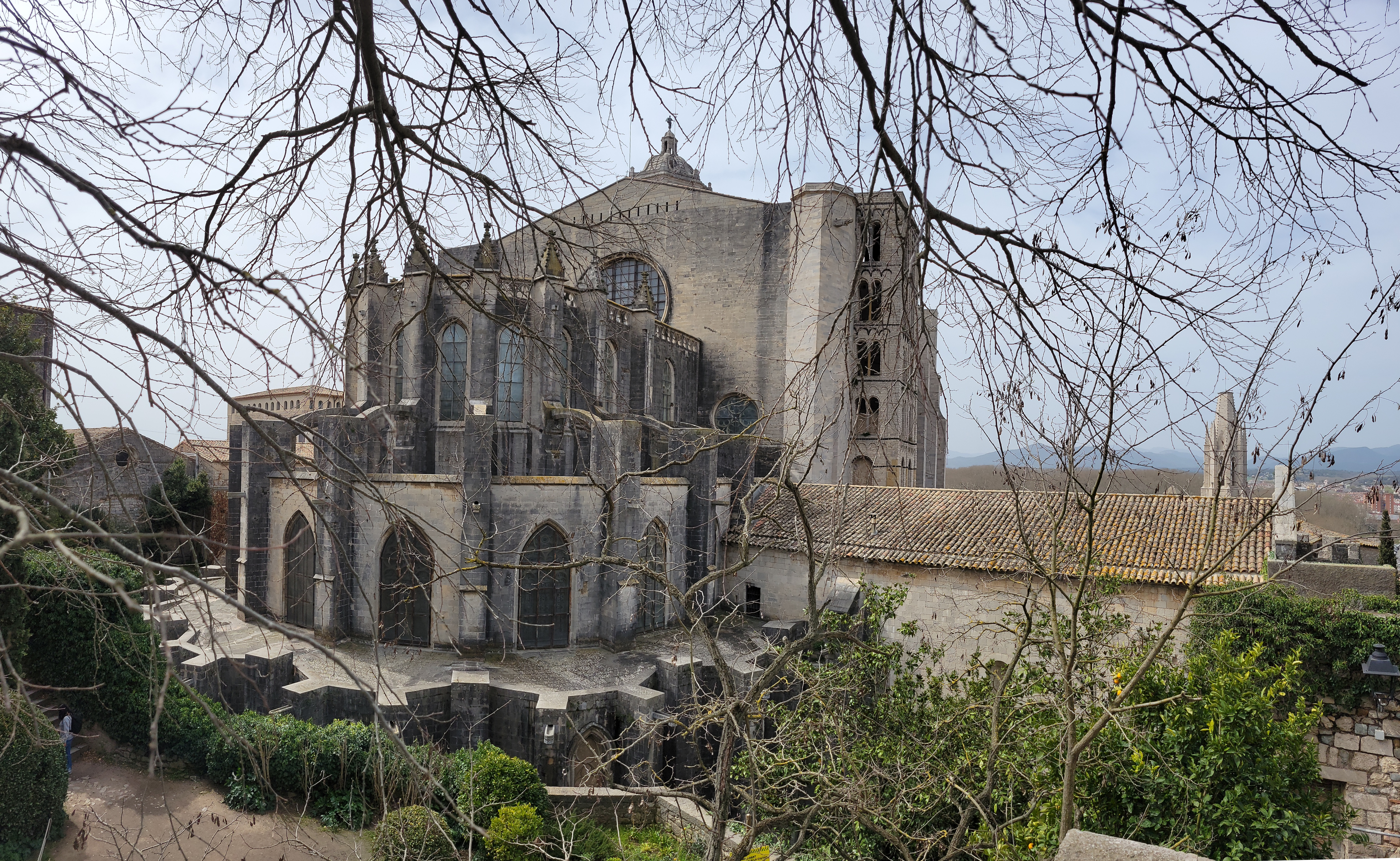
Rear. The Charlemagne bell tower, dating to the 11th century, can be seen along the right side of the cathedral.

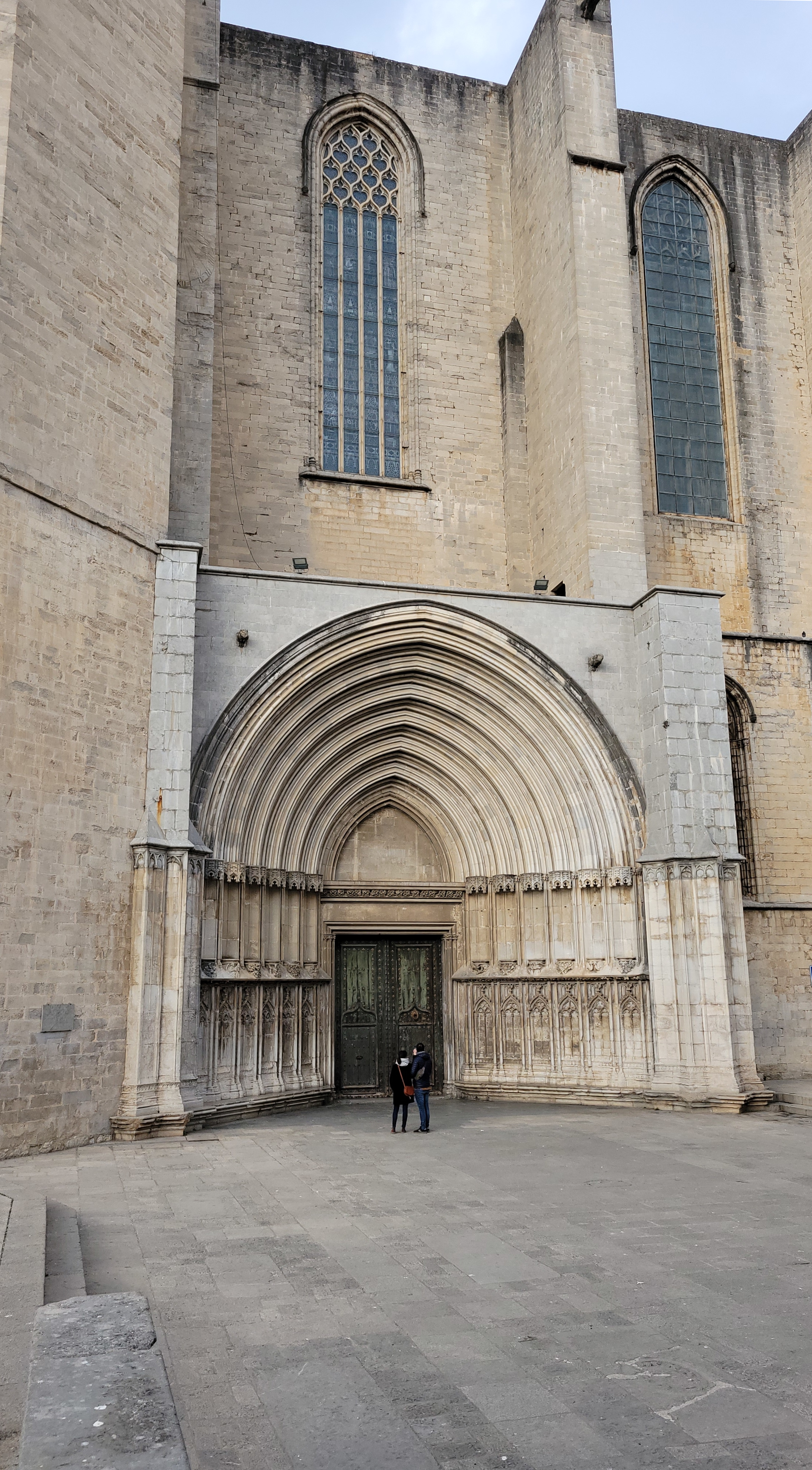
The southern portico of the Apostles (Apostles missing)

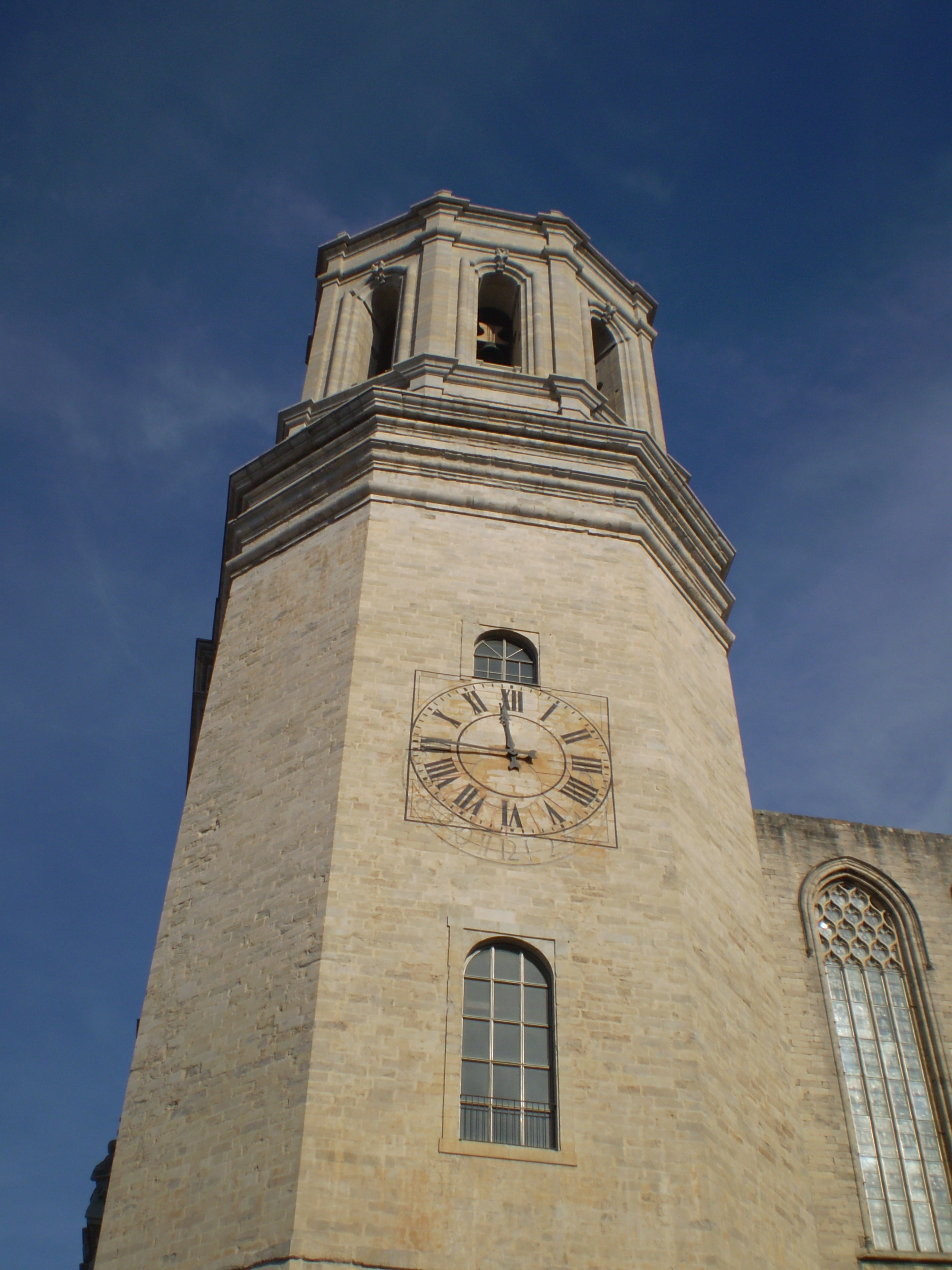
The 18th-century bell tower

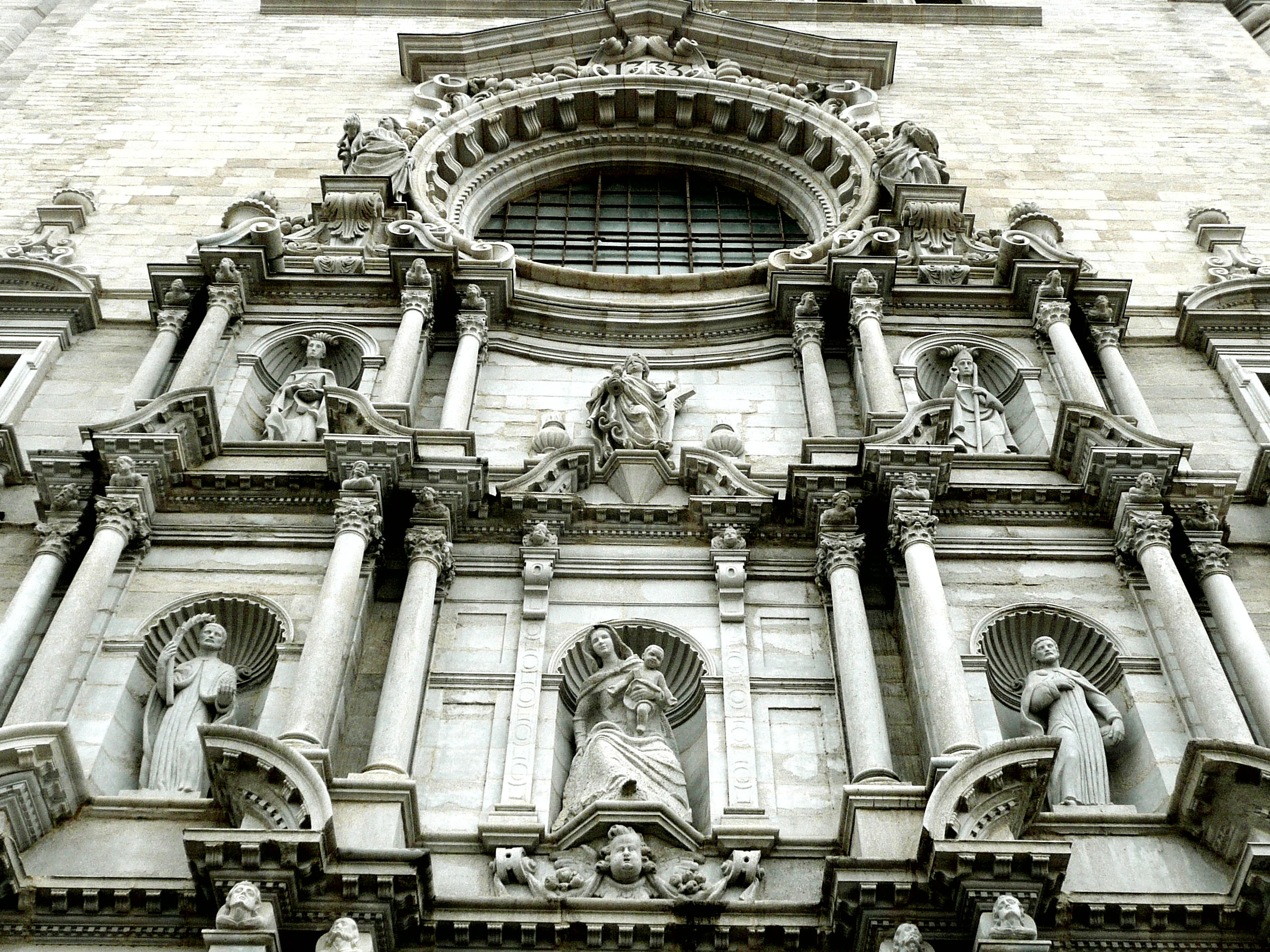
Close-up of the façade, raked perspective

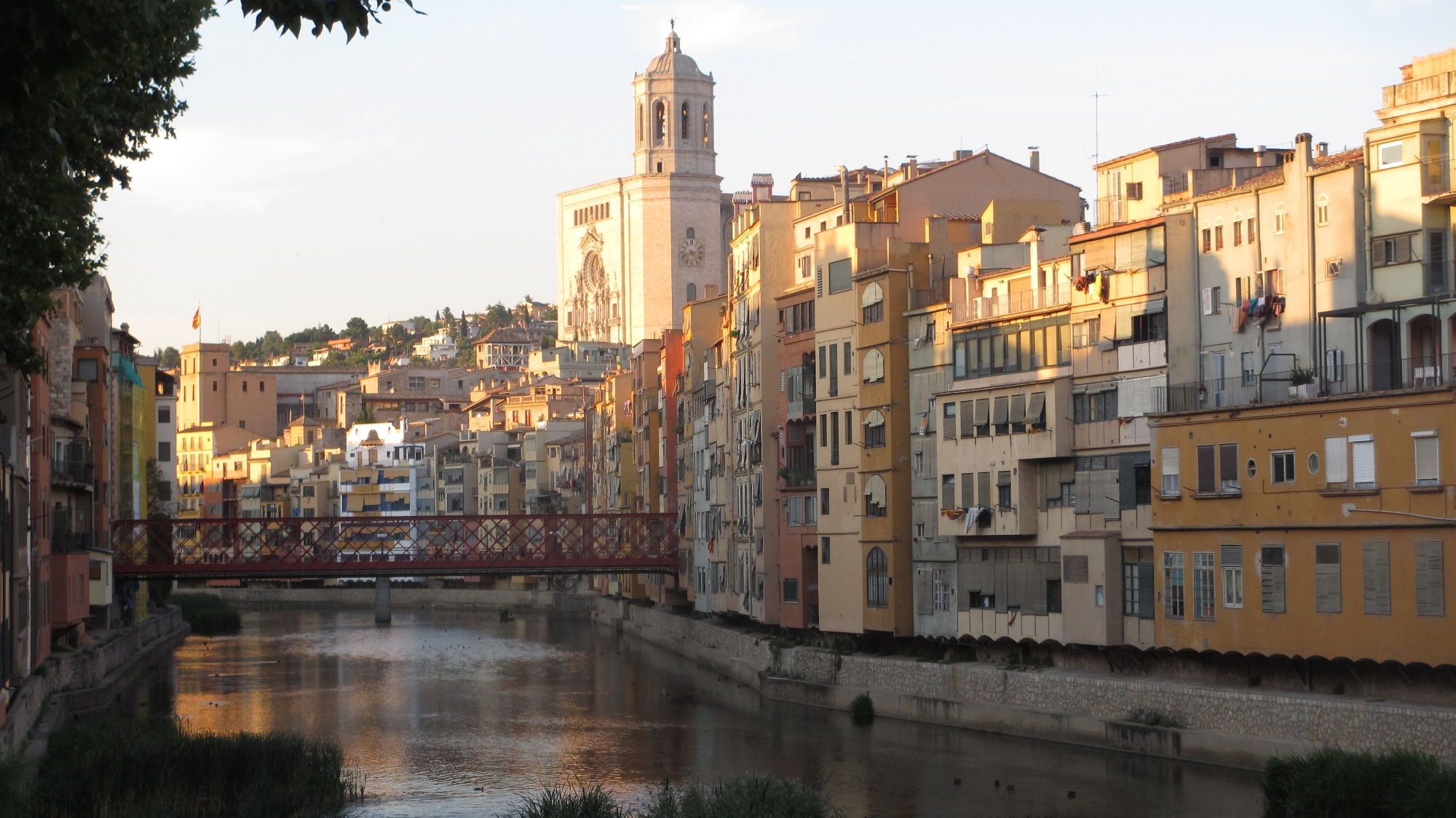
View of the cathedral, with the Eiffel Bridge over the Onyar in the foreground

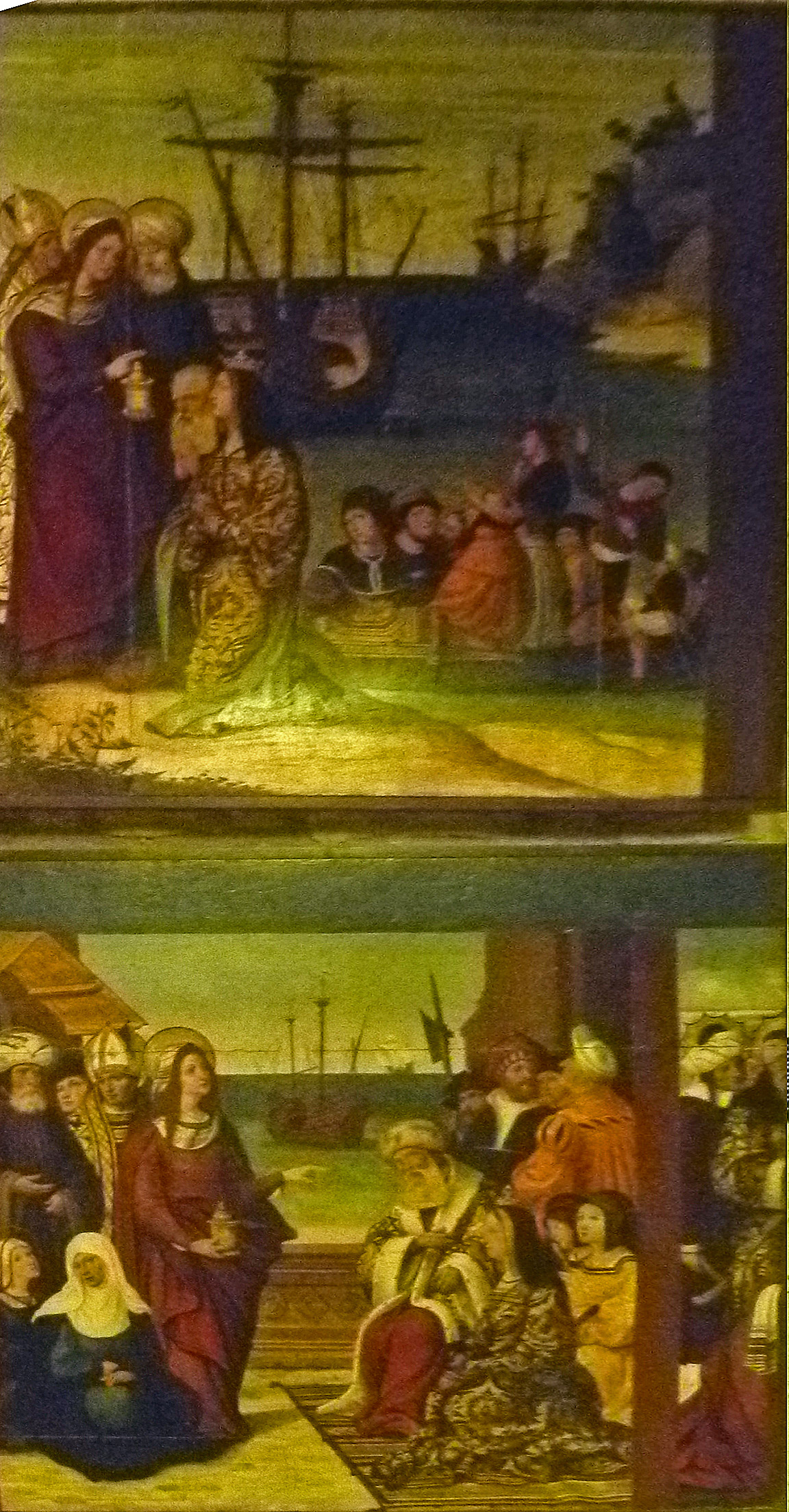
Retable of Saint Mary Magdalene, by Pere Mates (Renaissance)

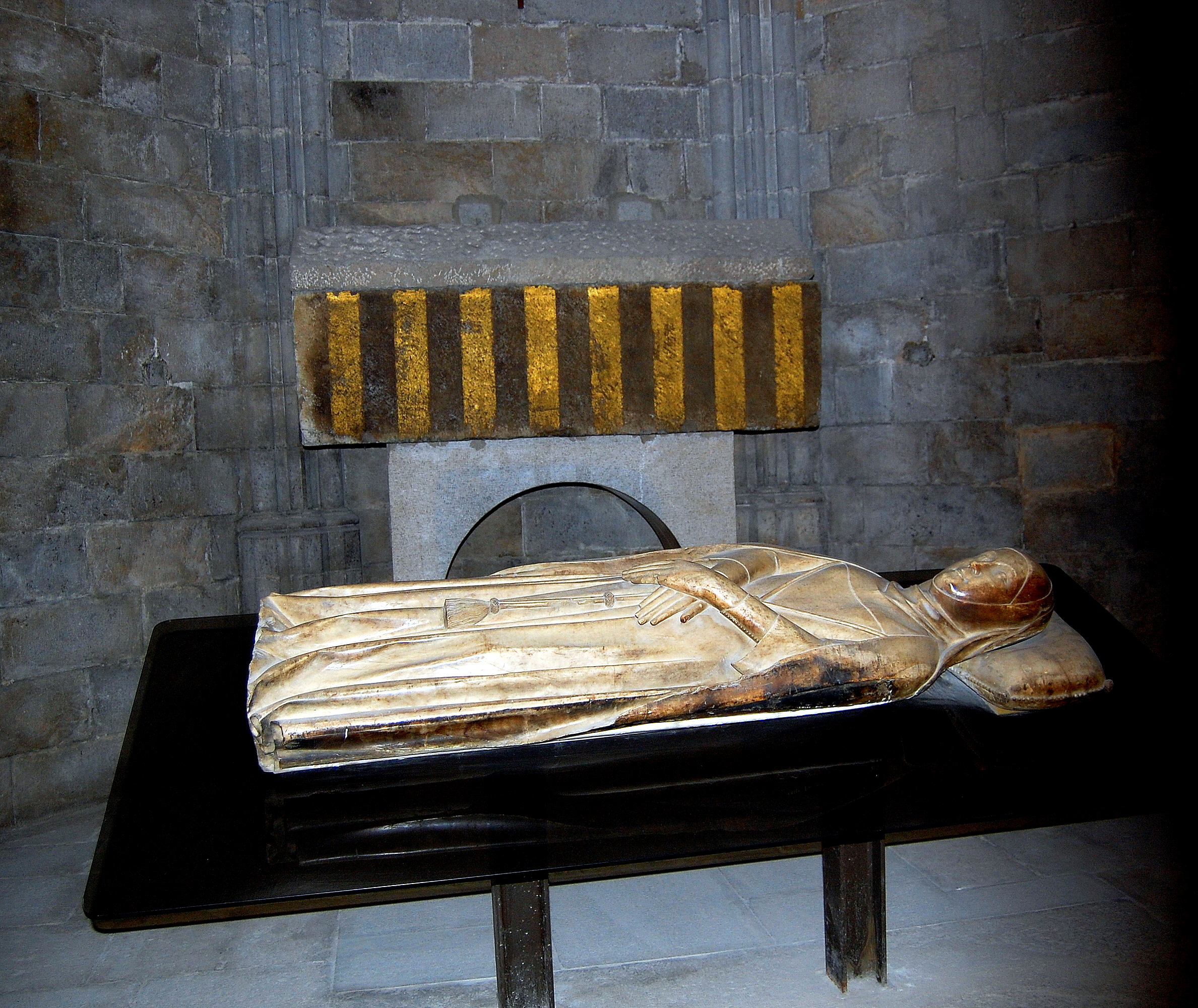
Sculpture of Countess Ermessenda of Carcassonne, by Guillem Morell (ca. 1385), originally on her Gothic sarcophagus

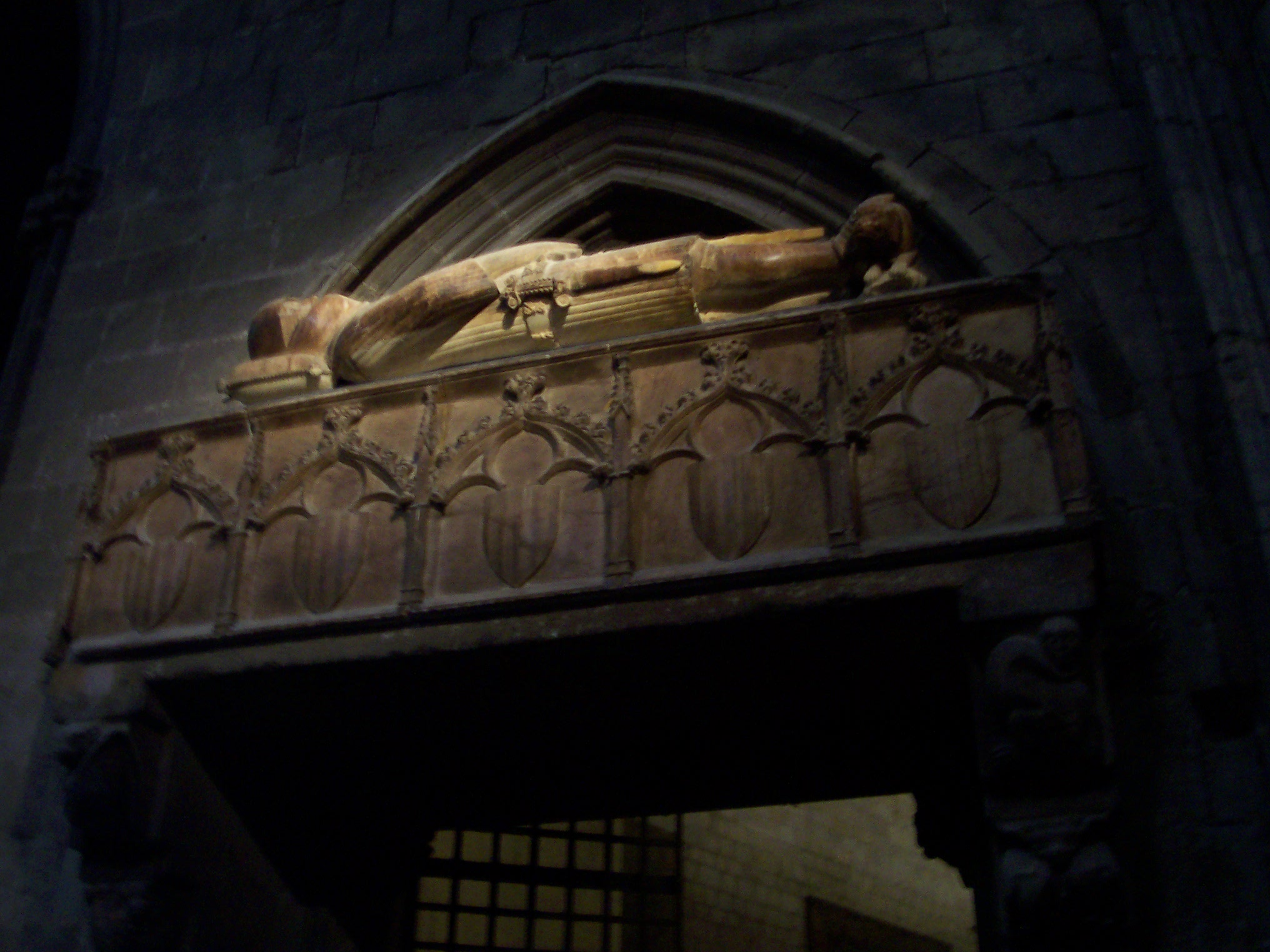
Sarcophagus of Count Ramon Berenguer II, by Guillem Morell (ca. 1385)

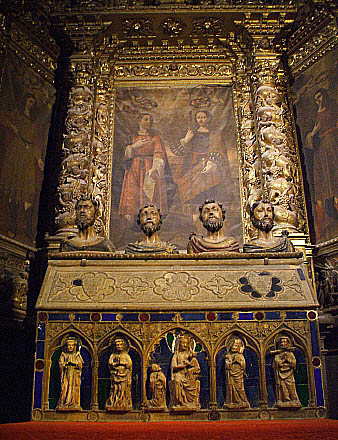
Chapel of the Holy Martyrs, with a stone 14th-century Gothic Casket of the Holy Martyrs of Girona in the foreground (the 4 busts on it date from 1659), and a Baroque retable from 1679 in the background

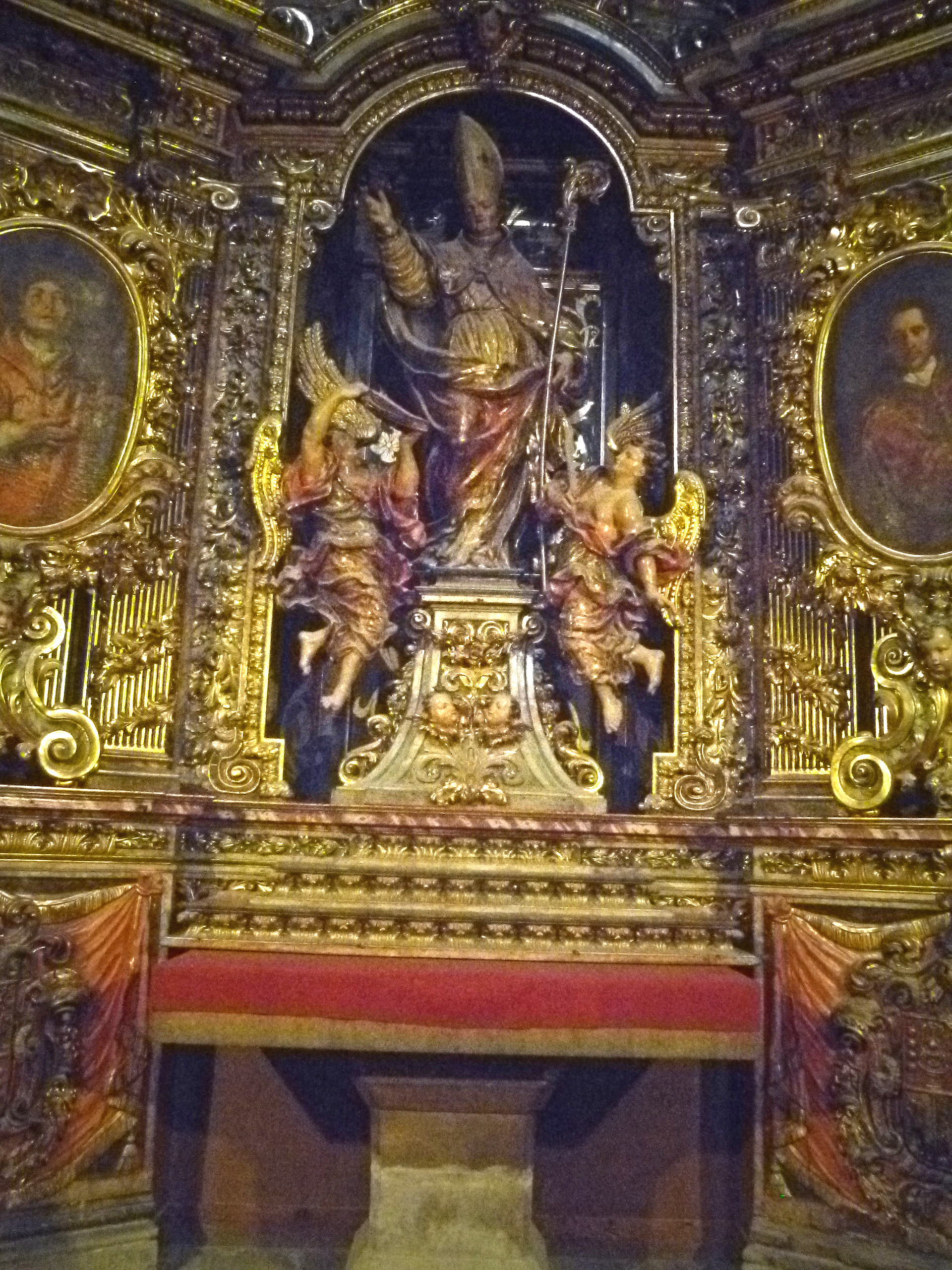
Chapel of Saint Andrew

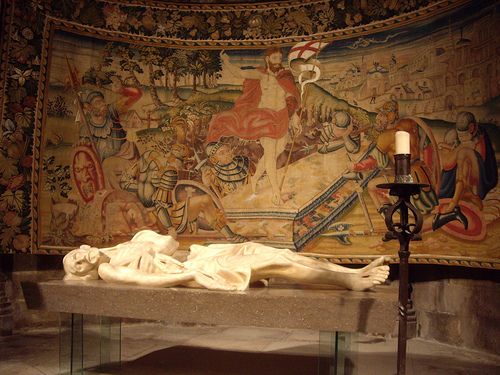
Christ recumbent (1958), by Domènec Fita i Molat, and Tapestry of the Resurrection (1560)

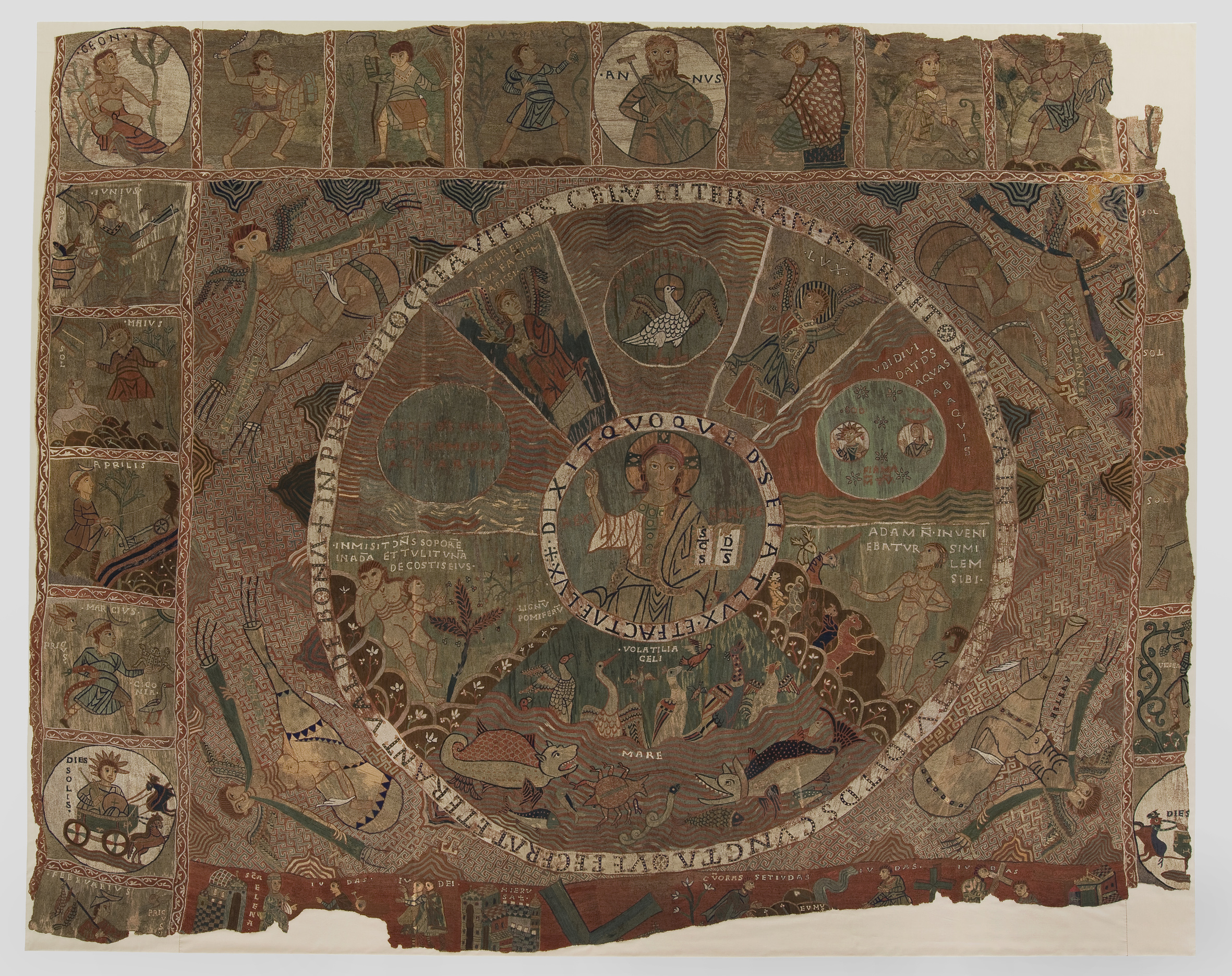
Tapestry of Creation, Cathedral Museum

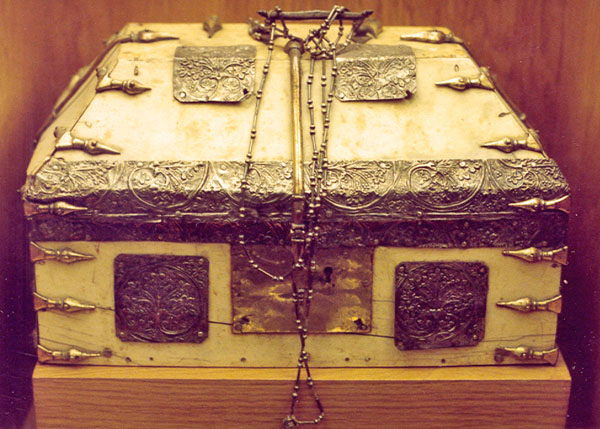
Ivory casket, Cathedral Museum

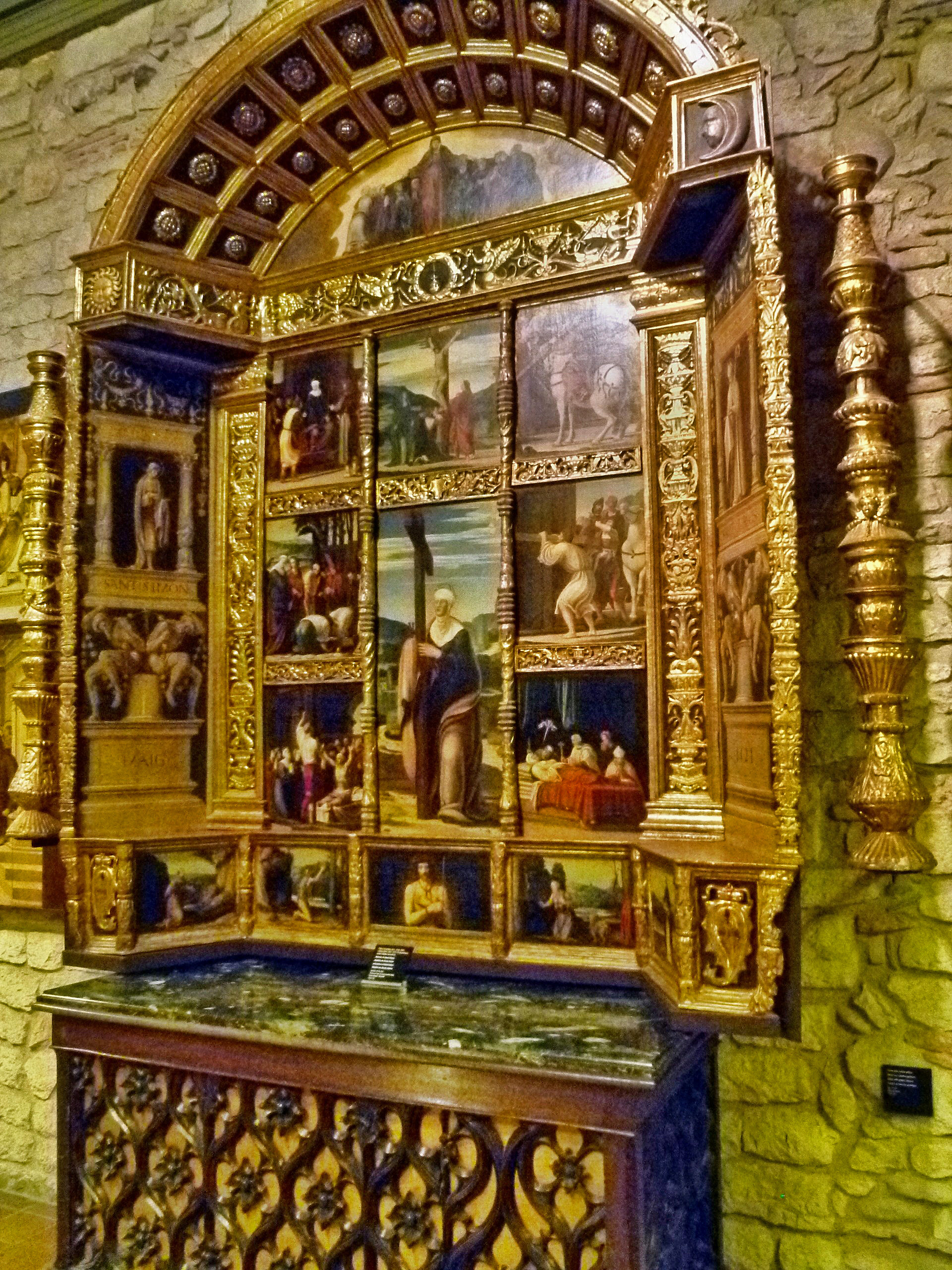
St. Helen Altarpiece, Cathedral Museum

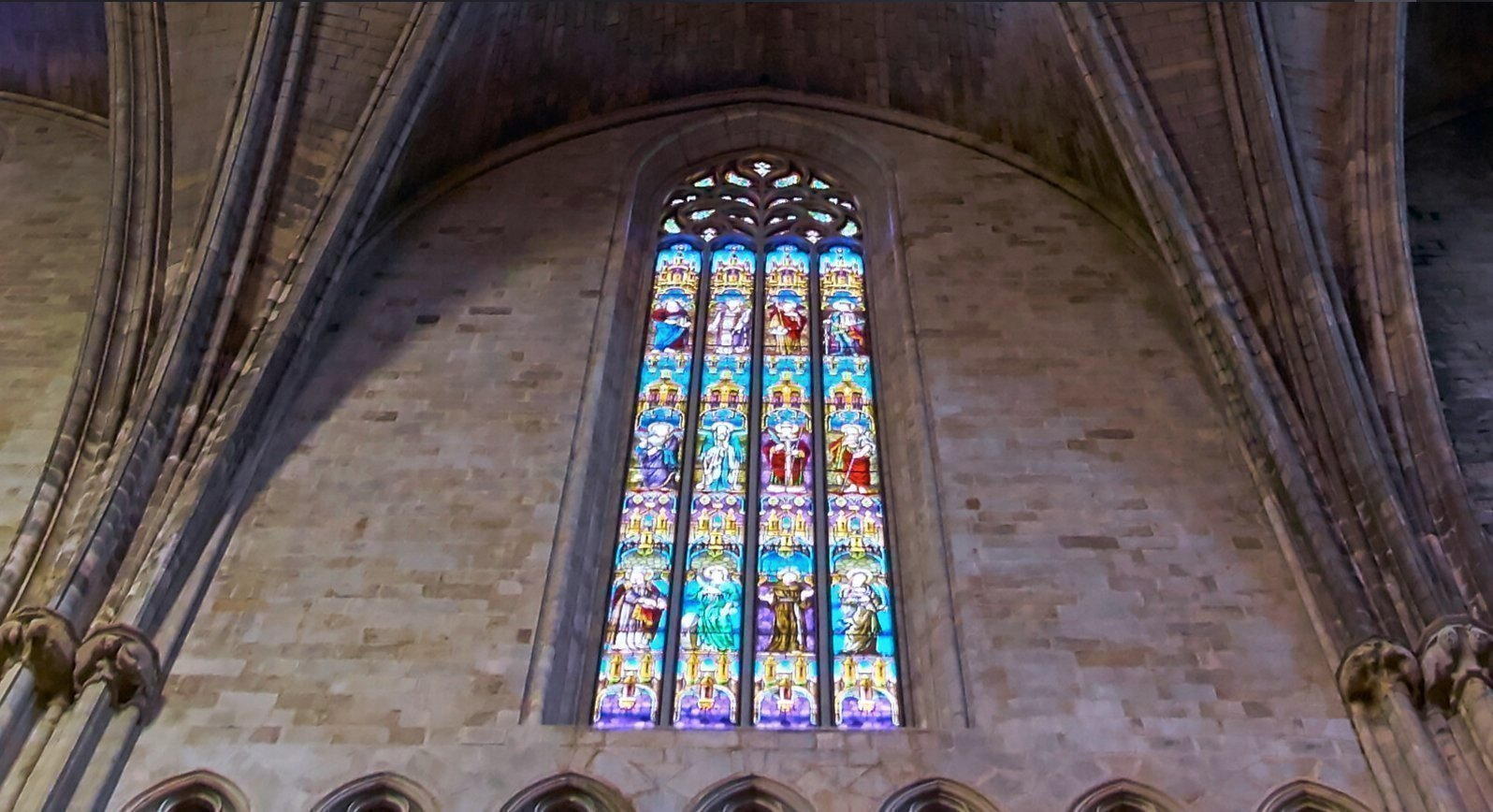
One of the tall stained glass windows on the north side is 14m high and 3m wide

Plan of the church
