= Pere Oller =

Catalan Gothic sculptor

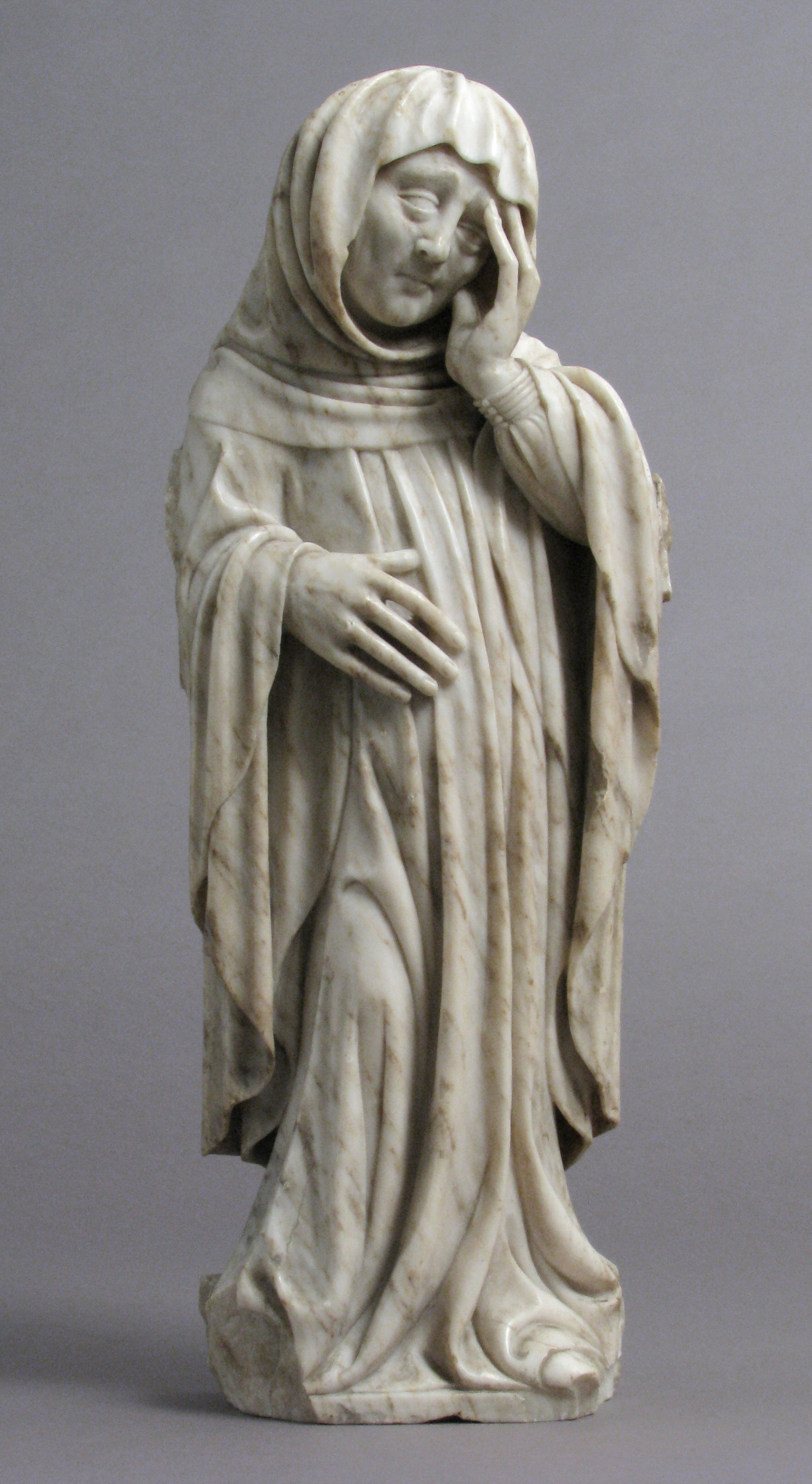
Statue of a mourner from the tomb of Ferdinand I of Aragon, Metropolitan Museum of Art, c.1417

Pere Oller (fl. 1394 – 1442) was a Catalan Gothic sculptor.

From 1395 to 1399 he served as an apprentice on the choir of Barcelona Cathedral. He then relocated to Girona, where the keystone of a vault from the chapel of Pia Almoina is attributed to him, as well as the tomb of Bishop Berenguer de Anglesola in the Girona Cathedral. Other works thought to be his include the tomb of Pere Roure (died 1413) in Saint Vicente, Besal.

A letter of King Alfonso V of Aragon (1416–58) to the Abbot of Poblet, dated 21 January 1417 states that Oller was commissioned to create the tomb of King Ferdinand I of Aragon (reg 1412-16), Alfonso's father, at the Poblet Monastery. The tomb itself is no longer extant, but some fragments survive. The Metropolitan Museum of Art in New York City has a sculpture of a mourner by Oller, from Ferdinand's tomb as does the Loyola University Museum of Art in Chicago.

Also attributed to him are the tomb of Bishop Berenguer de Anglesola, in the Girona Cathedral and the chapel of Sancha Ximenis de Cabrera in the Cathedral of Santa Eulalia.
