= Diocese of Girona =

Roman Catholic diocese in Spain

Coordinates: 41°59′15″N 2°49′33″E

Diocese of Girona Dioecesis Gerundensis Diòcesi de Girona (ca) Diócesis de Gerona (es)

Catholic
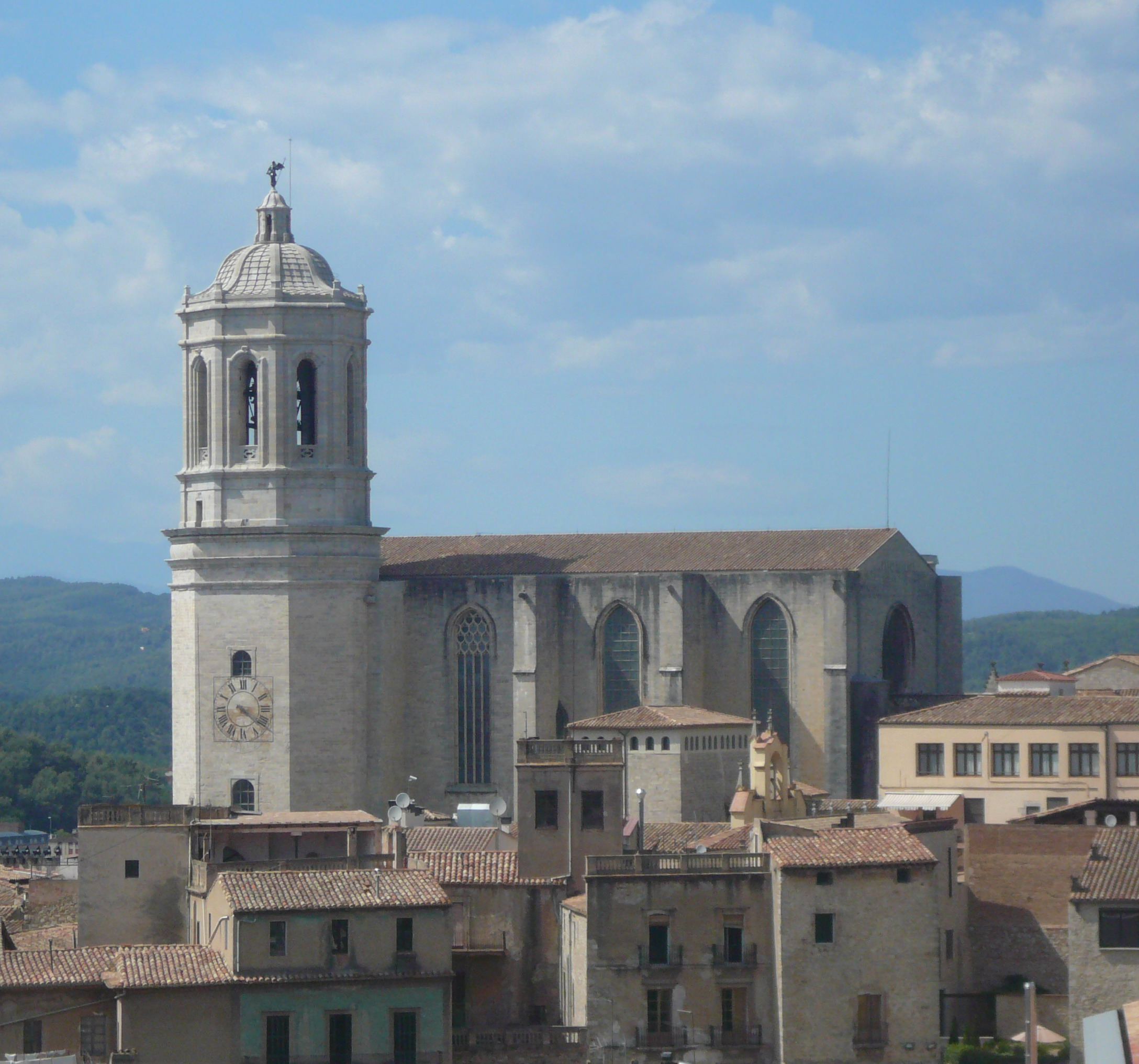
- Girona Cathedral

- Coat of arms

Location
- Country: Spain
- Ecclesiastical province: Tarragona
- Metropolitan: Tarragona

Statistics
- Area: 4,705 km^{2} (1,817 sq mi)
- Population: Total; Catholics: (as of 2006); 740,214; 630,000 (85.1%)

Information
- Denomination: Roman Catholic
- Rite: Latin Rite
- Established: 4th Century
- Cathedral: Cathedral of Mary Mother of God in Girona

Current leadership
- Pope: Leo XIV
- Bishop: Octavi Vilà Mayo
- Metropolitan Archbishop: Joan Planellas i Barnosell

Map
- Colored map of the diocese of Girona. The different colors show the limits of arxiprestats that the diocese was divided in 2011. Some neighboring towns may be assigned to different parishes, arxiprestats or even to another diocese.

Website
- Website of the Diocese

The Diocese of Girona (Latin: Dioecesis Gerundensis) is a Latin Church diocese of the Catholic Church located in the city of Girona in the ecclesiastical province of Tarragona in Catalonia, Spain.

== History ==
The first historical mention of a Christian diocese in Girona is in a paper for Pope Innocent I in 397–400. On 18 June, 517, a synod convened here was attended by the Archbishop of Tarragona and six bishops; canons were promulgated dealing with the recitation of the Divine Office, infant baptism and the celibacy of the clergy.

About 885 Bishop Ingobert of Urgell was expelled from his see by the intruder Selva, who, under the protection of the Count of Urgell, was consecrated in Gascony. This usurper also unlawfully placed Hermemiro over the see of Girona. In 892 a synod was held in the Church of Santa Maria in Urgell; the two usurpers were deposed, their vestments rent, their crosiers broken over their heads, and they were deprived of their sacerdotal faculties.

A council held in Lleida in 1246 absolved James I of Aragon from the sacrilege of cutting out the tongue of the Bishop of Girona. Another synod at Girona in 1078 affirmed the nullity of simoniacal ordinations.

Honoured with papal prerogatives relating to the pilgrim routes to Santiago de Compostela, the Church of Le Puy assumed a sort of informal primacy in respect to most of the Churches of France, and even of Christendom, manifesting itself practically in a 'right to beg', established with the authorization of the Holy See, in virtue of which the chapter of Le Puy levied a veritable tax upon almost all the Christian countries to support its hospital of Notre-Dame. In Catalonia this droit de quête, recognized by Spanish Crown, was so thoroughly established that the chapter had its collectors permanently installed in that country.

A famous "fraternity" existed between the chapter of Le Puy and that of Girona in Catalonia. The earliest document in which it is mentioned dates only from 1470, and it involves that at this date the chapter of Girona, in order to escape the financial thraldom which bound it, like many Catalan Churches, to the chapter of Le Puy, alleged its "fraternity" involving its equality—with the Church of Le Puy. In 1479 and in 1481 Pierre Bouvier, a canon of Le Puy, came to Girona, where the canons invoked against him a legend according to which Charlemagne had taken Girona, rebuilt its cathedral, given it a canon of Le Puy for a bishop, and established a fraternity between chapters of Girona and Le Puy. Based on this legend they appealed to the liturgical Office which they chanted for the feast of Charlemagne—an Office, dating from 1345, but in which they had recently inserted these tales of the Church of LePuy. In 1484 Sixtus IV prohibited the use of this Office, whereupon there appeared at Girona the "Tractatus de captione Gerunde", reaffirming the Girona legend about the fraternity with Le Puy.

Down to the last days of the old regime the two chapters frequently exchanged courtesies; canons of Le Puy passing through Girona and canons of Girona passing through Le Puy enjoyed special privileges. In 1883 the removal by the Bishop of Girona of the statue of Charlemagne from that cathedral marked the definitive collapse of the whole fabric of legends out of which the hermandad (brotherhood) between Le Puy and Girona had grown.

On April 10, 1992 the diocese was renamed as Diocese of Girona.

== Special churches ==
- Minor Basilicas:
  - Basílica de Santa Maria, Castelló d’Empúries, Catalonia
  - Basílica de Sant Feliu, Girona, Catalonia

== Leadership ==
- Bishops of Girona (Roman rite)
- Miró Bonfill (970–984 Died)

. . .

- Berenguer de Llers (1147–1160 Died)

. . .

- Gilberto Cruilles (1334–1335 Died)

. . .

- Berenguer Cruilles (1348–1362 Died)
- Íñigo Vallterra Sánchez de Heredia (1362–1369 Appointed, Bishop of Segorbe-Albarracin)

. . .

- Berenguer de Anglesola (1384–1408 Died)

. . .

- Dalmacio del Mur (1415–1419 Appointed, Archbishop of Tarragona)
- Andrés de Bertrán (1419–1431 Appointed, Bishop of Barcelona)
- Juan Casanova (1431–1436 Died)
- Bernardo de Pau (1436–1457 Died)
- Rodrigo de Borja (1457–1458 Appointed, Administrator of Valencia)
- Cosme de Montserrat (1458–1459 Appointed, Bishop of Vic)
- Jaume Francesco de Cardona i de Aragón (1459–1461 Appointed, Bishop of Urgell)
- Juan Margarit i Pau (1461–1484 Died)
- Berenguer de Pau (1486–1506 Died)
- Juan de Espés (1507–1508 Resigned)
- Guillermo Raimundo Boil, O.S.H. (1508–1532 Died)
- Juan Margarit (bishop) (1534–1554 Died)
- Gonzalo Arias Gallego (1556–1565 Appointed, Bishop of Cartagena (en España))
- Pedro Carlos, O.S. (1565–1572 Died)
- Benito Tocco, O.S.B. (1572–1583 Appointed, Bishop of Lerida)
- Jaime Casador (1583–1597 Died)
- Francisco Arévalo de Zuaco (1598–1611 Died)
- Onofre Reart (1611–1621 Resigned)
- Pedro Moncada (1620–1621 Died)
- Francesc Senjust, O.S.B. (1622–1627 Died)
- García Gil Manrique (1627–1633 Appointed, Bishop of Barcelona)
- Gregorio Parcero de Castro, O.S.B. (1633–1655 Appointed, Bishop of Tortosa)
- Bernardo Cardona (1656–1658 Died)
- Francisco Pijoan (1659–1660 Died)
- José Fageda, O.S.H. (1660–1664 Appointed, Bishop of Tortosa)
- José Ninot y Bardera (1664–1668 Appointed, Bishop of Lerida)
- Alonso Francisco Dou (1668–1673 Died)
- Alfonso de Balmaseda, O.S.A. (1673–1679 Confirmed, Bishop of Zamora)
- Severo Tomás Auter, O.P. (1679–1686 Confirmed, Bishop of Tortosa)
- Miguel Pontich, O.F.M. (1686–1699 Died)
- Miguel Juan de Taverner y Rubí (1699–1720 Appointed, Archbishop of Tarragona)
- José Taberner (Taverner) Dárdena (1720–1726 Died)
- Pedro Copóns Copóns (1726–1728 Appointed, Archbishop of Tarragona)
- Baltasar Bastero Lladó (1728–1745 Resigned)
- Lorenzo Taranco Mujaurrieta (1745–1756 Died)
- Manuel Antonio Palmero y Rallo (1756–1774 Died)
- Tomás Lorenzana Butrón (1775–1796 Died)
- Santiago Pérez Arenillas (1796–1797 Died)
- Juan Agapito Ramírez Arellano (1798–1810 Died)
- Pedro Valero (1815–1815 Died)
- Antonio Allué y Sesse (1817–1818 Resigned)
- Juan Miguel Pérez González (1819–1824 Died)
- Dionisio Castaño y Bermúdez (1825–1834 Died)
- Florencio Llorente y Montón (1847–1862 Died)
- Constantino Bonet y Zanuy (1862–1875 Confirmed, Archbishop of Tarragona)
- Isidoro Valls y Pascual (1875–1877 Died)
- Tomás Sivilla y Gener (1877–1906 Died)
- Francisco de Pol y Baralt (1906–1914 Died)
- Francisco de Paula Mas y Oliver (1915–1920 Died)
- Gabriel Llompart y Jaume Santandreu (1922–1925 Appointed, Bishop of Mallorca)
- José Vila y Martínez (1925–1932 Died)
- José Cartaña y Inglés (1933–1963 Died)
- Narcís Jubany Arnau (1964–1971 Appointed, Bishop of Barcelona)
- Jaume Camprodon i Rovira (1973–2001 Retired)
- Carles Soler Perdigó (2001–2008 Retired)
- Francesc Pardo i Artigas (2008–2022 Died)
- Octavi Vilà Mayo (2024-2026)

== See also ==
- Roman Catholicism in Spain

== Sources ==
- Catholic Hierarchy
- Diocese website (in Catalan)
