= Tapestry of Creation =

11th-century needlework panel in Girona, Spain

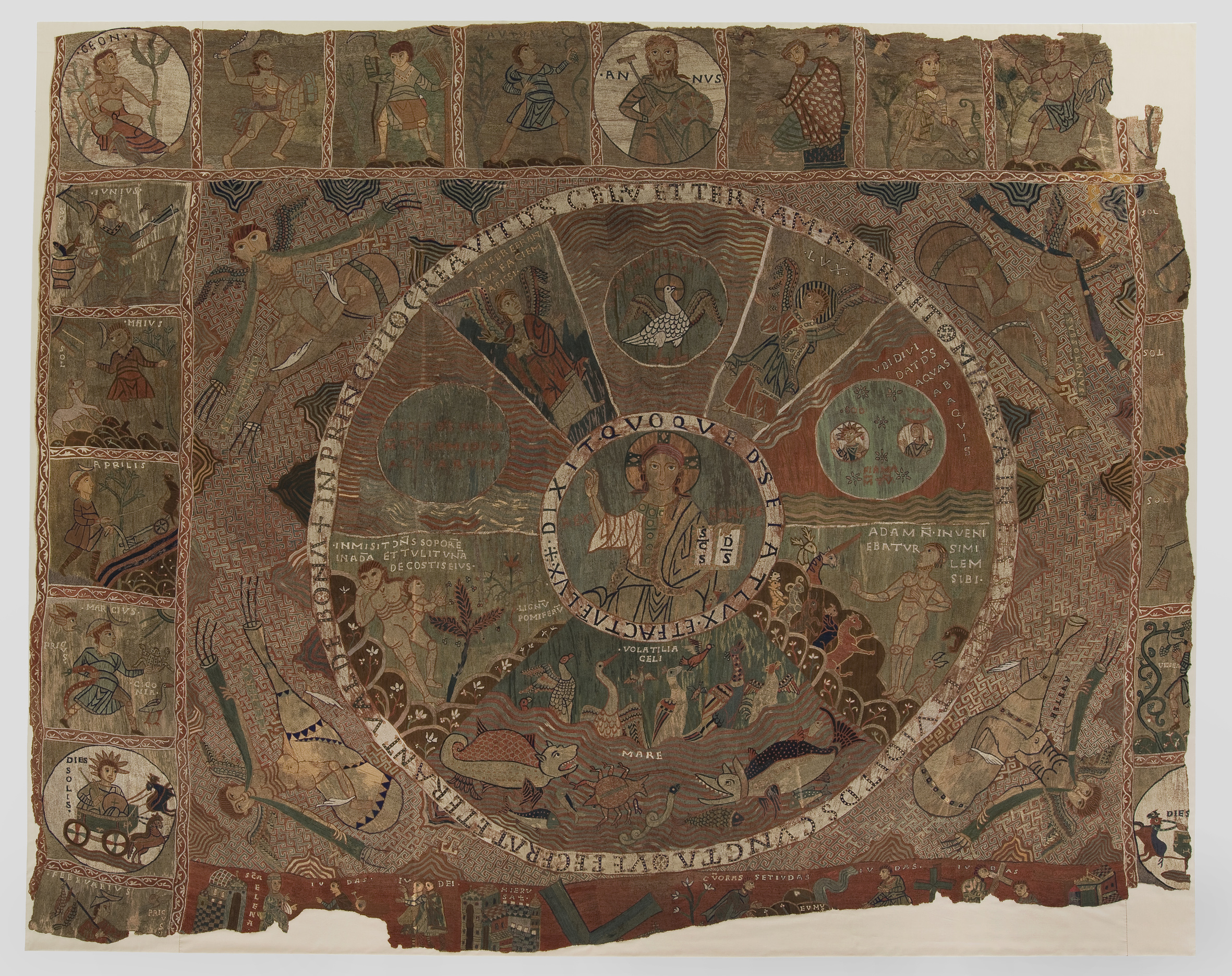
- Year: 11th Century
- Dimensions: 470 cm × 365 cm (185 in × 143.7 in)
- Location: Cathedral of Girona, Girona

The Tapestry of Creation or Girona Tapestry is a Romanesque panel of needlework from the 11th century, housed in the Museum of the Cathedral of Girona, Catalonia, Spain. Measuring 3.65 m × 4.70 m (12.0 ft × 15.4 ft) of wool and linen, contemporary scholars are still debating its patronage and intended function in the Church. It is organized in concentric circles surrounded by a border depicting a series of theological scenes related with the Christian creation myth as well as a description of the yearly calendar. The righthand border and bottom third of the fabric is lost, but it is believed that the missing sections held a continuation of the months as well as a space describing the discovery of the True Cross.

== Production ==
The "tapestry" is actually a panel of woolen couched needlework laid down on the surface of a terracotta woolen chevron ground fabric. Manuel Castiñeiras is aligned with his peers that the materials and technique categorically disqualify this textile as a tapestry. The surface embroidery contains wool and linen threads of red, green, yellow, white, blue, and earth tones which are outlined in black to replicate the mural paintings of the period.

Segment of the Bayeux Tapestry with tituli incorporated in the scene for comparison

The exact date, patronage, and workshop producing the Creation Tapestry is unknown, however it is widely agreed that the work can be accredited to the late 11th or early 12th century in or near Catalonia. Enrique C. Gerbal, perhaps the first modern scholar to publish studies of the Creation Tapestry, points out in his work that comparable artifacts from this region and time may have been destroyed due to the political unrest in Girona through the ages which contributes to the difficulty in dating the textile. Pere de Palol and Castiñeiras both compare the work to the Bayeux Tapestry, the oldest surviving "tapestry" of this scale thought to be made shortly after the Norman conquest of England in 1066. Both textiles have clear Romanesque influences in both the Latin tituli and the forms of the imagery; however the Creation Tapestry has a sort of horror vacui as pointed out by Santina M. Levey, unlike the uniform background of the Bayeux Tapestry which is solid in color and contrasts the forms. Levey notes the similarity of the Girona Tapestry's style of embroidery in textiles from 14th century Scandinavia; however Hansueli Etter argues that the geometry in its design and maximalist use of pattern and detail could be the result of cross cultural Islamic influences from the Ottoman Empire. Castiñeiras further connects the stiff warp with Islamic Carpets made on vertical looms in what is now the Middle East. Konya carpets were most notably in high production in Anatolia during the 11th century depicting similar themes from the Quran, and it is possible that the method of production and subject matter of the Creation Tapestry was a Christian adaptation of these rugs. Altogether the cultural influence of Muslim Spanish textiles on composition and production combining with Romanesque style and Christian subject matter is a leading argument for the tapestry's alleged production in Catalonia during the 11th century.

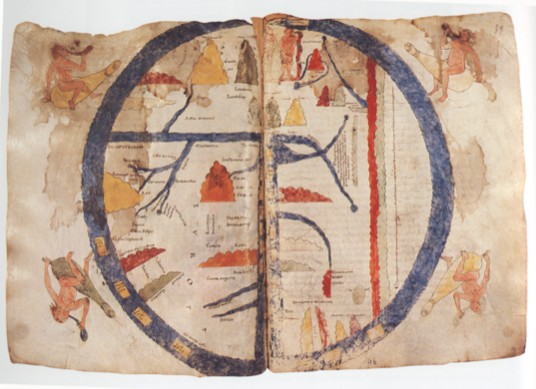
The Beatus of Turin with the four winds in each corner

A final argument for the tapestry's date and location for production comes from Palol and is echoed by Castiñieras. Both argue that the designs for the four winds occupying each corner of the tapestry can be found in the Beatus of Turin, a manuscript created in the Cathedral of Girona in the early 12th century. The page otherwise features a Mappa mundi copied from the Girona Beatus. The two scholars argue that the addition of the wind figures is evidence of the tapestry's creation before the Beatus of Turin. The Girona Tapestry also would have to have been in Girona by the time of the manuscript's illumination for it to be used as reference for the figures.

=== Restoration ===
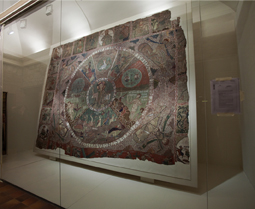
Tapestry on display in Cathedral of Girona

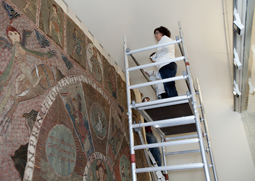
Someone doing conservation work on the tapestry

The border is formed by a frame, rather deteriorated, containing small square pictures which, according to some scholars, could have been added later to the central sector, due to their different, Byzantine-like style and themes. Currently the fabric measures 3.65 m × 4.70 m (12.0 ft × 15.4 ft) but Carmen Masdeu and Luz Morata are accredited the contemporary belief that it was actually a square measuring 4.8m at its production. There have been multiple attempts at reassembly of the tapestry as more scraps of it have been unearthed. It went under restoration in 1880 for four years, and again in 1900 for another ten. It was revisited in 1952 and in 1975, by which time the square for the month of April was reimagined and constructed.

Scholars seem to disagree about the contents of the missing third of the fabric as well. There is a general consensus that the space below the creation circle told the story of Discovering the Holy Cross, the remaining months of the year along the border, as well as the other sacred rivers on each of the corners. There was a theory that the Holy Cross was a late contribution to the overall piece, possibly from another wall hanging, because the design of the segment appears to be inconsistent with the rest of the tapestry. Castiñeiras, Palol, and Etter all refute this theory, citing the consistency of weave and perfect square design calculated by Masdeu and Morata.

== Purpose ==
There is not yet consensus regarding the initial function of the Tapestry of Girona, but theories include its use relating to a curtain, an altar cloth, a wall hanging, a carpet, and even a catafalque. Originally the tapestry may have served as a baldachin for the Altar of the Holy Cross in the church's entrance. Etter argues that the distribution of damage around the side and bottom confirms this use as a canopy above an altar, with the bottom portion describing the Discovery of the True Cross hanging behind the altar space and the wheel of time hanging above the priest. Castiñeiras instead points to the missing panel describing the Discovery of the True Cross as evidence that the Tapestry was made as a tapeta for the altar floor on Easter. He has made the connection between the composition of the textile with pavement carpets which were also catalogued in Cathedrals from Catalonia during the 10th century. While both of these theories are compelling, the thickness and stiffness of the twill ground combined with the wool couching is thought to negate its usefulness as any type of drapery, and its preservation seems negate the idea that it was ever walked on as a carpet piece. Although scholars are not united in the Girona Tapestry's conceived purpose, and although there is a large section of the tapestry missing, what can be agreed upon is that the remaining portion of the cloth is beautifully preserved for being the second oldest tapestry in Europe.

== Content ==
The tapestry, of which only the upper part remains, is divided into three cycles:

- the Genesis, presided over by the Christ Pantocrator
- the cosmic elements
- the Stories of the Holy Cross

=== Genesis ===
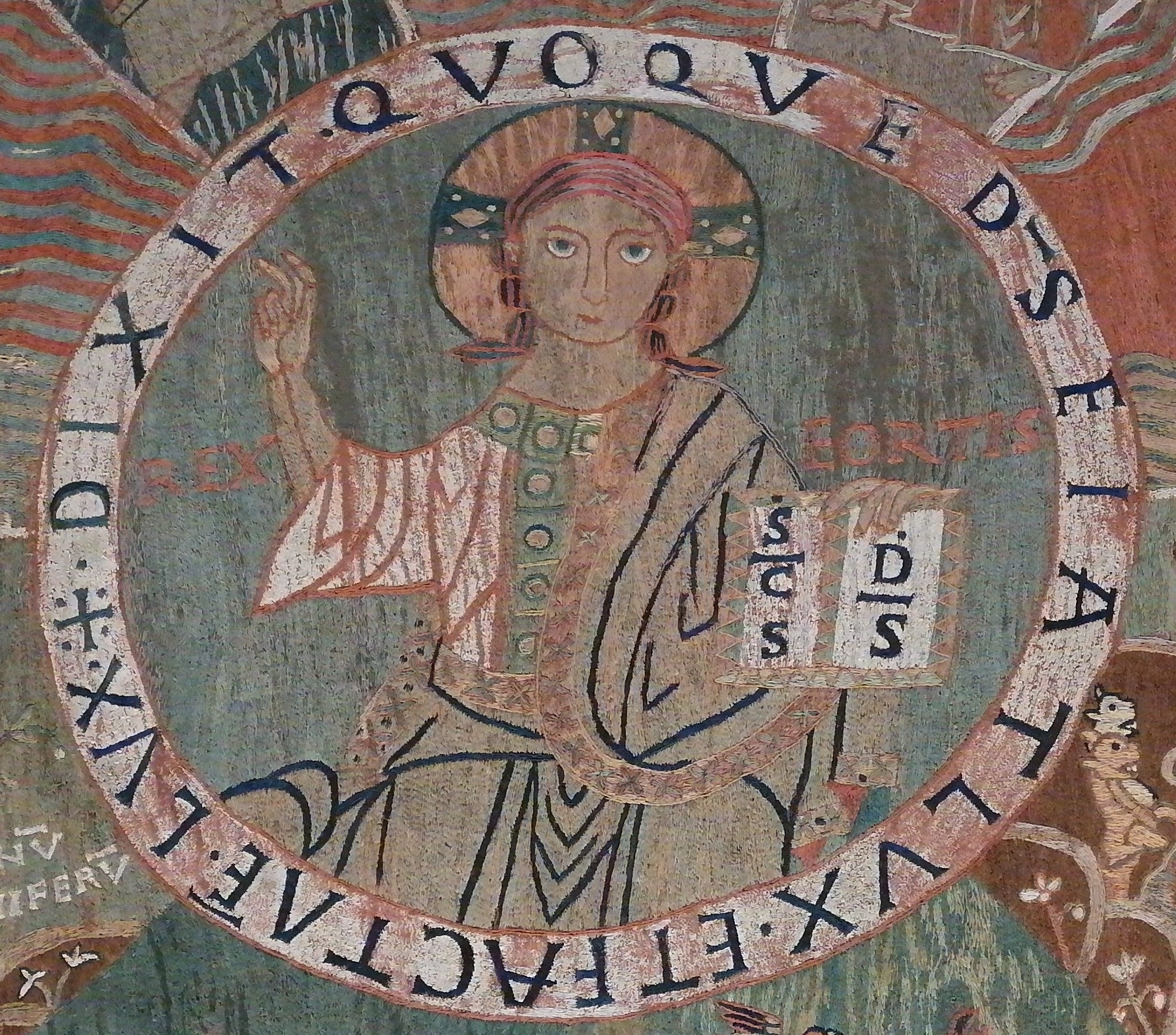
Detail of Christ Pantocrator

The Christ Pantocrator, depicted as a beardless young man, occupies a circle in the center of the tapestry. He holds a one hand up in benediction and has in the other an abbreviation of "SANCTUS DEUS" (Holy God). The negative space on either side of Him holds a low contrast emboidery of the title "REX FORTIS" (Mighty King). The two concentric circles surrounding him include quotes from the Genesis: "IN PRINCIPIO CREAVIT DEUS CELUM ET TERRAM MARE ET OMNIA QUE IN EIS SUNT ET VIDIT DEUS CUNCTA QUE FECERAT ET ERANT VALDE BONA" (In the beginning, God created Heaven and Earth, the Sea and all that there is therein, and saw that it was good); "DIXIT QUOQUE DEUS, FIAT LUX ET FACTA EST LUX" (And God said, let there be light and there was light).

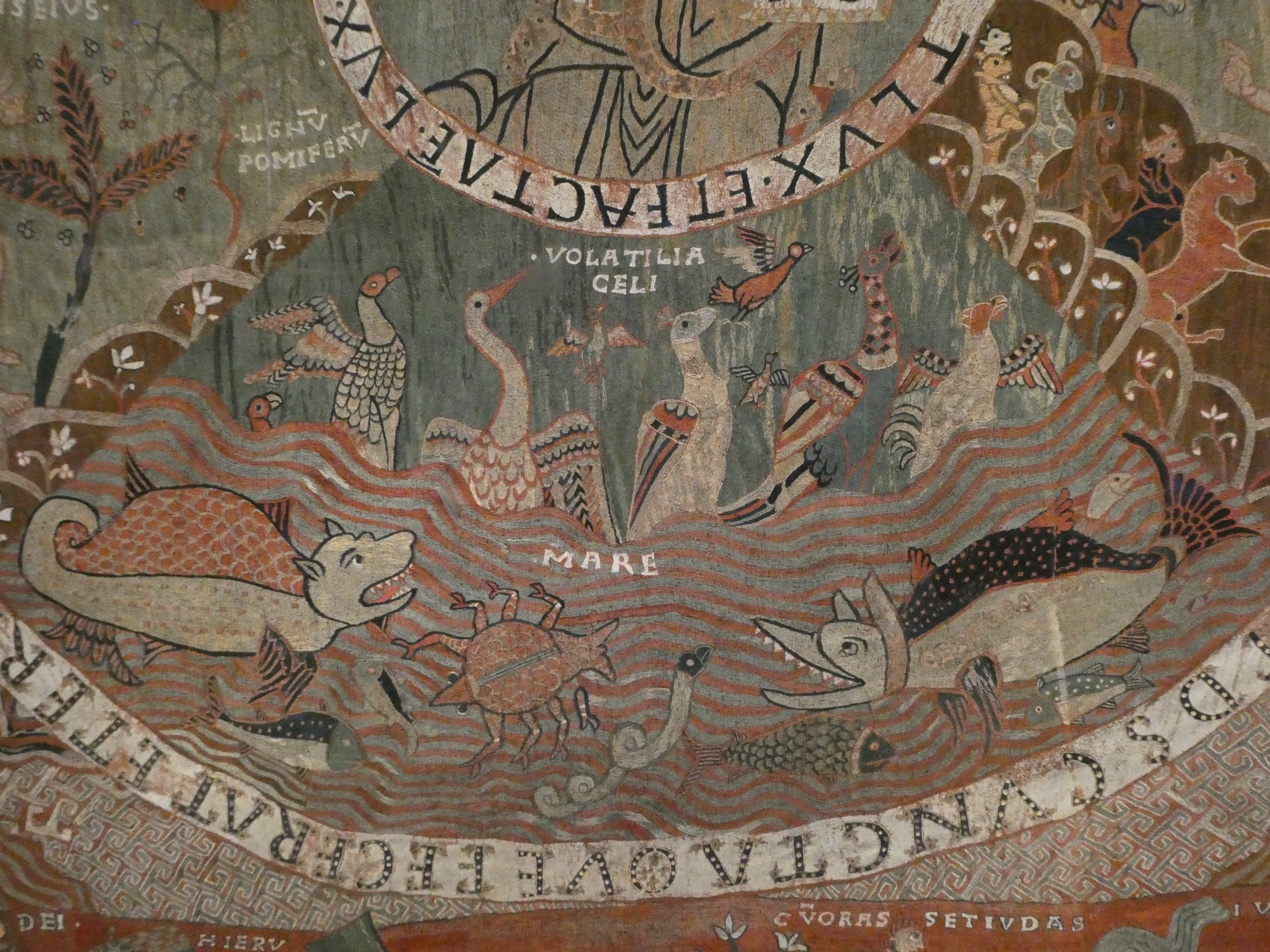
Detail of the creation of birds and fish

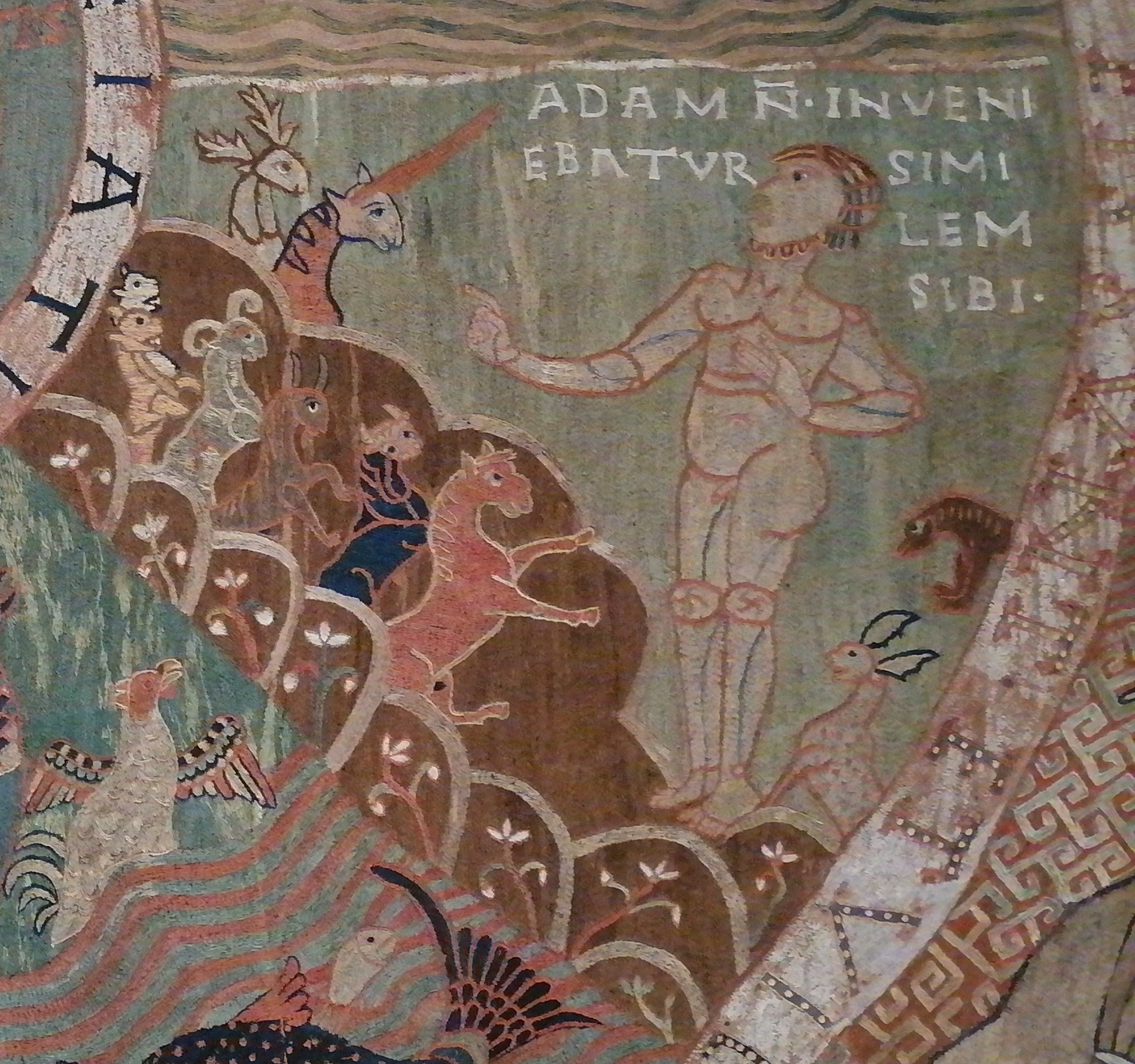
Detail of Adam

Christ is surrounded by a circle whose sectors, aside from the upper one with a dove, symbol of God, show the seven days of the creation, until the creation of Adam and Eve. The dove is nearly engulfed in primordial waters and the inscription "SPIRITUS DEI FEREBATUR SUPER AQUAS" (The Spirit of god moved over the waters) and is flanked by symbols of darkness and light in the segments on the left and right. Darkness, "TENEBRE ERANT SUPER FACIEM BEISSI" (Darkness lay over the waters) is followed by the far left segment housing the second day of creation, "FECIT DEUS FIRMAMENTUM IN MEDIO AQUARUM" (God created the firmament in the middle of the waters). The opposing image of this segment is the creation of the sun, the moon, and her stars on with "UBI DIVIDAT DEUS AQUAS AB AQUIS" (Where god divided the water from the waters). The central bottom segment is the fifth day of creation, bringing us the birds of the sky and the fish of the sea. On the right is where we see the creation of earthly animals, including Adam in search of other children of God. To the left of the bottom segment shows God transforming Adam's rib into Eve in the Garden of Eden next to the tree of life.

=== Cosmic elements ===
The remaining space in the rectangle including the central disk, houses at the corner four representation of Winds, depicted by four young winged men in Roman-like dresses, driving vessels and blowing air into horns. The central upper square is an old man representing the Year, with the wheel of time, while at the upper corners are the personifications of the Rivers of Paradise. The other six upper squares depict the Four Seasons, as well as Samson and the constellation of Hercules. Each Season is visually communicated through an associated labor: in spring the land is tilled, in summer the crops are tended, in fall there is harvest, and winter is for resting by a hearth.

The two lower corners show the personifications of the Sun (left, symbolizing Sunday) and the Moon (right, much deteriorated, symbolizing Monday), while the side outer squares represent the months (only eight of which survive). January was not yet a month on the calendar, so the procession begins with a man carrying two birds he has caught for February, "FEBRUARIUS." "APRILIS" or April is a man tilling his field. Castiñeiras notes that the imagery for May, a man feeding his horses, is reflective of the Carolingian tradition to begin preparing for war. June, "IUNIUS," shows a man both fishing and hunting birds. The months on the right side of the tapestry are all torn down the center and therefore only half of the imagery is visible. July has a scythe and pitchfork visible, presumably to harvest a field. August has just the barest edge of a hand collecting crop from the field. September has a sheaf of wheat for the closing season. October finally shifts to a different crop, depicting a swirling grape vine from which the figure collects.

=== Discovery of the True Cross ===
At the bottom are incomplete scenes of the discovery of the Holy Cross. On the left is Empress Helena identified with "SCAELENA" written vertically on her left, and she faces "IUDAS" or Judas Cyriacus in front of Jerusalem. In the middle of the missing segment there is only the top of a crucifix purportedly carried by Constantine. To the right is the inscription "CUM ORAS/SET IUDAS" describing Judas saying prayer after Christ's crucifixion and the fumes, "EUMUS," appearing as result. Finally the tapestry shows Judas testing three crosses on a corpse in a passing funerary march to see which had the power to resurrect the man. Castiñeiras speculates that the remaining portion of the tapestry may have concluded the story with images of Judas Cyriacus' baptism, or perhaps Constantine receiving the True Cross' nails from his mother.

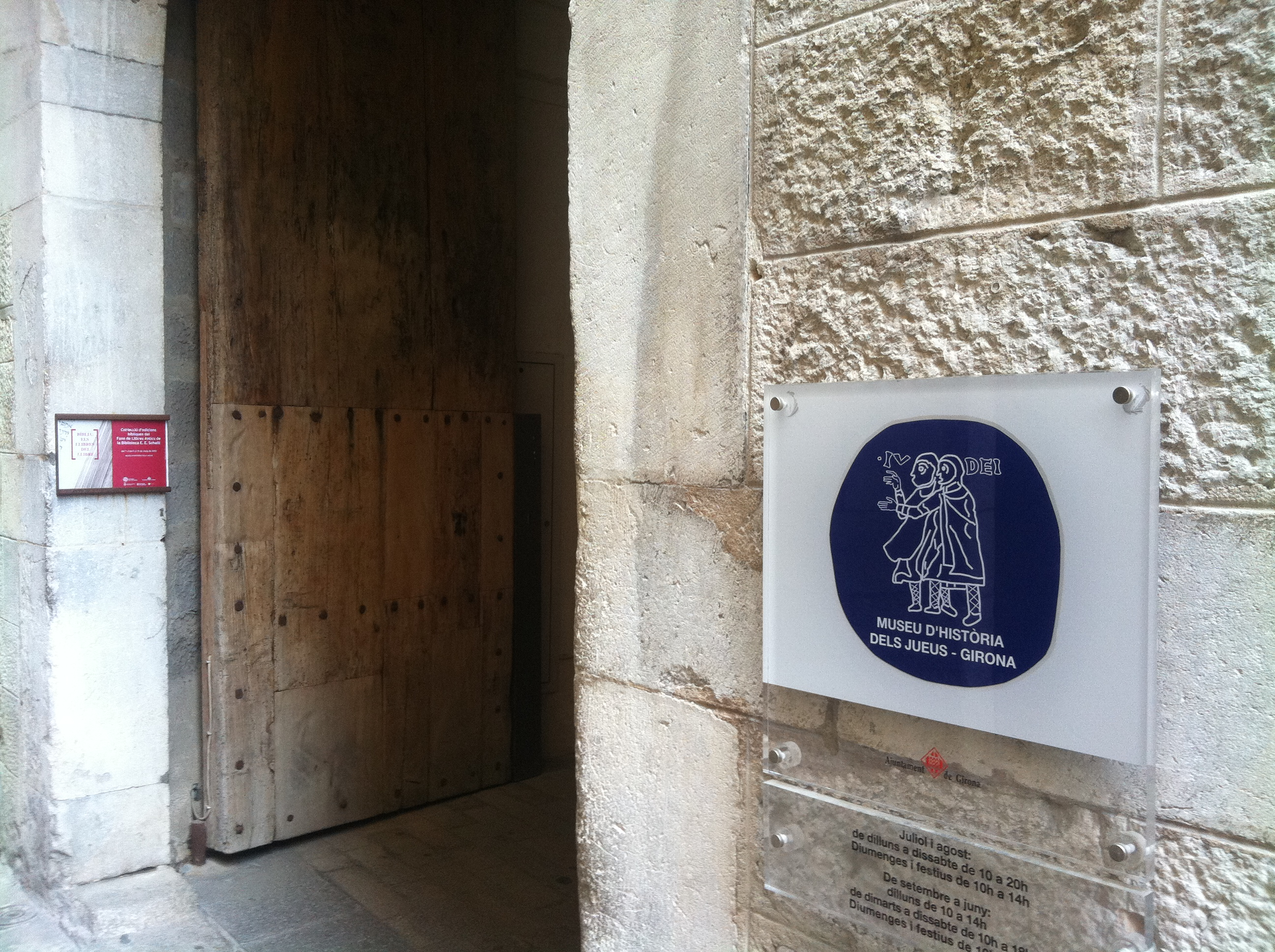
The logo of the Museum of the History of the Jews of Girona is based on two characters labelled as IUDEI in the tapestry.

== See also ==
The Bayeux Tapestry, an 11th-century, Romanesque embroidered cloth depicting events leading up to the Norman Conquest of England in 1066.
