= Jaume Camprodon i Rovira =

Spanish Catholic bishop

- Bishop of Girona
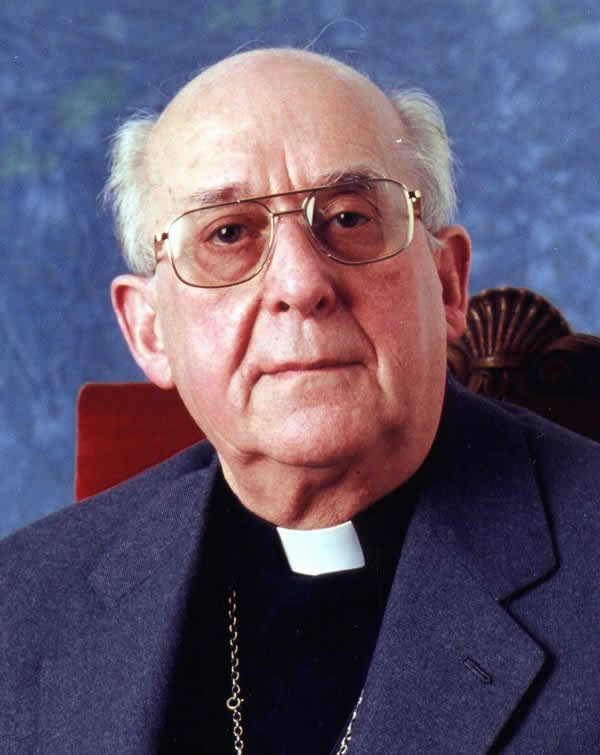
- Jaume Camprodon in 2016
- Church: Catholic Church
- Diocese: Diocese of Girona
- In office: 1 September 1973 – 30 October 2001
- Predecessor: Narcís Jubany Arnau
- Successor: Carles Soler Perdigó

Orders
- Ordination: 22 May 1949
- Consecration: 21 October 1973 by Luigi Dadaglio

Personal details
- Born: 18 December 1926 Torelló, Catalonia, Kingdom of Spain
- Died: 26 December 2016 (aged 90) Girona, Catalonia, Spain

Jaume Camprodon i Rovira (18 December 1926 – 26 December 2016) was a Catholic bishop.

Ordained to the priesthood in 1949, Camprodon i Rovina served as bishop of the Diocese of Girona, Spain, from 1973 until 2001. He was born in Torelló, Barcelona and died in Girona.
