= Narcís Jubany Arnau =

Spanish cardinal

His Eminence Narciso Jubany Arnau
- Archbishop Emeritus of Barcelona
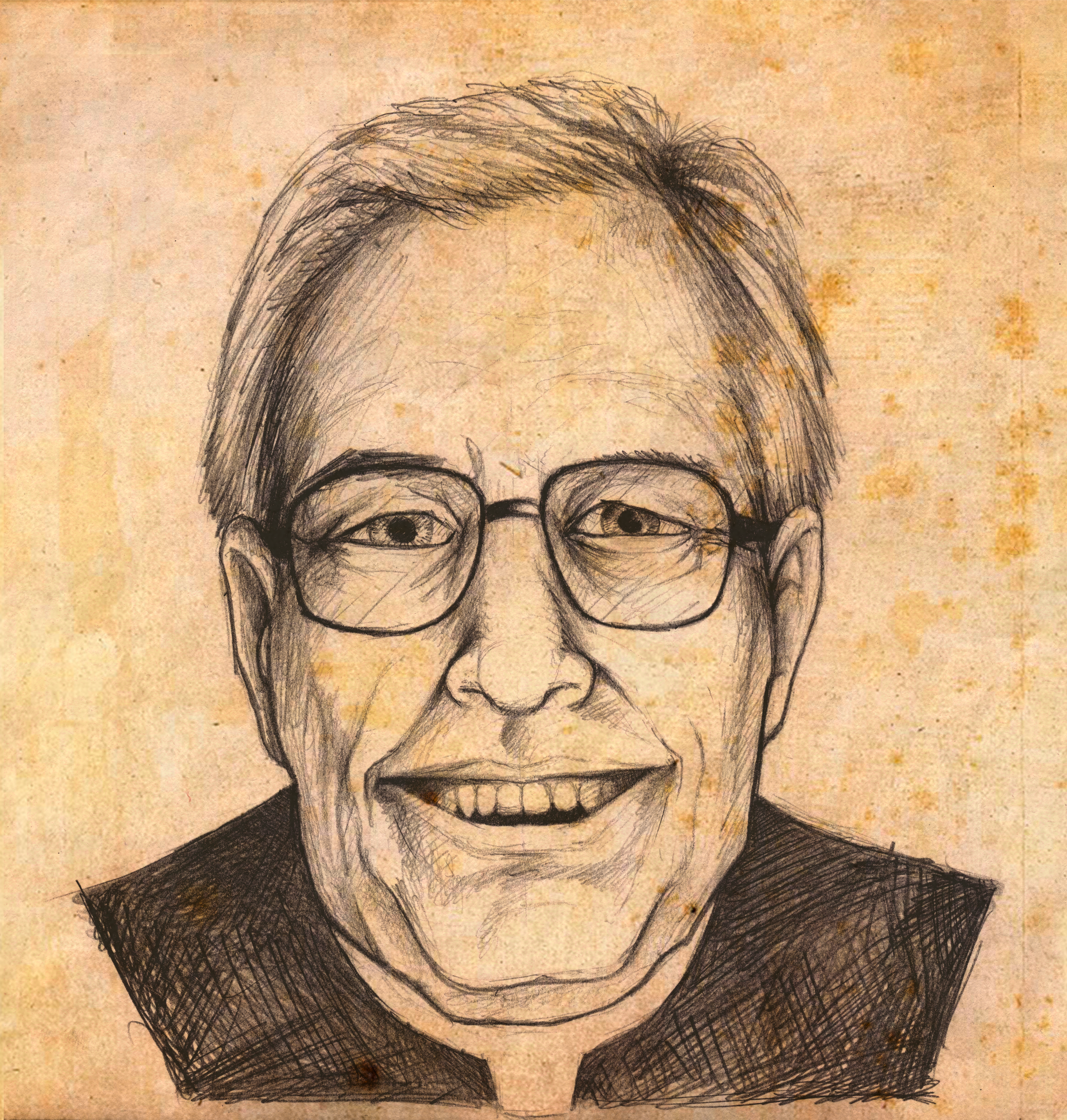
- Church: Roman Catholic Church
- Archdiocese: Barcelona
- See: Barcelona
- Appointed: 3 December 1971
- Term ended: 23 March 1990
- Predecessor: Marcelo González Martín
- Successor: Ricardo María Carles Gordó
- Other post: Cardinal-Priest of San Lorenzo in Damaso (1973–96)
- Previous posts: Titular Bishop of Orthosia in Phoenicia (1955–64); Auxiliary Bishop of Barcelona (1955–64); Bishop of Gerona (1964–71)

Orders
- Ordination: 30 July 1939
- Consecration: 22 January 1956 by Ildebrando Antoniutti
- Created cardinal: 5 March 1973 by Pope Paul VI
- Rank: Cardinal-Priest

Personal details
- Born: Narciso Jubany Arnau; 12 August 1913 Santa Coloma de Farnés, Spain
- Died: 26 December 1996 (aged 83) Barcelona, Spain
- Education: Pontifical Gregorian University
- Motto: Ut veritas evangelii permaneat
- Coat of arms: Narciso Jubany Arnau's coat of arms

Styles of Narcís Jubany Arnau
- Reference style: His Eminence
- Spoken style: Your Eminence
- Informal style: Cardinal
- See: Barcelona (emeritus)

Narcís Jubany Arnau (12 August 1913 – 26 December 1996) was a Spanish cardinal of the Roman Catholic Church. He served as Archbishop of Barcelona from 1971 to 1993, and was elevated to the cardinalate in 1973.

== Biography ==
Born in Santa Coloma de Farners to a working-class family, Narcís Jubany Arnau moved to Barcelona at age 13 and studied at its seminary. He also attended the Pontifical University of Comillas, where he obtained his doctorate in theology, and the Pontifical Gregorian University in Rome, earning his doctorate in canon law). He was ordained to the priesthood on 30 July 1939 and, after furthering his studies, did pastoral work in Barcelona, as well as teaching at its seminary and serving as an official of the diocesan tribunal and cathedral canon.

On 24 November 1955 Jubany was appointed Auxiliary Bishop of Barcelona and Titular Bishop of Orthosias in Phoenicia by Pope Pius XII. He received his episcopal consecration on 22 January 1956 from Archbishop Ildebrando Antoniutti, with Archbishops Gregorio Modrego y Casaus and José Bascuñana y López serving as co-consecrators, in the Cathedral of Barcelona. Jubany attended the Second Vatican Council from 1962 to 1965, during which he was made Bishop of Girona on 7 February 1965 and was later named Archbishop of Barcelona on 3 December 1971.

Pope Paul VI created him Cardinal Priest of San Lorenzo in Damaso in the consistory of 5 March 1973. He was a member of the Congregation for Divine Worship and the Discipline of the Sacraments, of that for Religious and Secular Institutes, and of the Pontifical Council for the Revision of the Code of Canon Law. Following the death of Generalissimo Francisco Franco in 1975, Jubany was central in his country's transition from dictatorship to democracy, fostering dialogue among a wide range of political views, supporting democracy, and showing tolerance and openness. He was one of the cardinal electors who participated in the conclaves of August and October 1978, which selected Popes John Paul I and John Paul II respectively; he is known to have wanted a non-Italian pope.

Jubany resigned as Archbishop of Barcelona on 23 March 1990, following a period of eighteen years. He lost the right to participate in any future conclaves upon reaching the age of eighty on 12 August 1993.

The Cardinal died in Barcelona, at age 82. He is buried in the cathedral of the same city.

Catholic Church titles
Preceded by José Cartaña Inglés	Bishop of Girona; 1964–1971	Succeeded by Jaume Camprodon i Rovira
Preceded by Marcelo González Martín	Archbishop of Barcelona; 1971–1992	Succeeded by Ricardo María Carles Gordó
