= Carles Soler Perdigó =

Spanish Roman Catholic bishop (1932–2023)

His Excellency Carles Soler Perdigó
- Bishop Emeritus of Girona
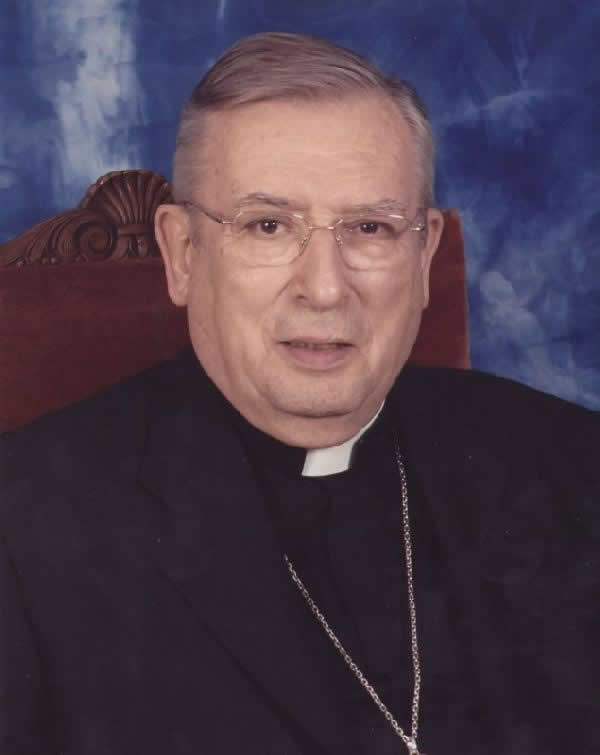
- Metropolis: Tarragona
- Appointed: 30 October 2001
- Term ended: 16 July 2008
- Predecessor: Jaume Camprodon i Rovira
- Successor: Francesc Pardo i Artigas
- Previous posts: Auxiliary Bishop of Barcelona and Titular Bishop of Pandosia (1991–2001)

Orders
- Ordination: 19 March 1960
- Consecration: 22 September 1991 by Ricardo María Carles Gordó

Personal details
- Born: 12 September 1932 Barcelona, Spain
- Died: 9 December 2023 (aged 91) Girona, Spain

Carles Soler Perdigó (12 September 1932 – 9 December 2023) was a Spanish Roman Catholic prelate. He was Auxiliary Bishop of Barcelona from 1991 to 2001 and Bishop of Girona from 2001 to 2008. Soler Perdigo died on 9 December 2023, at the age of 91.

Catholic Church titles
Preceded by Jaume Camprodon i Rovira	Bishop of Girona; 2001–2008	Succeeded by Francesc Pardo i Artigas
Preceded by —	Auxiliary Bishop of Barcelona; 1991–2001	Succeeded by —
Preceded by Andrea Cordero Lanza di Montezemolo	Titular Bishop of Pandosia; 1991–2001	Succeeded by Giuseppe Pinto
