= Octavi Vilà Mayo =

Spanish Catholic archbishop and professed monk (born 1961)

His Excellency, The Most Reverend, Monsignor. Octavi Vilà Mayo OCist
- Metropolitan Archbishop-designate of Barcelona
- Archdiocese: Barcelona
- See: Barcelona
- Appointed: 11 November 2026
- Installed: 19 December 2026 (scheduled)
- Predecessor: Juan José Omella
- Previous posts: Abbot of Poblet (2015–24); Bishop of Girona (2024-26)

Orders
- Ordination: 1 May 2015 by Jaume Pujol Balcells
- Consecration: 21 April 2024 by Joan Planellas i Barnosell

Personal details
- Born: 11 December 1961 (age 64) Tarragona, Catalonia, Spain
- Styles
- Reference style: His Excellency; The Most Reverend
- Spoken style: Monsignor
- Religious style: Archbishop

Octavi Vilà Mayo OCist (born 11 December 1961) is a Spanish prelate of the Catholic Church who has been appointed Metropolitan Archbishop of Barcelona. He pursued a secular career in information technology and archive administration until joining the Cistercians in 2006. He was Abbot of Poblet from 2015 to 2024 and Bishop of Girona from 2024 to 2026.

== Biography ==
Vilá was born 11 December 1961 in Tarragona, Spain, the youngest of four children. His father worked for a local savings bank, and assisted the Cistercians of Poblet with their financial affairs, at times accompanied by Octavi. He began his schooling at La Salle Tarragona. He earned a licentiate in geography and history in 1984, while also fulfilling his military service obligation in Valencia. He earned a diploma in library and information science at the University of Barcelona in 1987, and a diploma in new information technologies at the Polytechnic University of Catalonia in 1996. He was secretary and vice president of the Bibliographic Archive of Santes Creus, a former Cistercian monastery, from 1998 to 2005. In 2000 he earned a degree in cultural resources management from Pompeu Fabra University. He has authored articles on contemporary history and library science, with particular attention to newspaper archives.

He studied philosophy and theology at the Faculty of Theology of Catalonia. He entered the Poblet Abbey in July 2005 and entered the novitiate on 26 January 2006. After taking the initial vows on 26 January 2007, he professed his perpetual vows in 2010 and subsequently received priestly ordination on 1 May 2015 by Jaume Pujol Balcells, Archbishop of Tarragona. He was elected subabbot in May 2014 and then abbot on 3 December 2015 at the same abbey. He was re-elected on 2 December 2021. During the Catalan independence referendum crisis of 2017, he maintained dialogue with factions on both sides and later met with imprisoned leaders of the movement. He led the community through the COVID crisis and managed the re-opening of its guesthouse and tourist visits. He expanded the Abbey's music program, collaborating with Jordi Savall. The Abbey also sheltered refugees from Ukraine for several months.

Vilà with Pope Francis in 2022

On 29 February 2024, Pope Francis appointed him bishop of the Diocese of Girona. Vilà received his episcopal consecration on 21 April from Joan Planellas i Barnosell, Archbishop of Tarragona. He is a member of the Episcopal Commission for Consecrated Life of the Spanish Episcopal Conference and since February 2025 has chaired the Interdiocesan Liturgy Commission of the Episcopal Conference of Tarraconense. (Note: The Terraconense Conference comprises the ecclesiastical provinces of Barcelona and Tarragona.) In Girona he maintained friendly relations with the city's mayor, a leftist advocate of Catalan independence.

When Pope Leo visited Barcelona in June 2026, Vilà criticized Vatican organizers for failing to use more Catalan in his visit to La Sagrada Familia, especially during the blessing of the tower; (Note: Vilà's criticism was expressed as "regret" that more Catalan was not used, while politicians use sharper language.) Leo ultimately used both Catalan and Spanish for the blessing.

On 11 November 2026, Pope Leo XIV named him Metropolitan Archbishop of Barcelona. His installation there is scheduled for 19 December. He was widely believed that the regional Catalan government favored him for the position. His appointment was welcomed by some who felt his predecessor had not sufficiently accommodated the Catalan community's concerns, specifically the Cardinal's "lack of linguistic sensitivity". One noted Vilà's "profound knowledge of the country’s history and culture" and "deep rootedness in the land." He was described variously as a catalanista or pro-Catalan and as a "staunch and unwavering Catalan nationalist" and a close friend of Carles Puigdemont, a key Catalan nationalist politician. Others reported that Pope Leo was impressed during his visit by the popular use of Catalan and the spirituality of the Catalan church, and they thought the appointment would "unsettle" some in the Spanish Episcopal Conference by eschewing any preference for Spain's conservative political parties.
