= Musée de Cluny =

Museum of medieval art in Paris, France

Coordinates: 48°51′02″N 2°20′36″E

Musée de Cluny-Musée National du Moyen Âge
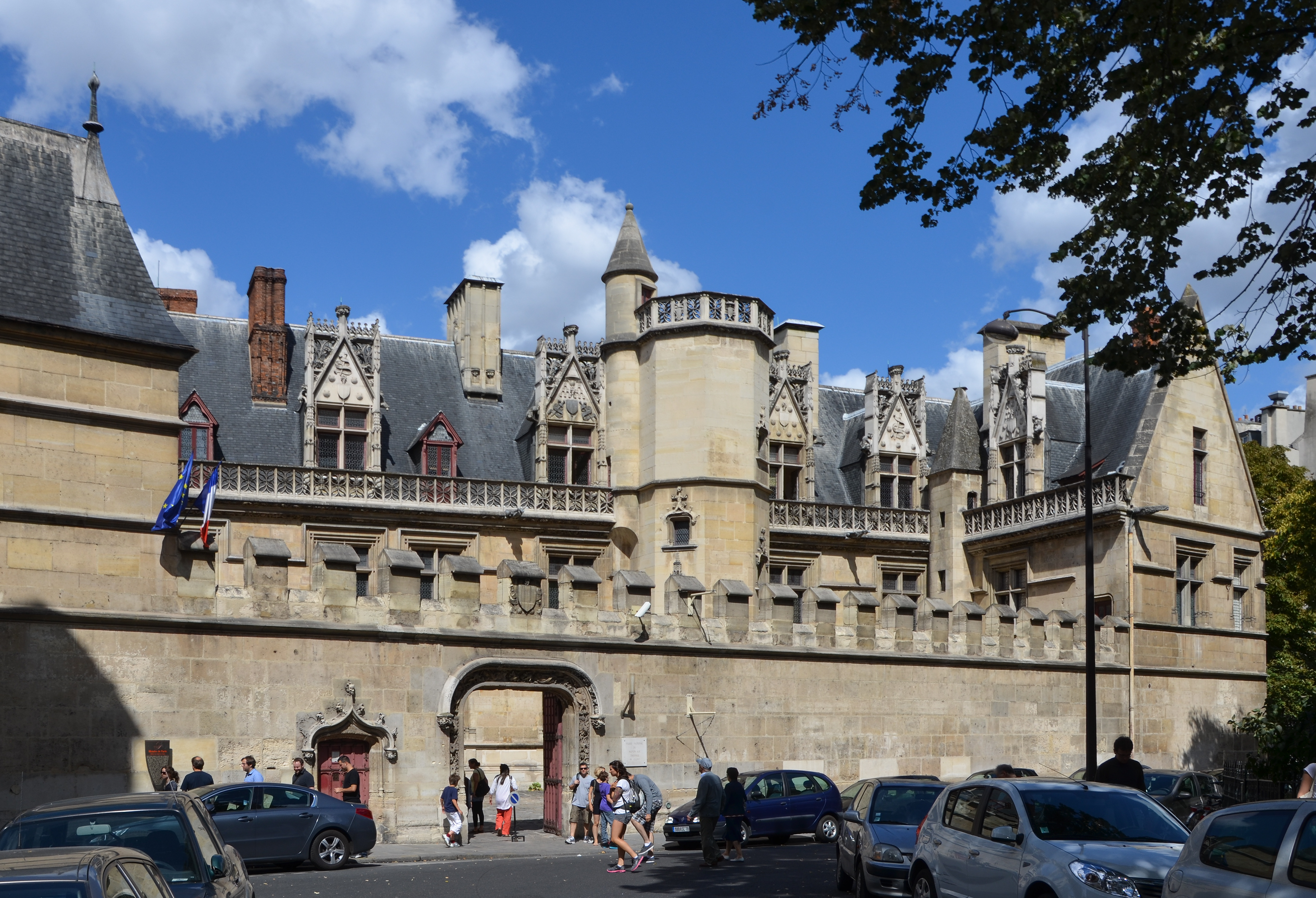
- Exterior view of the Musée de Cluny
- Established: 1843
- Location: 28, Rue du Sommerard, Paris, France
- Type: Museum of medieval art
- Public transit access: Cluny–La Sorbonne
- Website: musee-moyenage.fr

The Musée de Cluny (French pronunciation: [myze də klyni]), officially Musée de Cluny-Musée National du Moyen Âge (lit. 'Cluny Museum-National Museum of the Middle Ages'), is a museum of medieval art in Paris. It is located in the 5th arrondissement of Paris, bordered by square Samuel-Paty to the south, boulevard Saint-Michel to the west, boulevard Saint-Germain to the north, and rue Saint-Jacques to the east.

Its building combines Roman-era thermae, the Thermes de Cluny, including a well-preserved frigidarium, and the 15th-century Hôtel de Cluny, the Parisian mansion of the Abbey of Cluny. The museum houses one of the largest collections of art from the Middle Ages, consisting of 23,000 items, of which about 2,300 are exhibited. The museum's holding includes the iconic series of six 15th-century tapestries known as The Lady and the Unicorn.

== History ==
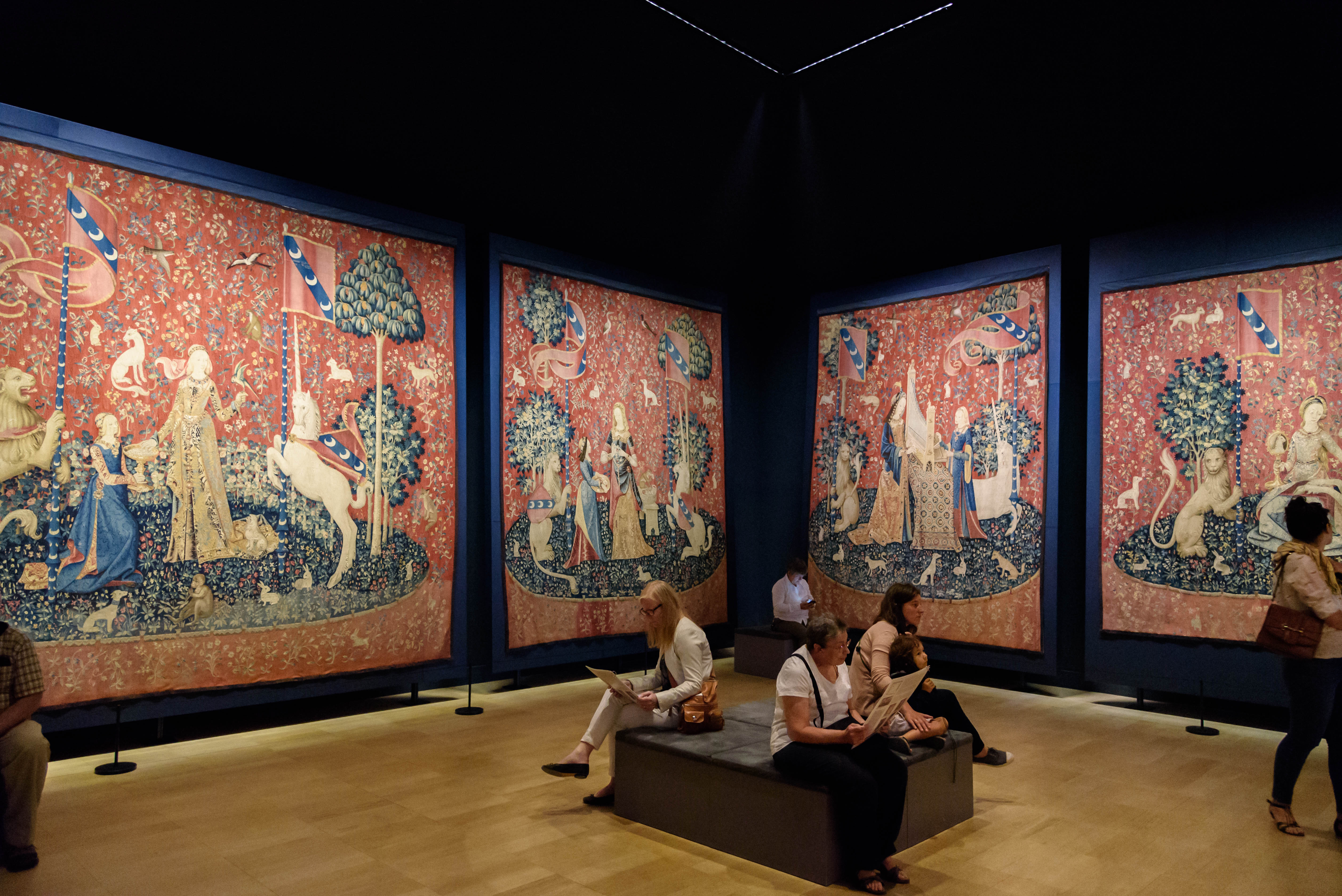
The Lady and the Unicorn tapestries in 2015

The Hôtel de Cluny is a rare extant example of the civic architecture of medieval Paris, erected in the late 15th century to replace an earlier structure built by Pierre de Chaslus after the Cluny Abbey acquired the ancient Roman baths in 1340. At that time, the mansion was part of a larger complex that also included a religious college (French: Collège de Cluny, no longer extant) on the location of the present-day place de la Sorbonne.

The Cluny mansion was rebuilt under Jacques d'Amboise, abbot in commendam of Cluny 1485–1510, combining Gothic and some early Renaissance elements. D'Amboise used it while also Bishop of Clermont and Abbot of Jumièges. Later users included Mary Tudor, sister of Henry VIII of England, who resided there in 1515, after the death of her husband Louis XII; James V of Scotland in 1537, on the occasion of his wedding with Madeleine of Valois; and several 17th-century papal nuncios, including Mazarin. In the 18th century, the tower of the Hôtel de Cluny was used as an observatory by astronomers Joseph-Nicolas Delisle, Jérôme Lalande, and Charles Messier who in 1771, published his observations in the Messier catalog. The chapel also housed the printing press of Nicolas-Léger Moutard, official printer of the Queen of France from 1774 to 1792. During the French Revolution in 1789, the mansion was confiscated by the state, and for the next three decades served various purposes, including the use of the former Abbots' chapel as a dissection room.

In December 1832, archeologist and art collector Alexandre Du Sommerard bought the Hôtel de Cluny and used it to display his large collection of medieval and Renaissance objects. Upon his death in 1842, the collection was purchased by the French state. The building was opened as a museum in 1843, with Sommerard's son Edmond Du Sommerard serving as its first director. The buildings were restored by the architect Albert Lenoir, son of preservationist Alexandre Lenoir.

The mansion was granted monument historique status in 1846, and the thermal baths were granted that status in 1862. In February 1926, the museum was brought under the aegis of the Louvre's department of decorative arts (Objets d'Art), from which it was released in 1977. A new museography was created in the late 1940s, with a thematic display of works focusing on different workmanship categories and techniques such as stonework, ironwork, glasswork, etc. A garden opened in 1971, including a 'unicorn's forest" inspired by the museum's iconic tapestries series of the Lady and the Unicorn. In 1977, the museum's Renaissance art collections were transferred to the newly created Musée National de la Renaissance at the Château d'Écouen in the northern outskirts of Paris, freeing additional space for medieval artworks. In 1981, a new room was created to present recently rediscovered statuary from Notre-Dame cathedral. In 1992, the display of the Lady and the Unicorn tapestries was redesigned.

In 2011, the French culture ministry initiated a more comprehensive renovation, dubbed "Cluny 4" in a conscious echo of the latest church of Cluny Abbey known as Cluny III. This included a redesign of the Lady and the Unicorn display in 2013; cleaning-up of the Roman baths and medieval chapel in 2015–2017; the construction of a new building designed by architect Bernard Desmoulin for ancillary facilities in 2016–2018; and a chronologically reorganized display of medieval art collections, including structural alterations such as a new staircase in the building's northeastern corner, conducted from 2019 to 2022. The renovated museum reopened on 12 May 2022, for a total cost of 23.1 million euros partly financed by the proceeds of the Louvre Abu Dhabi contract.

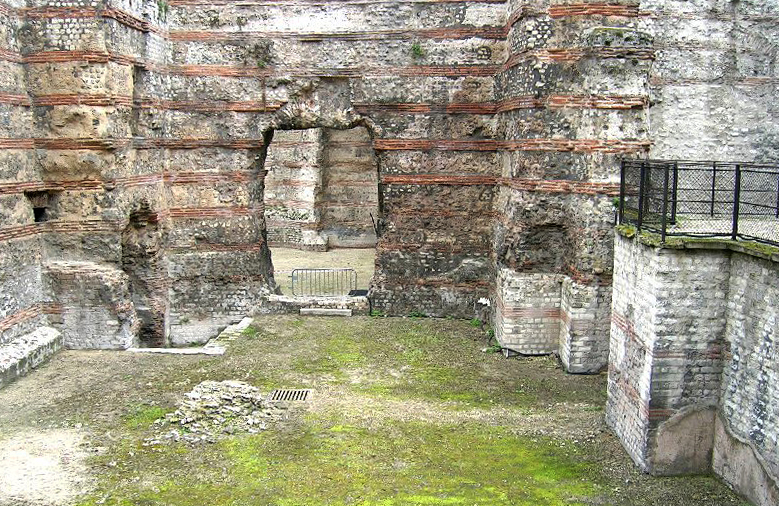
Caldarium of the Thermes de Cluny

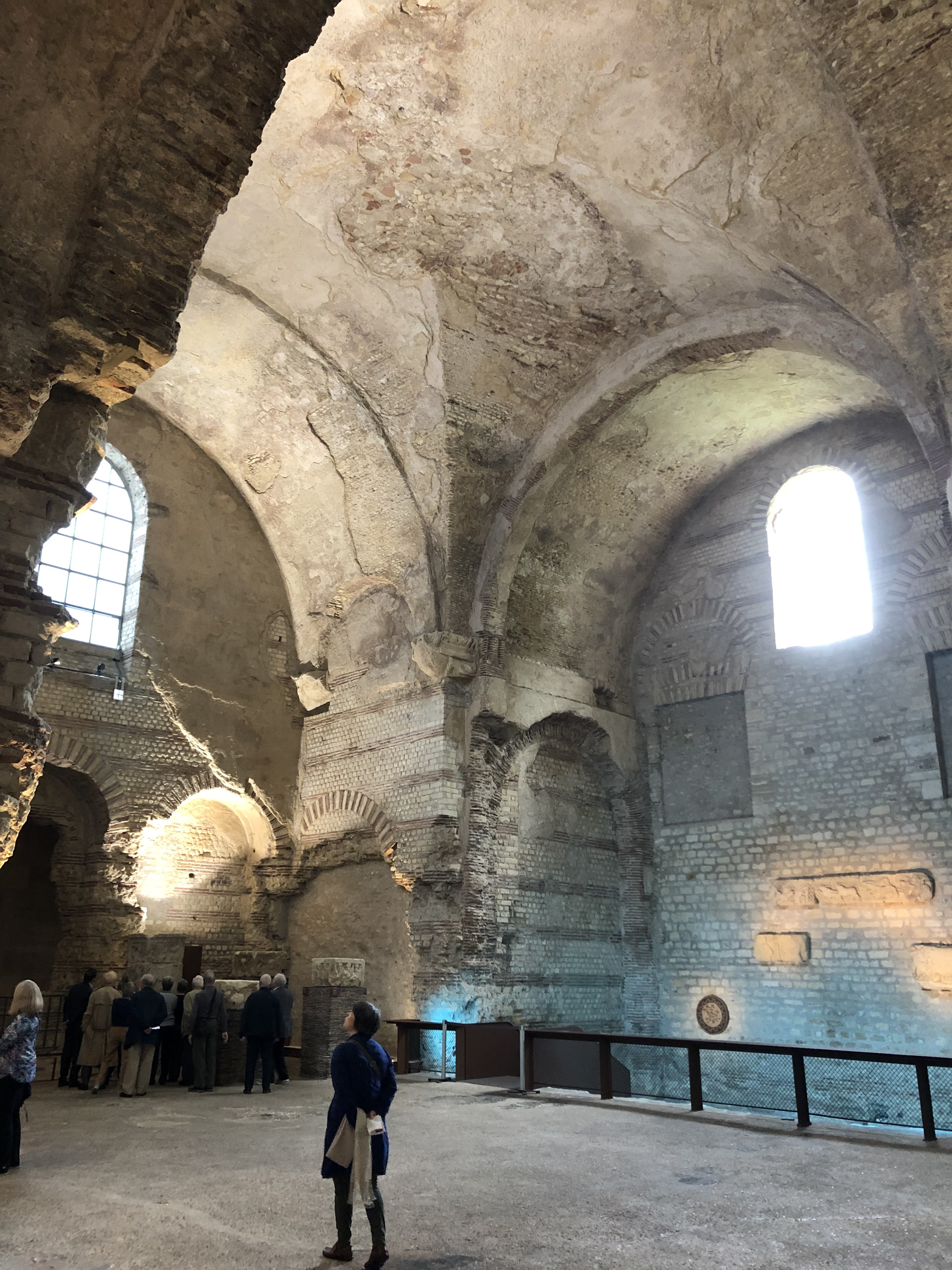
Roman baths' Frigidarium

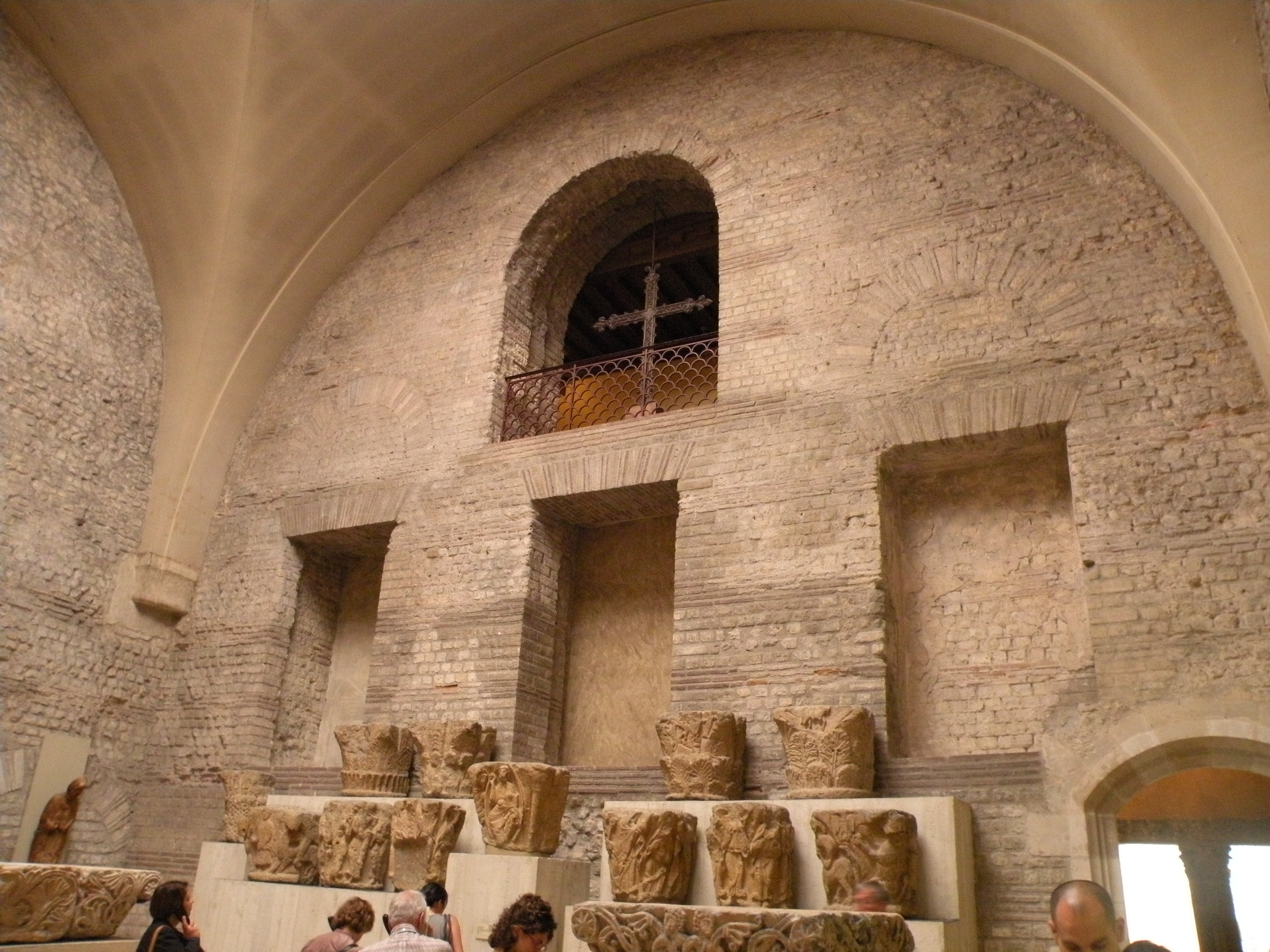
Room of the Roman baths with capitals from the Abbey of Saint-Germain-des-Prés

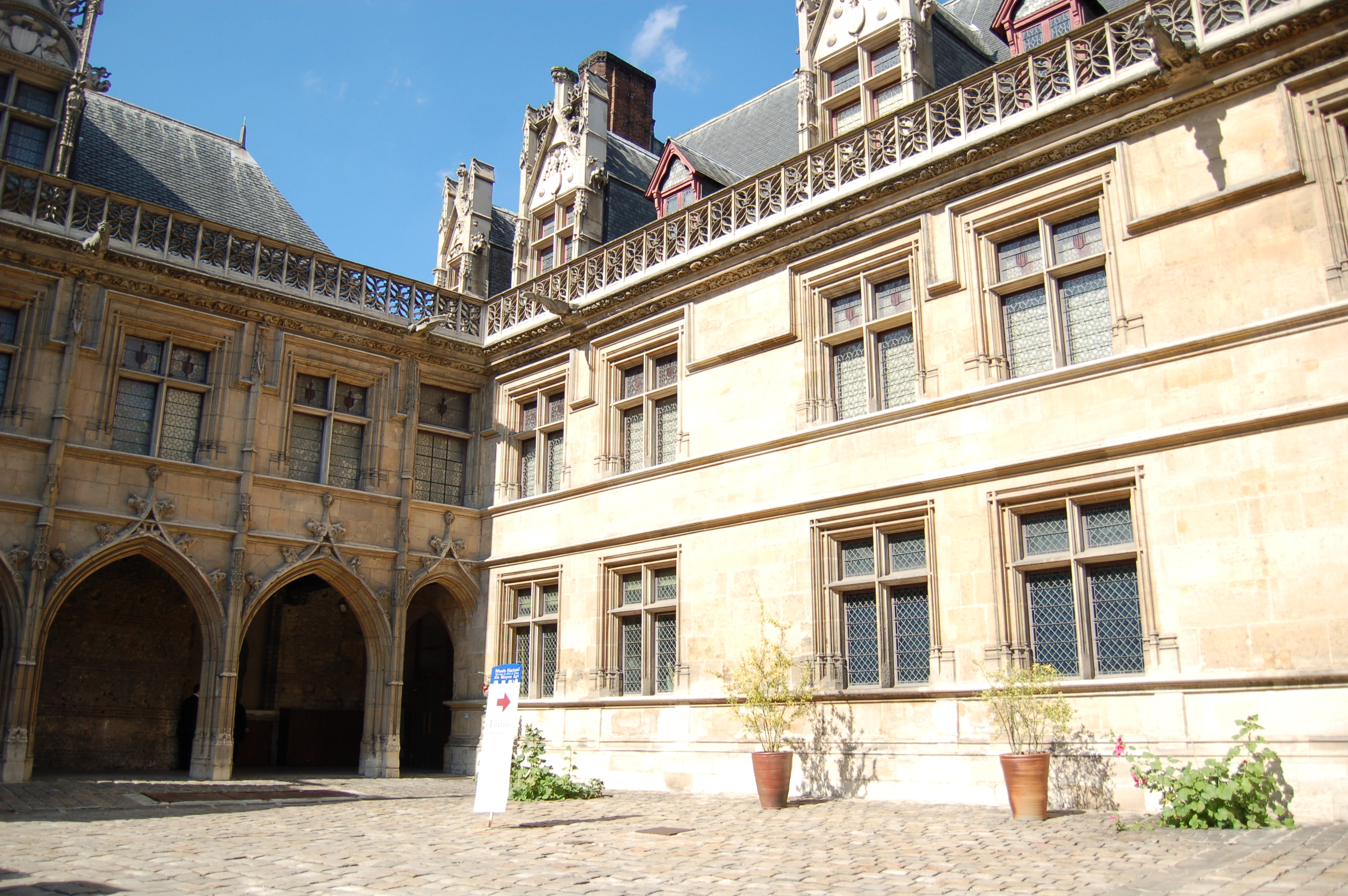
View of the courtyard and its gallery

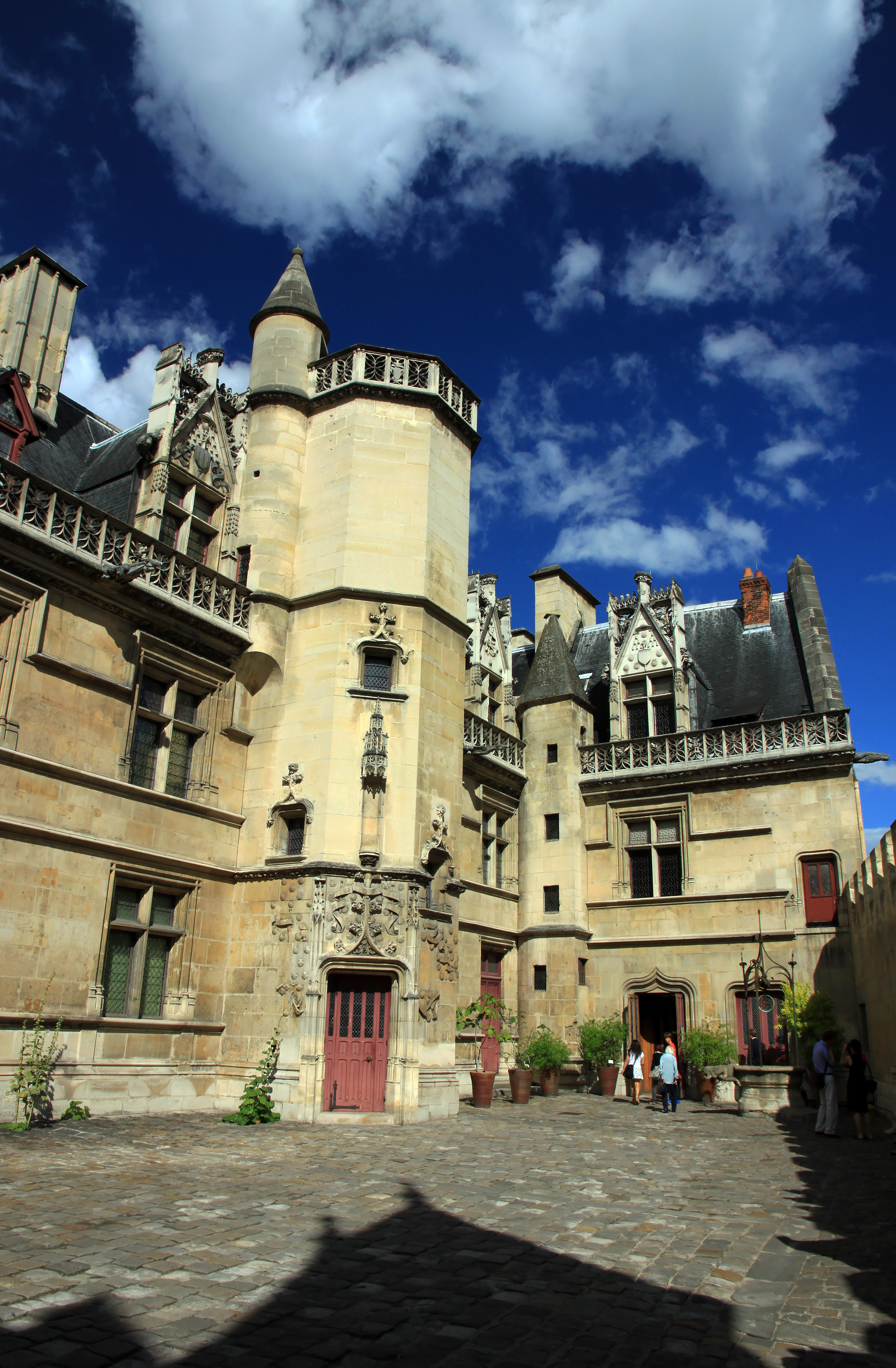
View of the courtyard and tower

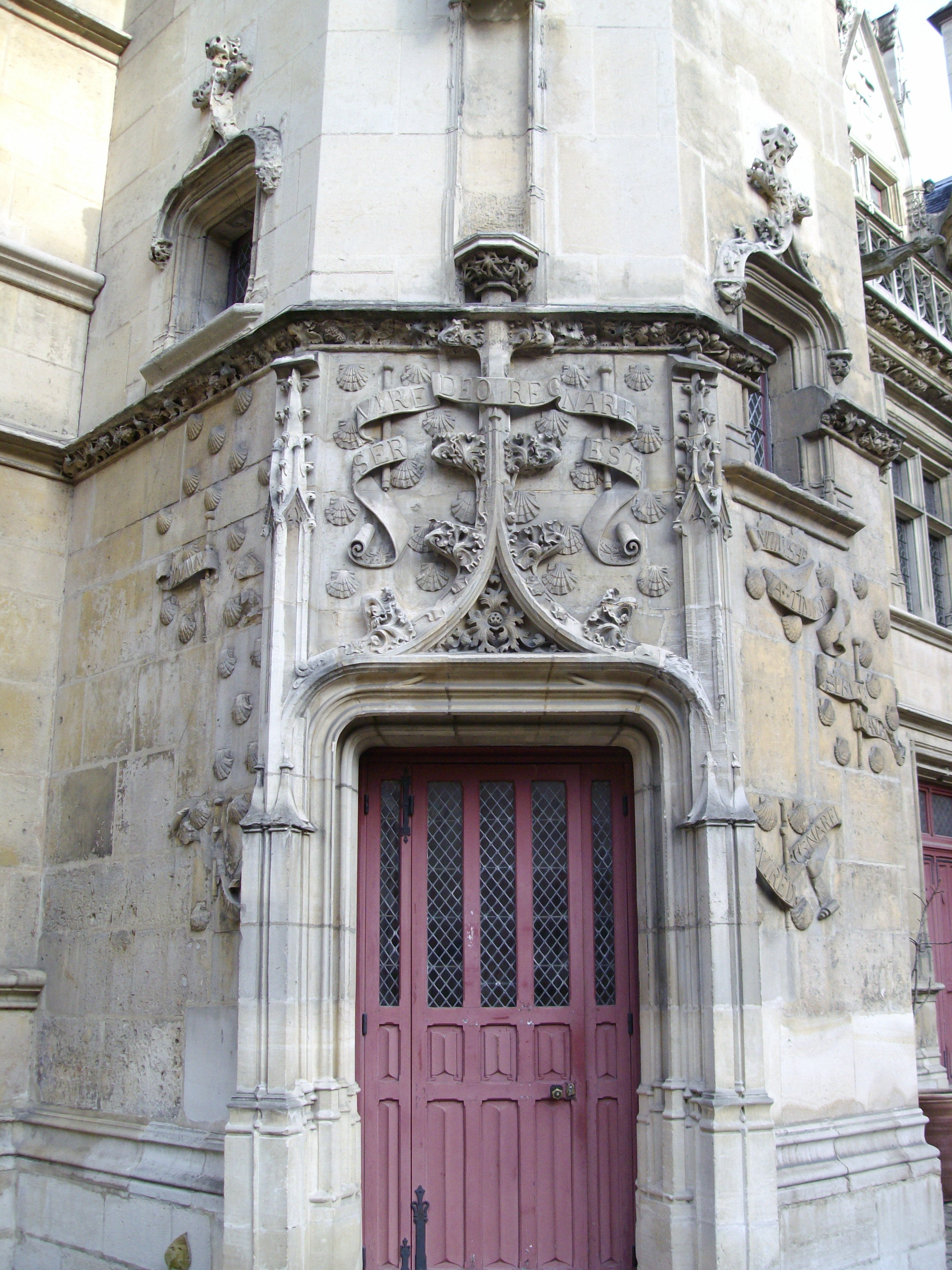
Tower door

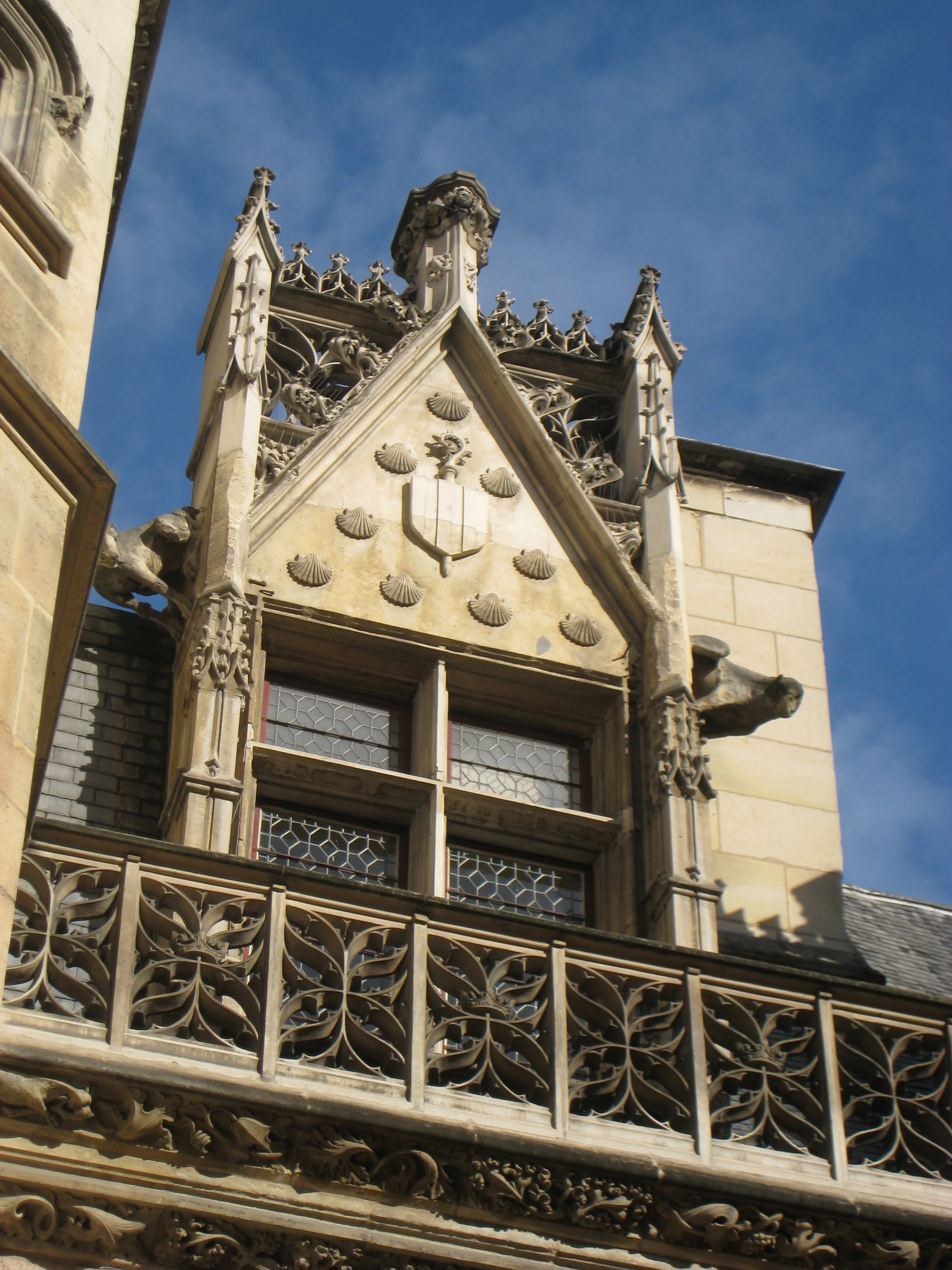
Gable window

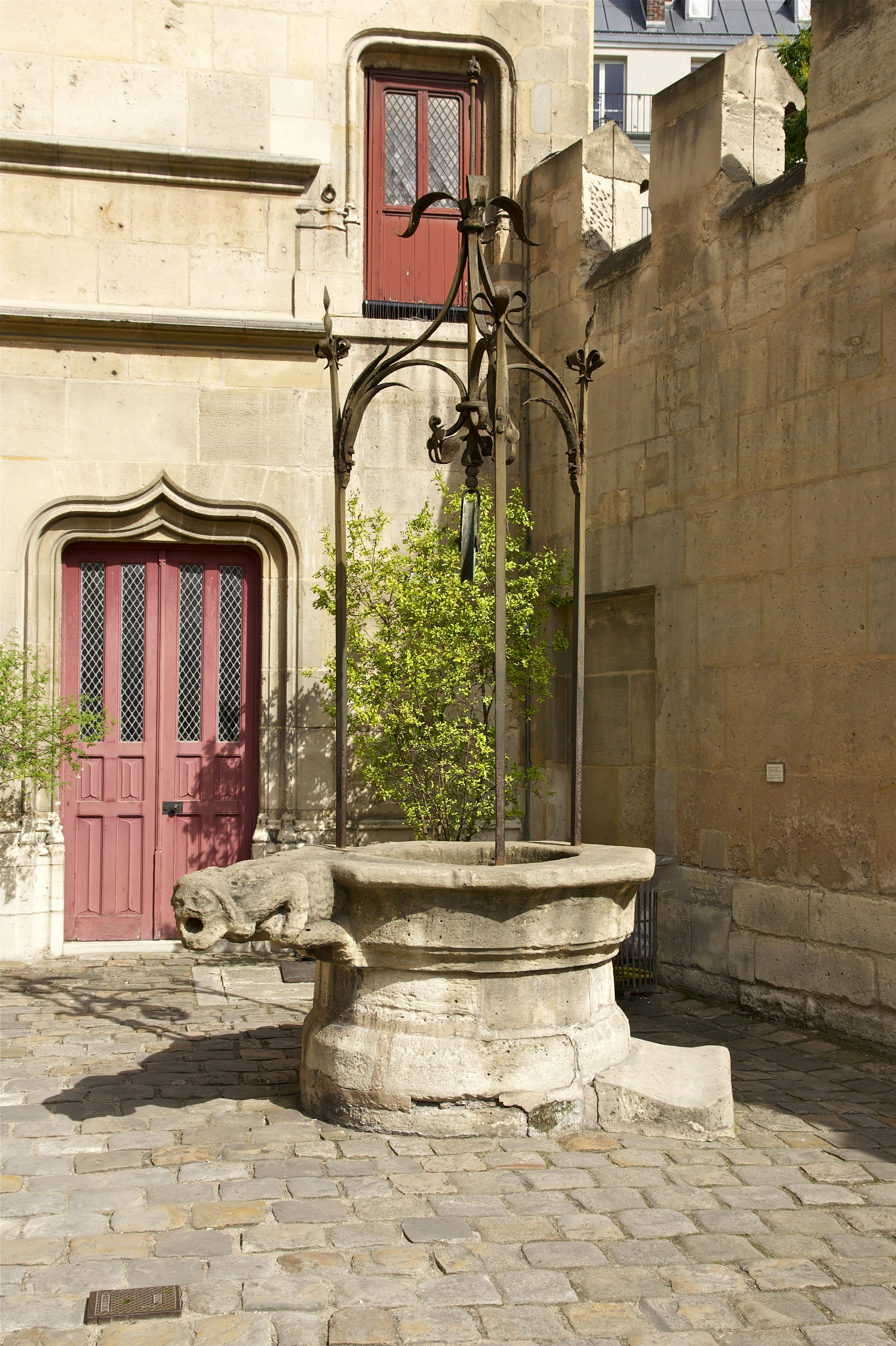
The well

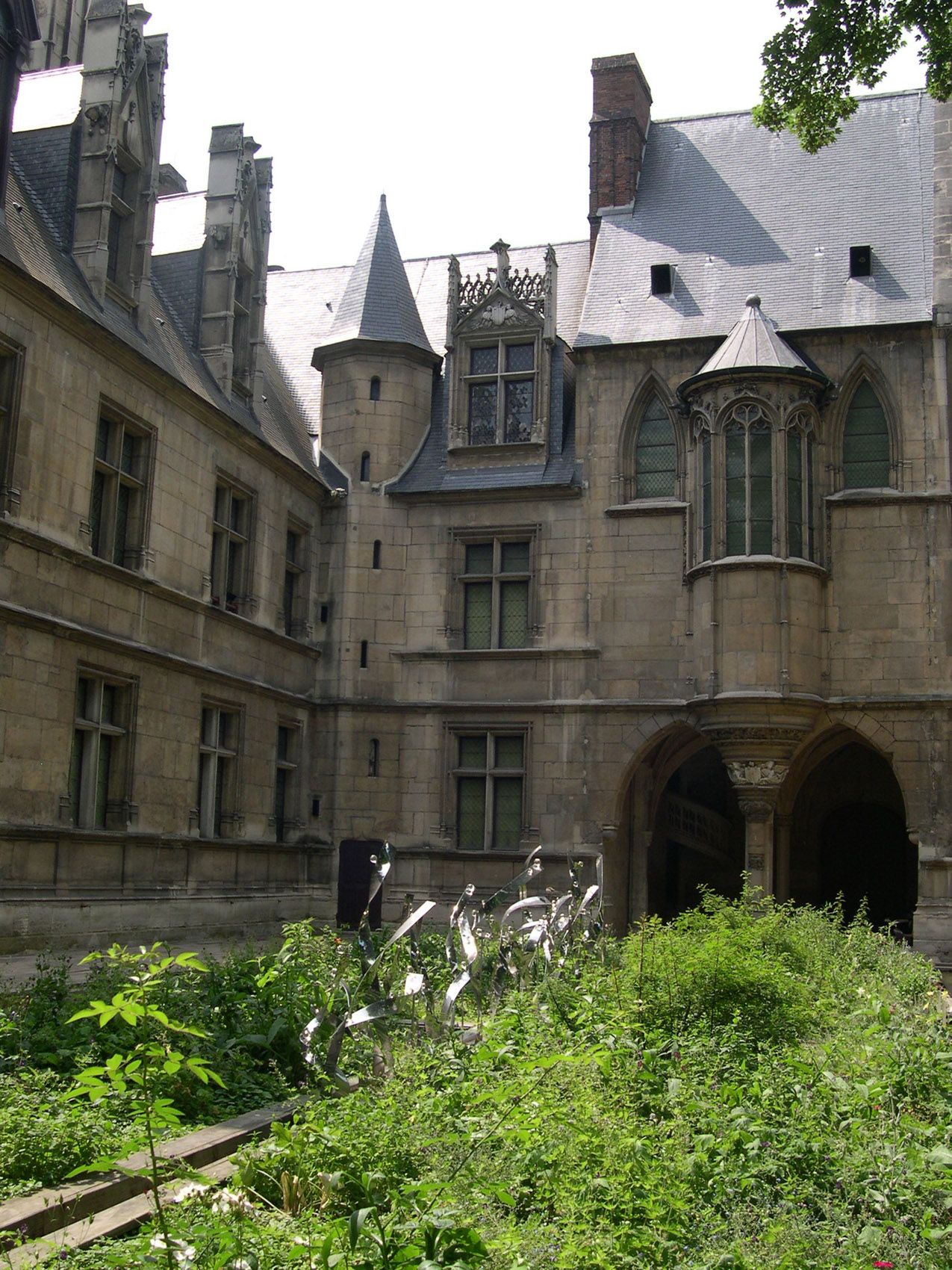
View from the medieval garden

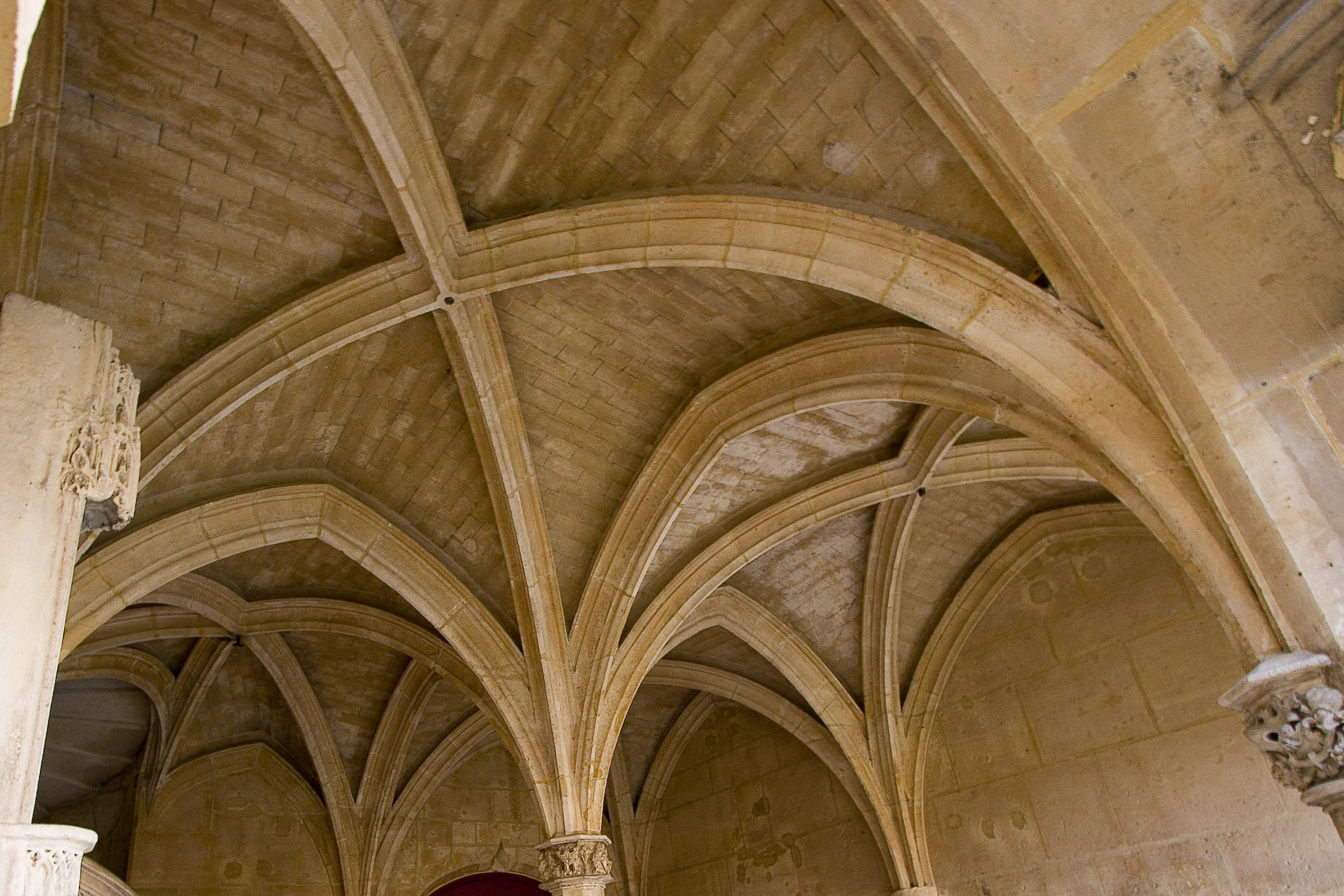
View of the garden arcades

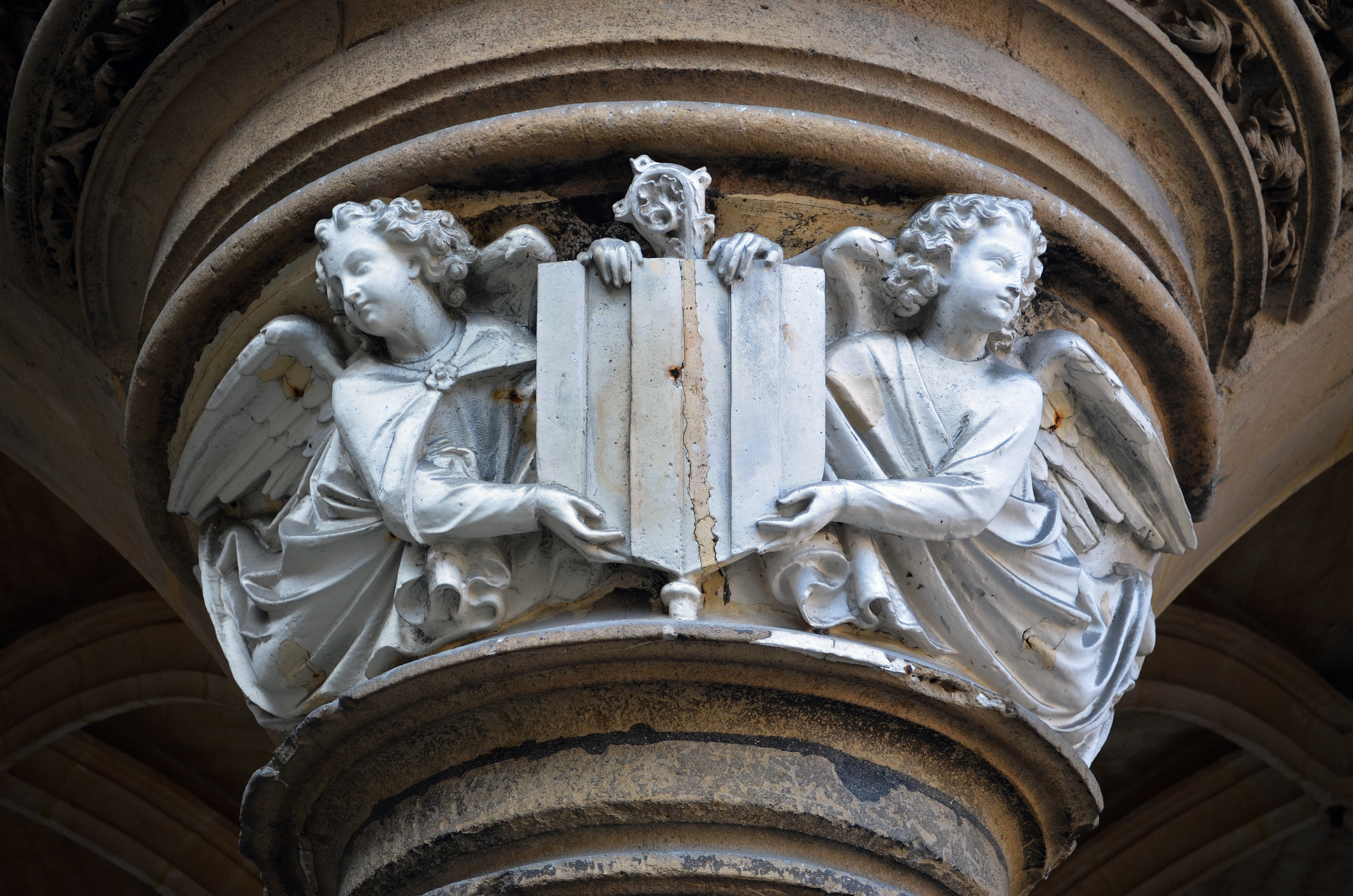
Capitals under the arcades

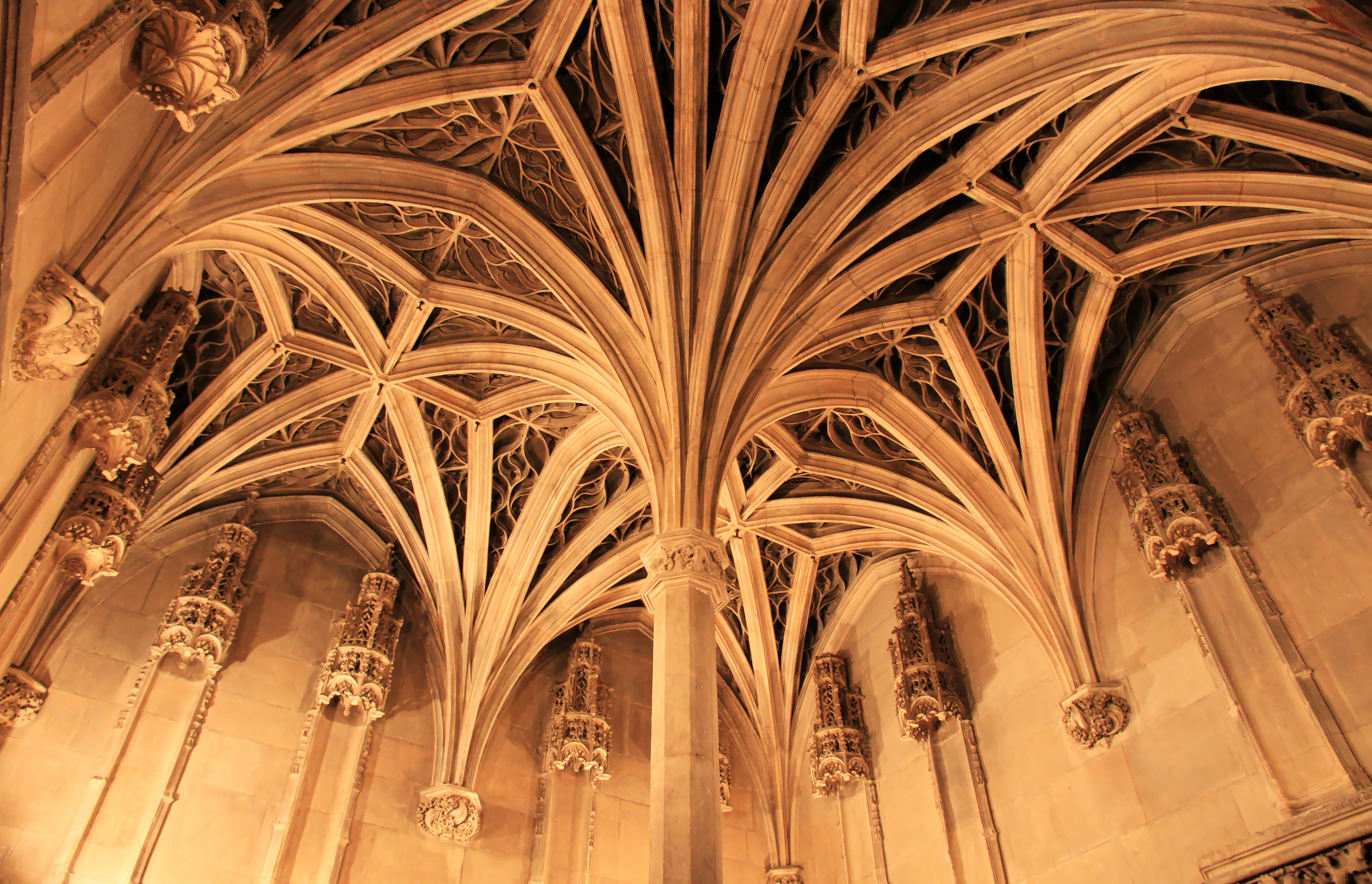
Vaults of the gothic chapel

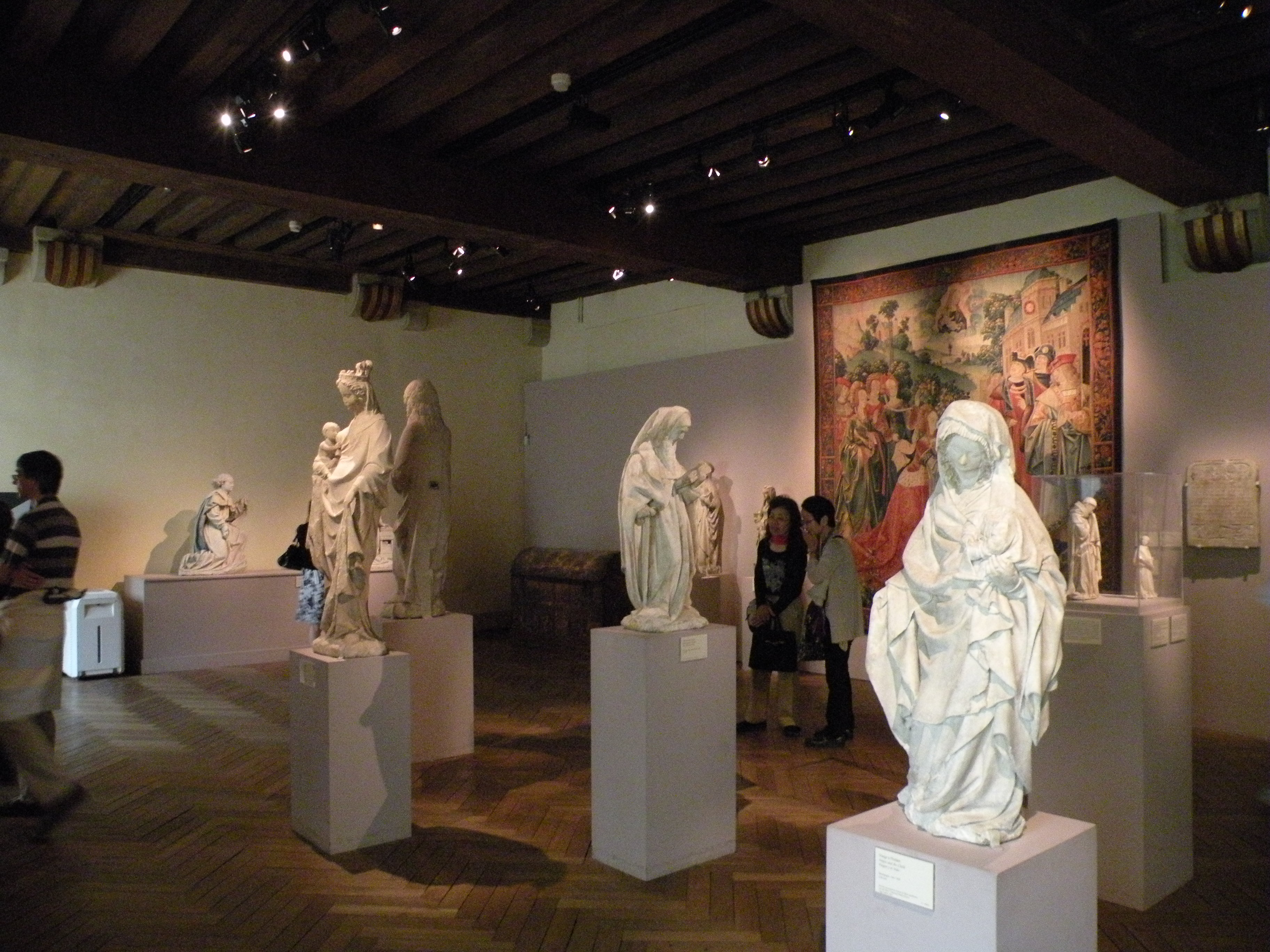
One of the rooms of the museum

== Collections ==
The museum is 11,500 square feet, 6,500 of which are designed for expositions. It contains around 23,000 artifacts dating from the Gallo-Roman period up until the 16th century. There are currently 2,300 artifacts on display. The collections contain pieces from Europe, the Byzantine Empire, and the Islamic world of the Middle Ages.

=== From antiquity to the Early Middle Ages ===
==== L'Île-de-la-Cité, France ====
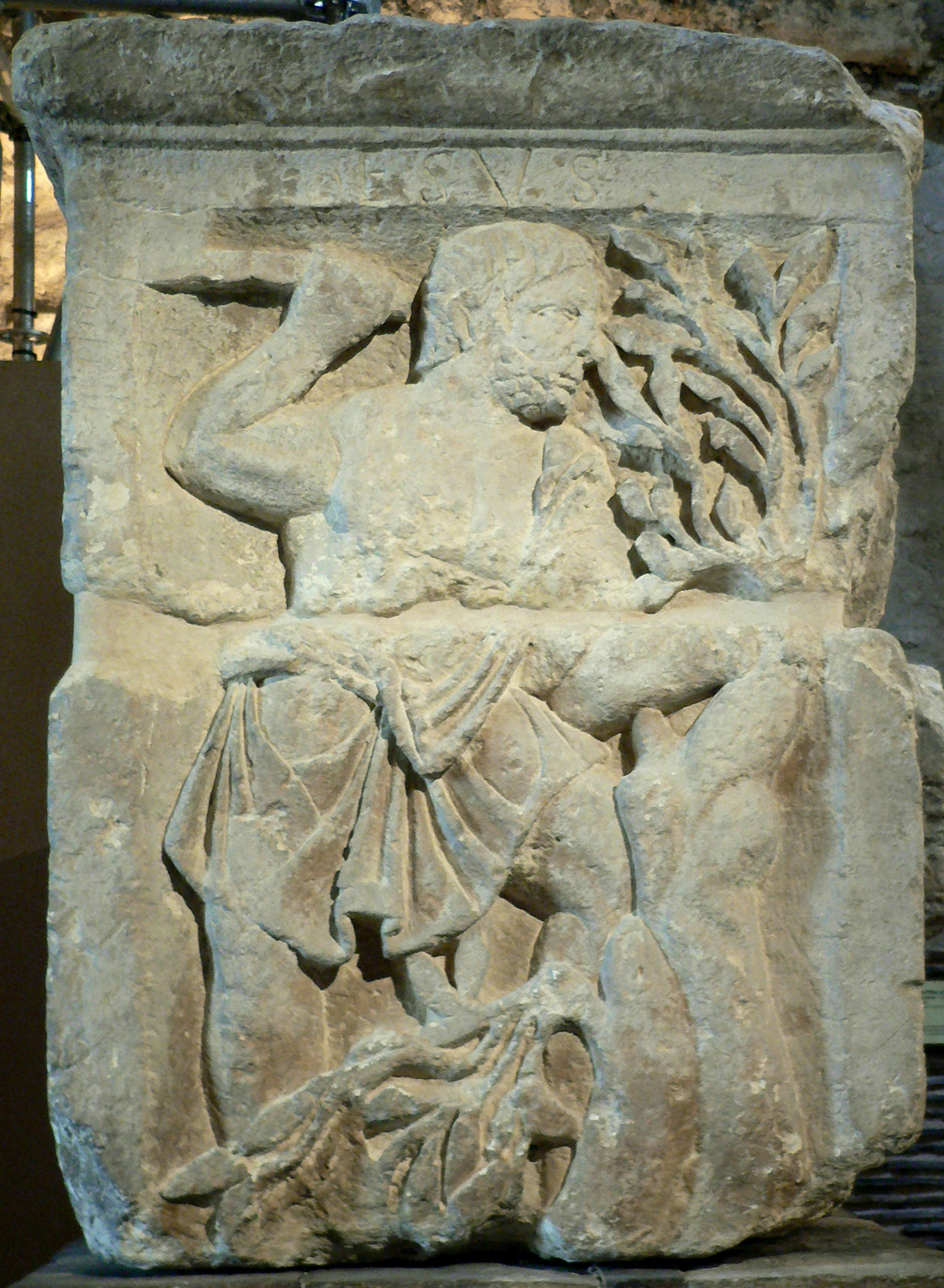
A piece of the Boatmen's Pillar, 1st century, limestone (Île-de-France)

Much of the ancient collections is placed in the frigidarium. It contains artifacts dating as far back as the romanization of the city of Parisii, such as the famous Pillar of the Boatmen from the 1st century. This pillar was offered to the emperor Tiberius by the boatmen of Paris. It contains inscriptions dedicated to the Roman god Jupiter as well as Celtic references, making it a significant example of the two cultures melding together on one artifact. It was discovered in the 18th century, under the choir of Notre-Dame de Paris. Another ancient artifact that can be seen in the frigidarium is the Saint-Landry pillar. This pillar was sculpted in the second century on l'Île-de-la-Cité, and was discovered during the 19th century.

There is more ancient art outside of the frigidarium, including two lion heads made from rock crystal. The lion heads were made between the 4th and the 5th centuries in the Roman Empire. Although their purpose is not known, the most likely hypothesis is that they were made to decorate an imperial throne.

==== Beyond France ====
The Cluny also houses ancient Coptic art, including a linen medallion of Jason and Medea.

Between 1858 and 1860, twenty-six Visigoth crowns were discovered (the Treasure of Guarrazar). This was one of the most important discoveries related to the Visigothic Kingdom of Hispania. Of the original twenty-six crowns, there are 10 left today. The remaining crowns have been spread between two museums: the Palacio Real de Madrid and the Cluny. Today, the Cluny holds three of these crowns, as well as crosses, pendants and hanging chains from the same discovery. These items were symbols of royal power and date back to the 7th century. They were most likely offered to the religious establishments in Toledo, the then capital of Spain.

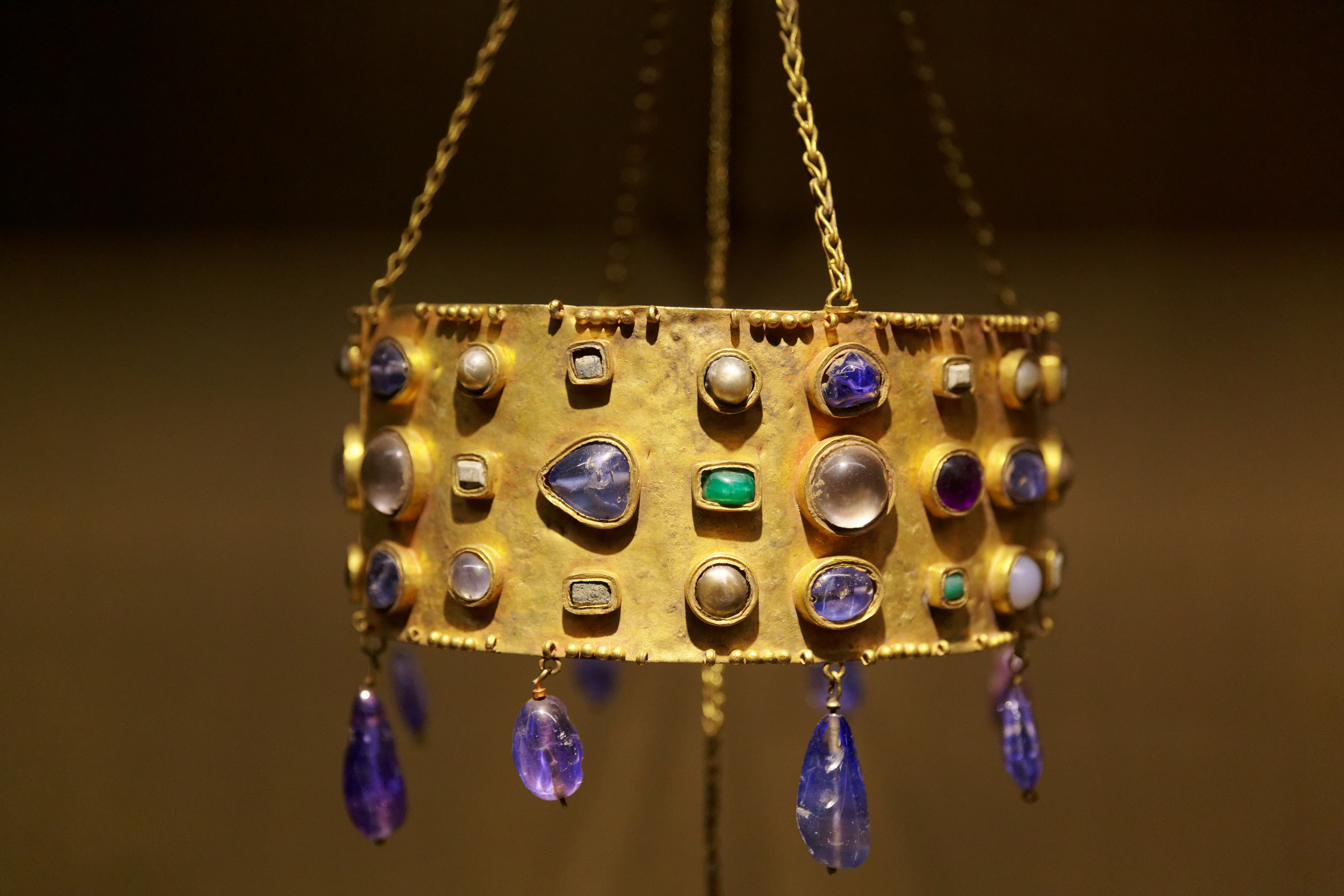
One of the Visigoth crowns. Spain, 7th century (gold, sapphires, pearls)

=== Byzantine art ===
Starting with the founding of the city in Constantinople in 330, the emperor Constantine began an era known as the Byzantine period. Between 843 and the fall of the Byzantine empire in 1204, the politics and art of this empire flourished. During this part of the Middle Ages in the West, the Byzantine art was a link to traditional literature, philosophy and Greco-Roman art.

One example is the noteworthy ivory sculpture from Constantinople called Ariane. Ariane dates back to the first half of the 6th century and was most likely produced to adorn a piece of furniture. The statue includes Ariane, fauns and a few Angels of Love. It is one of the most iconic examples of Byzantine ivory work.

Another famous piece of Byzantine ivory found in the Cluny is the plaque that depicts the crowning of Otto II. His father Otto I was crowned king of Rome on February 2, 962. This crowning marks the beginning of a renaissance in this part of Western Europe. Similar to Charlemagne, Otto I later took the title of Emperor Augustus. In 972, the emperor Otto II married the princess Théophano, who became the empress of Rome and can be seen in the ivory plaque as well.

The Cluny also possesses a Byzantine coffer that contains mythological images and was produced around the year 1000. It was at this time that the Macedonian emperors ruled in Constantinople.

=== Romanesque art ===
The term "Roman" art first appeared in 1818. It was used by Charles de Gerville to describe the art that comes after the Carolingian empire, but before Gothic art. Before the 19th century, most of the art from the Middle Ages was referred to as Gothic art. Romanesque art is defined by its use of light and color. The Romanesque artists are masters of volume and contrast. The paintings are relatively simple, focusing on the narrative. From the Romanesque period onward, reliquaries and other religious artifacts were no longer kept in crypts, and instead were displayed on the altars in churches. Visibility of faith was of the utmost importance at this time.

==== In France ====
There are two central elements to Romanesque art: pedagogy and devotion. The evolution of faith is a common theme of these works. One example in the Cluny today is a capital that was made in Paris between 1030 and 1040. Referred to as the Majestic Christ capital, it was created for the Saint-Germain-des-Prés church, the product of a collaboration between two workshops. The Cluny also houses a series of twelve capitals from Saint-Germain-des-Prés made in the beginning of the 11th century.

==== Beyond France ====
The Cluny possesses Romanesque art from other countries as well, such as England, Italy and Spain. One of the more famous examples is the English crosier from the middle of the 12th century. This piece, made from ivory, displays multiple eagles and lions. Another famous work in ivory is the Italian 'Olifant' from the end of the 11th century. This piece was created from an elephant tusk and depicts the scene of Jesus' Ascension.

There are also Romanesque art pieces from Catalonia at the Cluny. There is a series of eight capitals that come from the Saint Pere de Rodes church. One of the capitals depicts the Biblical story of Noah and another details the story of Abraham. Another piece from Catalonia is a statue of a female saint made from wood that dating to the second half of the 12th century.

=== Work from Limoges ===
The Cluny houses many pieces from the famous enamel and gold workshops of Limoges. These workshops first started producing pieces in the second quarter of the 12th century. Limoges is located in the southwestern, central part of France; its gold and enameled masterpieces were collected throughout Europe by the end of the 12th century. The goldsmiths and other artists produced varying kinds of products including crosses, shrines, altarpieces, candlesticks and much more. They tended to be religious in nature.

One of the reasons that pieces from these workshops were so successful is because the materials were affordable. As such, they were able to produce in mass. Not only were they producing a lot of products, but products of quality as well. The colors were vivid and the subject matter was depicted with eloquence.

There are many pieces from Limoges at the Cluny today. Most notably are the two copper plaques from around the year 1190. One depicts the image of Saint Étienne and the other portrays the Three Wisemen. These two plaques decorated the main altar at Grandmont Abbey. The adoration of the Three Wisemen was a popular theme in pieces from Limoges and can be found in many of their works. A copper shrine from the year 1200 also depicts this theme.

=== Gothic art from France ===
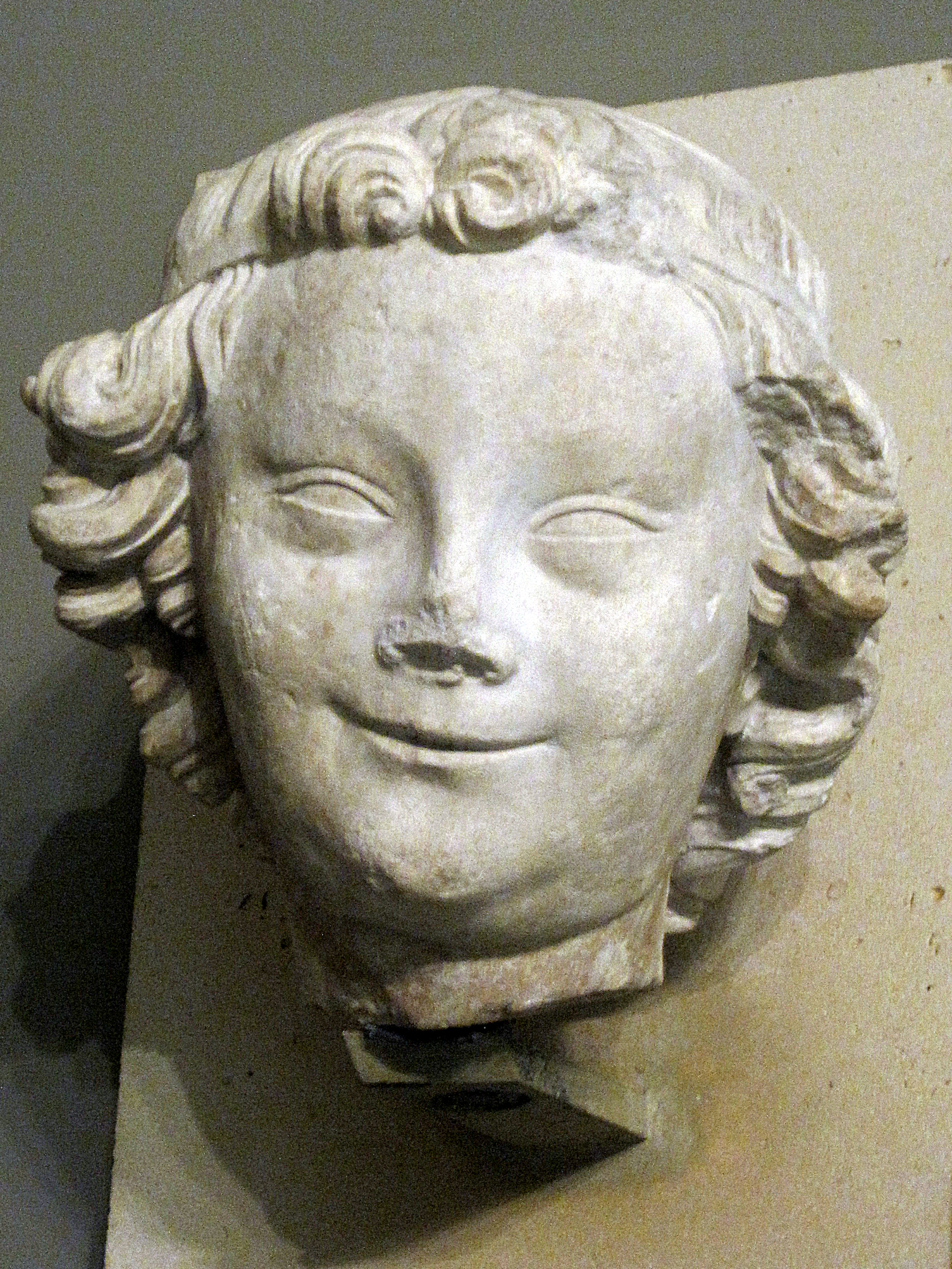
Angel's head, after 1207, Priorale church of Saint-Louis-de-Passy.

The 1120s in Paris saw many changes in art and education. One theme that became vitally important in both arenas was the importance of light. The teachings of Plato and his student Platin emphasize the importance of light in the Creation story. This has parallels in changes happening architecturally in Paris at the same time. Supporting beams and arches are thinned to allow more space for windows to allow in more light. The Sainte-Chapelle, with its tall and beautiful stained glass windows, displays this change in architecture. The upper cathedral has 15 window bays that encircle the entire room, each 50 feet tall, giving the illusion that the visitor is surrounded by light.

Artists in 12th century Paris experimented artistically, exploring a new conception of space and the relationship between architecture, sculpture and stained glass, as seen in the Sainte-Chapelle. The Cluny houses many examples of this experimentation, such as 'double' capitals and statues that function as columns. There is a double capital that depicts two harpies facing each other that comes from the church at Saint-Denis, made between 1140 and 1145. Another artifact from Saint-Denis is the head from a statue-column of Queen Saba. This statue-column was produced in the 12th century.

The Cluny also has one of the most vast collections of stained-glass in France. Their collection includes 230 panels, medallions and fragments from the 12th century to the 14th. Sainte-Chapelle has donated some panels from their iconic stained-glass windows to the Cluny as well, including one panel that depicts the scene of Sampson and the lion.

If the 12th century was all about experimentation, the 13th and 14th centuries in Paris represent artistic maturity. It is at this time that the demand for non-religious art increases. There are two themes that dominate Parisian art in the 13th century: an interest in Antiquity and a new attention given to nature. One of the most famous examples at the Cluny is the statue of Adam made from limestone. Produced around 1260 in Paris, the statue depicts a nude Adam, who is covering himself with the leaves from a small tree. The influence of Antiquity is evident in this work.

Sainte-Chapelle not only donated pieces of stained-glass to the Cluny, but also six statues of apostles made from limestone. These statues were once located on the pillars of the upper chapel in Sainte-Chapelle, but can be seen in the Cluny today. These statues were made in the 1320s and originally came from Saint-Jacques aux Pèlerins. These statues mark the peak of Parisian art from the middle of the 13th century.

=== 15th-century art ===
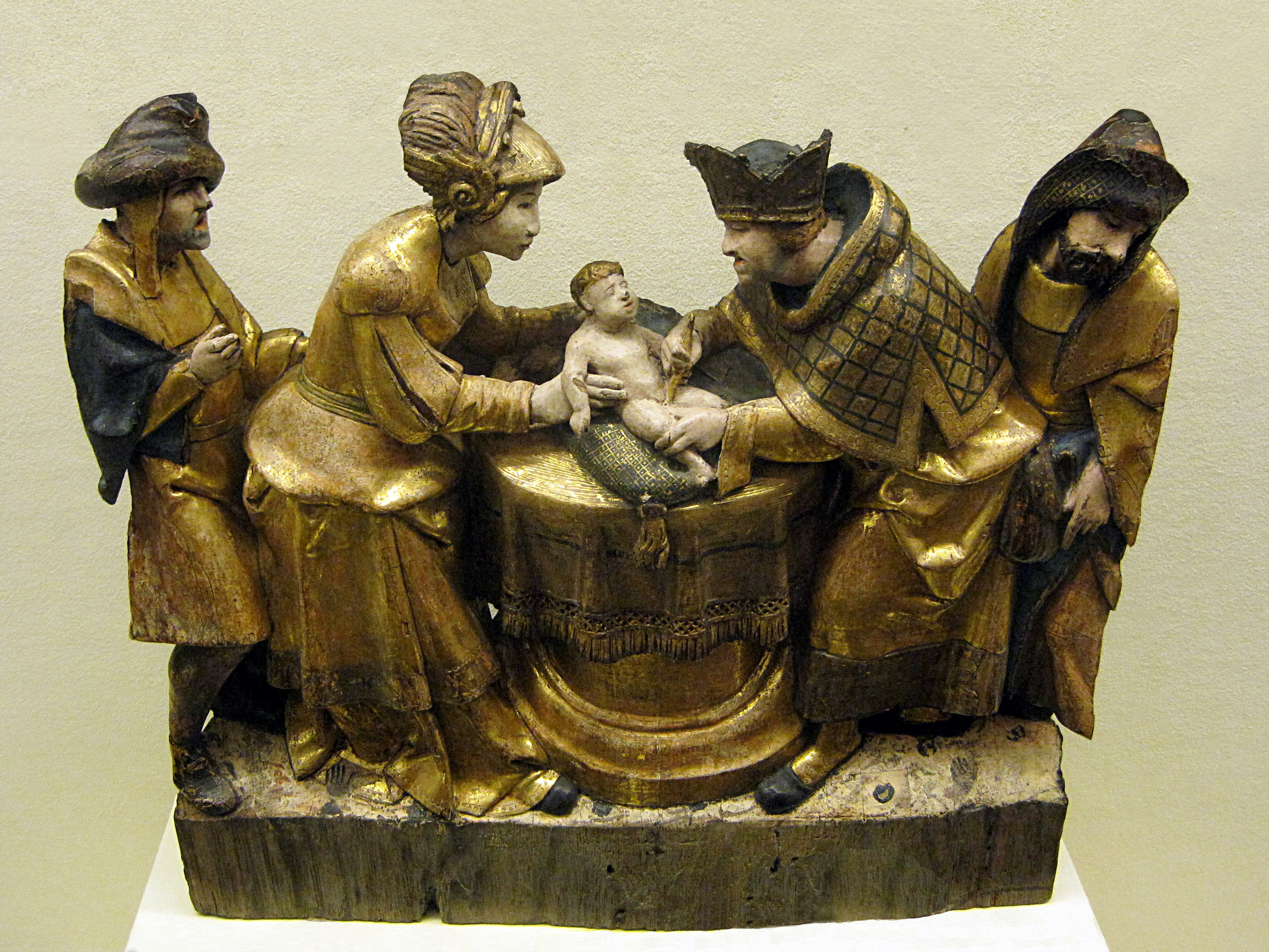
The circumcision of Christ, made during the first quarter of the 16th century in Antwerp.

In the 15th century, the opulence of urban elites encouraged artistic production as the demand for art increased. People began ordering artistic objects for everyday life, such as furniture, tapestries, ceramics, game pieces, etc. It is at this time that Paris became a capital of luxury. Here various artistic movements converged to create an 'international' gothic style. Artists began to sign their work, no longer desiring to remain anonymous.

This phenomenon is particularly evident in the considerable rise in demand for tapestries. The most famous tapestries at the Cluny today are that of the Lady and the Unicorn (La Dame à la licorne) series. There are six tapestries that make up this collection, each one representing a different sense. There are the five main senses (smell, hearing, taste, touch and sight) and it is the sixth tapestry that depicts the Lady with the Unicorn. The mysterious meaning of this sixth has produced multiple interpretations over the years. The most commonly embraced interpretation understands the Lady as representing It a sixth sense of morality or spirituality, as she puts aside her worldly wealth.

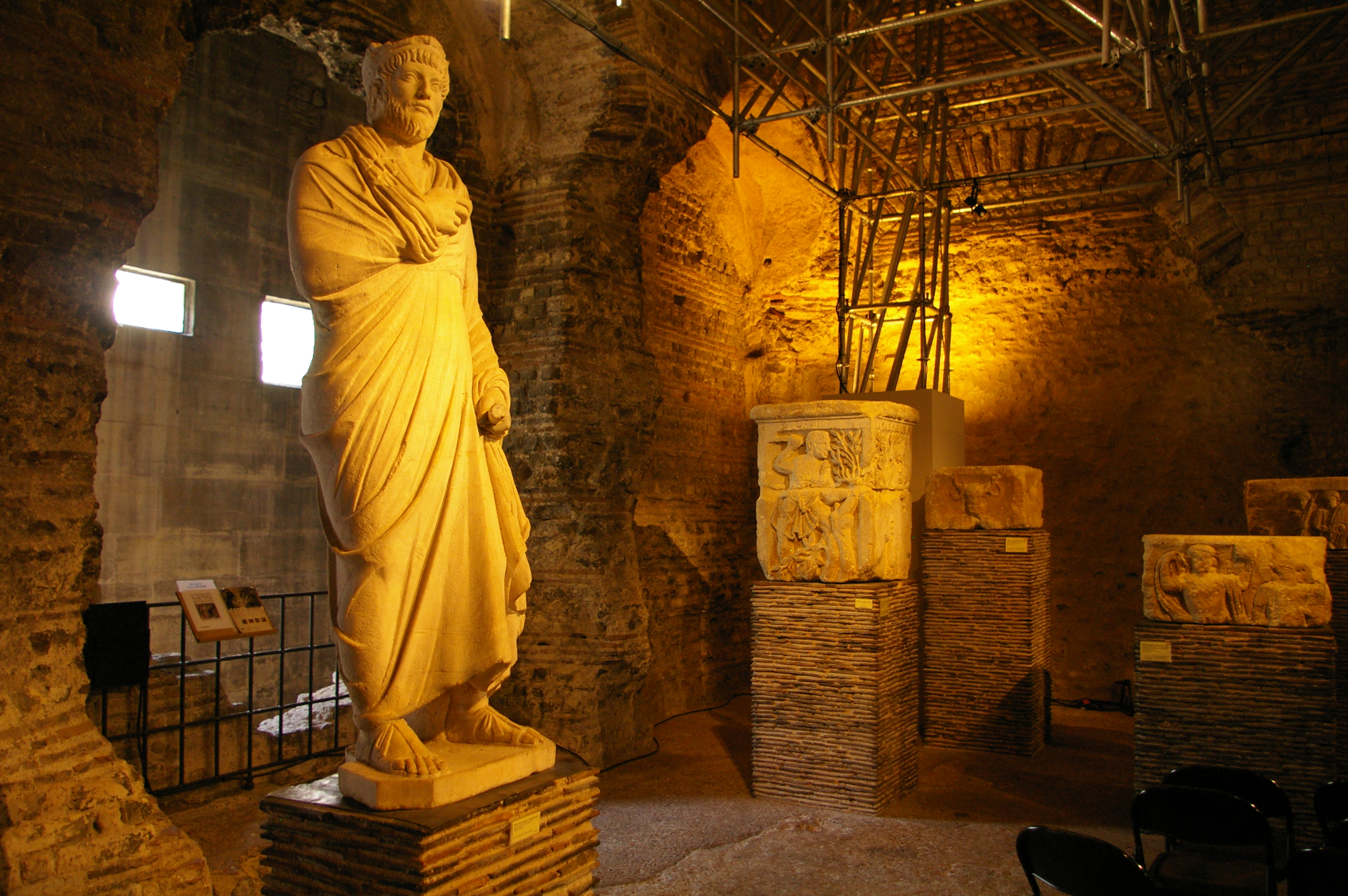
Statue of a Roman priest, traditionally known as a portrait of Emperor Julian

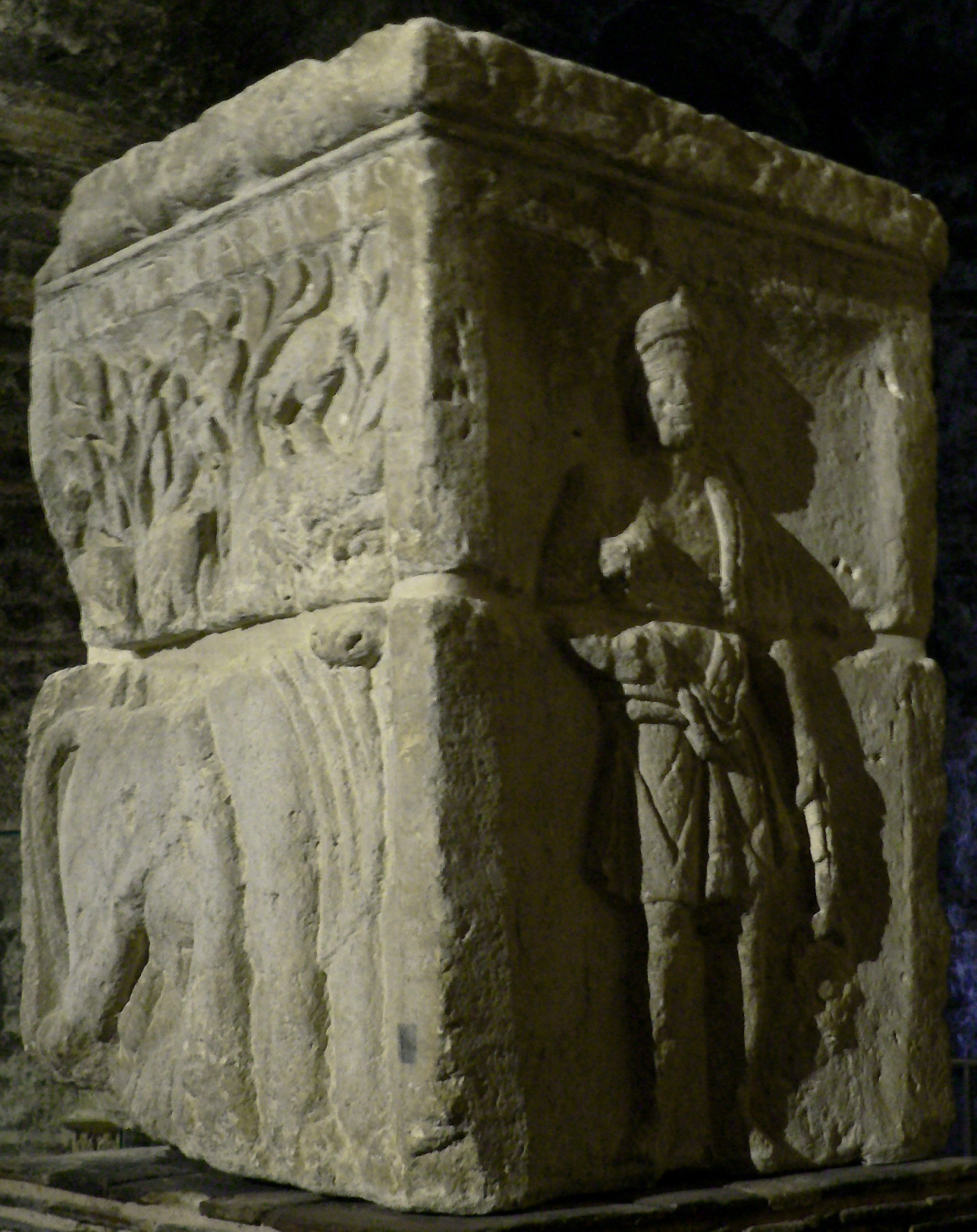
Element of the Pillar of the Boatmen, first quarter of the 1st century AD

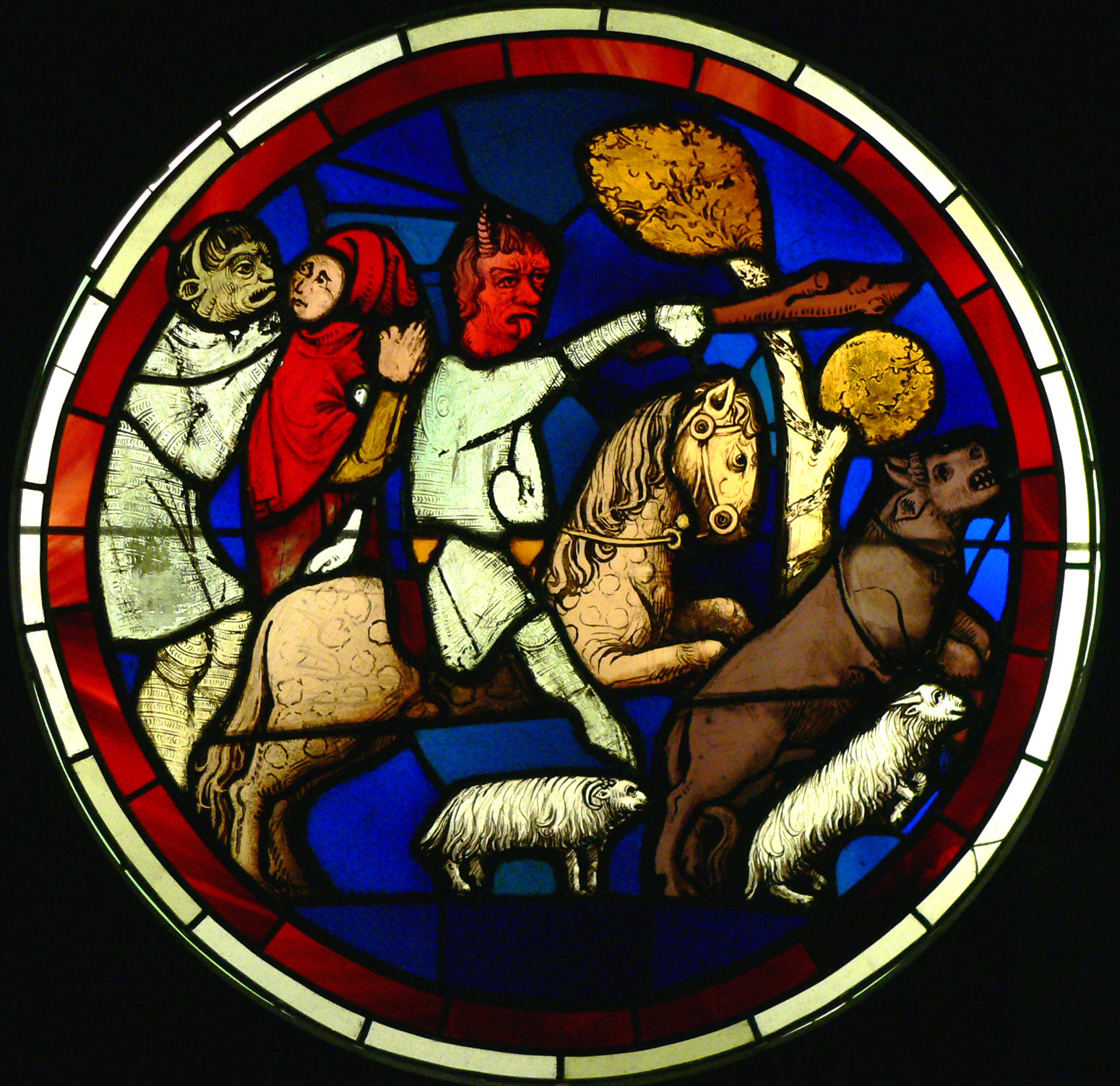
The Devil and a woman, stained glass, before 1248, from the Sainte-Chapelle

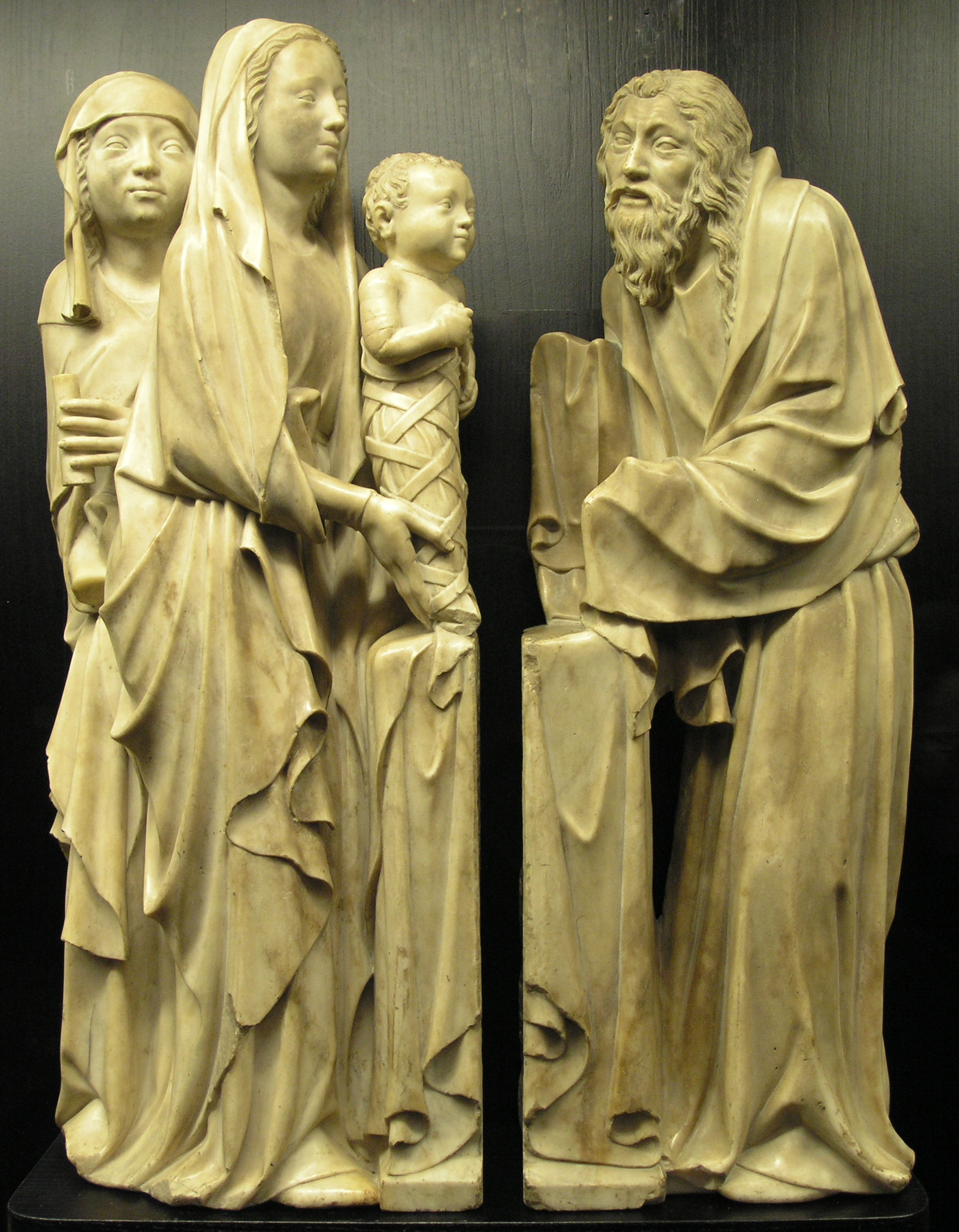
Marble sculpture of the Presentation at the Temple, Burgundy, late 14th century

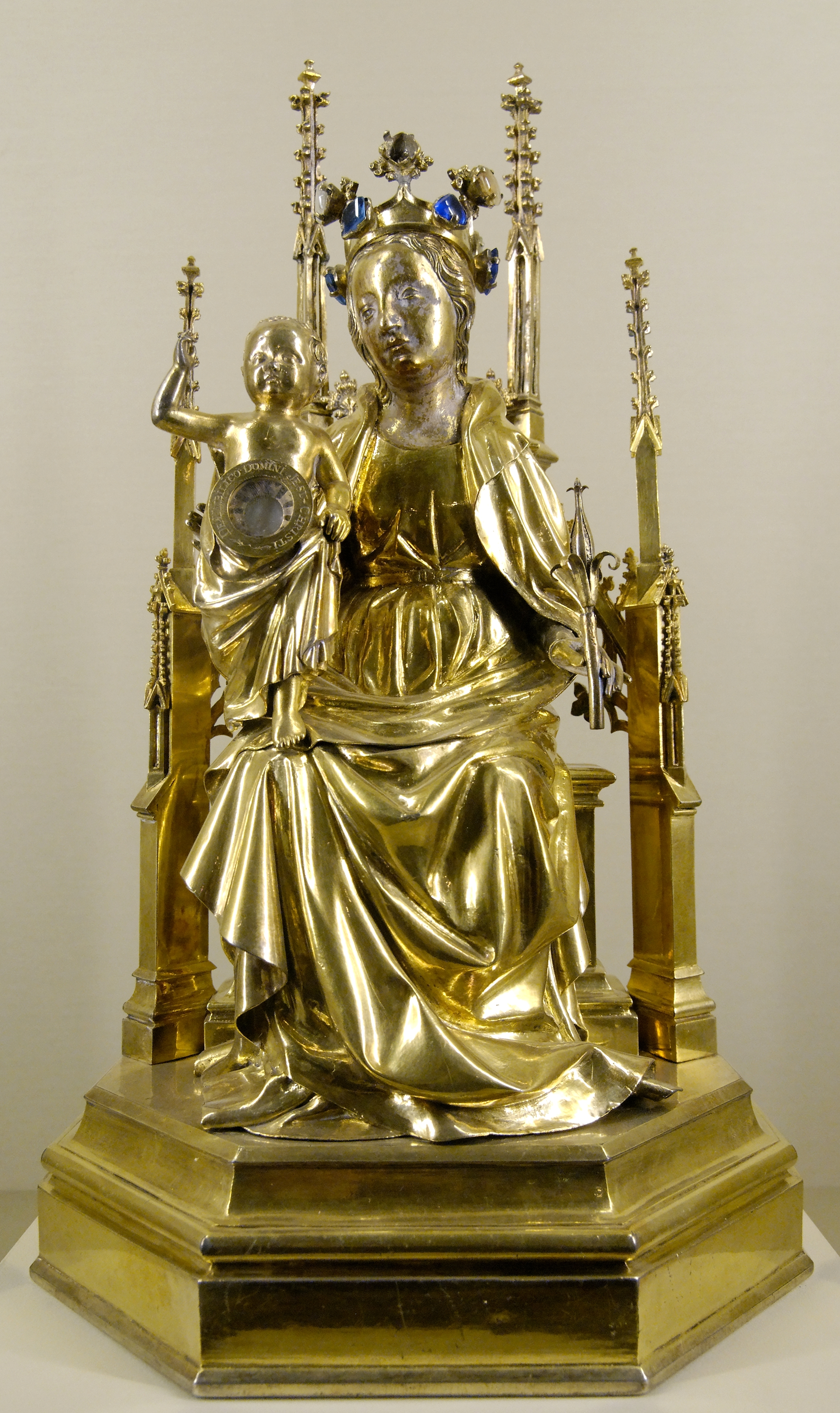
Reliquary of the Holy Umbilical Cord : Virgin and Child, gilded silver, France (Paris ?), 1407

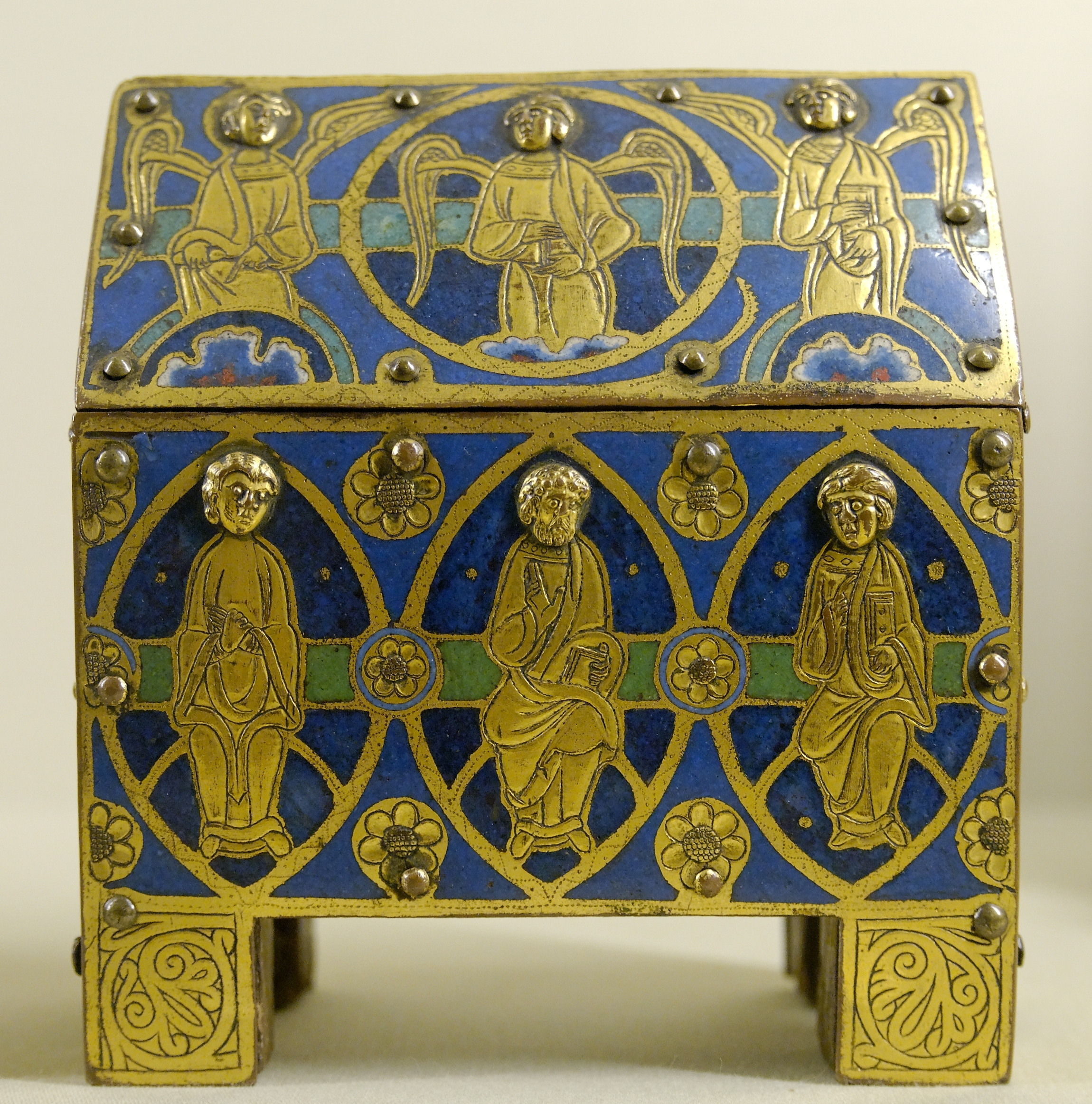
Casket : Apostles and angels, gilded champlevé Limoges enamel, 2nd quarter of the 13th century

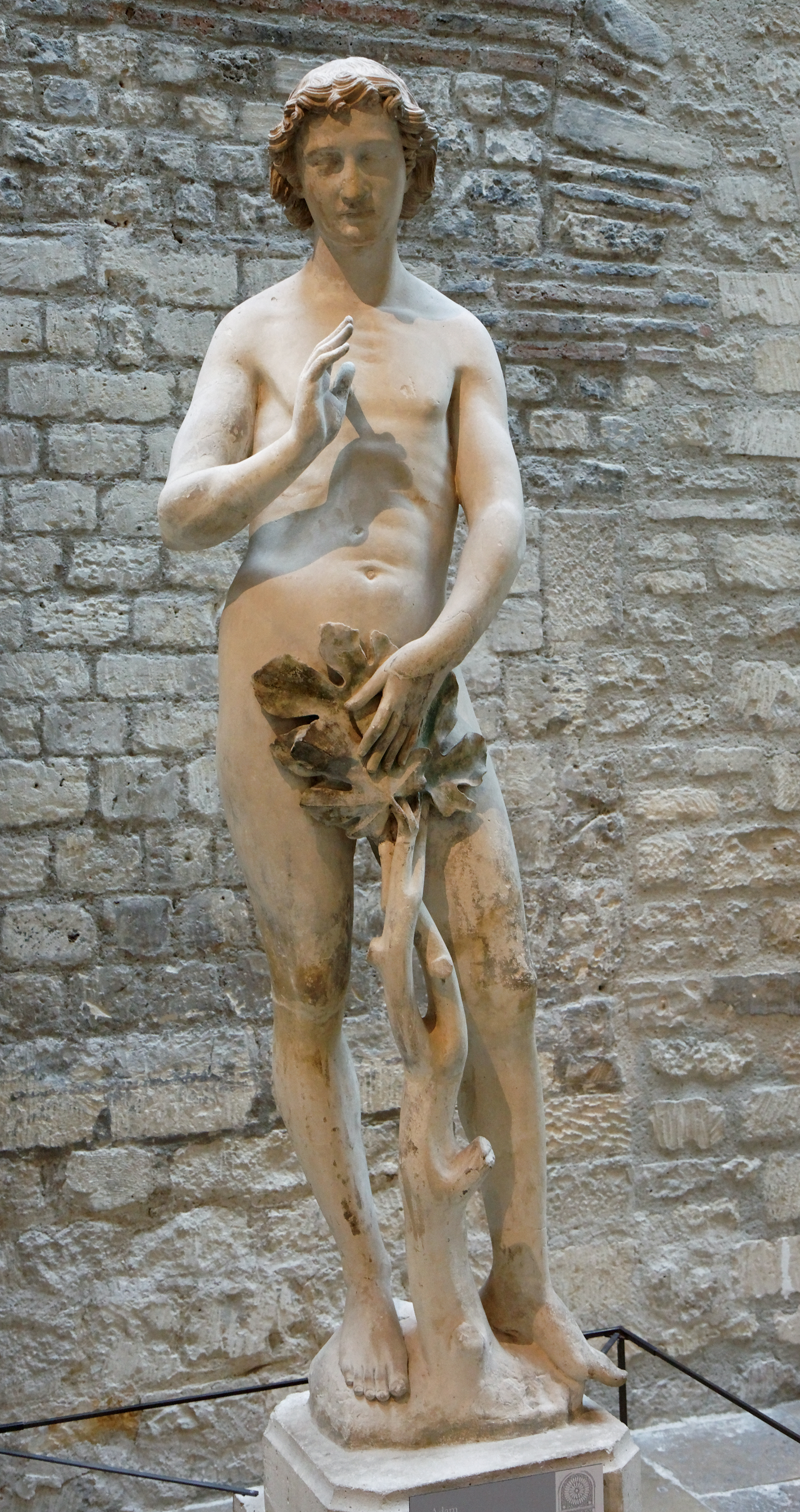
Adam, stone, Paris, around 1260, from the interior of the south transept of Notre-Dame de Paris

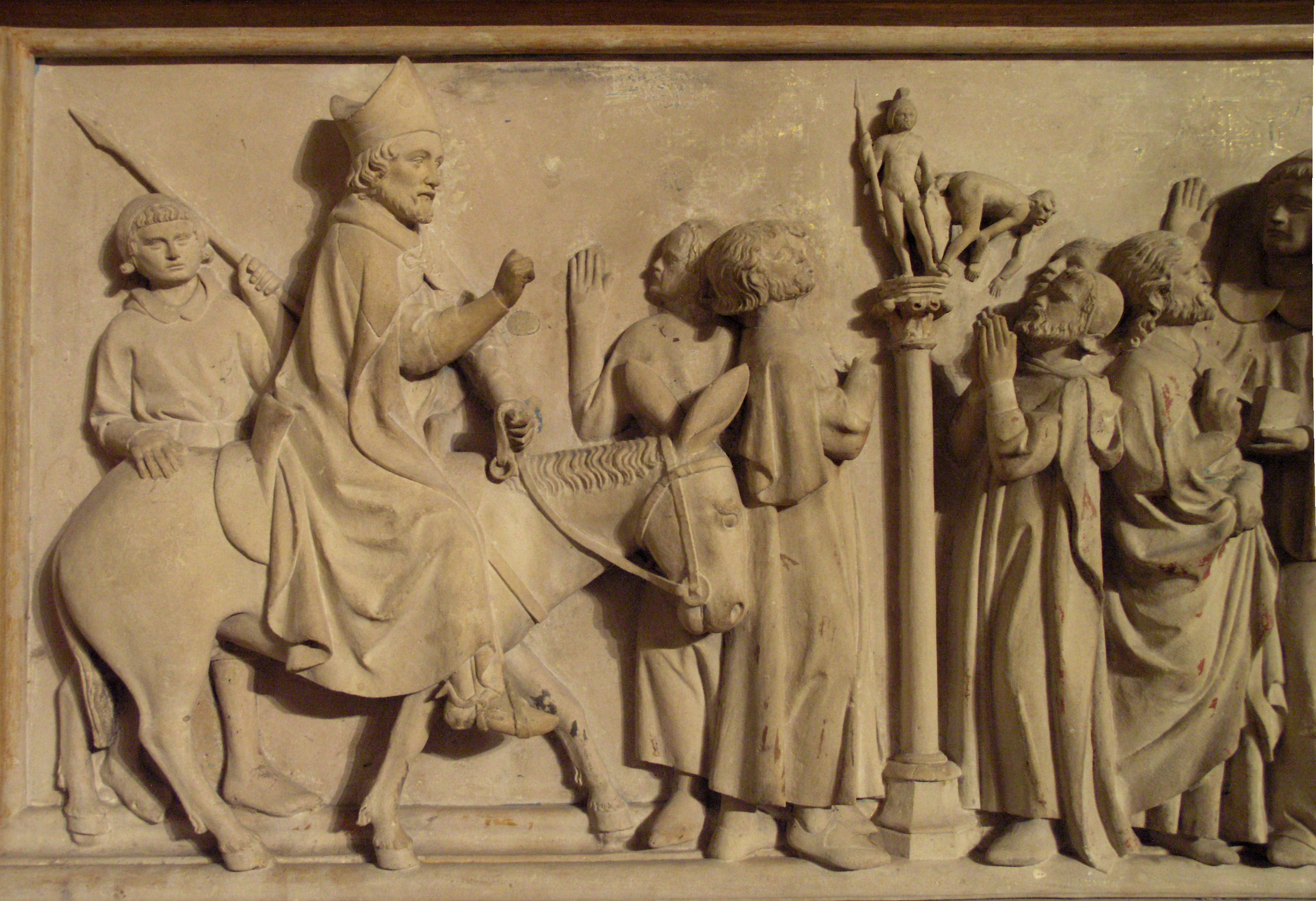
Altarpiece of the Abbey of Saint-Denis, around 1250–1260, episodes of the life of Saint Benedict

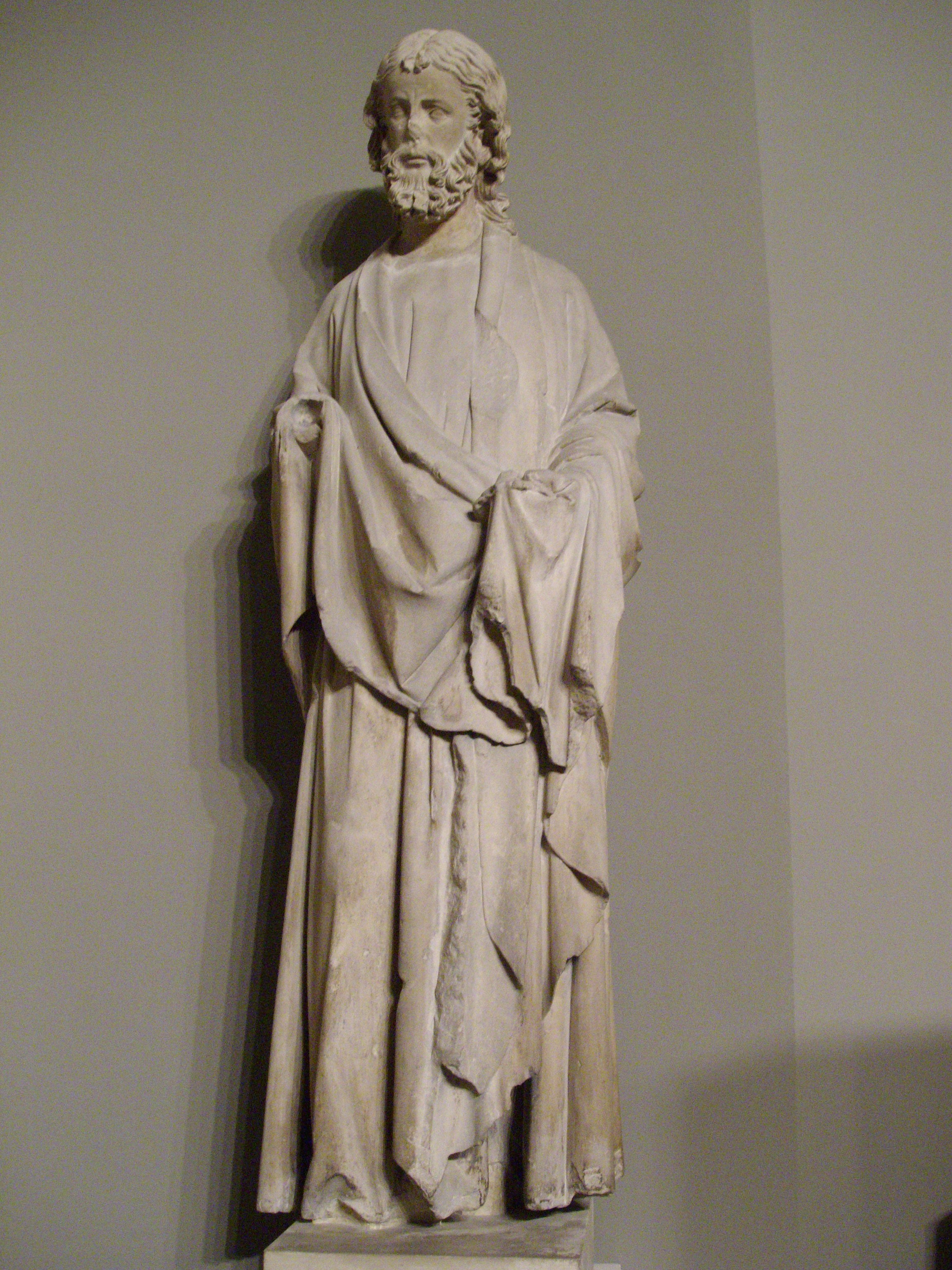
« Melancholic » Apostle, stone, around 1243–1248, from the interior decor of the Sainte-Chapelle

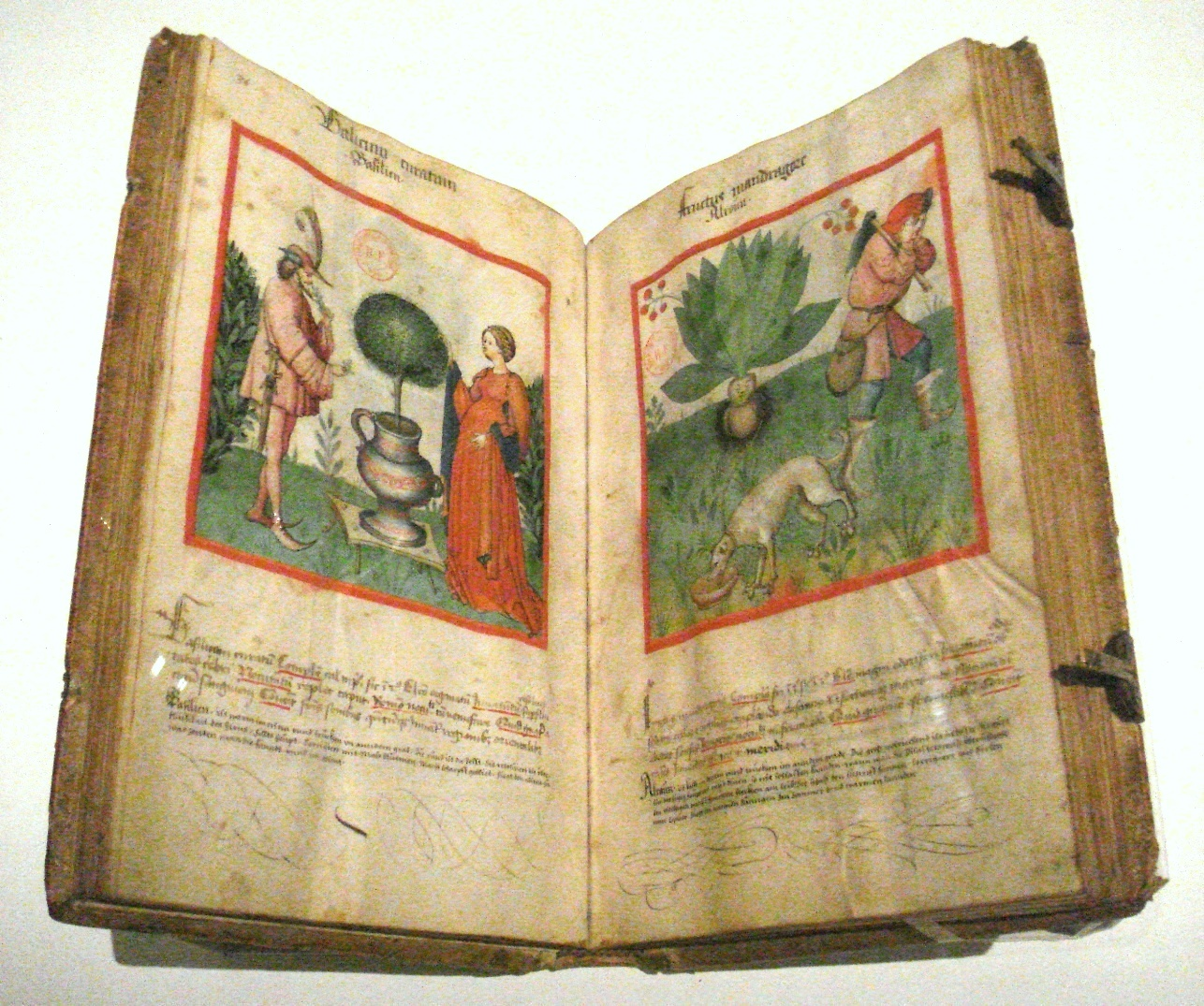
Illustrated Tacuinum Sanitatis of Ibn Butlan, Rhineland, 2nd half of 15th century

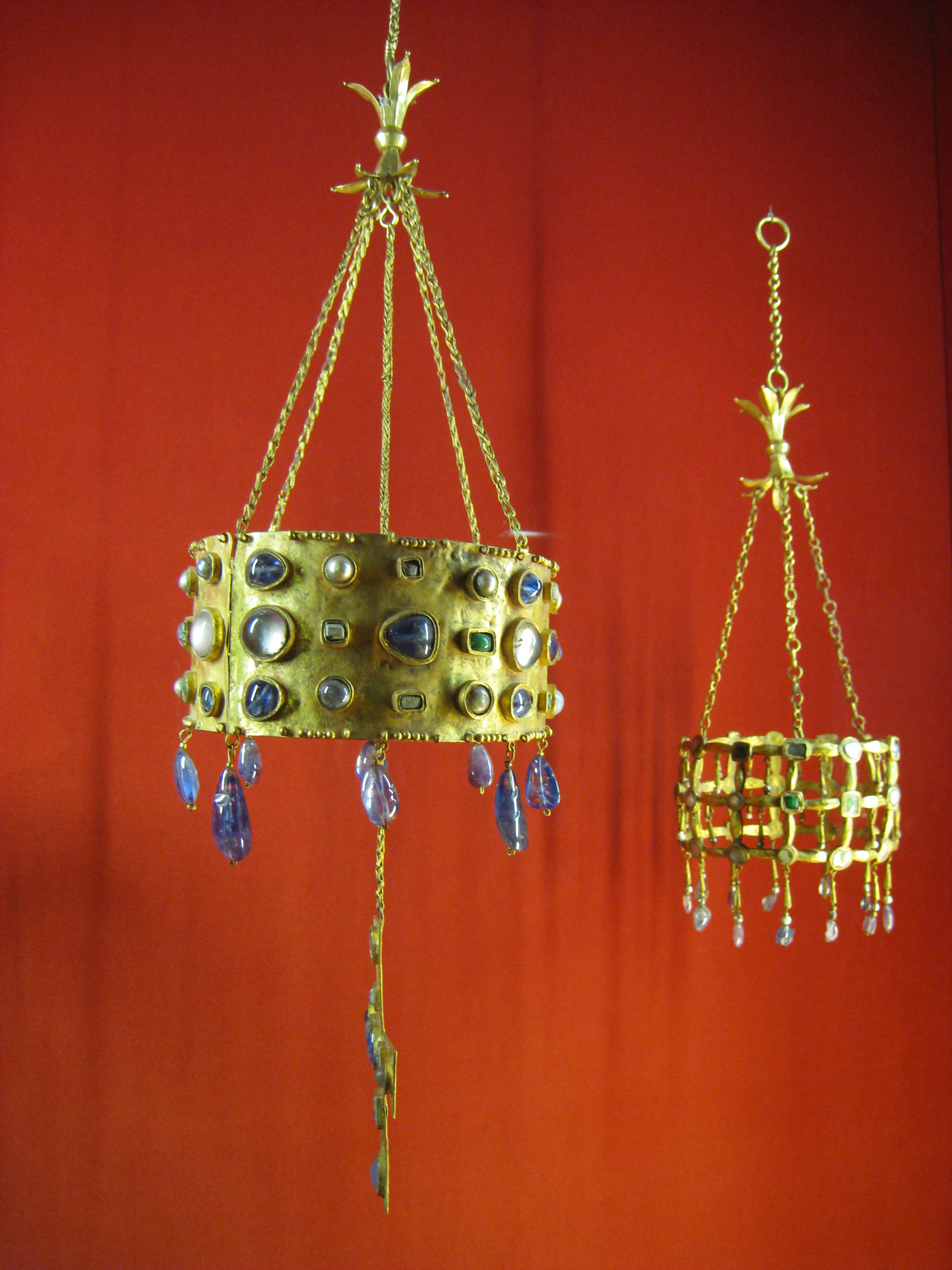
Visigothic votive crowns from the Treasure of Guarrazar, Spain, 7th century

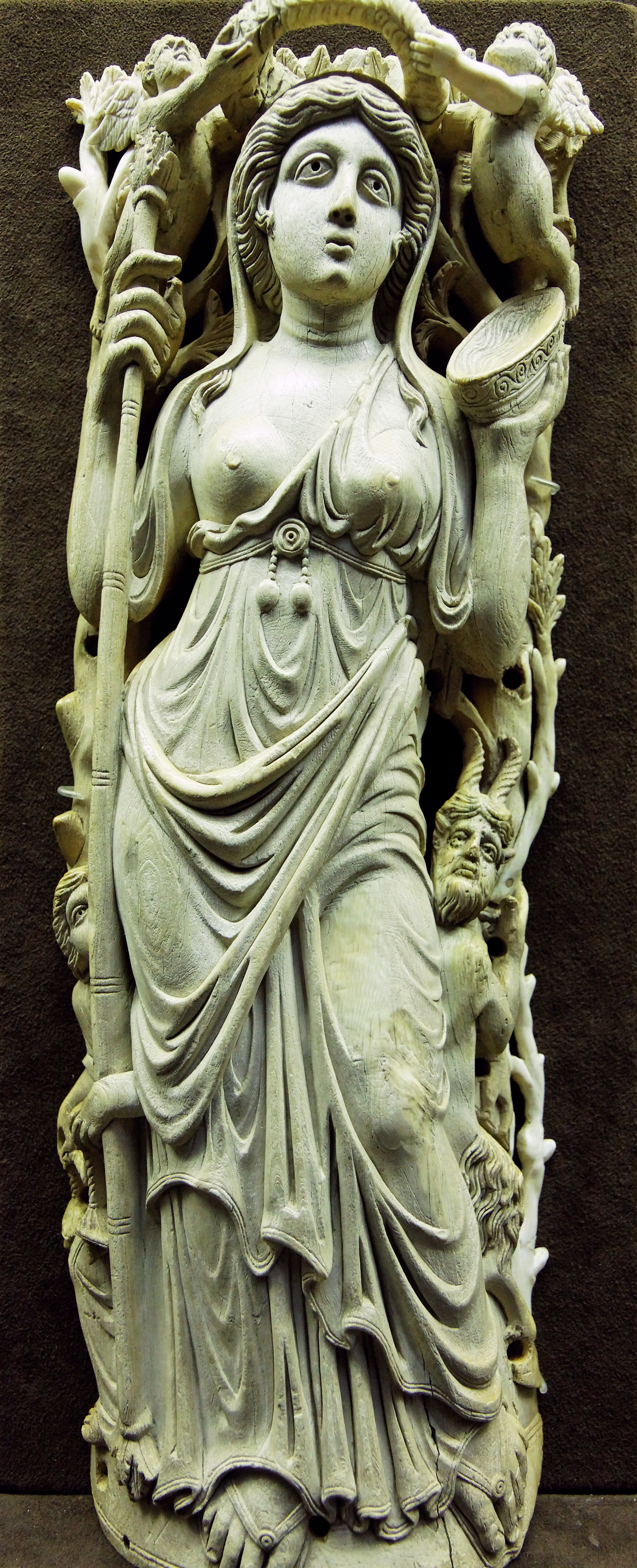
Ivory binding of Ariadne with Maenad, Satyr and Cupids, Constantinople, 6th century

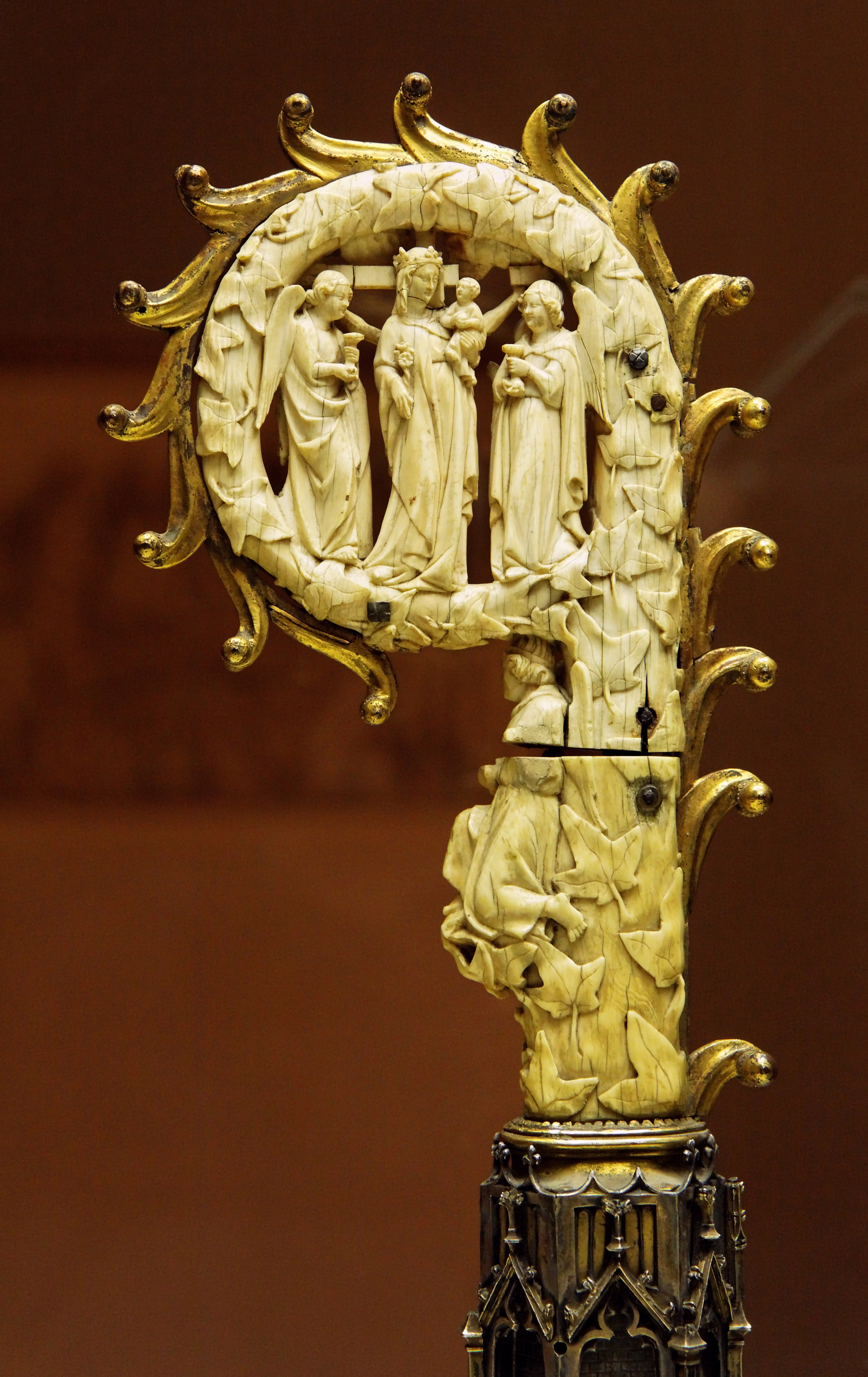
Ivory crosier, Virgin and child with two angels, around 1300

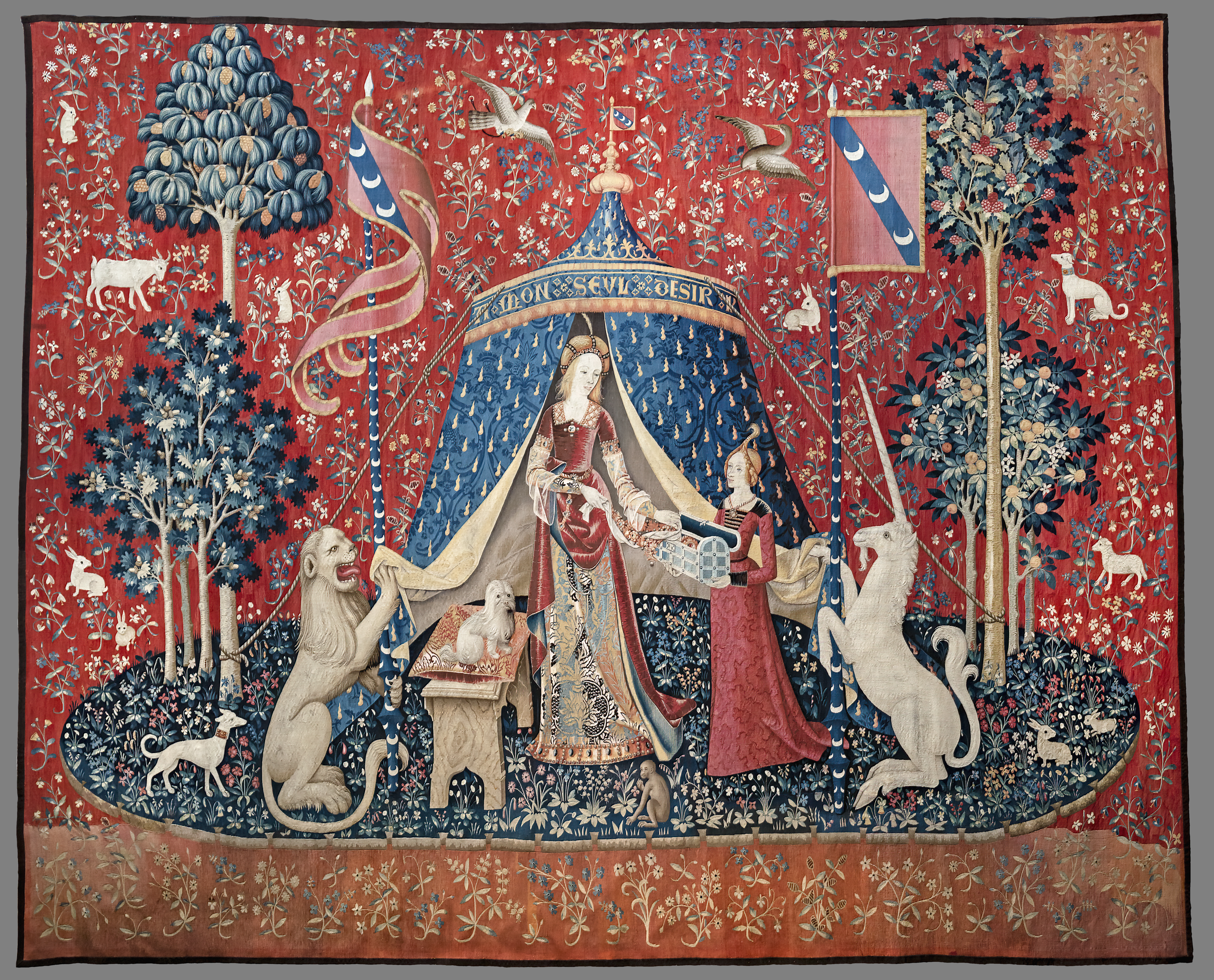
Tapestry of The Lady and the Unicorn, A mon seul désir, late 15th century.

Tapestry of The Lady and the Unicorn, Hearing

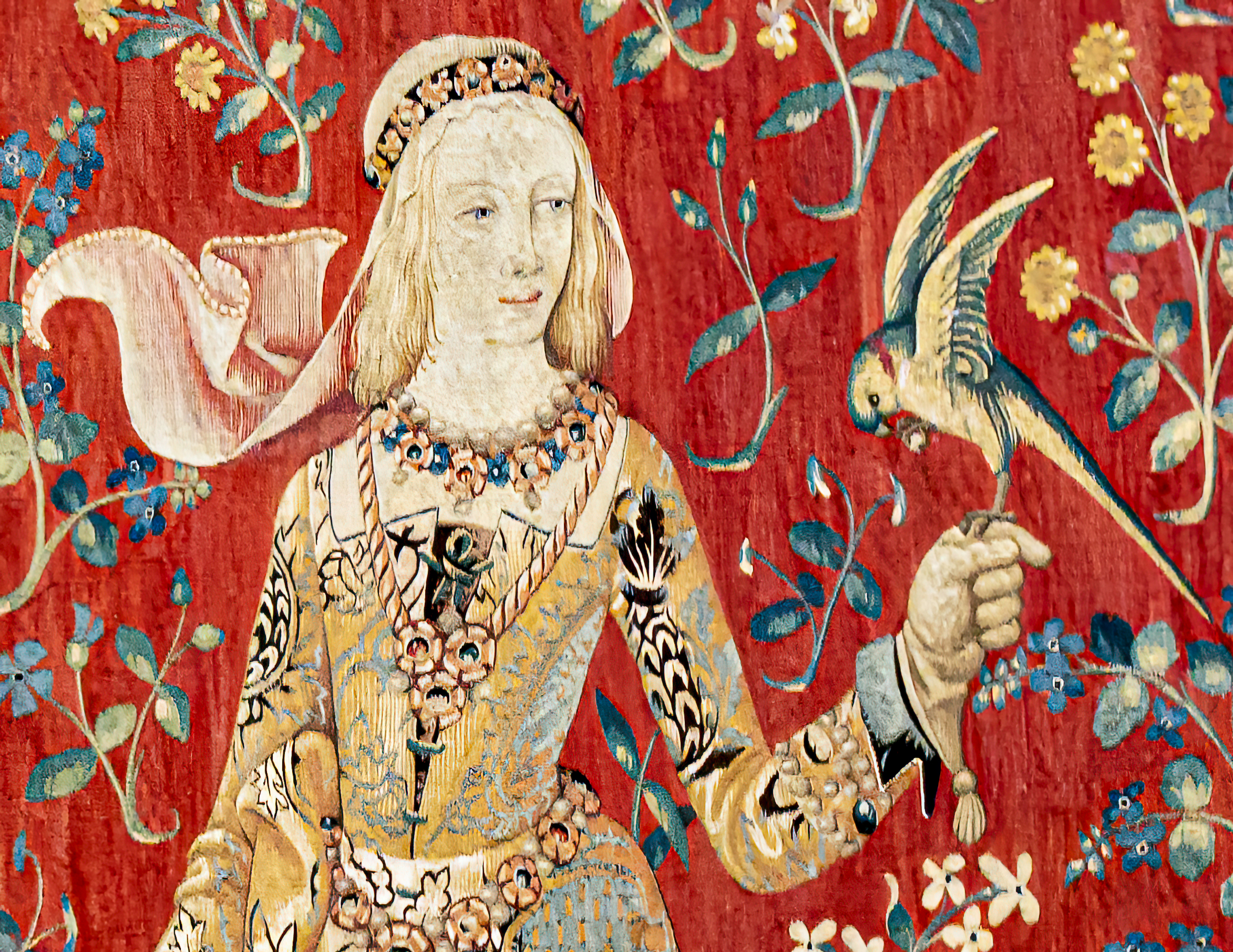
Tapestry of The Lady and the Unicorn, Taste, detail

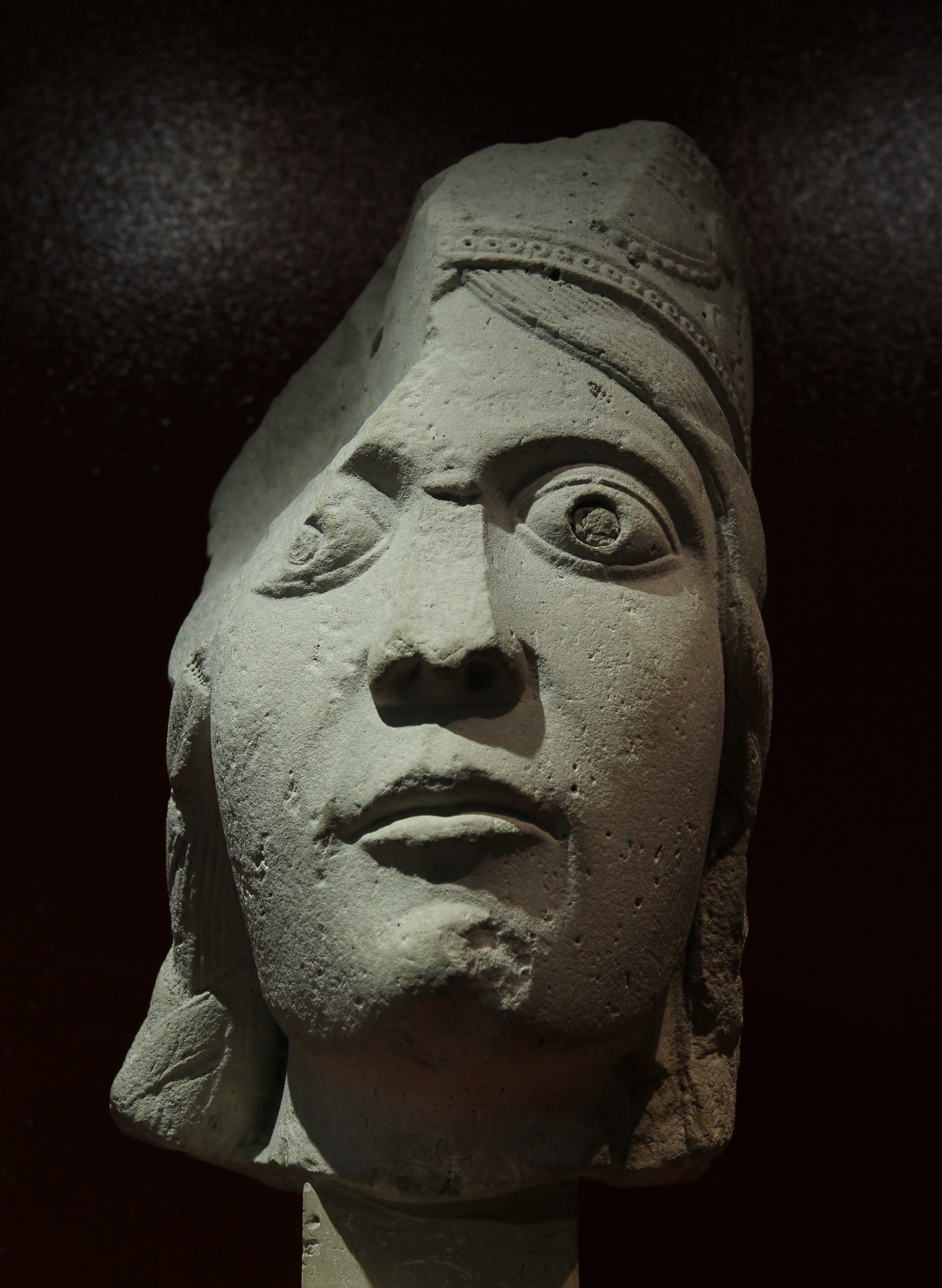
Head of the Queen of Sheba statue-column, limestone, 1137–1140. From the Saint-Denis church.

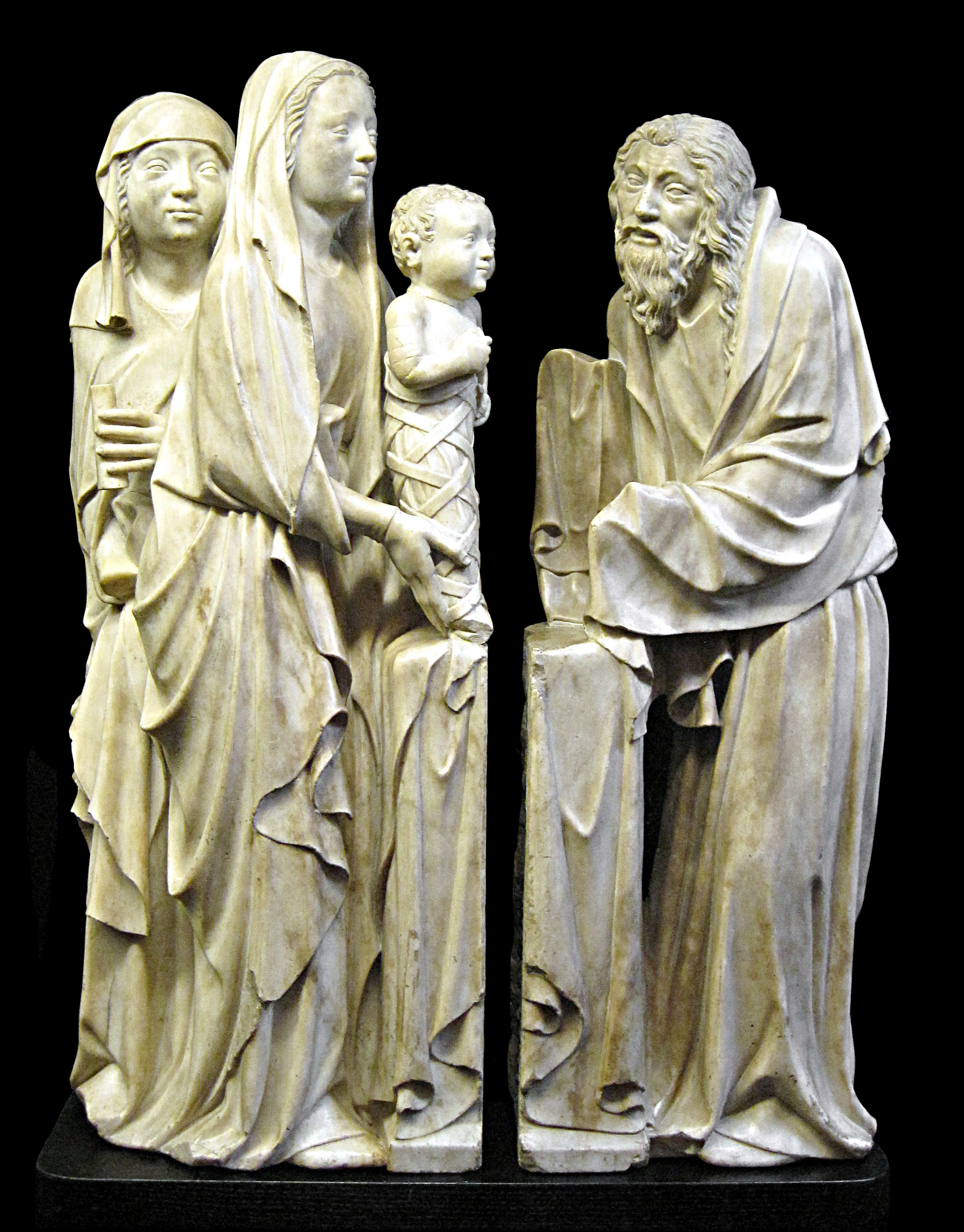
The Presentation in the Temple, made during the second half of the 14th century,

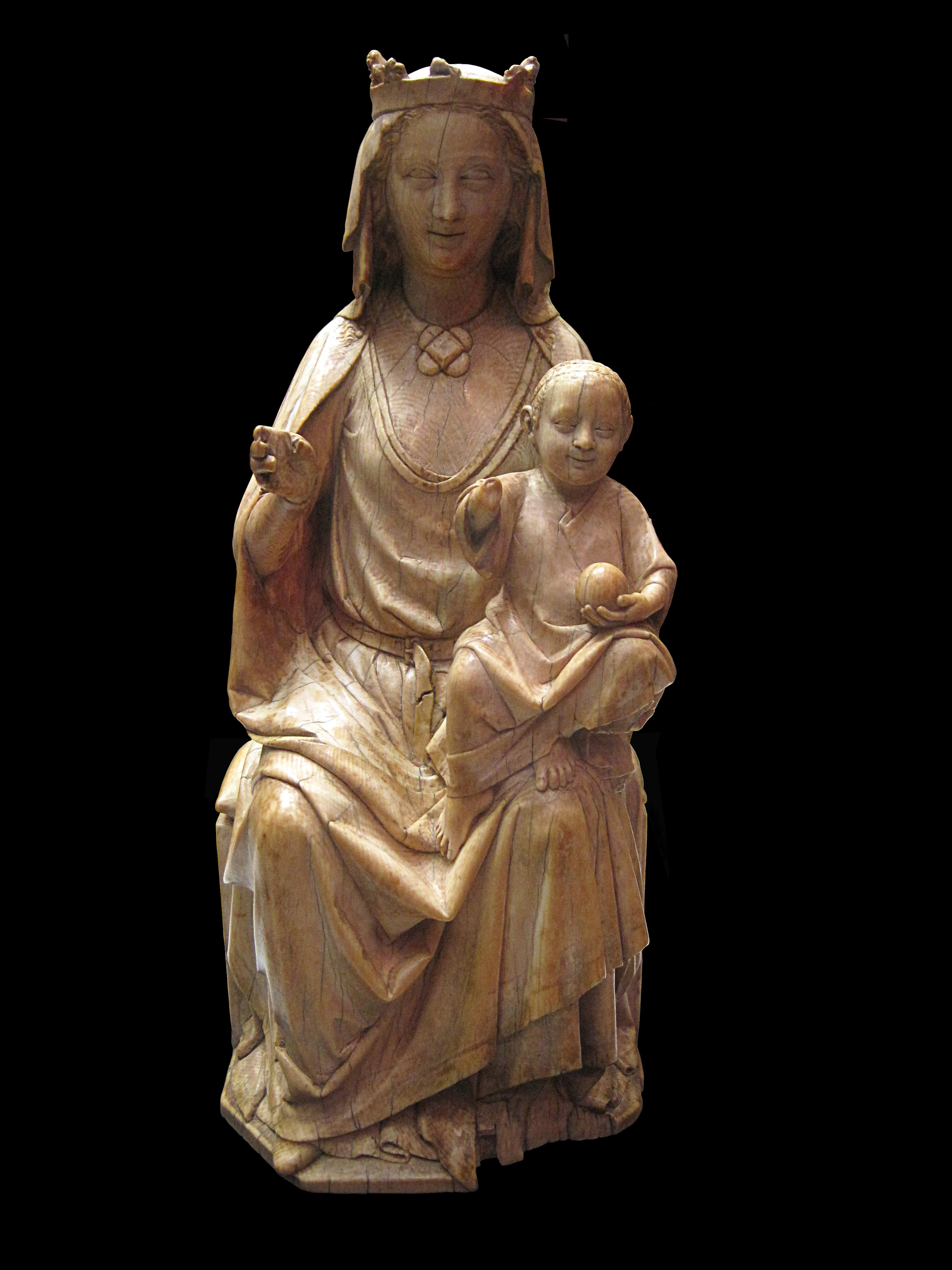
Madonna and Child, made around 1240–1250 in Paris.

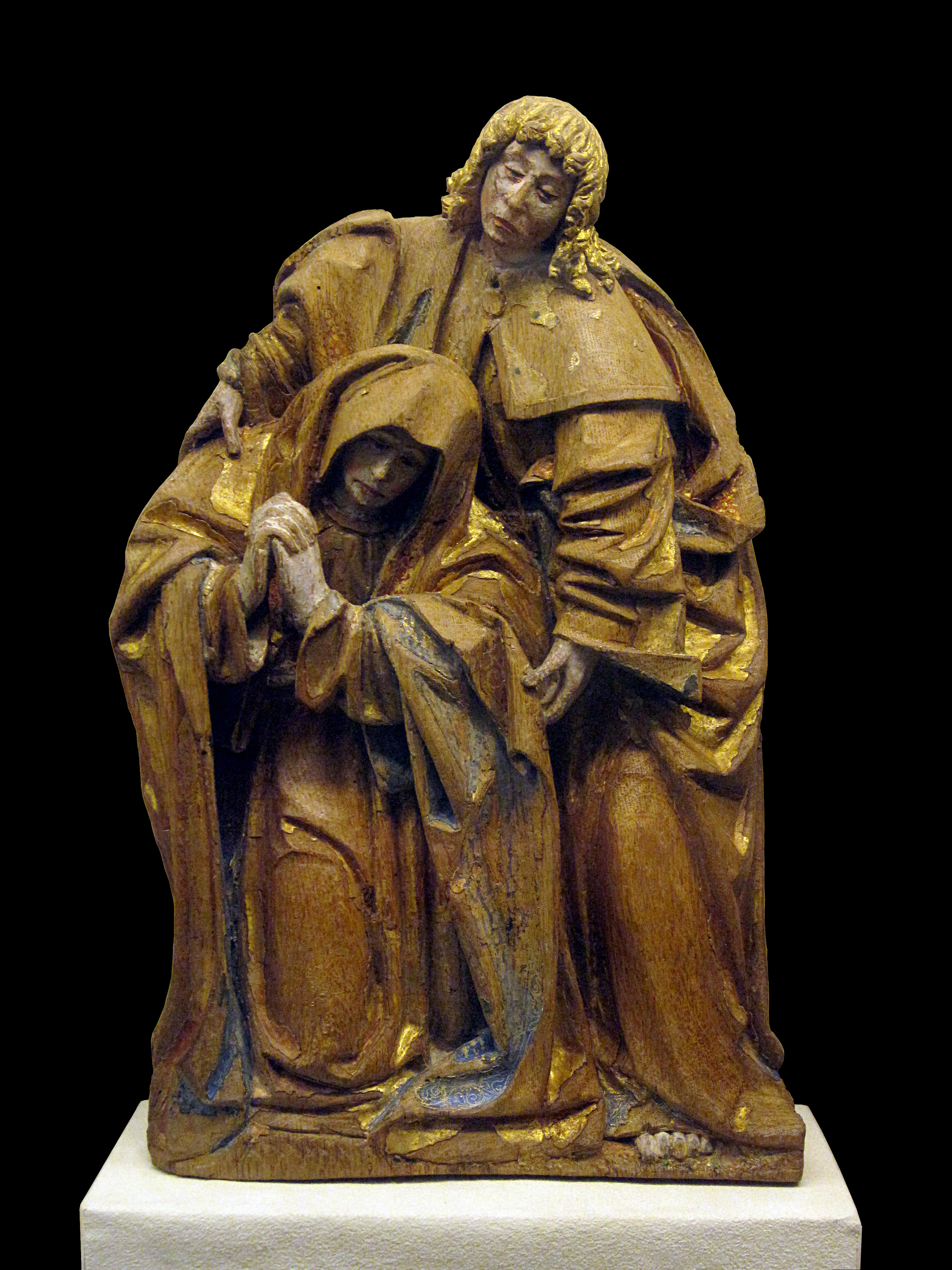
The Swoon of the Virgin, made during the late Middle Ages.

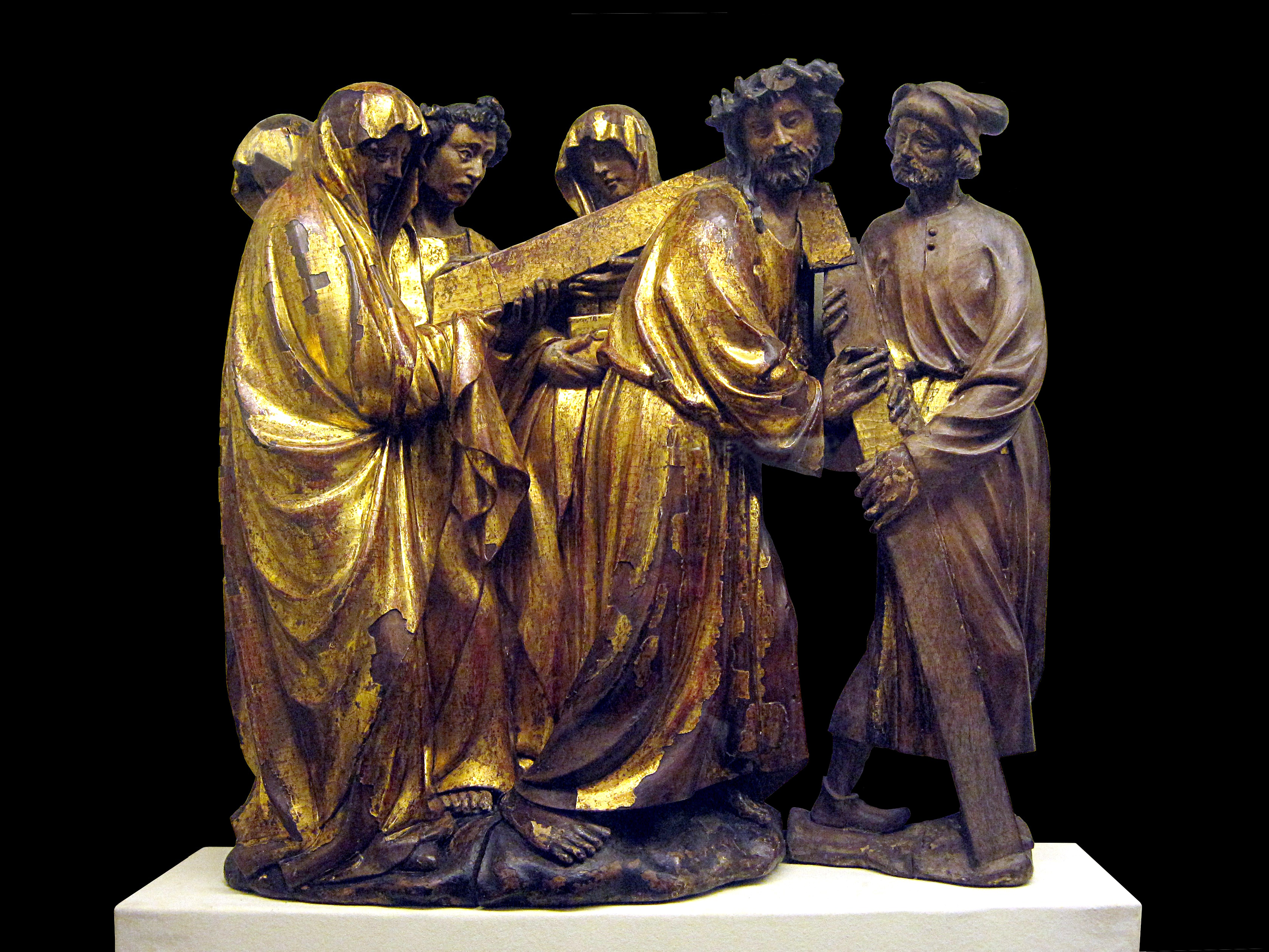
The ascent to Calvary, made around 1400.

== Leadership ==
- Edmond Du Sommerard, Curator (French: Conservateur) 1843–1885
- Alfred Darcel, Director 1885–1893
- Edmond Saglio, Director 1893–1903
- Edmond Haraucourt, Director 1903–1925
- Jean-Joseph Marquet de Vasselot, Director 1926–1933

[For a half century the Musée de Cluny was integrated into the Louvre's department of objets d'art]

- Francis Salet, Chief Curator then Director 1967–1979
- Alain Erlande-Brandenburg, Director 1980–1986
- Fabienne Joubert, Director 1987–1991
- Alain Erlande-Brandenburg, Director 1991–1994
- Viviane Huchard, Director 1994-2005
- Élisabeth Taburet-Delahaye, Director 2005-2019
- Séverine Lepape, Director 2019-present

== In popular culture ==
Herman Melville visited Paris in 1849, and the Hôtel de Cluny evidently fired his imagination. The structure figures prominently in Chapter 41 of Moby-Dick, when Ishmael, probing Ahab's "darker, deeper" motives, invokes the building as a symbol of man's noble but buried psyche.

== See also ==
- List of museums in Paris
