= Votive crown of Recceswinth =

Crown belonging to Visigothic King Recceswinth

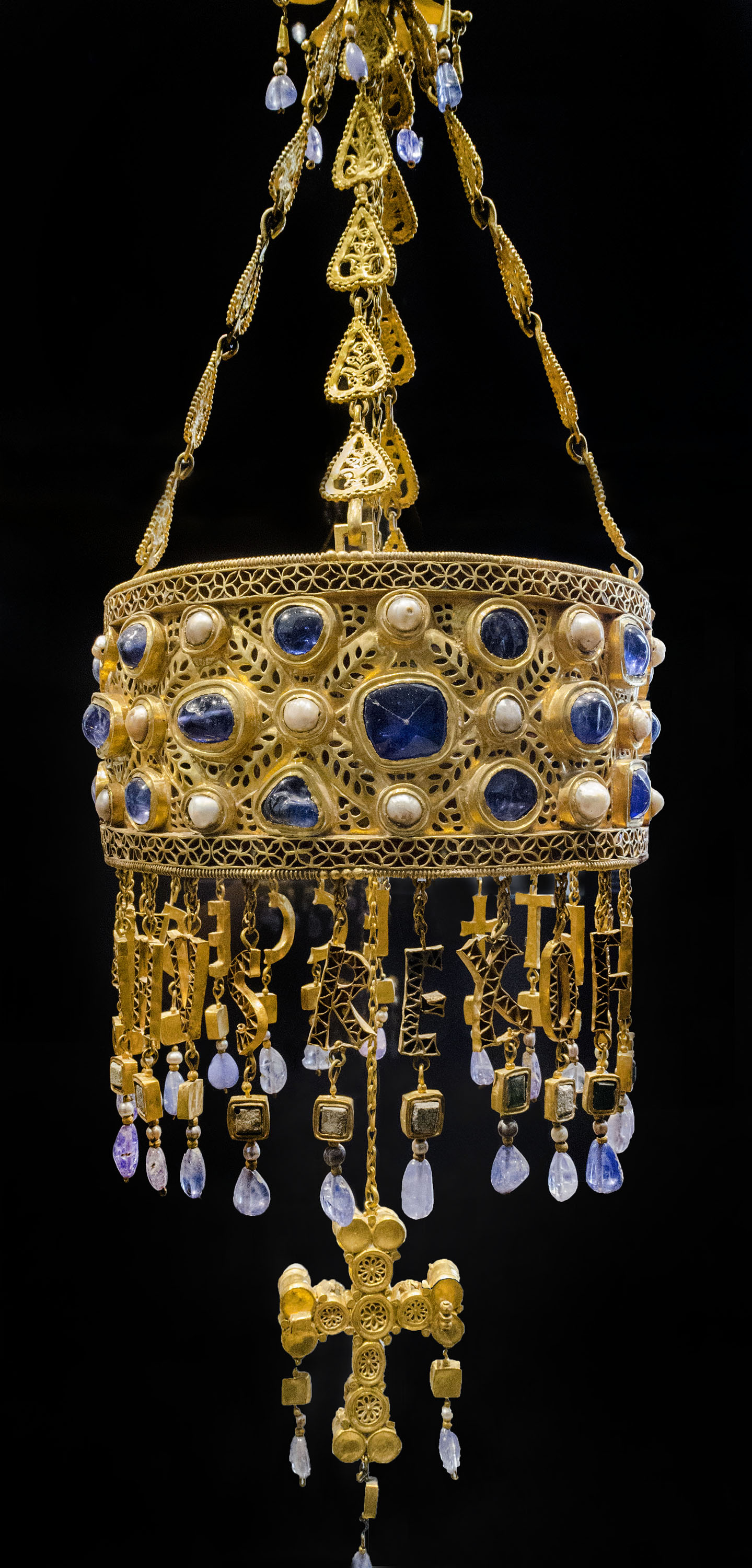
The votive crown as displayed in 2016

The votive crown of Recceswinth plays a vital role in the debate regarding Roman continuity or decline in Western Europe during the Middle Ages. Additionally, the crown serves as a representation of the Visigoths' unique mix of Latin and Germanic cultural influences and is one of the best-preserved artifacts from the Visigoths that exists today. This crown also belonged to one of the most significant Visigothic kings, who is viewed as being a benevolent ruler who was popular among his subjects. The crown reveals aspects of the Visigoth-Byzantine relationship, through its physical design features, through the area it was crafted, and through the area from which the resources used to make the crown were sourced.

== Germanic influences ==
Written descriptive records of the Recceswinth's votive crown were created by French historian Ferdinand de Lasteyrie. He was an eyewitness to the crown and provided sketches and writing in his documentation of the treasure. He dedicated most of his writing to describing the features of the crown that resemble Germanic art. There is debate among historians about whether de Lasteyrie's depiction and description of the crown are accurate, with some arguing that he may have fabricated or exaggerated details to make the crown seem to have more of a Germanic artistic influence than it did.

Profesor e investigador de Historia del Arte at Pontificia Universidad Católica de Valparaíso José Alberto Morais Moran supports the claim that de Lasteyrie tried to associate the crown with northern design, attributing de Lasteryie in the politicization of the crown and claiming that his writing sacrificed academic integrity for the sake of nationalism. Another scholar who has questioned the integrity of de Lasteyrie’s study is Art History Professor at Savannah College of Art and Design Joy Partridge, who describes de Lasteryie as "describing the objects’ Germanic style, linking them to the ‘northern peoples’ who spread across Europe."

== Byzantine influences ==
Spanish archeologist Jose Amador de los Rios created a written eyewitness record of the crown. In addition to creating documentation of the crown, Rios drew diagrams and illustrations of the burial site where the crown was found. In his description, Rios focused mostly on the Christian and Roman-influenced aspects of the crown and burial site, which has led scholars to question the integrity of his work as well. One example of a scholar questioning Rios’ work is Joy Partridge, who claims “The Spanish archaeologist José Amador de los Ríos distanced the treasure from Gothic art, instead aligning it with Byzantine and Roman techniques."

The most recent academic writing on the crown was written in 2022 by Joy Partridge. Partridge evaluated the historical significance of the crown relating to Spanish national identity, the Catholic Church, and Visigothic relations with other non-Roman tribes. Partridge first established the lack of visual/art history of the Visigoths, and that the Recceswinth crown is one of the few examples of art that can be better used to understand Visigothic culture and politics. She has also claimed that the crown represents the emergence of the relationship between the Spanish state and the Catholic church and the beginning of the existence of a Spanish identity.

Partridge also introduced the idea that the crown was heavily influenced by Byzantine art as an act of imitation by the Visigoths. Rose Walker, an art historian and professor at The Courtland Institute of Art who has also contributed to recent scholarship regarding the crown claimed that the majority of the Recceswinth crown was manufactured in the Byzantine Empire and then later shipped to Spain. She claims that because of this, Recceswinth modified the crown to have the letters “RECCESVINTHVS REX OFFERET” to establish a sense of ownership and originality. Partridge expands on Walker’s claims by demonstrating the inscription's importance throughout history. The crown has passed through several hands throughout history, with different ethnicities attempting to use it as a point of identity.

== Burial site ==
A description of the burial site where the crown was found was written by Jose Amador de los Rios. He described the burial site as a 32x32 "underground cemetery", with multiple skeletons being discovered at the sight. The graves in the site were constructed with "masonry and brick", and measured at about one foot thick. These coffins were covered with thick concrete slabs. Along with the graves, the burial site consisted of two "boxes made of Roman concrete" which encapsulated the votive crown and other treasures. The significance of the burial site's design lies in its mix of both Pagan and Christian burial rituals. While there were many Christian influences present in Visigothic society at this time and Recceswinth himself was heavily influenced by the teachings of Christianity, the design characteristics and manner of his burial can still be categorized as predominantly Pagan influenced.

The crown was buried alongside other treasures from a church in the capital of Visigothic Spain, and it has been argued that the crown was buried to protect it from the Caliphate that would later occupy Spain. The crown, along with everything else buried alongside it, was discovered in the mid-19th century just outside of Toledo, Spain. When it was discovered in the 19th century, many parts of the discovery were sold off or melted down, and the crown is one of the few remaining items. Along with Recceswinth's crown, the crown of King Suinthila survived. This crown is claimed to clearly reflect similar inspiration to Recceswinth's, and also show that the crowns were crafted as "an act of homage to God and as a ‘crown of victory,’ such as those worn by martyrs or the Elders of the Apocalypse."

== Design characteristics of the crown ==
Former director of the Cleveland Museum of Art William Milliken has attempted to explain some of the influences, design techniques, and artistic trends implemented in Visigothic Spain. He explained why gold was such a valuable source for evaluating art from the past, crediting its durability, retention of value, and workability for many historical gold pieces still existing today. Milliken also has claimed that the tradition of burying jewelry with the dead was not an inherently Christian ritual, showing that the community that buried Recceswinth was heavily influenced by non-Christian beliefs. Milliken also proposed that Byzantine goldsmith work from this period was often secular, with the crosses found on certain votive crowns and pendants not necessarily being a symbol of Christianity, but simply a typical Byzantine design feature. Milliken attributes common design features found in Byzantine goldsmith work as being a reflection of the period that they were made in, not the culture that created them, saying "The votive crown has other typical sixth-century characteristics… a technique, here employed, was handed down from Etruscan, Greek, and Roman jewelry and which was also widely diffused in barbaric art".

Historian Rose Walker has established an argument claiming that eighth and ninth-century art from the Iberian Peninsula has been studied from the wrong perspective. She argued that historians have generally projected the idea that Iberian art from this time was completely independent of external influence because of the nature of the ongoing Reconquista. Walker argued that this is a false historical narrative, saying “that the rhythms of its (Iberian art’s) production responded to those in the outside world, both north and south". Walker referenced the legend of Pelayo to demonstrate the narrative that Christians presented when they were in conflict with Muslims. She also claimed that there are no non-Christian sources that demonstrate this legend and that there are no archaeological sources to prove its existence. Because of that, this legend is probably a result of Christians mistelling history to make themselves seem more successful and influential. This is important because if Christian rewriting of Iberian history was commonplace at the time, it is possible that historical writing regarding the Recceswinth Crown was corrupted by a Christian bias.

In 2019, Professors Deborah Deliyannis, Hendrik Dey, and Paolo Squatriti collaborated on the book "Fifty Early Medieval Things". In this book, there is an entry dedicated to Recceswinth's crown, which first established that Recceswinth's crown was a "votive" crown. This means that the crown was "Purely decorative… designed to be hung from chains over the altar of a church (not worn on the head like a crown),". A descriptive physical evaluation of the crown followed, which listed the material used and the exact dimensions of the crown. The entry then described the methodology for dating the crown, establishing that they used the approximate dates of the reign of Reccesenwinth and his father to help determine the age of the crown.

The entry made the same argument as Partridge's article; that the materials used to craft the crown were sourced globally. More specifically, the entry claimed that the gold used in the crown was mined in southern Spain and that the gems used came from Sri Lanka. Finally, the entry argued that the crown can be used as "a testament to the wealth of the Visigothic kingdom in his day." The entry supported the argument of the crown having substantial value by demonstrating the purity of the crown, which sits at over 90 percent.

== Visigothic society and code ==
Historian Floyd Seyward Lear has claimed that Visigothic law is the clearest demonstration available of a blending of barbarian and Roman influences, saying "There is little doubt that the Visigothic codes illustrate the transition from a Roman to a Germanic legal basis and the fusion of Roman and Germanic law with greater precision and detail than any other examples," Lear claimed that Visgothic law was similar to other laws in Roman-influenced Germanic communities, such as the Lombards and Bavarians. He said that the main Visigothic code was established in the 7th century and heavily based on its preceding laws, with the Visigothic code receiving its most "essential features" during the reign of Recceswinth. This may provide insight into another reason that this particular crown was preserved because Recceswinth was a representation of the implementation of the most essential parts of Visigothic law (and therefore culture).

Lear demonstrated that the creation of Visigothic law came from the obsolescence of the former system(s) of law, with Germanic people and Roman people following different codes while coinhabiting an area. He also shined a light on the areas of the Visigothic code that were directly influenced by Christianity, citing the laws as having "Christian influence in the injunction to govern by love rather than by force." He credited Recesswinth as having declared that man and king should be subject to the same laws and instilling the idea that the king is the head which transmits power to the limbs of the kingdom. The populist nature of these declarations is a possible contribution to Recesswinth and his artifacts’ preservation, with his subjects wanting to preserve who they thought was a benevolent intellectual. Additionally, residents of Toledo could have seen Recesswinth as an embodiment of their city itself, giving more reason to try and preserve him and his belongings.

To demonstrate Germanic influences in Visigothic law, Lear referenced the lack of a crime for "treason", with the code instead having a law regarding "conspiracy". He argued that this shows Germanic influence because a truly Roman code would have a law addressing treason and consider it one of the most serious crimes possible, an intensity of which the Visigothic code did not apply to their law. He also used the fact that the Visigoths didn't deem refusing military service as treasonable, contrary to the Roman code, to support his argument that Visigothic laws had a strong Germanic influence. To summarize what can be taken away from Lear's arguments: to the people of Toledo, the Recceswinth crown was not only a meticulously crafted work of art, but a representation of their unique amalgamation of cultures, and a representation of a King who was an essential factor in creating a unique legal system that granted more rights to the people than was commonplace at the time.
