= Isabel Enríquez =

Isabel Enríquez may refer to:

- Isabel Enríquez (nun) (died 1420/1), Castilian royalty
- Isabel Enríquez de Almansa y Manrique (died 1586), Castilian noblewoman
- Isabella Henríquez (17th century), Sephardic poet
- Isabel Enríquez (politician), Ecuadorian academic
- Isabel Jimena Enríquez Mayta (born 1997), Peruvian singer
