= Pendilia =

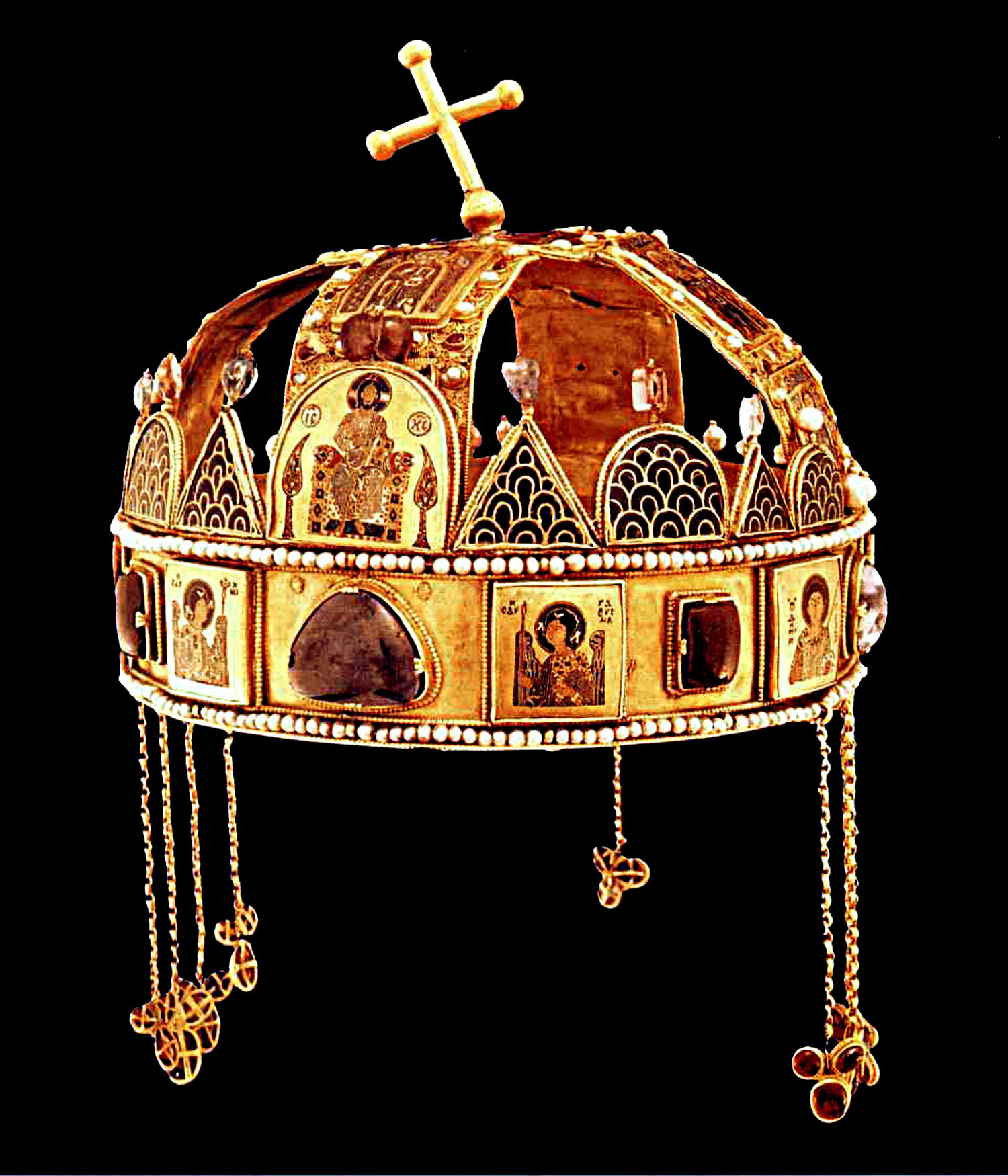
The Holy Crown of Hungary having pendilia.

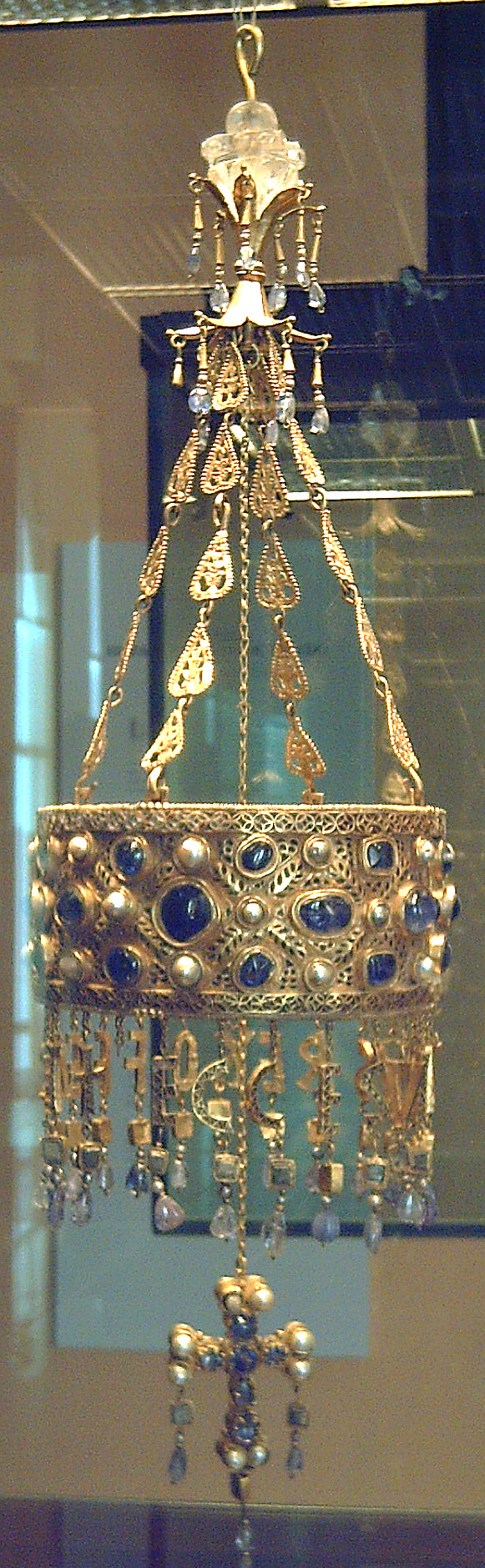
Votive crown of the Visigoth King Recceswinth († 672), part of the Treasure of Guarrazar.

Pendilia (singular pendilium; from Latin pendulus, hanging) or pendoulia (the Greek equivalent), are pendants or dangling ornaments hanging from a piece of metalwork such as a crown, votive crown, crux gemmata, or kamelaukion, and are a feature of Early Medieval goldsmith work. On crosses the pendilia may include the letters alpha and omega, and on votive offerings, which were often designed to be hung over altars and where pendilia are at their largest and most spectacular, they may spell out whole words (see illustration).

The term is commonly used in coin collecting. Pendilia are depicted on coins as jewels or pearls hanging from the sides of the crown, and occur frequently on coins of Byzantine emperors. The pendilia which hung from the Emperors' crowns began with Marcian. Although the years saw the styles of crown change, the pendilia remained, at least through Manuel II Palaiologos. Surviving crowns with pendilia include the Holy Crown of Hungary and many votive crowns of the Treasure of Guarrazar from Visigothic Spain.

The historical origin of the pendilia is not known. It has been suggested that they could have evolved from helmet fastenings, features of earlier Hellenistic diadems, or veils. The fact that they attract glances could point to apotropaic origins.
