= Recceswinth =

King of the Visigoths from 649 to 672

- King of the Visigoths
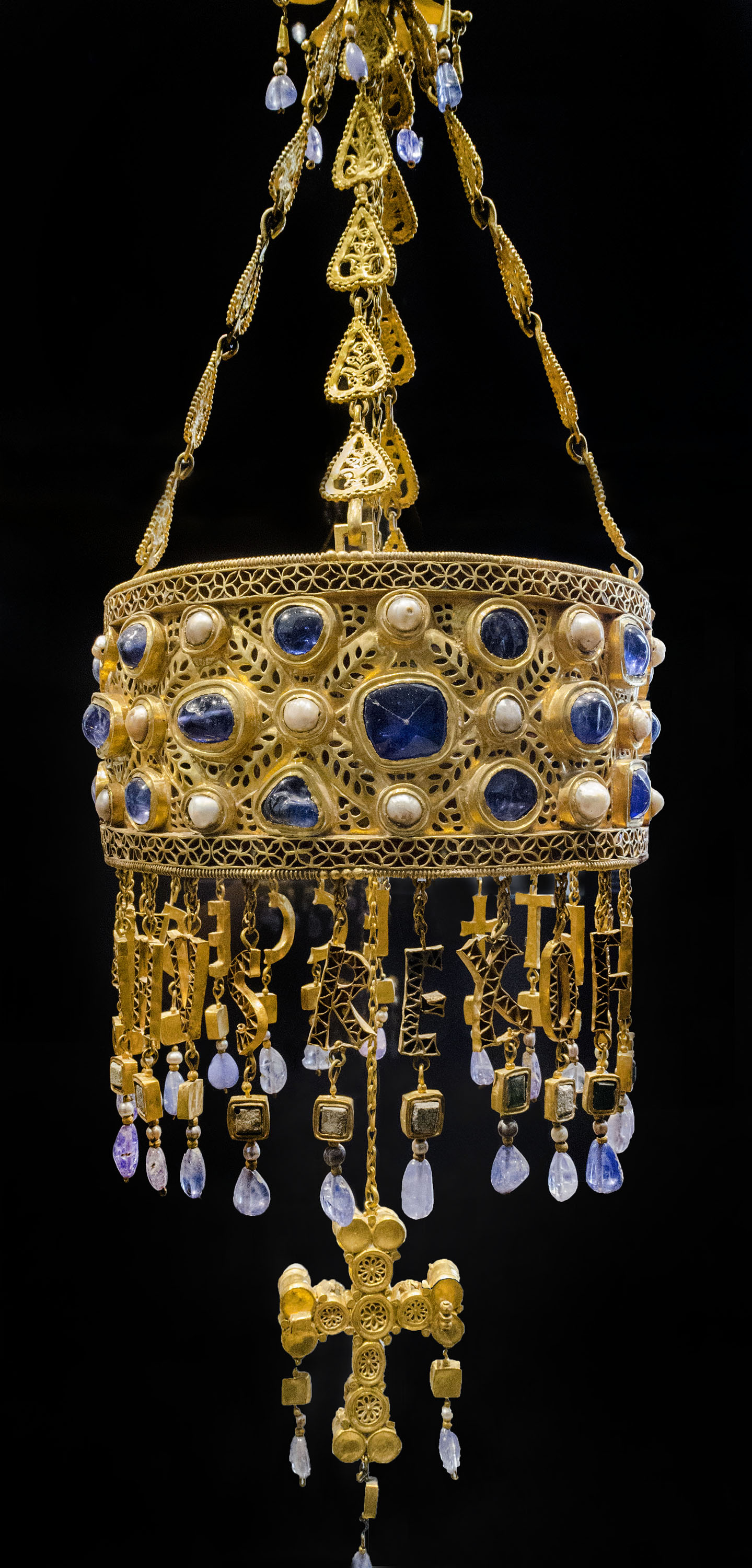
- Votive crown of Recceswinth, as found in the treasure of Guarrazar, Spain.
- Reign: 20 January 649 – 1 September 672
- Coronation: 20 January 649
- Predecessor: Chindasuinth
- Successor: Wamba
- Co-king: Chindasuinth (20 January 649 – 30 September 653)
- Died: 1 September 672

Recceswinth (died 1 September 672) was the Visigothic King of Hispania and Septimania in 649–672. He ruled jointly with his father Chindaswinth until his father's death in 653.

== Name ==
His Gothic name is believed to have been *𐍂𐌰𐌹𐌺𐌰𐍃𐍅𐌹𐌽𐌸𐍃 (*Raikaswinþs), from the roots reiks ("king") and swinþs ("strong"). His votive crown used the Latin spelling RECCESVINTHVS. Other Latin spellings include Recceswinthus, Recesvindus. In English his name is also spelled Reccesuinth, Recceswint, Reccaswinth; Spanish Recesvinto; Portuguese Recesvindo; German Rekkeswint; French Réceswinthe.

== Reign ==
Under Recceswinth, the Visigothic Kingdom enjoyed an unbroken peace for 19 years (653–672) — except for a brief rebellion of the Vascons, led by a noble named "Froya," an exiled Goth, who fleeing the monarch’s persecutions had settled, like many others, in Basque territory. Froya and the Vascons ravaged the lands of the Ebro Valley, looted churches, murdered clerics, and laid siege to the city of Zaragoza. Recceswinth reacted, broke the siege, and killed Froya".

Beginning in 654 Recceswinth was responsible for the promulgation of a law code, Liber Iudiciorum, to replace the Breviary of Alaric; he placed a Visigothic common law over both Goths and Hispano-Romans in the kingdom. This Liber Iudiciorum showed little Germanic influence, adhering more closely to the old Roman laws. In his general law code of 654, he outlawed a set of essential Jewish practices, including male circumcision, dietary laws (kashrut), marriage laws and ceremonies, and the celebration of Passover.

Moreover, the church councils in the Visigothic capital Toledo (Toletum) became the most powerful force in the government and the bishops were the primary support of the monarchy. Will Durant wrote in The Age of Faith: "By their superior education and organization they dominated the nobles who sat with them in the ruling councils of Toledo; and though the king's authority was theoretically absolute, and he chose the bishops, these councils elected him, and exacted pledges of policy in advance."

Recceswinth died on 1 September 672, just before the first Arab raid on Hispania Baetica.

== Votive crown of Recceswinth ==
The votive crown of Recceswinth is an example of Visigothic art made in Hispania. It was found in the Treasure of Guarrazar, a goldsmith's treasure made up of crowns and crosses that several kings of Toledo offered in their time as a gesture of the orthodoxy of their faith and their submission to the ecclesiastical hierarchy; the treasure was found between 1858 and 1861 at the archaeological site called Huerta de Guarrazar, located in the city of Guadamur, near Toledo.

The votive crown of Recceswinth is in Madrid's National Archaeological Museum of Spain. Among the crowns, made of gold and precious stones, it is well known for the refined workmanship of its goldsmithery, with gemstones suspended beneath the filigree Latin letters hanging from its base, which read: RECCESVINTHVS REX OFFERET ("King Receswinth offered it").

== See also ==
- Visigothic Kingdom
- Church of San Juan Bautista, Baños de Cerrato

Regnal titles
Preceded by Chindasuinth	King of the Visigoths; 20 January 649 – 1 September 672 with Chindasuinth (20 January 649 – 30 September 653)	Succeeded by Wamba
