= Isabel Enríquez (nun) =

Isabel Enríquez (died 1420/1) was a member of the Castilian royal family and a Poor Clare. She was an illegitimate daughter of King Henry II of Castile and an unknown woman.

She married Gonzalo Núñez de Guzmán in secret. For this, Gonzalo was excommunicated and imprisoned. It has been suggested that Gonzalo may have kidnapped Isabel, on the grounds that a merely secret marriage would not have incurred either prison or excommunication. In any case, Gonzalo later entered the Order of Alcántara, rising to become master in 1384. His excommunication was only lifted by Archbishop Pedro Tenorio on 23 September 1395.

Isabel and Gonzalo are usually assumed to have had no children, although Luis González de Guzmán may have been their son.

By 1387, Isabel had entered the convent of Santa Clara la Real de Toledo. In 1393, her sister Inés Enríquez was elected abbess and Isabel acted as de facto co-abbess with her. Their presence attracted royal largesse. Both Henry III and, after the sisters' deaths, John II, made donations to Santa Clara because of their "aunts, abbesses" (tías abadesas). A contemporary painting of the sisters can be seen on the wall of the choir.

She died at Santa Clara in 1420 or 1421.

== Bibliography ==
- Casado Quintanilla, Blas (2012). "Gonzalo Núñez de Guzmán, maestre de Alcántara y de Calatrava, al servicio de la corona de Castilla y León". Espacio, tiempo y forma. Serie III, Historia medieval (25). Universidad Nacional de Educación a Distancia, UNED: Facultad de Geografía e Historia: 147–172. ISSN 0214-9745.
- Pérez de Tudela y Bueso, María Luisa (2002). El Monasterio de Santa Clara La Real de Toledo: estudio sobre una encomienda regia monástica (1376-1779) (PDF) (Doctoral thesis). Universidad Complutense de Madrid: Facultad de Geografía e Historia y Departamento de Historia Medieval. ISBN 978-84-8466-111-5.
- Rodríguez-Picavea Matilla, Enrique (2005). "Prosopografía de la Orden de Calatrava en Castilla: la primera mitad del siglo XV" (PDF). Meridies: Revista de historia medieval (7). Córdoba: Universidad de Córdoba: Facultad de Filosofía y Letras: 201–245. ISSN 1137-6015.
- Salazar y Acha, Jaime de (2021). Las dinastías reales de España en la Edad Media (PDF). Real Academia de la Historia.
