= Guadamur =

Coordinates: 39°49′N 4°09′W

Guadamur, Spain
- Flag Coat of arms
- Interactive map of Guadamur, Spain
- Country: Spain
- Autonomous community: Castile-La Mancha
- Province: Toledo
- Municipality: Guadamur

Area
  - Total: 37 km^{2} (14 sq mi)
- Elevation: 640 m (2,100 ft)

Population (2025-01-01)
  - Total: 1,796
  - Density: 49/km^{2} (130/sq mi)
- Time zone: UTC+1 (CET)
  - Summer (DST): UTC+2 (CEST)

Guadamur is a municipality located in the province of Toledo, Castile-La Mancha, Spain. According to the 2008 census (INE), the municipality has a population of 1819 inhabitants.

On 4 June 2007 a twinning agreement was signed with the towns of Vouillé (department of Deux-Sèvres, Poitou-Charentes, France) and Tournai (Wallonia region, Belgium), to promote cultural exchanges and develop a cultural tour of Europe, on the occasion of the fifteenth centenary of the Battle of Vouillé. In that town near Poitiers, Clovis I, king of the Franks, defeated the Visigoths of Alaric II in 507. Tournai was the first capital of the Franks under kings Clovis and Childericus.

== The name ==
The name "Guadamur" (Arabic: قدمر) is believed by some scholars to come from an Arabic term meaning 'the river of the waves'. Others suggest that the word derives from wadi al-mur 'river of the wall', referring to a Roman Visigothic hydraulic engineering construction here: the resulting name under this hypothesis is a hybrid of Arabic word wadi, "river valley" and the Latin word murus, "wall". Wadi, (Arabic: الوادي), is a word of Arabic origin used to describe river valleys for much of the year dried up, but subject to dangerously sudden water surges.)

== History ==
=== Origins ===
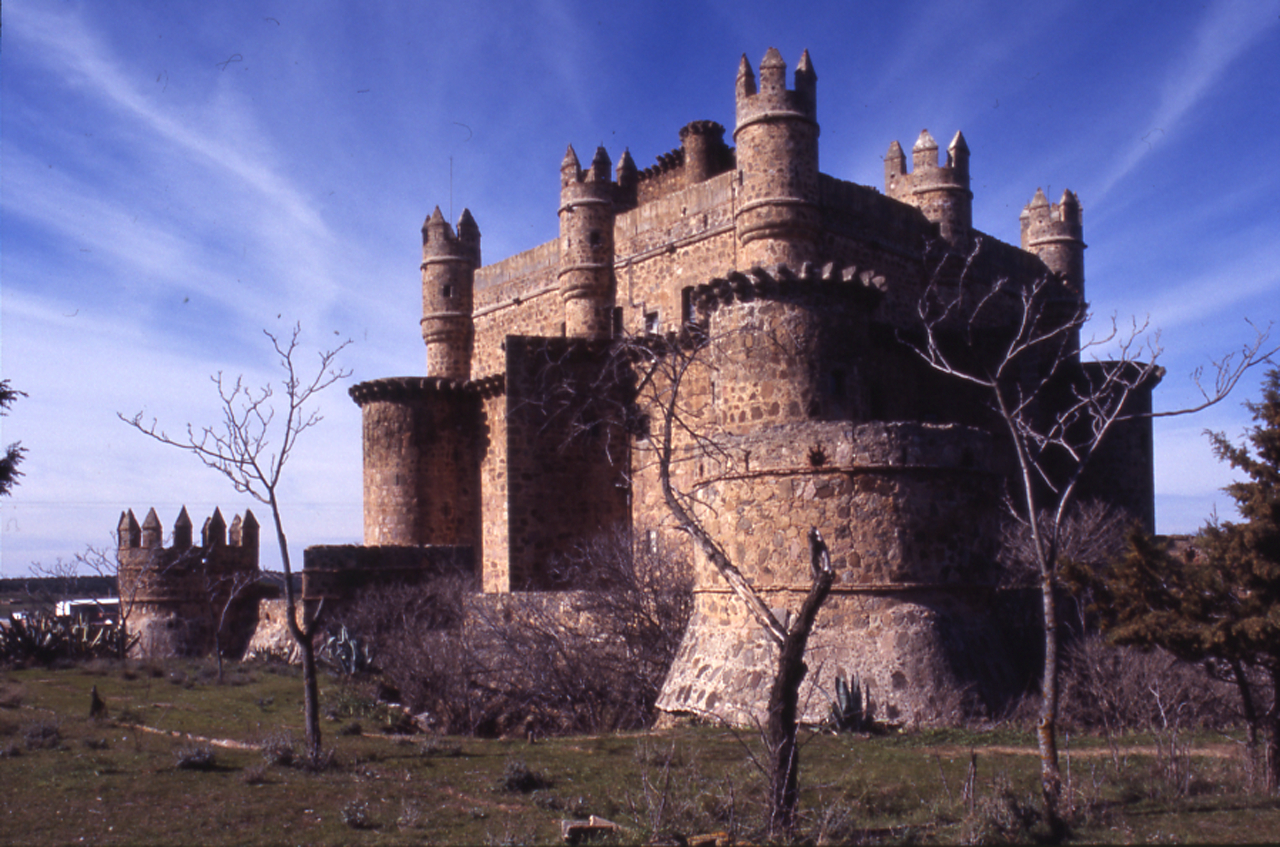
Castle of Guadamur (photo by Paolo Monti).

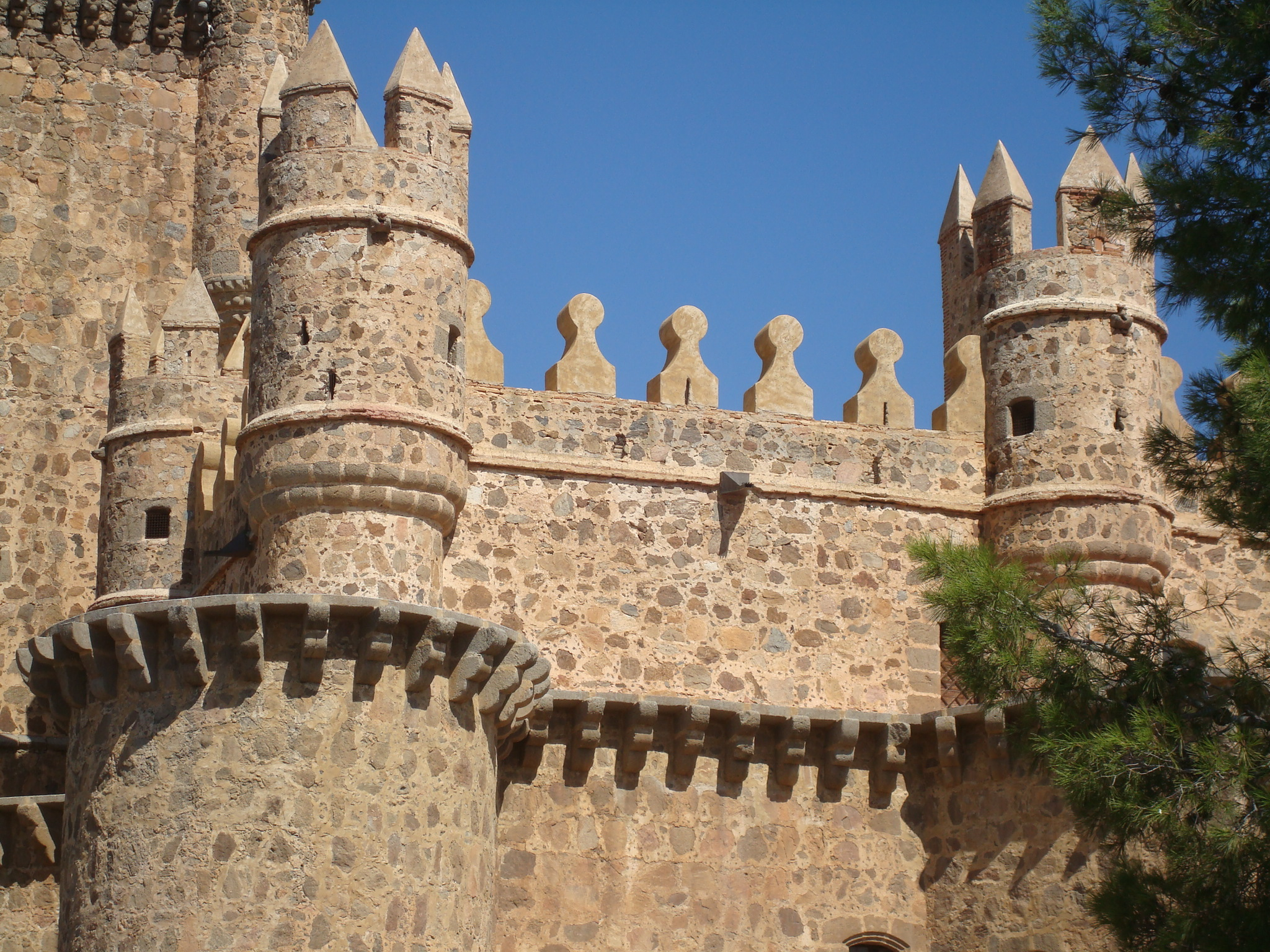
Detail of the towers of the castle

Archaeological remains before our era are rare, but there are a few lithic finds (a Neolithic scraper, a hatchet) difficult to date. Guadamur is too far from Paleolithic settlements nearby (in the province of Madrid).

The residents of the area before the arrival of the Roman receive the designation of Carpetani by geographer Strabo. Near Guadamur are Celtic place names as Alpuébrega, La Brega or Castrejón.

Archaeological findings, although limited, demonstrate the Roman presence in the town and its surroundings: coins, a cameo, a stele of limestone and a brake horse dated in the 2nd century. It is necessary to add pieces reused by the Visigoths, and remains of columns, plates and statues of Carrara marble. There wasn’t a Roman settlement in Guadamur in particular, but it seems secure the existence of a Roman road of the second order and the likely existence of a villa in the area of the old road to Toledo. The local name Portusa, a ford of the Tagus to 8 km northwest of Guadamur, points to the area as a place of transit.

=== Middle Ages ===
The Visigothic period (409-711) left Guadamur the most interesting chapter in its history. In August 1858, heavy storms over Guadamur uncovered a series of tombs at the site of the gardens of Guarrazar. Neighbours Francisco Morales and María Pérez discovered the Treasure of Guarrazar by chance; it is the most important of those found in the Peninsula on the Visigoth era. These findings, other of some neighbors and the archaeological excavation of the Ministry of Public Works and the Royal Academy of History (April 1859), they formed a group consisting of: six crowns, five crosses, a pendant and remnants of foil and channels (almost all of gold, now at the National Archaeological Museum of Madrid), a crown and a gold cross and a stone engraved with the Annunciation (now in the Royal Palace of Madrid), three crowns, two crosses, links and gold pendants (now at the Musee de Cluny, Paris), a crown, and other fragments of a tiller with a crystal ball (stolen from the Royal Palace of Madrid in 1921 and still whereabouts unknown). The most valuable of all is the crown of king Recesvinto (which today names the main square of the town): blue sapphire parts come from the former Ceylon, now Sri Lanka. There were also many fragments of sculptures and the remains of a building, perhaps a Roman delubrum (sanctuary or place of purification); in the following centuries it was dedicated to Christian worship as a church or oratory, which housed a number of graves: in the most important was found a skeleton lying on a bed of lime and sand, and preserved the stone slate, whose Latin inscription mentions a priest named Crispín, dating from 693 (51st year of the reign of Égica, year of the 16th Council of Toledo. This plaque is now in the National Archeological Museum in Madrid. According to some hypothesis, Guarrazar was a monastery that served as a hideout for the real treasure of the court, Toledo churches and monasteries to prevent their capture by the Muslims: the monastery of Sancta Maria in Sorbaces, according to the inscription of the Sónnica cross, a piece of the treasure of Guarrazar preserved in Paris.

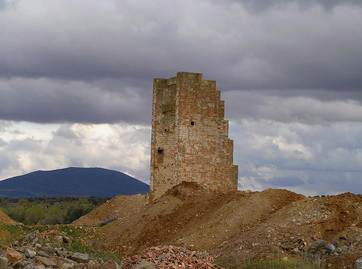
Castillete of Mina de graffito de Guadamur

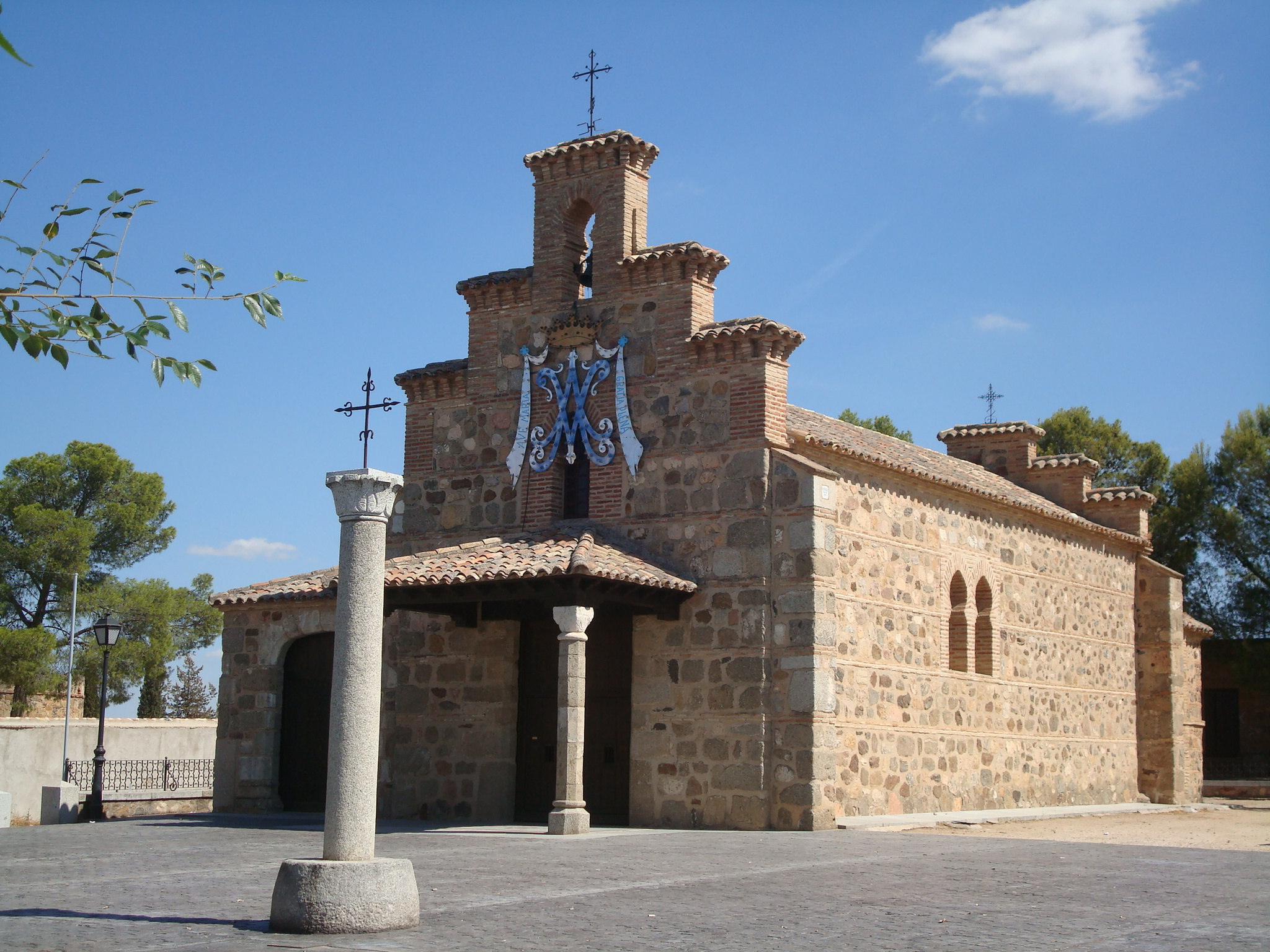
Hermitage of the Virgin of the Nativity

Besides its own name, there are in the vicinity of Guadamur more Moorish remains in the form of name: Daramazán "fortified home"; Daramezas, "home of table or plateau"; Guajaraz", river of thorns "; Guarrazar", valley of lead"; Zuarraz, "little canal"; Aguanel "water of the well"; Aceituno, "the olive grove".

The capitulation of Toledo in 1085 made Almohades and Almoravids attempt to unseat Christians as strategic position. The region, in the next one hundred years, was devastated by attacks and counterattacks by both sides. Initiated recruitment in times of Alfonso VII, Guadamur appears as the village council of Toledo, who pay taxes and which jurisdiction depends. There is documentation which provides proof of the existence of traditional private property of citizens from Toledo around Guadamur and this can be traced to the reign taifa by the Arabic names of the farms. Since the late 12th century these properties were passed into the hands of the clergy, especially the regular.

During the 13th, 14th and 15th centuries, this land was in a progression towards the noble scheme, and it begins to feel the shame of servitude in a monarchical decomposition, strengthened nobility, peasant resistance, religious conflict, plague and livelihood crisis. Guadamur entered medieval history under the hand of Pedro López Ayala, son of the royal chancellor and mayor of Toledo, whose family disputes control to the Silva. He intervened in the war that pitted Juan II and favorite Álvaro with infants of Aragon, Don Enrique and Don Juan, and ended up giving Toledo in 1440. Lost ground, Juan II forgave Pedro in 1444; in 1446 won Guadamur, among other possessions, as a royal granting. This date marks the beginning of four centuries of manorial system in the town: the town became a possession of an absolute landlord that judges, punishes, fines, legislates, chooses the authorities and subjects the villains to taxes and benefits. The son of Don Pedro was the first Count of Fuensalida (1470); two years before he had obtained permission from the king to build a castle in Guadamur, probably on a previous moose Arabic watchtower. It holds the shields of the Ayala and the Silva families, rivals in medieval Toledo. The 15th century also dates the nearby shrine of Our Lady of the Nativity, influenced by the Toledo Mudéjar style.

=== Modern Age ===
In 1471 Guadamur obtained the title of town. In these years is also built a pillory on the square of the village, insignia of jurisdiction and execution, which replaced the old gallows of wood (still a hill not far from the castle retains the name of "Cerro de la Horca").

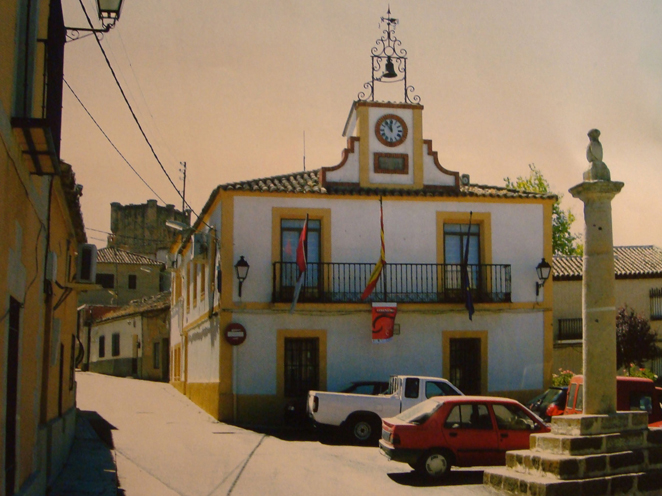
Guadamur's City Hall

The III Count of Fuensalida (1489–1537) hosted Prince Don Felipe and Doña Juana in Guadamur on 11 July 1502, just after they had been appointed heir and heiress to the Crown of the Kingdom of Castile. In 1590, during the reign of Philip II, the castle serves as a secret prison of the Inquisition. The Vi Count participated in the expulsion of the Moors (1609) recruiting 126 young men and weapons in Guadamur. The IX Count was appointed by Charles II Captain General of the Kingdom of Sardinia and Captain General of Milan. In the 17th century Fuensalida County reaches its maximum expansion: 10,000 inhabitants and 40,000 ha, the second state of the kingdom of Toledo. In the Cadastre of Ensenada, which collects data at the villa from 1752, mention is made of "tithes and first fruits of which are caught in it" and go, inter alia, to the parish of Guadamur, to the coffers of the King, to the Cardinal Archbishop of Toledo, to the canons of the Cathedral of Toledo and the parishes of Santo Tomé, Santa Leocadia, San Martín, San Román, San Ginés, San Antolín, San Nicolás, La Magdalena, San Andrés, San Justo, San Vicente, the Mozarabic, Santa Eulalia and Santa Justa. The history of the county ended in 1843 just when the Government granted the noble properties of Guadamur to the neighbours of the town.

In the 16th century there were two local pastures (dehesas): in the Old one grazed herds of Segovian Mesta. In the New one were seventy hives in the 18th century, which produced abundant honey and beeswax. The Toledan archbishop Silíceo (1546) built a bridge over the Guajaraz. Dating from this period is also the parish church of St. Mary Magdalene and the hermitage of San Antonio Abad, San Antón popularly (though the saint who was venerated in it until the mid-19th century was San Sebastián). The chapel now houses the Museum of Popular Arts and Customs of the Montes de Toledo.

=== Contemporary Age ===
At the end of 1808 Guadamur receives a detachment of French cavalry which was part of Napoleon's troops entered Toledo on December 13. Are installed in the castle, then abandoned but in good use (as the pastor of the town, Juan José de Funes, wrote in 1788). According to documents from 1811, the village contributes towards supplying the infantry and artillery troops quartered in Mazarambroz with daily rations of bread, meat, wine, pulses, salt, oil, coal, wood, barley straw and bran. The resistance of the population has led some young people to integrate into the line of guerrilla of Ambrosio Carmena, "El Pellejero".

In September 1812 the population vowed solemnly the Constitution of Cadiz. The confiscation of church property in the 19th century affected Guadamur to the extent that many neighbours, who had leased land in the municipality owned by the Catholic Church, saw how they were sold at auction. In some cases, the new owner terminated the contract, in others it increased. For example, one of the largest estates, Daramezas, passed from the hands of the nuns of the Monastery of Santo Domingo el Real de Toledo to private hands, and the estate of Aceituno, which belonged since 1221 to the Toledan convent of San Clemente, came to lay hands. In some cases the lands were purchased by tenants of the villa.

In 1834 the Banda Municipal de Música was established, and remains active.

The Constitution of 1837 gave the go-ahead to the creation of the militia, military companies in most of the municipalities comprising the neighbors. The Guadamur militia were mobilized on several occasions at the end of this decade to try to neutralize Carlists that were sheltered in the Montes de Toledo. The farmers suffered continual theft of cattle, and ended up signing a mutual aid agreement for such an eventuality.

The exploitation of the subsoil, which dates back at least 1612, when an exploding mine of lead and other of khol (used in cosmetics), gaining momentum with graphite mine in the last third of the 19th century . These mines have reached 110 workers, drawing up to 400 metric tons annually in 1963 and closed without depleting the grain graphite by German competition.

In 1887 the town sold the castle to the sixth count of Asalto, a distant relative of Ayala, who inherits from his son, the Marquis de Argüeso, Member of Parliament for Tarragona. For his personal interest is obtained the grant of the phone in 1922. The castle will not reach the category of historical-artistic monument to 1964.

In the late 19th century, being mayor Lorenzo Navas, former colonial governor of Tarlac (Philippines), the old well of the council is replaced by a four-pipe now defunct (in Recesvinto Square) and a trough-pillar that gave name to the Plaza del Pilar. The water will not reach the houses of Guadamur until 1928, after the lighting (1907).

=== Second Republic ===
With the advent of the Second Spanish Republic Guadamur called the creation of the first labor union, the General Union of Workers (UGT), whose local Society (Casa del Pueblo) was located on the street of San Antón. Then began the construction of the Public Schools (1935), which today houses the Center of Treasury of Guarrazar. The democratic regime also built Nueva street, populated by day laborers and small farmers and by then the only street-level and straight people; it presented a harmonious arrangement of facades, patios and height that has not survived to this day.

After the coup of 18 July 1936, Guadamur remained under the government of the Second Spanish Republic until the final days of the Spanish Civil War. In November 1936 a battalion of the Regiment of Militia led by Manuel Castro Iglesias in conscript socialists peasants. In December that year the City Council resumed their regular sessions, after a first moment that the Defense Committee relegated it to the secondary. It is politically unitary because the seven councilors belong to the Spanish Federation of Workers of the Earth (FETT-UGT). At this time Guadamur presents an example of integral collectivism: only two farms occupied by then 52.2% of the municipality, and after the military uprising was the seizure of these and others, as well as small shops and homes of considered enemies of the Republic. On 25 August 1936 the community "Pablo Iglesias" was established, the entire municipality being integrated into it, breaking the boundaries of private property and dividing the land into plots. The Committee took the responsibility of supplies, trade and the only tavern. The parish church and chapels of the Nativity and San Antón became barns, warehouses. The castle suffered looting of several rooms, including the library. The Municipal Council, like many other peoples of Republican Spain, issued its own currency.

On 7 May 1937 the Nationalist army broke the front to the south of the city of Toledo and penetrates to the north of the municipality of Guadamur; in such action captured the neighbouring population of Argés, recovered by Republican forces a few days later. Between 12 and 25 May the 11th Division of the Republican People's Army under the command of the communist Enrique Líster, held rallies (with concert and cinema) in the area: in Guadamur was in front of City Hall and the street the Nativity, and took representatives of the town, delegates of workers from factories in Madrid and representatives of the Division. In October 1937 the district was integrated gradually losing its originality, as in many other places, under pressure from its communist partners, who advocated a cooperative basis to small farmers, industry and services arising from the fragmentation. In October 1938, this pressure led to a plot to give the day labourers who wanted to secede from the commune. This initiative, already converted into agricultural cooperative market, was dissolved at the end of that year. On 27 March 1939 Nationalist troops took the town.

=== Francoist Spain ===
The "General Cause" recorded 45 victims due to the revolutionary suppression, number of outstanding research by-case basis, because for sure there will be victims who were entered in their villages. As regards the repression carried out by Francoist Spain, apart from the 26 fatalities recorded natural Guadamur, many residents went to the new state prison and suffered humiliation, exile, banishment and condemnation to death, sometimes switched with the customary charge of "assisting the rebellion."

In Francoist Spain councilmen were chosen by at least two thirds coming out of three groups formed by the heads of households in the municipality (men for the most part, except for widows and women aged over 25 living alone); the members of the unions based in the Borough (just one in fact, the Franco's one) and the group that made up the so-called "prestigious neighbors." Of course, it was always personal applications, because political parties were illegal. In small towns, as Guadamur, the mayor got his position by appointment of the Provincial Governor and Head of the ‘Movimiento’, the single-party.

=== Restoration of democracy ===
On 3 April 1979 democratic elections were held again, after the general election in June 1977. Since then, Guadamur mayors had contested the elections under the acronym of UCD (Unión de Centro Democrático), PSOE (Partido Socialista Obrero Español) and PP (Partido Popular).
