= Gonzalo Núñez de Guzmán =

Gonzalo Núñez de Guzmán (c. 1334 – 1404) was a Castilian nobleman, the master of the Order of Alcántara (1384–1385) and master of the Order of Calatrava (1385–1404).

According to the contemporary historian Fernán Pérez de Guzmán, Gonzalo was 70 years old at his death, which puts his birth around 1334. His parentage is uncertain. According to the chronicler Francisco de Rades, he was a son of Pedro Núñez de Guzmán. His mother was Elvira de Padilla. According to other historians, his father was actually Ramiro Núñez de Guzmán. His parents have also been identified as Ramiro Flórez de Guzmán and María González.

As a young ricohombre, Gonzalo confirmed several privileges of King Henry II. He secretly married the king's illegitimate daughter, Isabel Enríquez. For this he was imprisoned and excommunicated, while Isabel entered a nunnery. They may have had a son, Luis. In 1384, Gonzalo was elected master of the Order of Alcántara. The following year he was elected master of the Order of Calatrava. His excommunication was only lifted in 1395.

As master, he oversaw the aristocratization of Calatrava and introduced his family members into positions of power. He was a member of the regency council during the minority of Henry III. As captain of the frontier in the bishoprics of Córdoba and Jaén, he was preparing a campaign of reconquista when he fell ill and retired to Almagro. He died there late in 1404 and was buried in the order's chapel at Calatrava.

== Bibliography ==
- Ayala Martínez, Carlos de (2022). "Núñez de Guzmán, Gonzalo". Diccionario Biográfico Español. Real Academia de la Historia.
- Casado Quintanilla, Blas (2012). "Gonzalo Núñez de Guzmán, maestre de Alcántara y de Calatrava, al servicio de la corona de Castilla y León". Espacio, tiempo y forma. Serie III, Historia medieval (25). Universidad Nacional de Educación a Distancia, UNED: Facultad de Geografía e Historia: 147–172. ISSN 0214-9745.
- Rodríguez-Picavea Matilla, Enrique (2005). "Prosopografía de la Orden de Calatrava en Castilla: la primera mitad del siglo XV" (PDF). Meridies: Revista de historia medieval (7). Córdoba: Universidad de Córdoba: Facultad de Filosofía y Letras: 201–245. ISSN 1137-6015.
