= Convento de Santa Clara la Real, Toledo =

Convent in Castile-La Mancha, Spain

Coordinates: 39.8600°N 4.0258°W

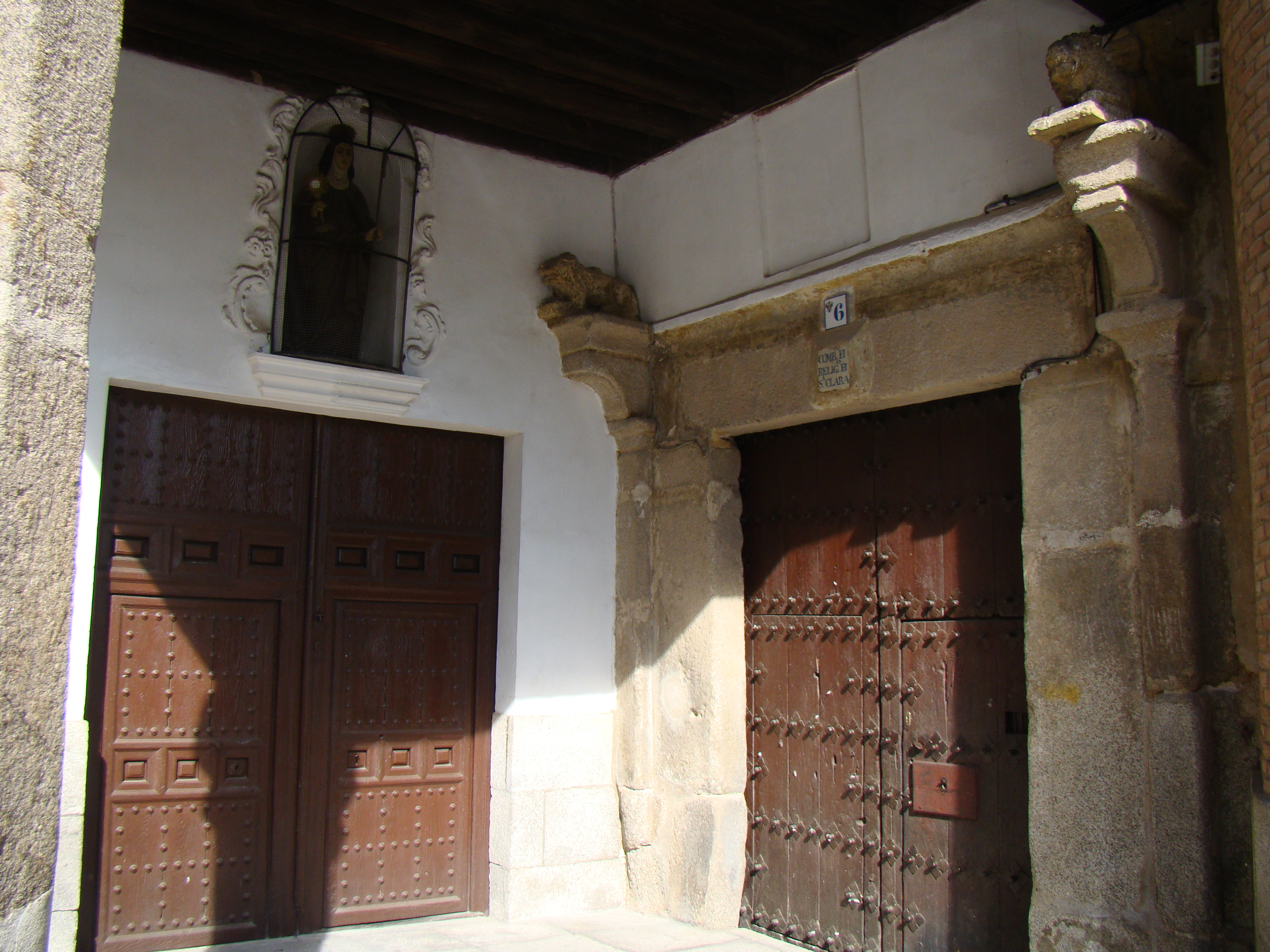
Entrance

The Convento de Santa Clara la Real is a convent of the Poor Clares located in the city of Toledo, Castile-La Mancha, Spain. The present convent was founded in the middle of the 14th century by Toledan noblewoman María Meléndez, and is located near other monasteries of note, such as the monastery of Santo Domingo el Real and the Convent of Capuchins of Toledo.

== History ==
=== Historical background ===
At the beginning of the 13th century, the kingdoms of the Iberian peninsula—Aragon (James), Castile (Alfonso VIII and Ferdinand III), Portugal and Navarre (Sancho el Fuerte)—prepared the so-called "Western Crusade" in which the Franks and Bretons also took part. The Crusade spread across the various Iberian kingdoms, creating in its wake a special form of religious spirituality.

The first missionary journey by Francis of Assisi to the peninsula led to many Franciscan foundations throughout the territory, so much so that in the General Chapter of Assisi (1217) the Franciscan Province of Spain was established. The Friars Minor, in order to carry out their work, came before the civil and ecclesiastical authorities with the "apostolic letters" and their simple poverty. In each city they evangelized, founded a convent of the Order and collaborated to prepare the spirit of religious crusade in aid of the monarchs. Their charismatic way of life inspired in many people a desire for evangelical conversion, even reaching the Crown: Ferdinand III of Castile (1217–1252), was a Protector of the Order, and it seems that he was a member of the Third Franciscan Order (a secular Franciscan order). The King died in 1252, a year before Santa Clara.

Spain was second, after Italy, to receive the Poor Clares, just as before with the Friars Minor, since the Franciscan ideal attracted men and women alike. The origin of the Poor Clares in Spain dates back to the third decade of the 13th century, around 1227 (during the life of Saint Clare), with a strong expansion throughout the century, with the foundation of a total of fifty monasteries in Spain.

=== The primitive convent of Santa María and San Damián of Toledo ===
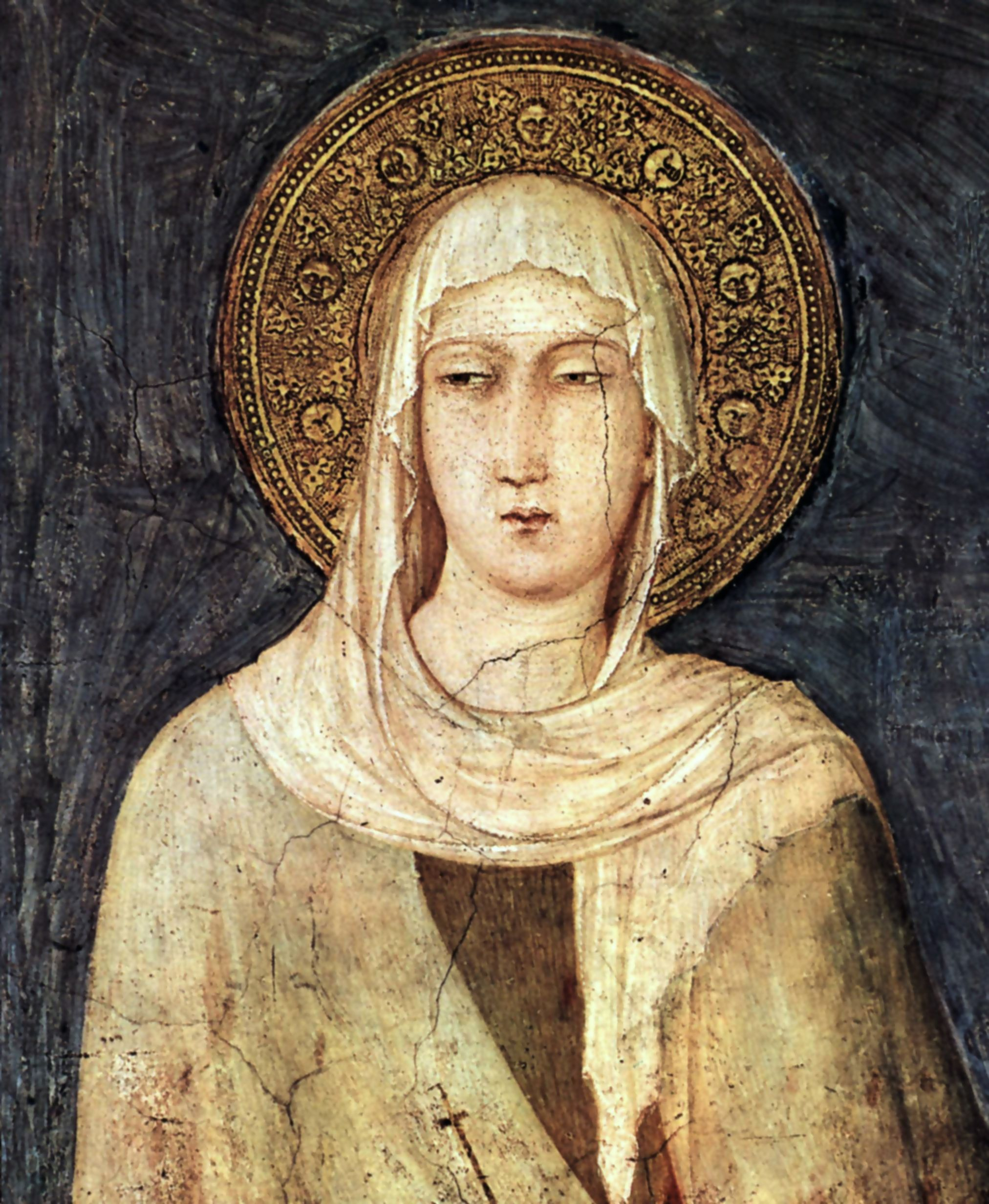
Saint Clare of Assisi. Fresco made by Simone Martini at the beginning of the 14th century. Basilica of Saint Francis of Assisi

The first Clares settled in Toledo within the lifetime of St. Clare of Assisi herself. At the time they were known as Dianians, after the first place where the San Damiano convent of Assisi had been established. They settled on the outskirts of Toledo, in the district or valley of Santa Susana, where the Seismological Institute of Toledo and the Santa Casilda Asylum are located, since the Toledan jurisdiction ordered that no monastery or convent be established within the city, due to the scarcity of urban land and the massive agglomeration of its inhabitants. The Danaanites were ruled in Toledo by the Rule of Saint Benedict and were spiritually directed by the Franciscans of the city, although, as the historian María Luisa Pérez de Tudela pointed out, they lived according to the way of life of Saint Clare. In addition, that primitive convent was placed under the invocation of Saint Mary and Saint Damian. Some authors have stated that it was founded around 1250 with the permission of the archbishop of Toledo, Rodrigo Jiménez de Rada; the historian Pérez de Tudela has pointed out that if this is the case it would have been no later than 1247, the year in which the archbishop died abroad. The historian Pérez de Tudela pointed out that the first document in which the convent is mentioned is in the testament granted in 1248 by the Archbishop Juan de Medina de Pomar, who succeeded Rodrigo Jiménez de Rada at the head of the archdiocese of Toledo, and where, along with some convents located in the interior of the city of Toledo, is referred to another of the minor friars located outside its walls: "et uni quos est extra muris, quod est Ordinis Minorum", which shows, according to the historian, that in 1248 the Poor Clares were already established in the Valley of Santa Susana.

The foundation of the convent was confirmed in 1254 by a bull by Pope Innocent IV.

In 1345, during the last period of the reign of Alfonso XI of Castile, a new ordinance for the city of Toledo was drafted that forbid anyone from living outside its walls, but Pérez de Tudela stated that the Toledo Clares could not comply with this provision because of their extreme poverty and their lack of resources to move inside the walled enclosure, and were forced to continue bearing the inconveniences derived from the fact of residing outside the walled. Nuns remained in that place for more than a hundred years.

=== The Convent of Santa Clara of Toledo ===
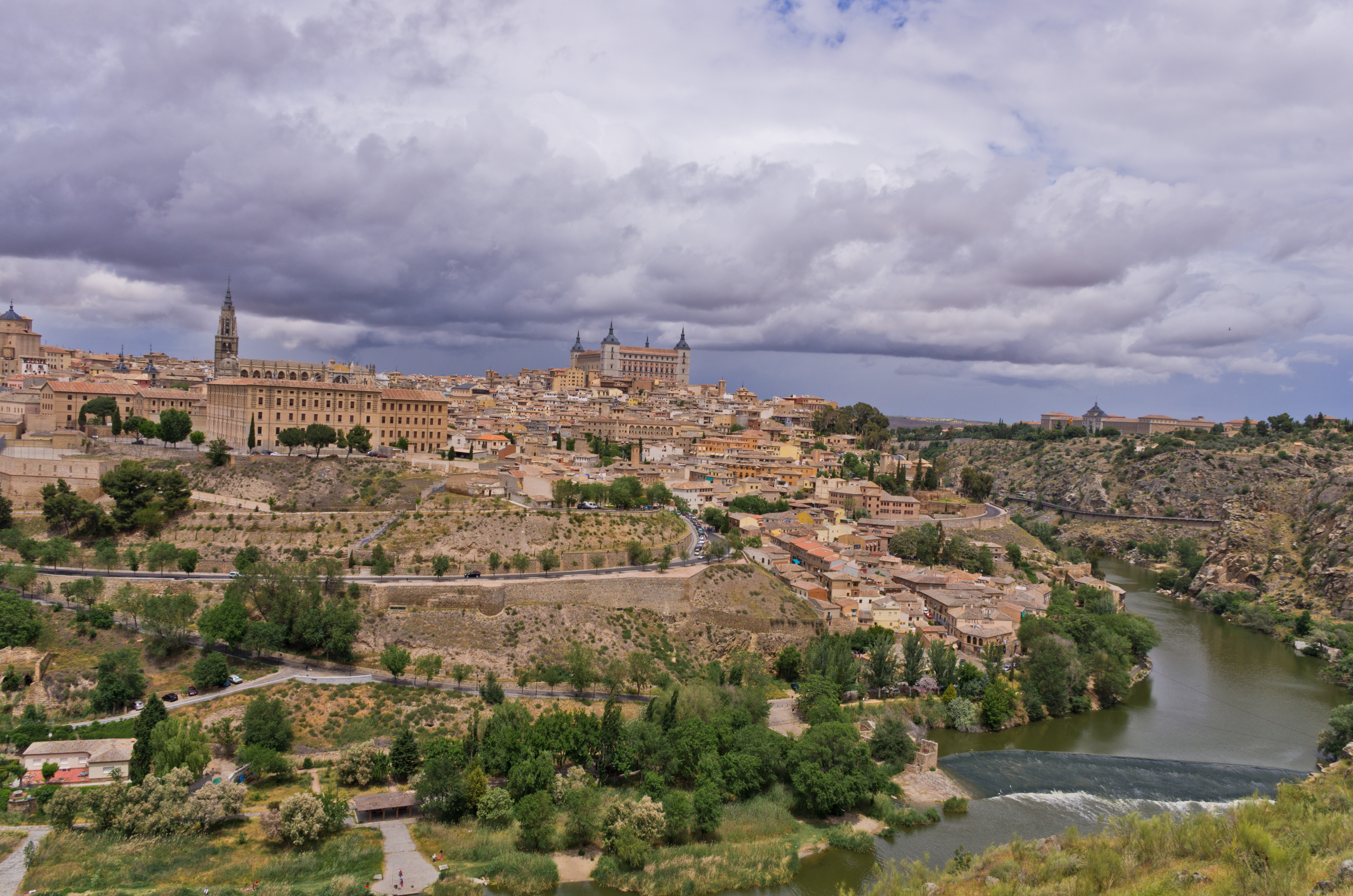
General view of the city of Toledo.

In the middle of the 14th century a lady of the Toledan nobility, María Meléndez, who belonged to a Mozarabic family and was married to Suer Téllez de Meneses, Toledo's chief constable, took the first steps towards the foundation of a convent of Poor Clares in Toledo. Meléndez's husband, Suer Téllez de Meneses, died in 1360. The historian María Luisa Pérez de Tudela said that the first "legal act" of the foundation of the convent of Santa Clara the Real took place on 31 August 1368, during the Castilian Civil War, when Meléndez donated to the Damianite nuns of Toledo and to its abbess Sancha Alfonso the houses of the city of Toledo where the founder lived as the site of a new convent. On 20 January 1370, Meléndez acquired for the convent half of some houses that were next to it and that belonged to a "Habibi mora". In 1370 a document mentions the existence of the convent of Santa Clara de Toledo within the region of the Church of San Vicente; that same year Meléndez became a nun in the convent, as was recorded in several documents issued between 1373 and 1375.

On 27 June 1371, Pope Gregory XI issued in Avignon the Bull Piis devotorum in the name of Gómez Manrique, archbishop of Toledo, authorizing Meléndez to found in the city of Toledo a convent of Clarean nuns and to provide everything necessary so that thirty nuns could live in it. The bull also demanded that the church of the new monastery have a bell tower and bells. The abbess Sancha Alfonso committed herself before the Archbishop of Toledo in her own name and in that of her successors to pay the tribute of the Subsidio and of the parochial tenths.

In 1373 the convent of Santa Clara was canonically established by the deed of the foundation granted by Meléndez on 13 June, by which she ceded to that convent the houses it owned inside the walled city of Toledo and all its possessions so that the Clarisses could build a convent in that city with the capacity to lodge thirty nuns and a sufficient dowry so that the monastery could be maintained with its own rents. On 3 August that year Meléndez granted a new deed in which she expanded the foundational dowry she had given to the convent.
