= Castle of Guadamur =

- Castillo de Guadamur
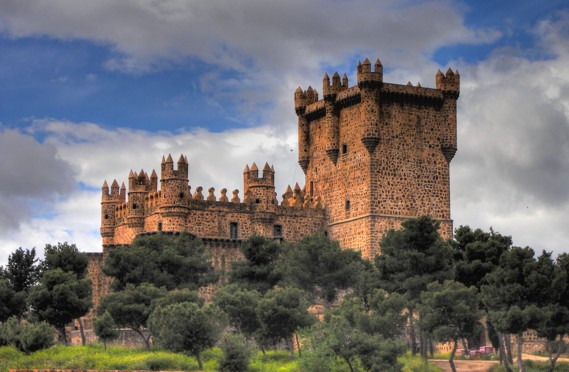
- Interactive map of the Castle of Guadamur area

General information
- Type: Castle
- Location: Guadamur, Spain
- Coordinates: 39°48′38″N 4°08′46″W

The Castle of Guadamur is castle in Guadamur, Spain.

== History and description ==
It was built from scratch in the 15th century by Pedro López de Ayala, although works continued beyond the turn of the century. Erected on a hill to the East of the urban nucleus of Guadamur, it consists of a square main body, with circular towers and a larger ortogonal keep, standing 30 metre high.

It was restored from a previous state of ruin following its acquisition by the Baron of Cuatro Torres in 1887.

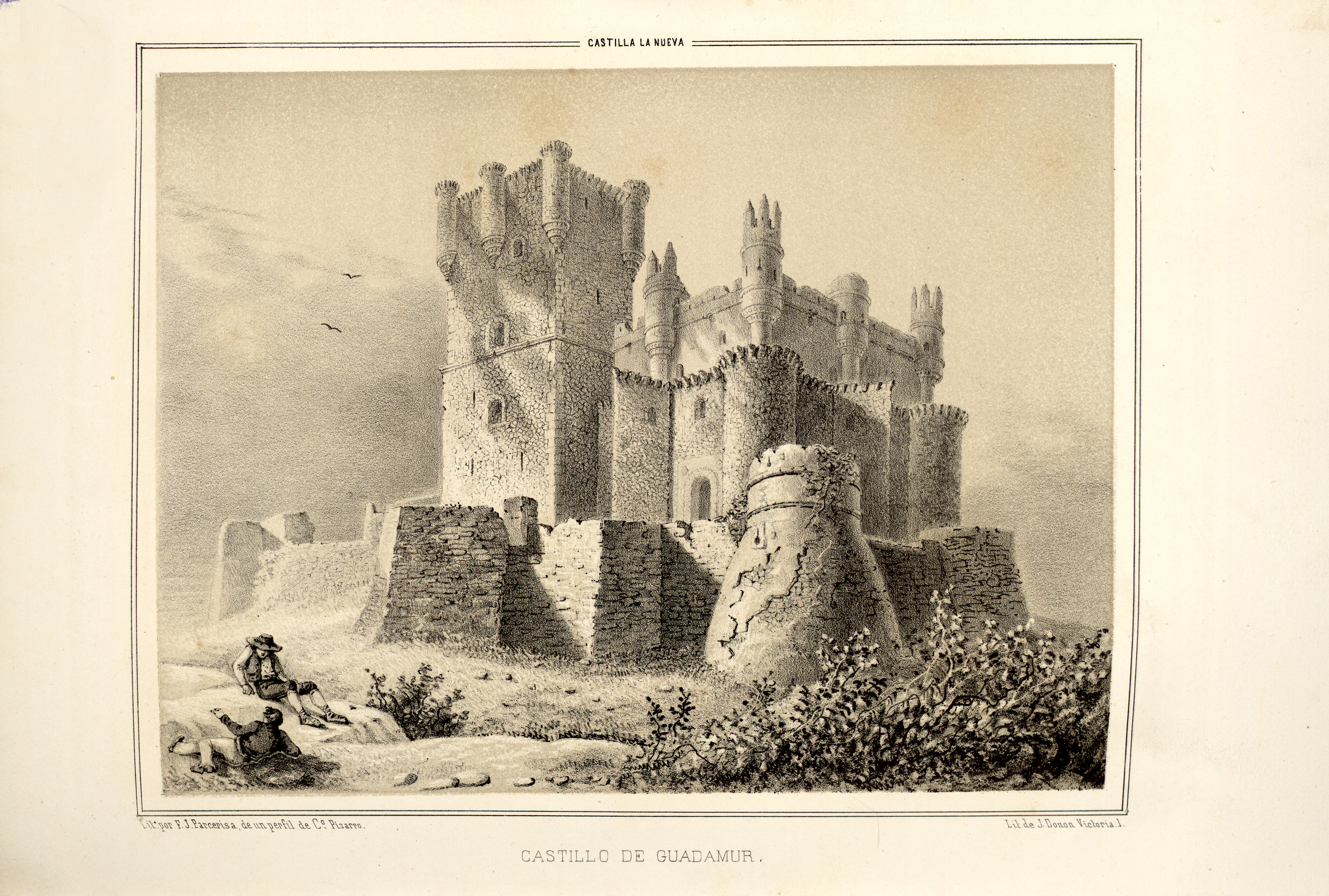
The castle, as depicted by Parcerisa in Recuerdos y bellezas de España (1853)

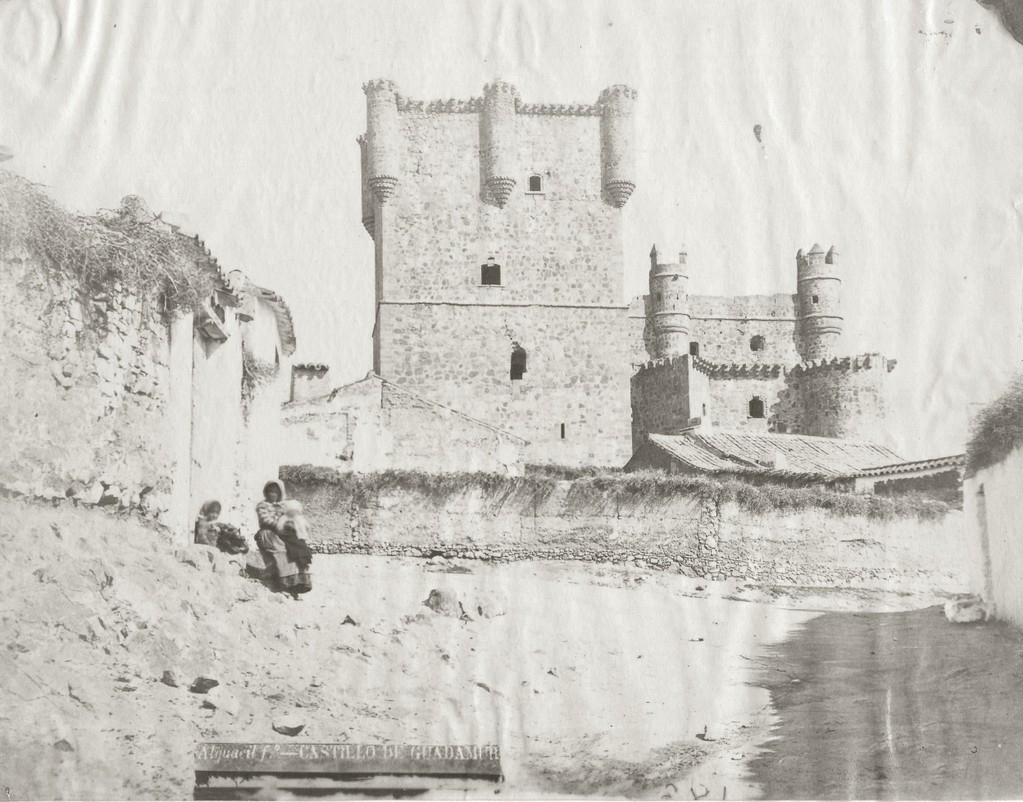
Photographed by Casiano Prado circa 1875
