= Votive crown =

Votive offering in medieval Europe

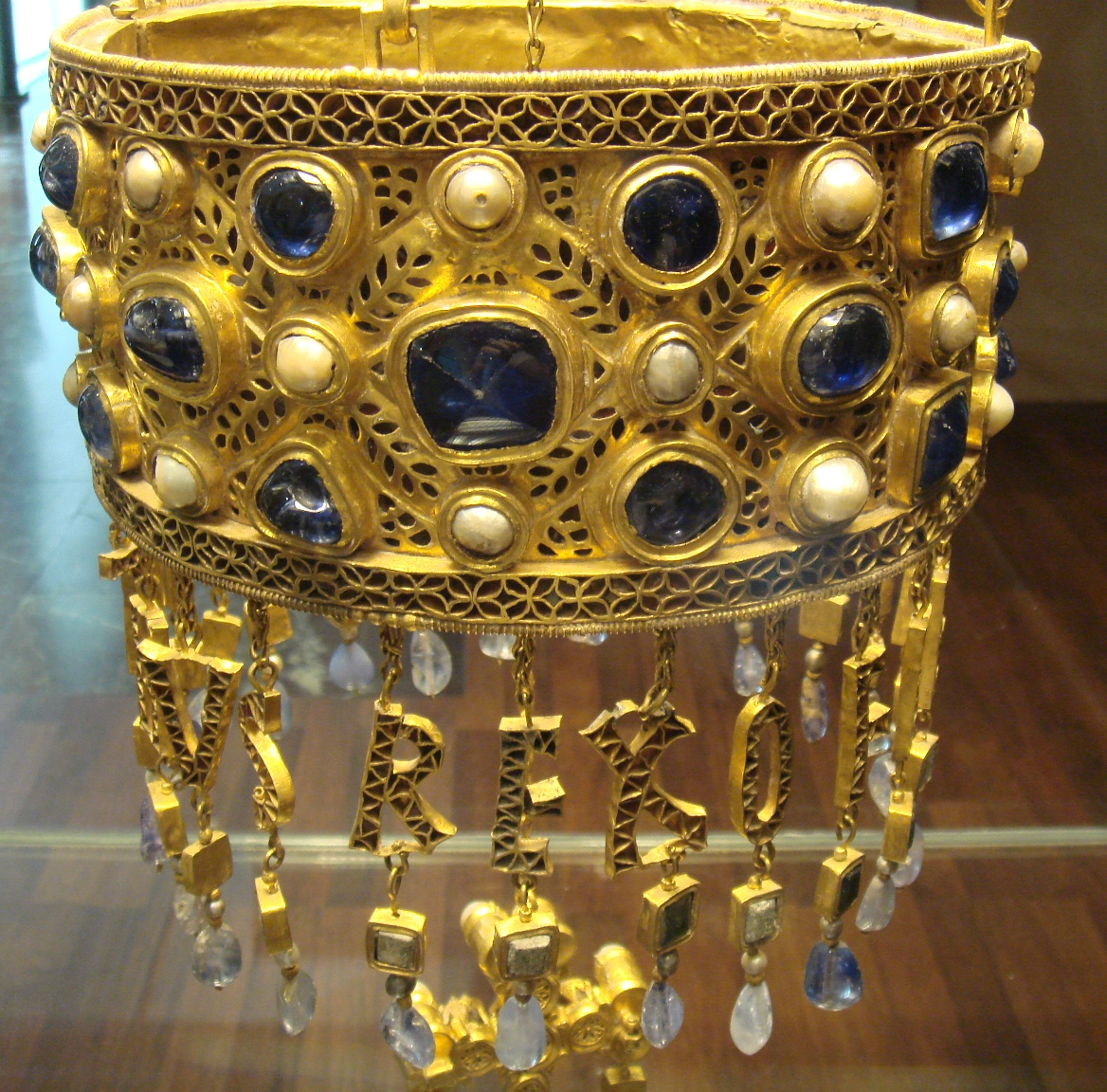
Detail of a suspended votive crown from Visigothic Spain, before 672 AD. Part of the Treasure of Guarrazar offered by Reccesuinth. Out of view are chains for suspension above, and a Byzantine pendant cross below. Alternate view.

A votive crown is a votive offering in the form of a crown, normally in precious metals and often adorned with jewels. Especially in the Early Middle Ages, they are of a certain form, designed to be suspended by chains at an altar, shrine or image. Later examples are often typical crowns in the style of the period, either designed to be placed on the head of a statue, or re-used in this way after donation.

== Pre-Christian examples ==
There were pagan votive crowns in the ancient world, although these are essentially known only from literary references. Vitruvius records that when Hiero II of Syracuse (died 215 BC) suspected his goldsmith of cheating him over the making of a votive crown for a statue in a temple, for which he had supplied the gold to be used, he asked Archimedes to devise a test. This led Archimedes to his famous eureka moment, after he realized he could test the crown by comparing its displacement of water to that of the same weight of pure gold; in fact the goldsmith had taken some gold and added silver instead. From other references, it seems that in classical times not just statues of the gods, but also living rulers were presented with crowns in the hope of a favourable response to a request.

== Suspended votive crowns ==
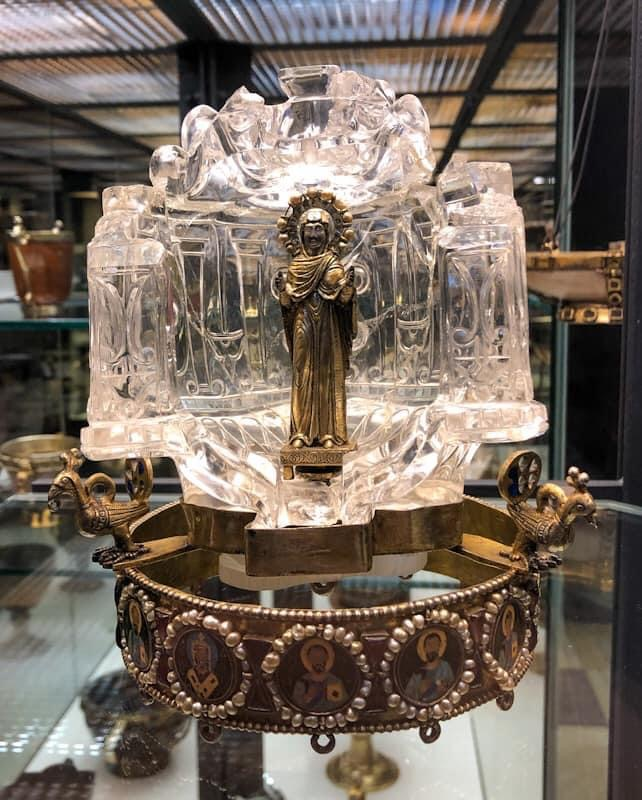
Byzantine votive crown, given by Leo VI (r. 886-912), now in the Treasury of San Marco, Venice

The largest number of surviving examples of the Christian early medieval suspended type come from 7th-century Visigothic Hispania, especially the Treasure of Guarrazar, from near Toledo, which includes no fewer than twenty-six examples in gold, probably hidden as the Muslim expansion drew near. These were excavated in 1859, and are now divided between the National Archaeological Museum of Spain in Madrid and the Musée de Cluny in Paris. However, the type was originally Roman or Byzantine, and adopted widely across Europe; nearly all these have been lost, as the objects were naturally extremely vulnerable to theft or looting. These could not be worn, as they were too small and also very often had pendilia, or dangling ornaments on chains hanging from the main crown, often with jewels and perhaps formed into letters which spelled a word or phrase. In the example above, the letters on the pendilia spell "RECCESVINTHVS REX OFFERET", or "King Recceswinth offered this". These royal donations signified the submission of the monarchy to God. Such objects were probably influenced by the thirty suspended gold crowns placed round the main altar of Hagia Sophia by Justinian, now lost, although the Christian practice is at least as old as the 4th century.

The main body of suspended crowns is usually flat around the top as well as the bottom rim; some are merely an open framework of flexibly linked metal pieces. Such crowns were probably found widely across Christian Europe in this period; the will of 572 of Aredius, a wealthy friend of Gregory of Tours in Gaul, describes a crown that sounds very similar in form to the Spanish examples. The Iron Crown of Lombardy was most probably made as a votive crown, although it was later used for the coronation of monarchs including Charles V and Napoleon I. Another gold crown was a source of contention in Constantinople; it was given to the Emperor Maurice (r. 582-602) by his wife Constantina and the dowager Empress Sophia for Easter 601, intended to be worn by him. Instead, he had it suspended by chains over the main altar of Hagia Sophia, upsetting the two ladies. It hung there for nearly two centuries, until Emperor Leo IV coveted it and took it for his own use. In a suspiciously neat story, the crown was richly decorated with carbuncles (jewels), and Leo, who was an iconoclast, soon after died of an outbreak of carbuncles (abscesses), allowing the church to draw the obvious conclusion; other stories said his wife had poisoned him. Another Byzantine votive crown, given by Leo VI (r. 886-912) is now in the Treasury of San Marco, Venice, and is decorated with cloisonné enamels.

== Statue votive crowns ==
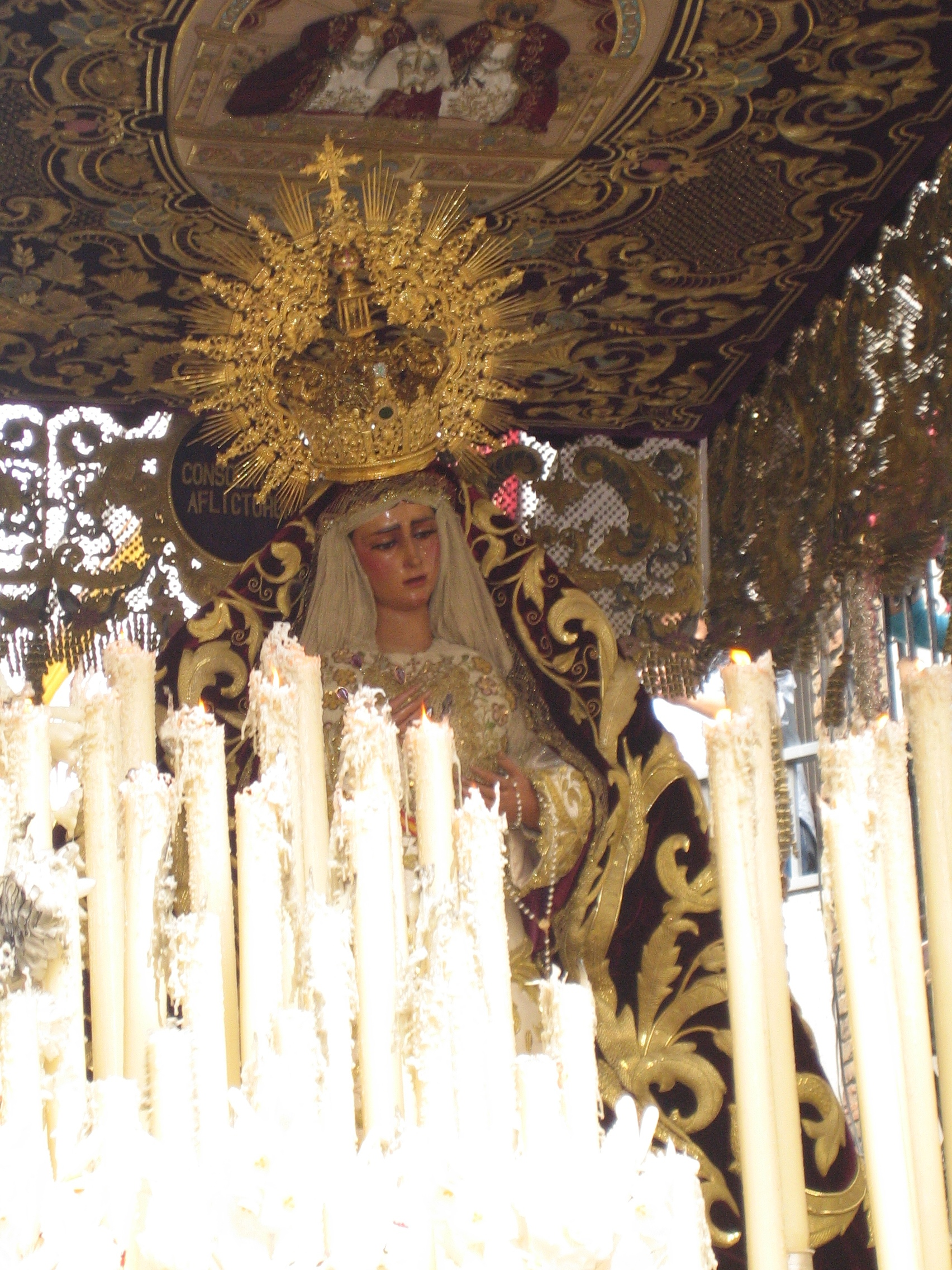
One of many crowned statues of the Virgin Mary carried in the processions of Holy Week in Seville.

In England, a later medieval source says that King Canute gave a, or "his", crown to be placed on or over ("super caput") the head of the rood, or large crucifix, in Winchester Cathedral (other notables decorated statues with their jewellery or a sword). The Anglo-Saxon Chronicle records that Hereward the Wake's men looted a solid gold crown from the head of the rood on the main altar of Peterborough Cathedral in 1070. The Romanesque period saw the height of crowned images of Christ, who is often shown wearing a crown on the cross in wood and metal figures, and manuscript illuminations, and also the introduction of crowned images of the Virgin Mary in the West, as the concept of Mary as Queen of Heaven became increasingly prominent.

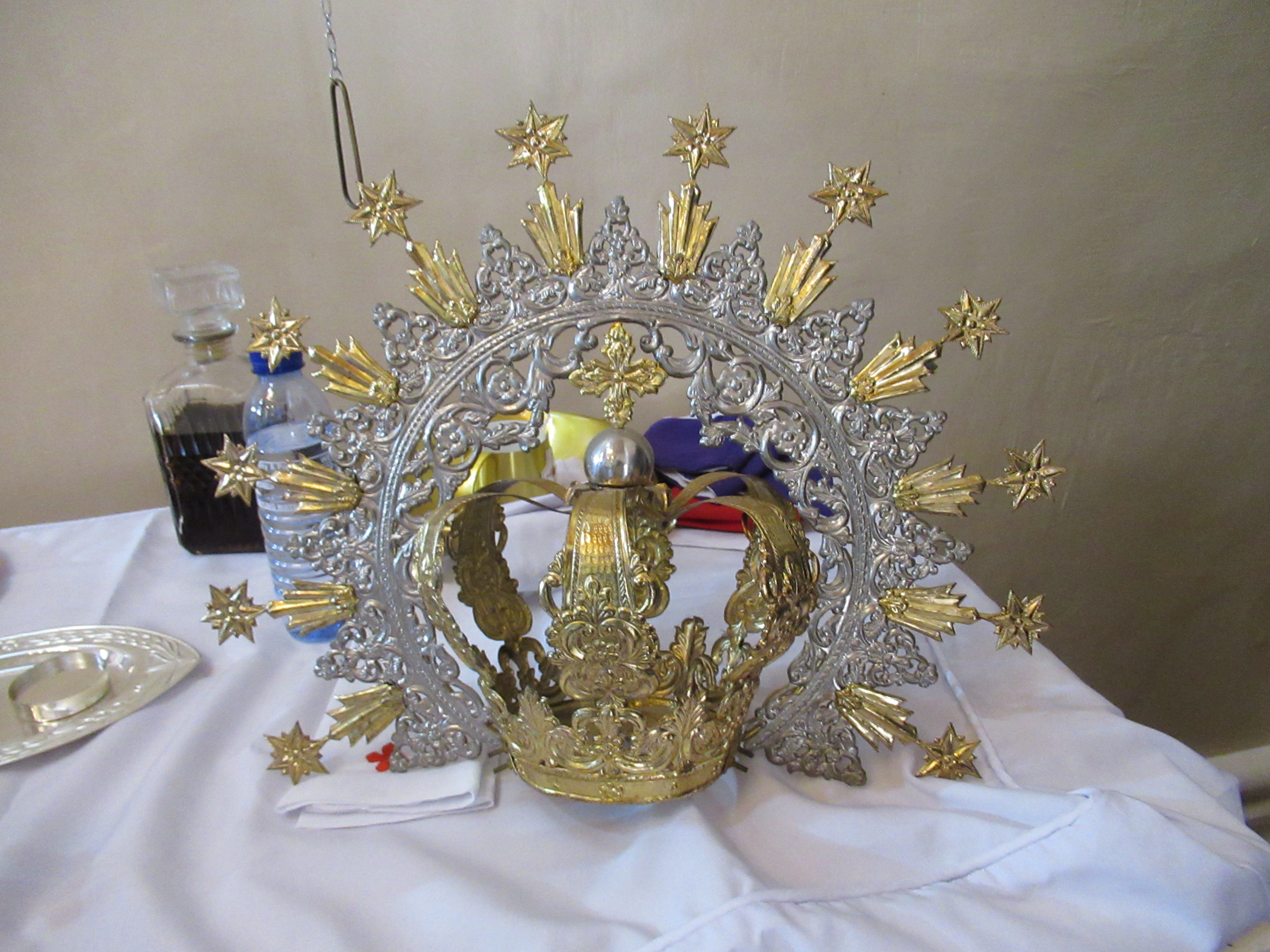
Statue crown temporarily removed, Obando Church, Philippines.

A very small late medieval crown now in the Treasury of Aachen Cathedral was made for the famously lavish wedding celebrations in 1468 of Margaret of York, Duchess of Burgundy, sister of Edward IV of England, and later placed on a statue of the Virgin Mary as a votive offering. It was designed to be worn on top of an elaborate headdress and hairstyle, or perhaps on a hennin, and is much smaller than a conventional crown for wearing directly on the head. This is now a rare example of a medieval votive crown that has survived above ground. A few years later, in 1487, the crown that had been used by the pretender Lambert Simnel was given to a statue of the Virgin in Dublin.

Crowns designed solely for statues became increasingly elaborate, especially in the Baroque period, and in the Spanish world; they often have a flat radiating "sunburst" around them, in the style used for monstrances, as in the example illustrated. Statues of the Virgin Mary and the Infant Jesus, of the Infant Jesus of Prague type, are among those most commonly crowned. The Crown of the Andes is a votive crown from Colombia in gold with 450 emeralds, apparently made between the late 16th and 18th centuries, perhaps originally as an offering in thanks for the city of Popayán being spared from a plague. It is now in private hands in the US.

== Contemporary examples ==
Votive crowns have continued to be produced in Catholic countries in modern times. Often such crowns were kept in the church treasury except for special occasions such as relevant feast-days, when they are worn by the statue. Christ and the Virgin Mary are frequently conventionally shown wearing crowns in Christian art, in subjects such as the Coronation of the Virgin, and are the most common figures to be crowned, but other saints may also be given crowns, especially if the saint was royal, or a martyr, as martyrs are promised crowns in heaven by many texts.

In Greece a tama or votive offering of, or depicting, two small wedding crowns, as used locally, indicates a request for a good marriage. Actual crowns used in ceremonies were normally retained by the couple.

== See also ==
Media related to Votive crowns at Wikimedia Commons
