= William Milliken (disambiguation) =

William Milliken (1922–2019) was the 44th Governor of Michigan.

William Milliken may also refer to:

- William H. Milliken Jr. (1897–1969), U.S. Representative from Pennsylvania
- William F. Milliken Jr. (1911–2012), American aerospace engineer
- William Milliken (Maine politician) who served in the 1850 Maine Senate
