= Treasure of Guarrazar =

Archaeological find from a site in Guadamur, Spain

Coordinates: 39°48′41″N 4°8′57″W

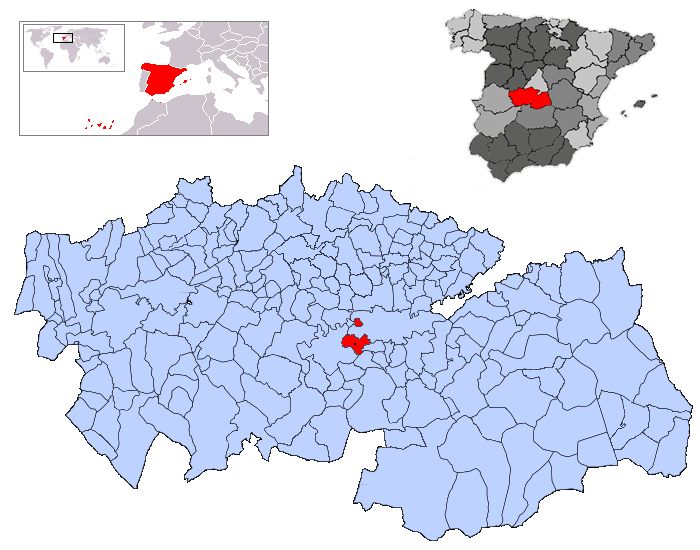
- Clockwise from top left: Spain; Province of Toledo within Spain; Guadamur within the province
- Material: Gold; Sapphires; Pearls; Other precious stones
- Size: 26 votive crowns and gold crosses, belts, other items
- Writing: Latin with Germanic lettering style
- Created: 7th century Hispania
- Discovered: 1858-1861; At remains of the monastery of Santa Maria de Sorbaces (?) at Guarrazar orchard & near it, Guadamur near Toledo, Spain
- Discovered by: A farmer (1858); José Amador de los Ríos for the Royal Academy of History & the Ministry of Public Works (1859)
- Present location: *National Archaeological Museum of Spain, Madrid (6 crowns, 5 crosses, a pendant, small remnants); *Musée de Cluny, Paris (3 crowns, 2 crosses, links and pendants); *Royal Palace of Madrid (a crown, a gold cross, a stone engraved with the Annunciation); *Royal Collections Gallery, Madrid; *Items sold in 1858, or stolen in 1921 (Suinthila's crown, fragments of a tiller with a crystal ball) and 1936, have disappeared.

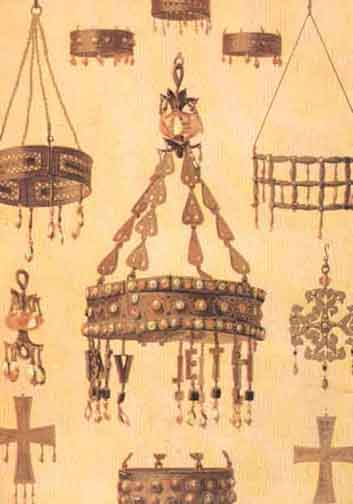
Votive crowns and crosses, from a 19th-century lithograph.

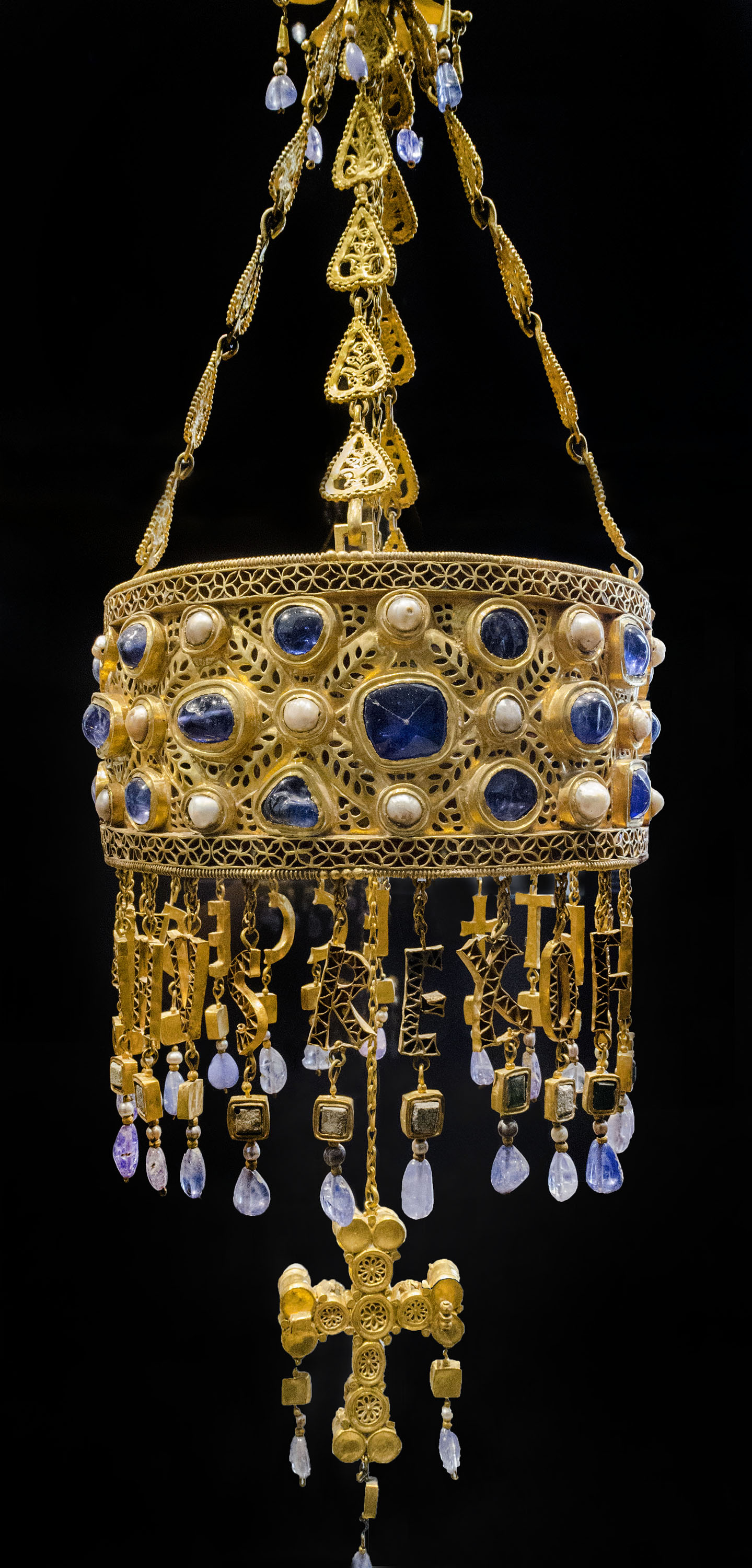
Votive crown of the Visigoth King Recceswinth, made of gold and precious stones in the 2nd half of the 7th century.

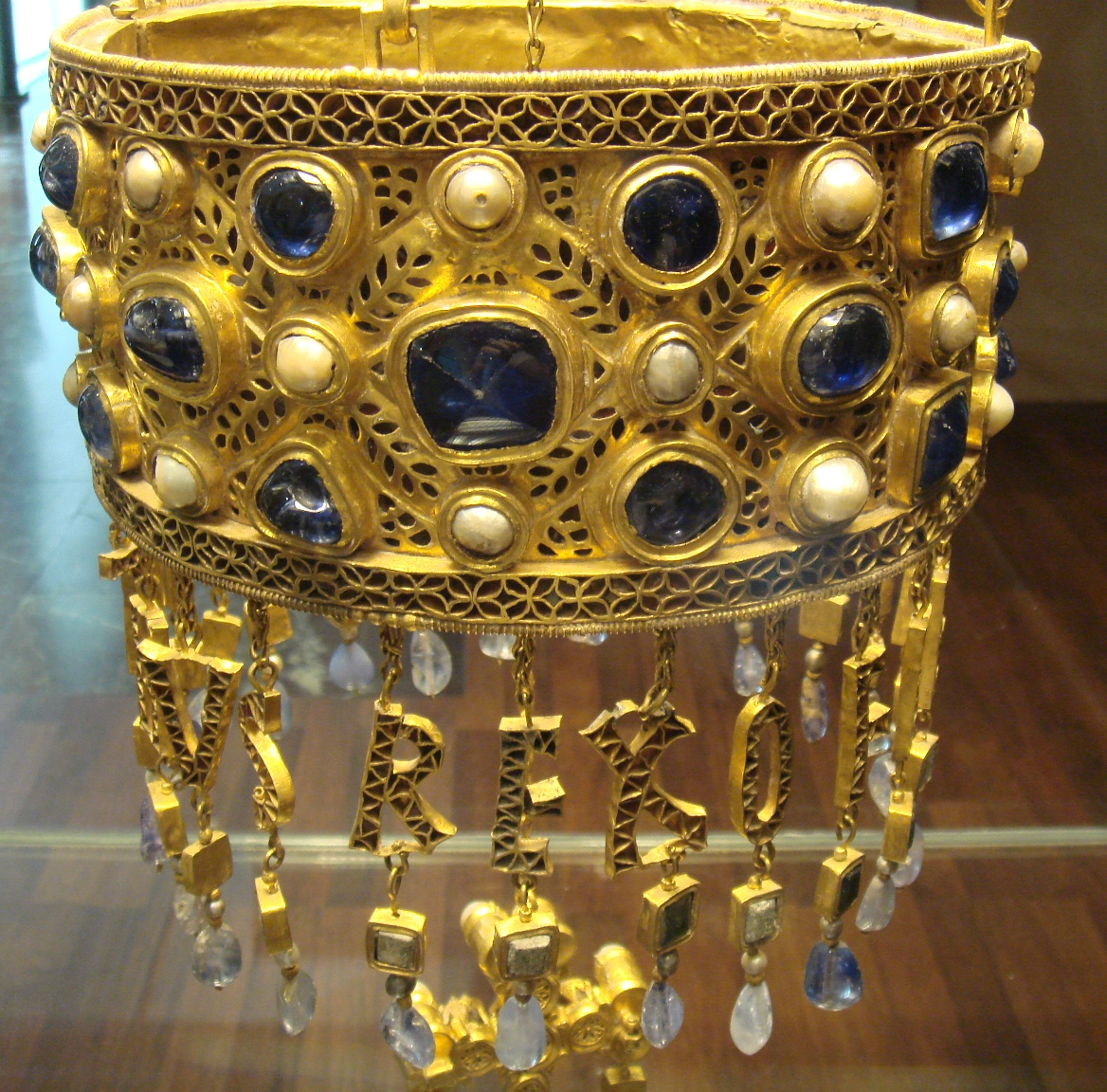
Detail of the votive crown of Recceswint hanging in Madrid. The hanging letters spell [R]ECCESVINTHVS REX OFFERET [King R. offers this].

The Treasure of Guarrazar, Guadamur, Province of Toledo, Castile-La Mancha, Spain, is an archeological find composed of twenty-six votive crowns and gold crosses that had originally been offered to the Catholic Church by the Visigoth kings in the seventh century in Hispania, as a gesture of the orthodoxy of their faith and their submission to the ecclesiastical hierarchy. The most valuable of all is the votive crown of king Recceswinth with its blue sapphires from Sri Lanka and pendilia. Though the treasure is now divided and much has disappeared, it represents the best surviving group of Early Medieval Christian votive offerings.

The treasure, which represents the high point of Visigothic gold craftsmanship, was dug up between 1858 and 1861 in an orchard called Guarrazar, in Guadamur, very close to Toledo, Spain. The treasure was divided, with some objects going to the Musée de Cluny in Paris and the rest to the armouries of the Palacio Real in Madrid (today in the National Archaeological Museum of Spain). In 1921 and 1936, some items of the Treasure of Guarrazar were stolen and have disappeared.

Some comparable Visigothic filigree gold was found in 1926 at Torredonjimeno in the province of Jaén, consisting of fragments of votive crowns and crosses.

== Description ==
The jewellery found at Guarrazar is part of a continuous tradition of Iberian metalworking that goes back to prehistoric times. These Visigothic works were influenced by the Byzantines, but the techniques of gem encrustation found at Guarrazar were practised throughout the Germanic world and the style of the lettering was Germanic too. The crowns were never meant to be worn by the kings. They were gifts to the church, to be hung above the altar.

The most valuable remaining pieces of the find are the two royal votive crowns: one of King Recceswinth and one of King Suinthila. Both are made of gold, encrusted with sapphires, pearls, and other precious stones. Suinthila's crown was stolen in 1921 and never recovered. There are several other small crowns and many votive crosses. There were belts in the original find as well, but these have since vanished.

These findings, together with other of some neighbors and with the archaeological excavation of the Ministry of Public Works and the Royal Academy of History (April 1859), formed a group consisting of:

- National Archaeological Museum of Spain: six crowns, five crosses, a pendant and remnants of foil and channels (almost all of gold).
- Royal Palace of Madrid: a crown and a gold cross and a stone engraved with the Annunciation. A crown, and other fragments of a tiller with a crystal ball were stolen from the Royal Palace of Madrid in 1921 and its whereabouts are still unknown.
- National Museum of the Middle Ages, Paris: three crowns, two crosses, links and gold pendants.

There were also many fragments of sculptures and the remains of a building, perhaps a Roman sanctuary or place of purification. After its rededication as a place of Christian worship - either a church or oratory -, it housed a number of graves. A skeleton lying on a bed of lime and sand was found in the best preserved grave. Its well-preserved stone slate has a Latin inscription that mentions a priest named Crispín, dating from 693 (year of the Sixteenth Council of Toledo). This slate is now in the National Archeological Museum of Spain in Madrid. The inscription on the Sónnica cross, a piece preserved in Paris, gives an indication about the name of this church.

INDI
NOM
INE
OFFERET SONNICA
SCE
MA
RIE
INS
ORBA
CES

In D[omin]i Nomine offeret Sonnica S[an]c[t]e Marie in Sorbaces

In the name of God, Sonnica offers [this] to Saint Mary in Sorbaces

According to some hypothesis, the monastery of Santa Maria de Sorbaces of Guarrazar served as a hideout for the real treasure of the court, Toledo churches and monasteries to prevent their capture by the Islamic conquest of Hispania.
