= Monastery of Santo Domingo el Real, Toledo =

Nunnery in Toledo, Spain

Coordinates: 39.8606°N 4.0272°W

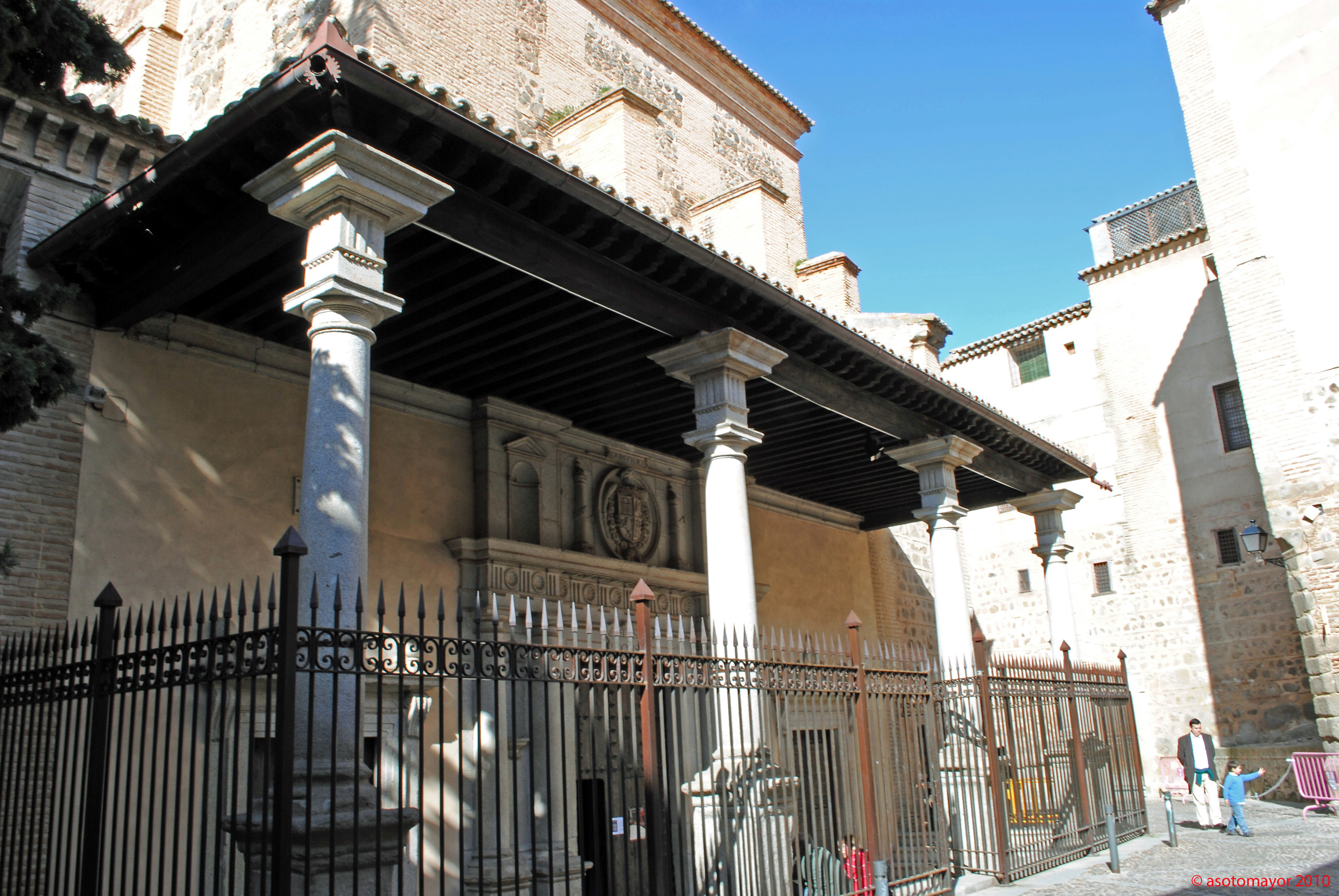
Monastery of Santo Domingo el Real

The Monastery of Santo Domingo Real, located in the city of Toledo, in Castile-La Mancha, Spain, is a convent founded in 1364 by the noblewoman Inés García de Meneses, daughter of García Suárez de Meneses and María Fernández Barroso, after she was widowed by Sancho de Velasco.

== History ==
It has been an enclosed convent since its beginnings and was the first in the city founded by the Dominican nuns. María de Castilla professed there. Maria was the daughter of King Peter of Castile and his lover, Teresa of Ayala. Teresa was the daughter of Diego Gómez de Toledo and his wife, Inés de Ayala, chancellor Pero López de Ayala's sister.

The monastery preserves in its archives numerous documents, including letters from the descendants of King Peter, since it became a "place of memory" for the king.

It was declared bien de interés cultural on June 15, 1934.

== Bibliography ==
- Francisco de Paula Cañas Gálvez (2010). Colección diplomática de Santo Domingo el Real de Toledo, Documentos reales I, 1249-1473. Madrid: Sílex Ediciones, S.L. pp. 148–150. ISBN 978-84-7737-248-6.
