= Madrid Ildefonsus =

Ildefonsus inspired by an angel (folio 100v)

The Madrid Ildefonsus (Madrid, Biblioteca Nacional de España, MS 10087) is a Romanesque illuminated manuscript of De virginitate Beatae Mariae, a Latin treatise on the Virgin Mary by the 7th-century writer Ildefonsus. It also contains two short biographies of Ildefonsus by Julian of Toledo and Cixila as well as a prologue to the De virginitate by Gómez de Albelda. The biography of Cixila, however, is misattributed to a certain Elladius.

The Madrid Ildefonsus contains 112 leaves of parchment. It was copied in Spain, probably at Toledo, around 1200 from the Parma Ildefonsus, which was itself copied a century earlier at the Abbey of Cluny in France. The Spanish scribe has corrected certain gallicisms found in the Cluniac text and added the missing chapters XI and XII from a Toledan manuscript. A 14th-century note added to the first folio indicates that at that time the manuscript was kept in the "library of the chaplains of the confraternity of the choir of Toledo Cathedral".

The Madrid Ildefonsus contains fourteen full-page miniatures, including seven from the life of Ildefonsus not found in the Parma manuscript, probably because the Toledans were more interested in their native saint's life than were the Cluniac monks. The sequence of decorated initials follows that of its exemplar. All four works within the manuscript are illustrated. The first two illustrations, of Ildefonsus leaving his parents and entering Agali monastery, accompany the text of Julian's biography. The next four accompany the main text, showing Ildefonsus praying to the Virgin and arguing with those whose views on Mary he is seeking to refute (Helvidius, Jovinian and the Jews). The prologue is accompanied by two illustrations, one of Ildefonsus being inspired to write by an angel and the other a presentation miniature showing Gómez presenting the original copy with the prologue to his patron, Bishop Godescalc of Le Puy. The final six miniatures illustrate Cixila's biography, ending with Ildefonsus' burial.

A comparison of the illustrations in the Madrid Ildefonsus and its model shows "the process of conversion of Romanesque forms between 1100 and 1200". The later style is more naturalistic and less schematic. The style of the Madrid illustrations is very similar to the contemporary frescoes in the Church of Cristo de la Luz in Toledo. Further work of the anonymous illustrator has also been identified in the Las Huelgas Beatus. One of his collaborators in the latter work also produced an illustrated copy of De virginitate Beatae Mariae, now Madrid, Biblioteca Nacional de España, MS 21546.

== Gallery ==
Textual decoration (folio 13r)

Ildefonsus leaves his parents (folio 4r)

Ildefonsus arguing with Helvidius (folio 16r)

Burial of Ildefonsus (folio 112r)

Gómez presents the prologue to Godescalc (folio 101r)

== Bibliography ==
- Schapiro, Meyer (1964). The Parma Ildefonsus: A Romanesque Illuminated Manuscript From Cluny and Related Works. College Art Association of America.
- Raizman, David Seth (1980). The Later Morgan Beatus (M.429) and Late Romanesque Illumination in Spain (PhD diss.). University of Pittsburgh. ProQuest 8028050
- Raizman, David Seth (1987). "A Rediscovered Illuminated Manuscript of St. Ildefonsus's De Virginitate Beatae Mariae in the Biblioteca Nacional in Madrid". Gesta. 26 (1): 37–46. JSTOR 767078.
