= Eugenius of Toledo =

Eugenius of Toledo may refer to:

- Eugenius I of Toledo (died 647), archbishop
- Eugenius II of Toledo (died 657), archbishop, poet and saint
