= Gómez de Albelda =

Gómez at work, from the Parma Ildefonsus of c. 1100

Gómez de Albelda (fl. 951) was a monk and scribe of the monastery of San Martín de Albelda in the Kingdom of Pamplona.

In the winter of 950–951, Gómez executed a commission from Bishop Godescalc of Le Puy, who was staying in the monastery on his way to the shrine of Saint James in Galicia. The work copied was De uirginitate sanctae Mariae, a Latin treatise by Ildefonsus on the perpetual virginity of Mary, which the bishop found in Albelda's library.

To his copy of Ildefonsus's treatise, Gómez added a prologue (prologus) in Latin describing the circumstances in which it was made. The autograph manuscript of the prologue including the copy of De uirginitate made for Godescalc is preserved today in Paris, Bibliothèque nationale de France, MS latin 2855. It is the ancestor of a family of manuscripts of De uirginitate. They have in common is that the last two chapters of the work are missing because the text in Albelda's library was incomplete.

Around 1100, an illuminated copy of Latin 2855 was made, now known as the Parma Ildefonsus, in which the prologue itself was moved to the end of the manuscript and illustrated with miniatures depicting Gómez writing and Gómez giving the book to the bishop. The Parma Ildefonsus itself spawned a family of manuscripts treating the prologue as a postscript. This family also alters the spelling of Góme's name from his original Gomes to Gomesanus. The illustrations of Gómez were not usually copied, save in the Madrid Ildefonsus from around 1200.

Autograph copy of Gómez's prologue in Visigothic script

Gómez's prologue has been translated into French and Spanish. Writing in the first person, he introduces himself as "unworthy" (indignus) yet exercizing the functions of a presbyter in the monastery of Albelda "within the borders of Pamplona" (in finibus Pampilonae). He names his abbot, Dulquitius, and mentions that there are 200 brothers at Albelda in his time. He explains how, "compelled" (compulsus) by the holy (sancto) Godescalc, who was travelling from Aquitaine to the shrine of Saint James, he "happily" (libenter) copied the "little book" (libellus) of Ildefonsus on the virginity of Mary, "perpetual virgin" (perpetuae uirginis). He then briefly describes the contents of the book. Ildefonsus "by the sword of the word of God" (gladio uerbi Dei) wounds the heresy of Jovinian, then destroys the error of Helvidius by reason and finally kills the obduracy of the Jews. Gómez notes that Godescalc is taking the manuscript back to his diocese, which he calls by its original name, Sainte-Marie d'Anis (Sanctae Mariae Anitio), in January of the year 989 of the Spanish era, which is AD 951. He ends with a historical note: in those days King Ramiro of Galicia died (ipsis igitur diebus obiit Galleciensis rex Ranimirus). Ramiro II of León abdicated on 5 January 951 to his son, Ordoño III, and died shortly afterwards.

== Bibliography ==
- Cuenca Muñoz, Paloma (2018). "Dos copistas en el siglo X: Gómez de Cardeña y Gómez de Albelda". Hispania Sacra. 70 (142): 423–431.
- Jacomet, Humbert (2009). "Gotescalc, évêque de Sainte-Marie d'Anis, pèlerin de Saint-Jacques (950–951)". Compostelle. 12: 9–44.
- Rucquoi, Adeline; Michaud-Fréjaville, Françoise; Picone, Philippe, eds. (2018). Le Voyage à Compostelle: Du X^{e} au XX^{e} siècle. Bouquins.
- Schapiro, Meyer (1964). The Parma Ildefonsus: A Romanesque Illuminated Manuscript From Cluny and Related Works. College Art Association of America.
- Yarza Urquiola, Valeriano (2016). "El Prólogo de Gómez, presbítero de Albelda". Cuadernos de Filología Clásica: Estudios Latinos. 36 (2): 213–232.
