= Church of San Bartolomé (Toledo) =

Medieval church in Castile-La Mancha, Spain

Coordinates: 39.8549°N 4.0260°W

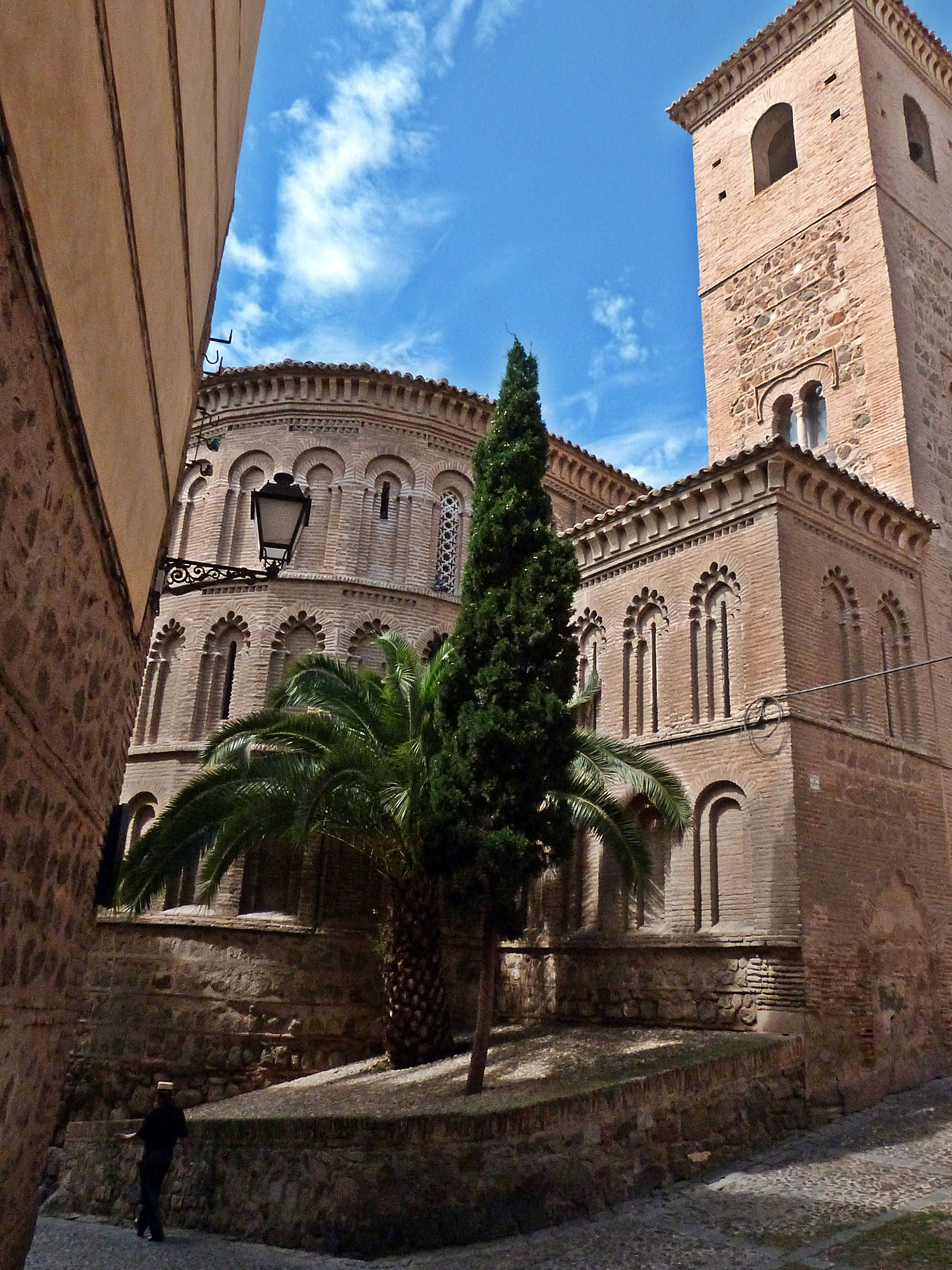
Iglesia de San Bartolomé

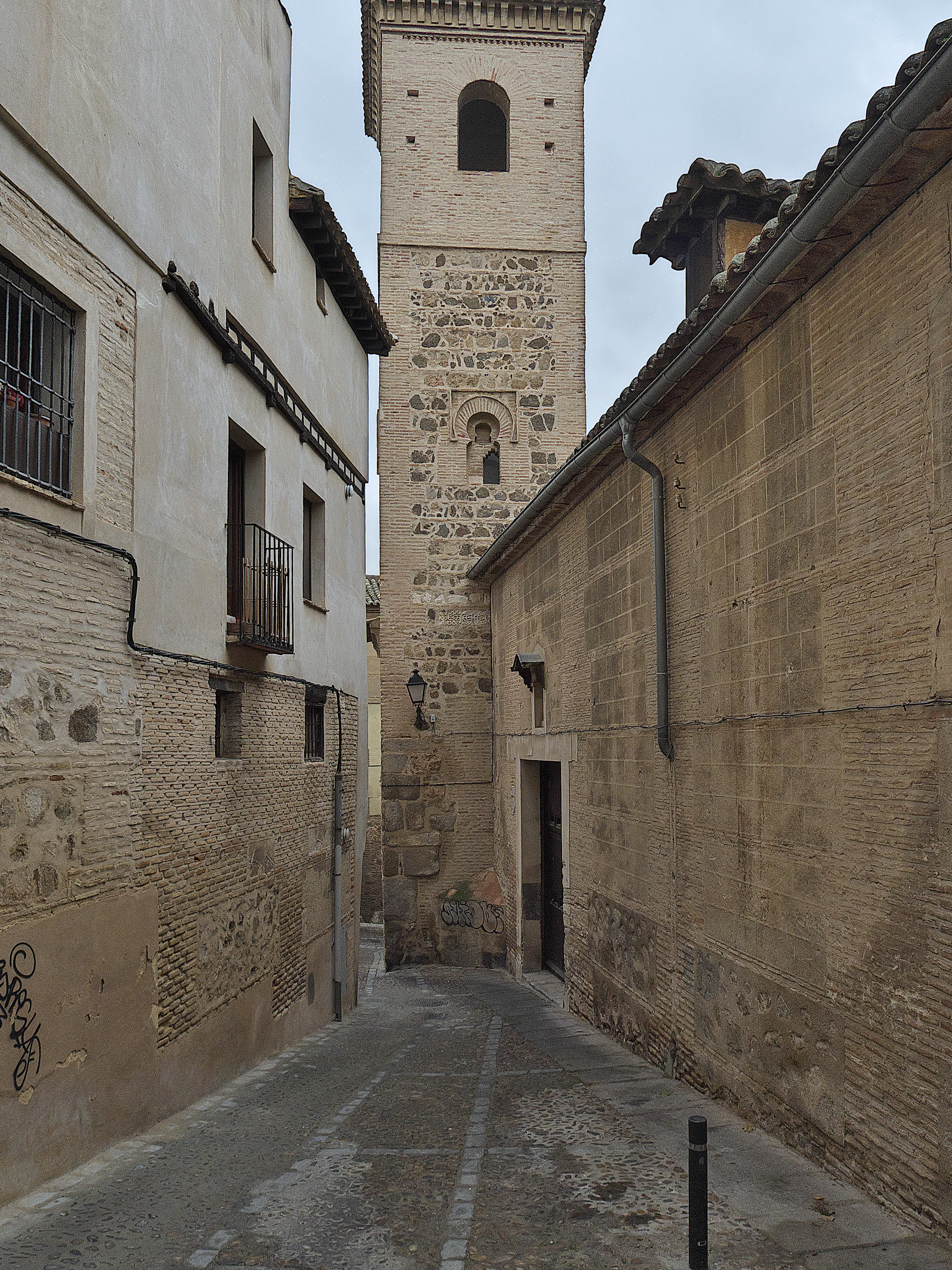
Tower of the church

The Church of San Bartolomé is a medieval building in Toledo, in Castile-La Mancha, Spain. It is located in the southern part of the walled city, at the corner of calle San Bartolomé and calle Cristo de la Para, a few hundred meters south-west of the Cathedral of Santa María.

== History ==
This Mudéjar style church has undergone several reconstructions over the centuries.

From the end of the 15th century works modify the primitive structure. In the section of the presbytery, taking advantage of the thickness of the walls, are accommodated two small funerary chapels.

It was renovated in the 19th century to serve a convent of nuns. The Jerónimas de la Reina occupied the next-door palace, by donation of the Empress Eugénie de Montijo. The palace and the church were initially separated by an alley until 1877 when they were connected by the wall that can be seen today along the descent of San Bartolomé. After further restoration work was undertaken in 1957, it then served as a priestly house and is currently a Major Seminary. In spite of the successive adaptations necessary for the present uses, the structure of the old Renaissance palace was maintained, though clear indications of profound modernization was done in the 19th century, organized with dependencies around an irregular courtyard.

In 1998 the church was declared a Property of Cultural Interest by the Spanish government.

== Description ==
The oldest part of the church dates back to 1145; But the central apse, following a model very close to the churches of Cristo de la Vega or San Vicente, does not seem any earlier than the 13th century.

=== Tower ===
The oldest part of the church is the tower, now incorporated in the nave of the Gospel, but originally external. Its medieval condition was exposed during a restoration campaign in 1940. It is modeled directly from a Muslim minaret, as in the Church of Santiago, Toledo with which it has obvious similarities:

- the inner structure -lanta with tenon central bulk and use of slabs staggered brick saledizo
- on the outside - the way in which the layers of masonry are boxed in by brickwork
- above all the presence of a window with double horseshoe arch and alfiz, identical to that of Santiago del Arrabal.

As in Santiago del Arrabal, on whose walls appear some reused Visigoth reliefs, although fewer than in the tower of the church of San Salvador. It could be dated to the first half of the thirteenth century; although, some authors confer greater seniority.

=== Elevation ===
In the church several reconstructions are perceived that have modified the primitive plant. The oldest appointment of the same one is of 1145; but the central apse, which follows a model very close to that of Cristo de la Vega or San Vicente, does not seem to be before the end of the thirteenth century. Like those other temples, its structure would correspond to a church with only one nave; which can be verified in view of the thickness of the old exterior walls of the apse, incorporated in the current presbytery, and used at the end of the XV century, to open small chapels.

The widening of the church from one to three naves, posed a problem of integration where they met the existing apse, a problem that was solved by means of two square spaces, whose exterior walls repeat the organization of the arcade game of the central apse, where the first floor is made up of arches of half a point, the second of arches califales with polilobulado trasdós and the third and superior of arches califales with arches of horseshoe arch. The proximity of the date of construction, between this and those, would justify the extraordinary similarity in the technique and typology of the arches, which makes them appear to constitute the same work.
