= Las Huelgas Beatus =

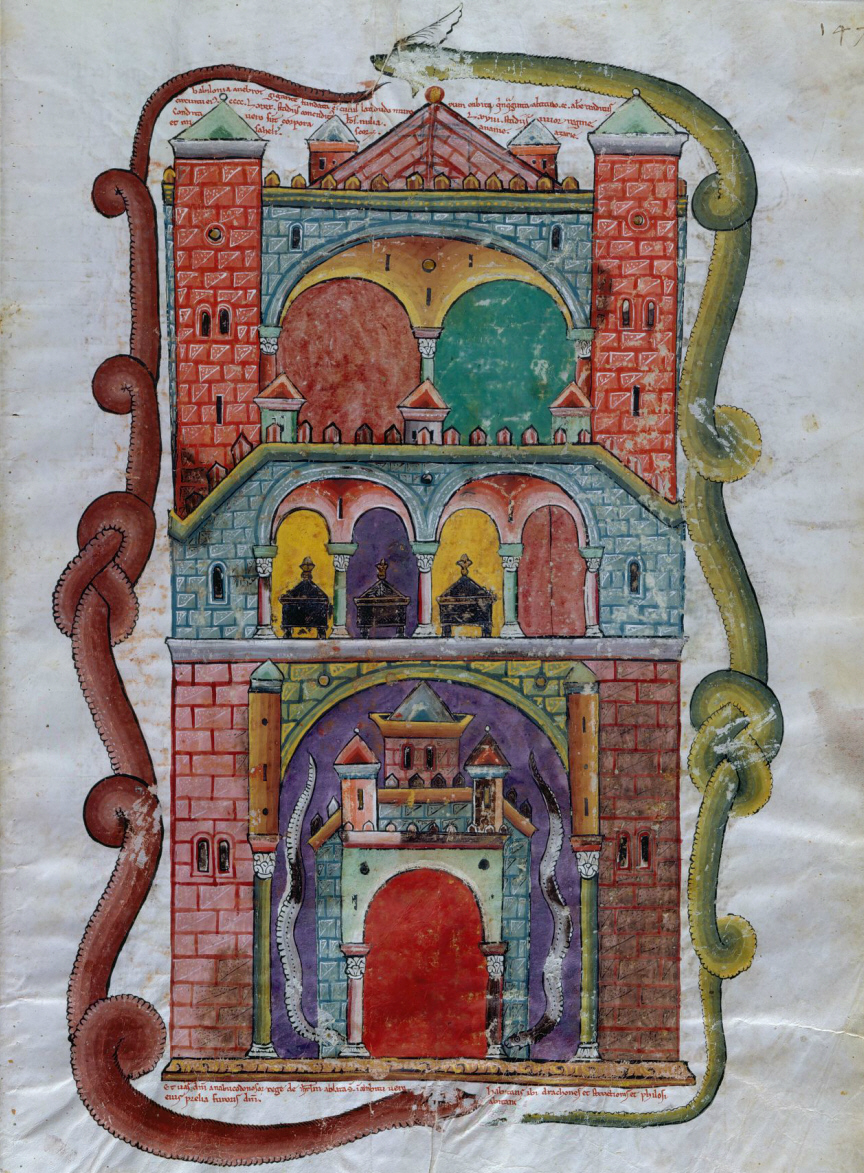
Babylon surrounded by a serpent

The Las Huelgas Beatus, also called the Later Morgan Beatus, is a late Romanesque illuminated manuscript of Beatus of Liébana's Commentary on the Apocalypse completed in September 1220 and now housed in the Morgan Library & Museum in New York, shelfmark M.429. It is one of the latest illuminated copies of Beatus' commentary and a copy of the 10th-century Tábara Beatus. It was produced for the Abbey of Santa María la Real de Las Huelgas in Burgos, but whether it was produced there or elsewhere is unknown. Its artists had known connections to Toledo, also in Castile.

The Las Huelgas Beatus is the largest illuminated Beatus manuscript, at 21 by 13.3 inches (530 mm × 340 mm), and contains 184 parchment leaves. Three artists worked on it. The hands of two of them have been identified in two other manuscripts. One of them worked on Madrid, Biblioteca Nacional, 10087 and the other worked on Madrid, Biblioteca Nacional, 21546, both copies of Ildefonsus' De virginitate Beatae Mariae. The former artist was also responsible for the frescoes in the Church of Cristo de la Luz, a converted mosque in Toledo. Stylistically, the artists are indebted to Byzantine precedents.

The manuscript may have been royally sponsored. A colophon praises the nameless patroness who commissioned the manuscript for donation to Las Huelgas. Two women have been identified as likely donors: Queen Berengaria and the Abbess Sancha García. If Berengaria were the donar, she probably commissioned the work to celebrate two events that took place in Las Huelgas in November 1219: the knighting of her son, King Ferdinand III, and Ferdinand's marriage to Beatrice of Swabia.

Notes added to the manuscript in the 17th century show that it continued to be used within the abbey for readings. It was in the library of Las Huelgas when Enrique Flórez saw it in the 18th century. The dealer who sold it to its current owner, the Morgan, purchased it from the Convent of San Clemente de Toledo. It is unknown when it moved to San Clemente or whether its production was connected with that place, a daughter house of Las Huelgas.

== Bibliography ==
- Raizman, David Seth (1980). The Later Morgan Beatus (M.429) and Late Romanesque Illumination in Spain (PhD diss.). University of Pittsburgh. ProQuest 8028050
- Raizman, David Seth (1987). "A Rediscovered Illuminated Manuscript of St. Ildefonsus's De Virginitate Beatae Mariae in the Biblioteca Nacional in Madrid". Gesta. 26 (1): 37–46. JSTOR 767078.
- Williams, John (2017). Martin, Therese (ed.). Visions of the End in Medieval Spain: Catalogue of Illustrated Beatus Commentaries on the Apocalypse and Study of the Geneva Beatus. Amsterdam University Press.
