= Sant'Ildefonso, Milan =

Church in Milan

Church of Sant'Ildefonso
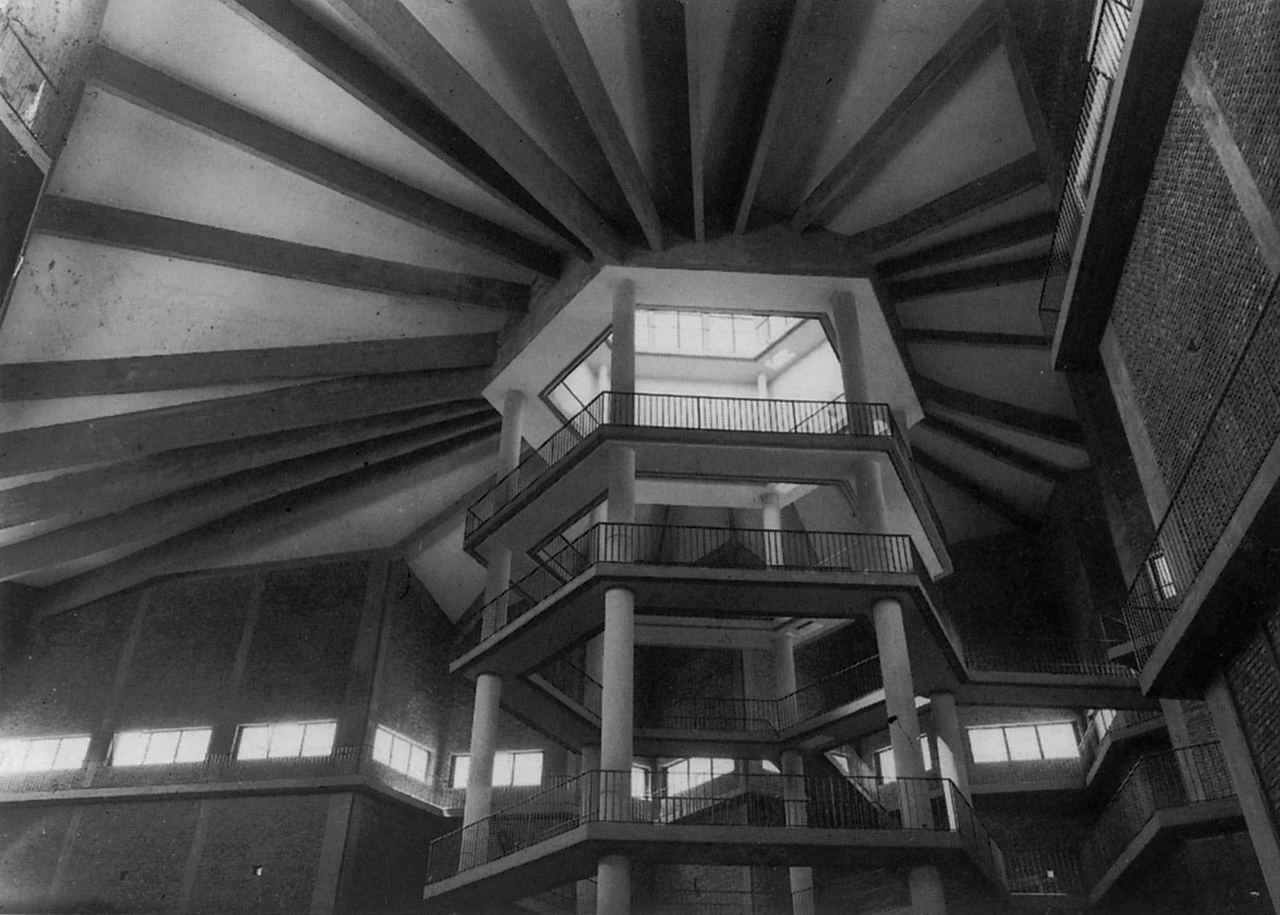

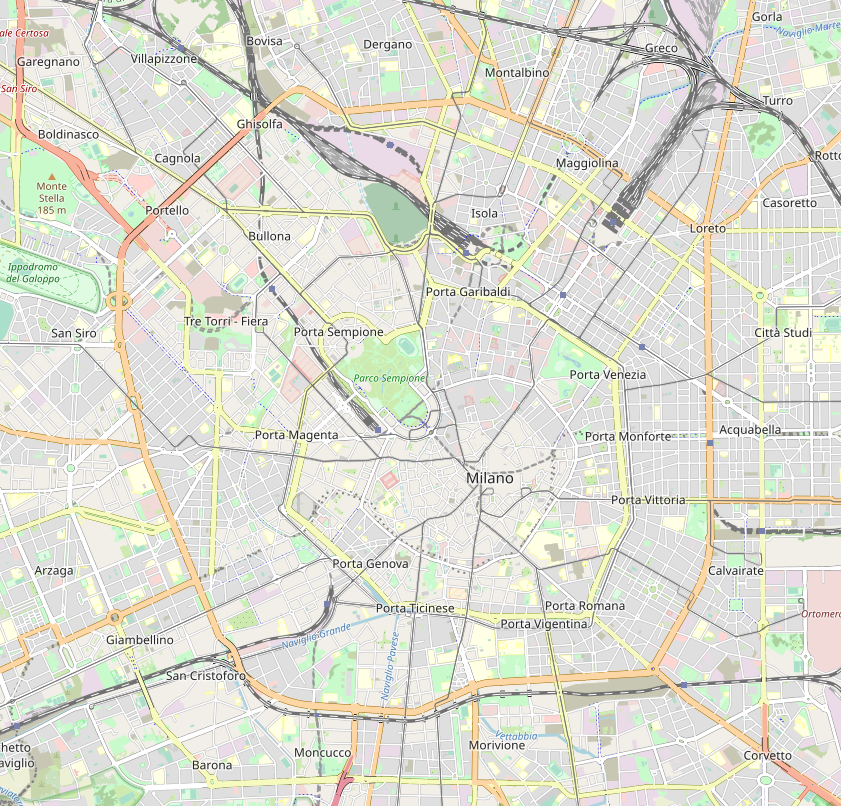
- Location within Milan

Religion
- Affiliation: Roman Catholic
- Province: Milan
- Year consecrated: 1956
- Status: Active

Location
- Location: Milan, Italy
- Coordinates: 45.48436°N 9.15521°E

Architecture
- Architect: Carlo De Carli (1910-1999)
- Type: Church
- Style: Modern
- Groundbreaking: 1953

Website
- Comunita Nozze di Cana

Sant'Ildefonso is a Modernist-style Roman Catholic church in Milan, region of Lombardy, Italy.

== History ==
While dedicated to St Ildefonsus of Toledo, the church commemorates the beatified Cardinal Ildefonso Schuster, archbishop of Milan from 1929 to 1954. It was commissioned by the Curia and the successor of Schuster, archbishop Giovanni Battista Montini (who later became Pope Paul VI), as a group of 22 new churches to celebrate upcoming church council (Second Vatican Council). At the consecration Montini expressed that “this monument of prayer is a new expression of art, aimed at seeking a world that is so difficult for us to reach and express, that of the spirit”. The architect was Carlo De Carli, who also designed the church of San Gerolamo Emiliani on via Don Giovanni Calabria. Construction took place from 1953 to 1956.

== Description ==
The somewhat plain convex facade does not convey the layout, best appreciated from above. In the center is a hexagonal main altar, which is crowned by three floors of catwalks on columns. The openness of the plan was described by the architect as the possibility of vertical access to every level of the church not only responds to a need for maintenance and a possibility of decoration but it brings the sense of possible and complete contact with every part of the church; the sense of a path that can be followed towards that unity which already determined the compositional motifs through the hexagon. The altar is naturally illuminated through a large skylight window. The organ pipes are on the western axis of the altar. The ground floor has no windows; each rising floor has increasing window access to light. The pavement has a spokes of white stone lines slicing the wood floor.
