= Godescalc (bishop of Le Puy) =

Gómez presenting his work to Godescalc, from the Parma Ildefonsus of c. 1100

Godescalc, also spelled Gotdescalc, Gotescalc or Gotiscalc (died 1 December 961), was the bishop of Le Puy-en-Velay from between 927 and 935 until his death. He inaugurated the Way of Saint James, as the first person known by name to have gone on a pilgrimage to the shrine of James the Great at Santiago de Compostela.

== Abbot and bishop ==
Prior to becoming bishop, Godescalc was a Benedictine monk and the abbot of Saint-Chaffre. He seems to have remained as abbot until at least 937, when he introduced the Benedictine Reform.

The earliest reference to Godescalc as bishop is from March of the sixth year of the reign of Rudolf, when a noblewoman named Blismodis donated a small cell to the church of Le Puy in honour of Bishops Adalard, Hector and Godescalc. The year of this document, however, is uncertain, because Rudolf was not immediately accepted as king throughout France after deposing Charles III in 923. His sixth year could be 929 or 935, six years after the death of the captive Charles. Godescalc was bishop by 935, but since the death date of Hector is unknown, he may have been bishop as early as 927.

On 28 August 936, he was present at the founding of the monastery of Chanteuges, alongside the founder, Cunabert; Count Raymond Pons of Toulouse; and the viscount of Velay, Dalmace I. In 937, he gave land to Saint-Chaffre and introduced reforming monks from Aurillac Abbey.

== Pilgrimage ==
Start of Ildefonsus' treatise in the copy made by Gómez for Godescalc

In 950–951, Godescalc travelled to Galicia to see the relics of Saint James in the cathedral of Santiago de Compostela. He was probably inspired by the example of Abbot Maiolus of Cluny, who in 950 travelled to Le Puy to pray to the Virgin at its shrine.

He stopped en route at the monastery of San Martín de Albelda, where he commissioned the monk Gómez to copy a treatise by Ildefonsus on the Virgin, De uirginitate sanctae Mariae, which found in San Martín's library. He is not the first recorded foreign pilgrim to Santiago, but he is the first known by name. The prologue or colophon written by Gómez and addressed to Godescalc was copied around 1100 into a deluxe illuminated manuscript, now known as the Parma Ildefonsus, where there is an illustration of Gómez giving his book to the bishop. The same presentation scene is also depicted in the Madrid Ildefonsus from around 1200.

== Later years ==
In 955, Godescalc obtained confirmation from King Lothair of the bishop of Le Puy's temporal rights over the town itself (the ancient Anicium), which had been granted to Adalard by Rudolf in 924. In 961, Count Raymond I of Rouergue, the cousin of Raymond Pons, made a major donation of land to the cathedral of Le Puy.

In 961, Godescalc consecrated the chapel of Saint Michel d'Aiguilhe, founded by the dean of the cathedral chapter, Truannus. He died on 1 December that year and was succeeded by Bego.

== Bibliography ==
- Bourbon, Louis (1965). "L'évêque Gotdescalc et la tradition compostellane". Príncipe de Viana. 26 (98–99): 69–74.
- Cubizolles, Pierre (2005). Le diocèse du Puy-en-Velay des origines à nos jours. Éditions Créer.
- Fraisse, Hippolyte (1873–1874). "Adalard et Hector, évêques du Puy (915–926)". Tablettes historiques du Velay. 4: 411–422.
- Fraisse, Hippolyte (1874–1875). "Gotescalc, évêque du Puy de 927 à 962". Tablettes historiques du Velay. 5: 1–16.
- Jacomet, Humbert (2009). "Gotescalc, évêque de Sainte-Marie d'Anis, pèlerin de Saint-Jacques (950–951)". Compostelle. 12: 9–44.
- Lauranson-Rosaz, Christian (2004). "Gotiscalc, évêque du Puy (928–962)". In Sylvain Gougenheim (ed.). Retour aux sources: Textes, études et documents d'histoire médiévale offerts à Michel Parisse. Picard. pp. 653–667.
- Reynolds, Roger E. (2014). "A Precious Ancient Souvenir Given to the First Pilgrim to Santiago de Compostela". Peregrinations: Journal of Medieval Art and Architecture. 4 (3).
- Rocher, Charles (1873). Les rapports de l'église du Puy avec la ville de Girone en Espagne et le comté de Bigorre. Bérard.
- Rucquoi, Adeline; Michaud-Fréjaville, Françoise; Picone, Philippe, eds. (2018). Le Voyage à Compostelle: Du X^{e} au XX^{e} siècle. Bouquins.
- Schapiro, Meyer (1964). The Parma Ildefonsus: A Romanesque Illuminated Manuscript From Cluny and Related Works. College Art Association of America.
- Yarza Urquiola, Valeriano (2016). "El Prólogo de Gómez, presbítero de Albelda". Cuadernos de Filología Clásica: Estudios Latinos. 36 (2): 213–232.

Catholic Church titles
Preceded by Hector	Bishop of Le Puy; 927/935–961	Succeeded by Bego
