= The Immaculate Conception (El Greco, Toledo) =

c. 1610 painting by El Greco

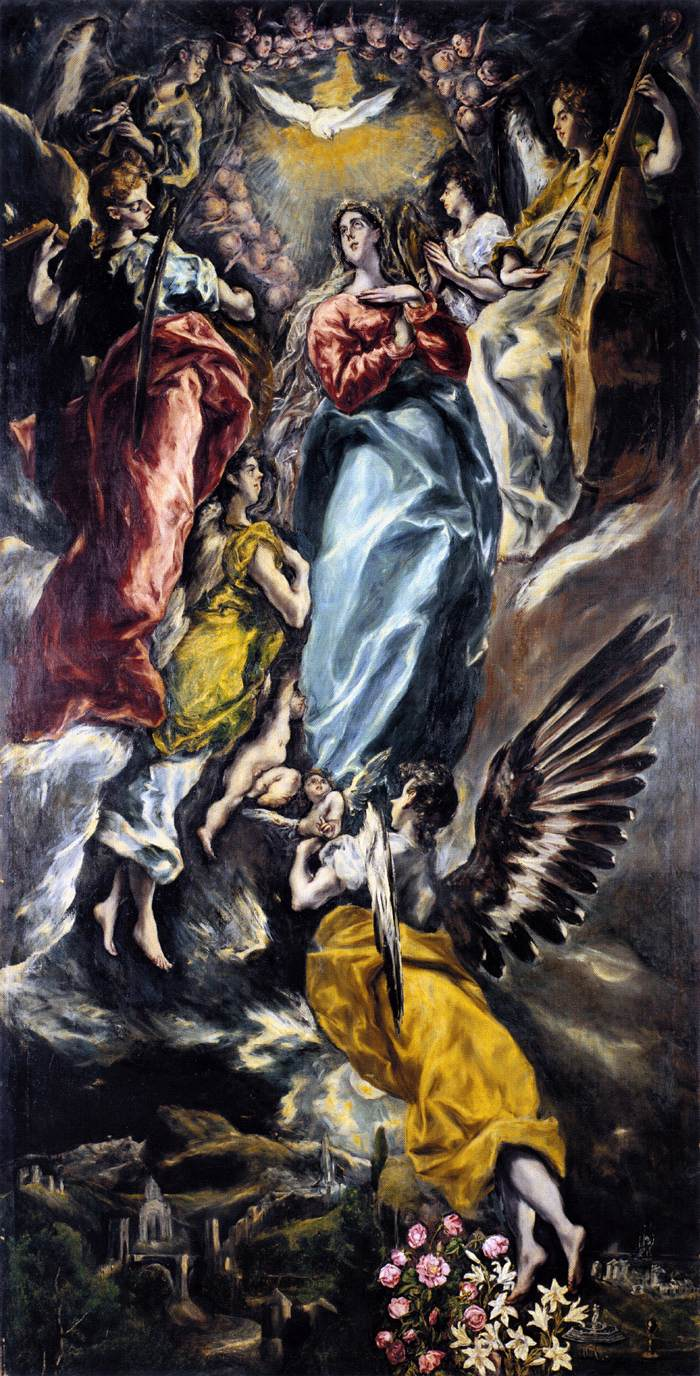
- Artist: El Greco
- Year: 1607–1613
- Medium: Oil on canvas
- Dimensions: 348 cm × 174.5 cm (137 in × 68.7 in)
- Location: Museum of Santa Cruz, Toledo, Spain

The Virgin of the Immaculate Conception is a painting of the Immaculate Conception by El Greco. The work on the painting began in 1607 and was completed in 1613. It is owned by the church of San Nicolás de Bari in Toledo, Spain. It is displayed, however, in the Museum of Santa Cruz in Toledo, Spain.

== Background ==
El Greco immersed himself in the Italian Renaissance during his stay in Venice and Rome, which allowed him to experiment with the opposing colore and disegno techniques for size. Afterwards, El Greco relocated to Toledo in 1577, and this move signified the beginning of his vital role in the Spanish Renaissance movement. He left behind a circle of like-minded individuals in Italy, mostly scholars and fellow artists, who shared the belief that a virtuoso, or a true artist, was one that surpassed basic craftsmanship into the realm of artistic imagination. However, this Italian mutual ideology and treatment of artists was not echoed in Toledo, Spain.

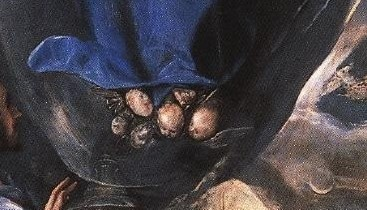
El Greco, (a detail of) The Virgin of Immaculate Conception and Saint John (c. 1585), oil on canvas, 237 x 118 cm, Museo de Santa Cruz, Toledo

In hopes of becoming a reputed and well-represented artist in Spain, El Greco aimed to be recognised by King Phillip II. Royal patronage would have ensured a secure transition to Spain, and could possibly have helped him to move to a metropolis like Madrid. However, following a string of legal disputes over what El Greco deemed inadequate pay for his work, the Cretan master failed to achieve King Phillip's approval.

Consequently, El Greco remained in Toledo for the rest of his life, where he was well-received by his contemporaries. One such contemporary was the Spanish preacher and poet Hortensio Félix Paravicino, who remarked that, "Crete gave him life and the painter's craft, Toledo a better homeland, where through Death he began to achieve eternal life." Besides the appreciation shown towards El Greco by his contemporaries, he also found success in his artistic career; between the years of 1581 and 1585. As such, the demand for devotional works by El Greco's patrons escalated rapidly. His customers were able to choose from a few samples, often smaller versions of his works, which he would then alter to suit their preferences.

El Greco later became the master of a workshop which dealt with the creation of architectural or framing devices for cathedrals. These years of 1597–1607 were a profitable decade for him and his workshop, yielding several commissions and outputs. Despite staying in Toledo, this granted El Greco significant projects which would elevate his artistic career and reputation to meet his ambitions.

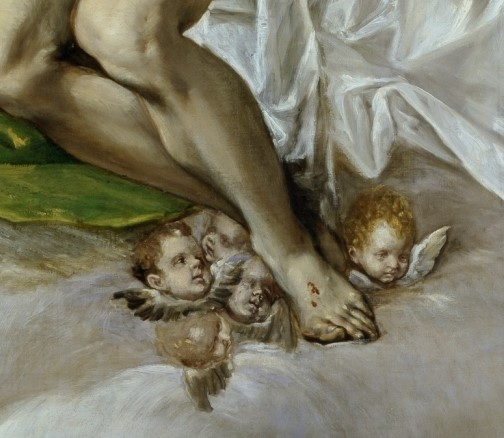
El Greco, (a detail of) The Holy Trinity (1577–1579), oil on canvas, 300 x 179 cm, Museo del Prado, Madrid, Spain

== Analysis ==
The work is noticeably painted with the artist's intent for the viewer's gaze to concentrate on the Virgin. Painted for the high altar of the Chapel of Oballe, San Vicente, Toledo, it was the schematic centerpiece and was accompanied by the Visitation. Two other probable companions are the renditions of Saint Peter and Saint Ildefonso. As in the earlier version, El Greco includes several elements attributed to the Virgin Mary: such as flowers like roses and lilies, a fountain of clear water, and an enclosed garden. Here we see an added view of Toledo on the bottom left of the painting. For an atmosphere of divinity, El Greco has depicted the supernatural simultaneous glowing of the sun and the moon. When comparing the two paintings to one another, the time gap in their production is visible in how El Greco's stylistic preferences become exaggerated. Towards the later years of his career, his style progresses into one that overlooks proportion, scale, atmospheric perspective, realistic anatomy, and color blending. His figures become radically elongated and possess an ethereal, ghostly skin tone. These details act in contrast to the lifelike floral still life they are set against to communicate the metamorphosis from the earthly and the divine.

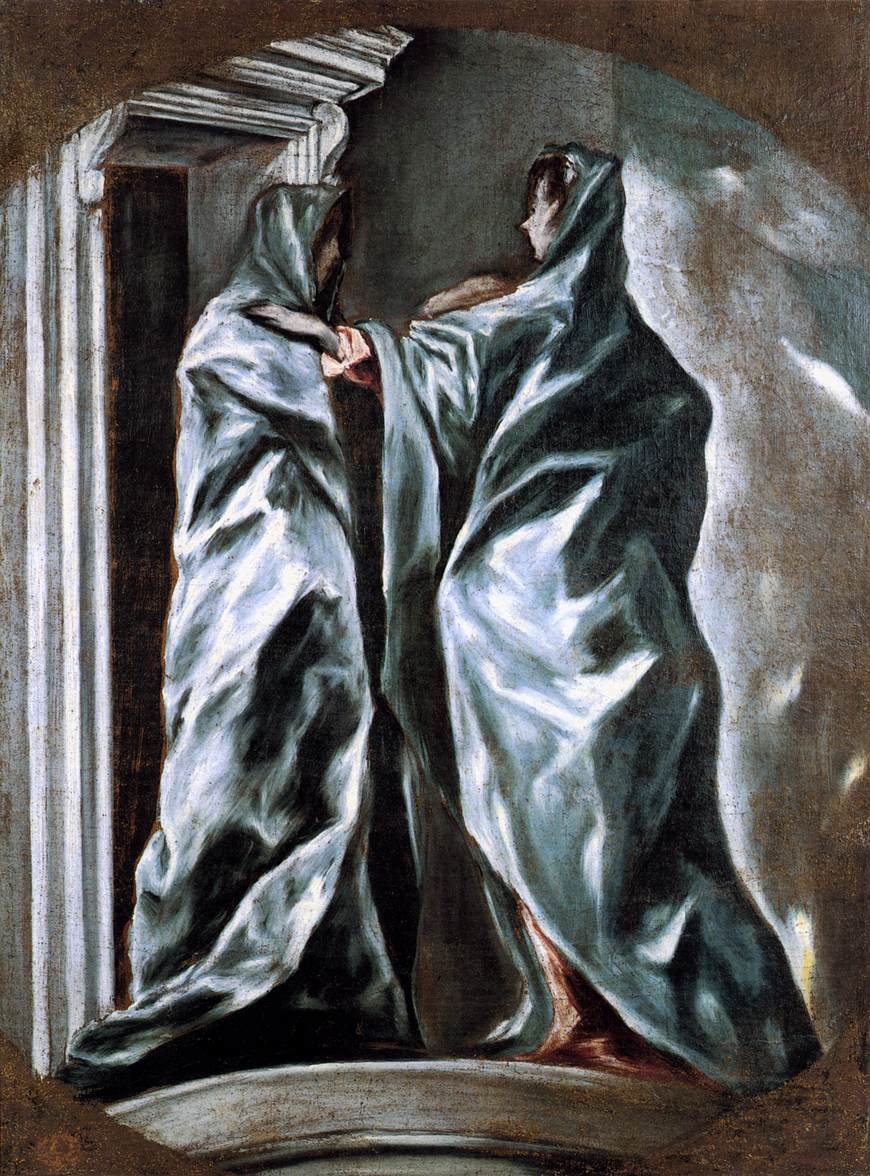
El Greco, The Visitation, (1610–13), oil on canvas, 96 x 72.4 cm, Dumbarton Oaks, Washington

== Technique and influence ==
In accordance to his training in Venice, as well as his preference that opposed Northern Italy's focus on design over color, El Greco held the belief that the color used in a composition is superior to its form. The works of his later years contain figural depictions that are more theatrical than descriptive in their forms. Without being melodramatic, El Greco manages to convey pathos in his ecclesial renderings. His tendency to stretch out his figures is amplified in his altarpiece works. In his completion of The Virgin of the Immaculate Conception, El Greco had requested that the altarpiece be lengthened so as to not compromise the length of the Virgin's figure.

Despite the criticism El Greco faced during the span of his artistic career, especially in his later years, his works found admirers and inspired the innovations of artists from the 19th century onward. Beginning with artists such as Eugène Delacroix and Édouard Manet, who were drawn to his use of color and expression, the creative correspondence continued into the 20th century. His muddling of space and the forms which occupy it became a pictorial device later employed by modern artists such as Paul Cézanne and Pablo Picasso. This led to El Greco being credited as the forefather of Expressionism and Cubism. The symbolists were influenced by the reserved figural expression the old master portrayed in his pictures, referencing them for their own works. Rainer Maria Rilke and Nikos Kazantzakis, literary artists, were bemused to write by the mystical character rumored (by scholars) as one having been possessed by El Greco in addition to the artworks he produced.. A collection of poetic works by Rilke, (Himmelfahrt Mariae I.II., 1913), were written after the poet had viewed The Virgin of the Immaculate Conception. Contemporary artists as well, such as Kysa Johnson, in her specific use of The Virgin of the Immaculate Conception as a basis for her works, have been influenced by the 16th-and-early-17th-century artist.

== See also ==
- List of works by El Greco
