= Saint Ildefonsus (El Greco, Illescas) =

Painting by El Greco

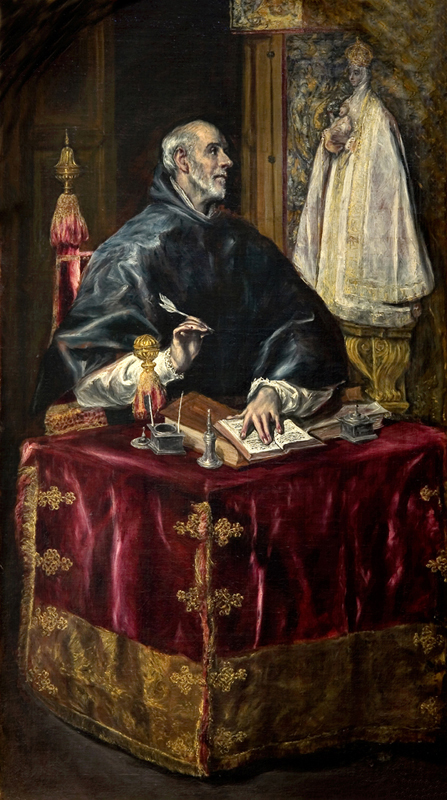
- Year: 1597-1603
- Medium: oil on canvas
- Dimensions: 112 cm × 64 cm (44 in × 25 in)
- Location: Santuario de Nuestra Señora de la Caridad, Illescas

Saint Ildefonsus is a 1597-1603 painting by El Greco, painted for the Santuario de Nuestra Señora de la Caridad in Illescas, Toledo, where it still hangs. It shows saint Ildefonsus, bishop of Toledo writing in his oratory in Toledo Cathedral, possibly one of his treatises in defence of Mary's virginity. He looks to his left for inspiration from a statue of the Virgin Mary that he had in his oratory, probably the Virgin of Charity of Illescas.

The painting was on show at Museo del Prado in 2020/2021.

== See also ==
- Saint Ildefonsus (El Greco, El Escorial)
