= Eugenius I of Toledo =

Roman Catholic archbishop

Eugenius I (sometimes Eugene; died 647) was Archbishop of Toledo from 636 to 646. He is also known as an astronomer and astronomical mathematician.

== Biography ==
Eugenius was a disciple of Helladius in the monastery of Agali. In 636, he succeeded Justus, another disciple of Helladius, as archbishop of Toledo.

At this period, under the Visigothic Kingdom, the councils of Toledo were national diets convoked by the monarch, attended by lay lords; they regulated, to some extent, not only spiritual but temporal affairs.

Of these councils Eugenius presided at the Fifth Council of Toledo, convoked in 636 by King Chintila to confirm his elevation to the throne; he assisted at the sixth, convoked by the same king to take precautions against the disorders of royal elections.

This council, contrary to the principles later put in practice by Ildephonsus, banished all Jews who did not embrace Catholicism.

Eugenius attended the Seventh Council of Toledo, which was summoned by King Chindaswinth and decreed that the bishops of Toledo should reside one month every year in that city.
