= Saint Ildefonsus (El Greco, El Escorial) =

1609 painting by El Greco

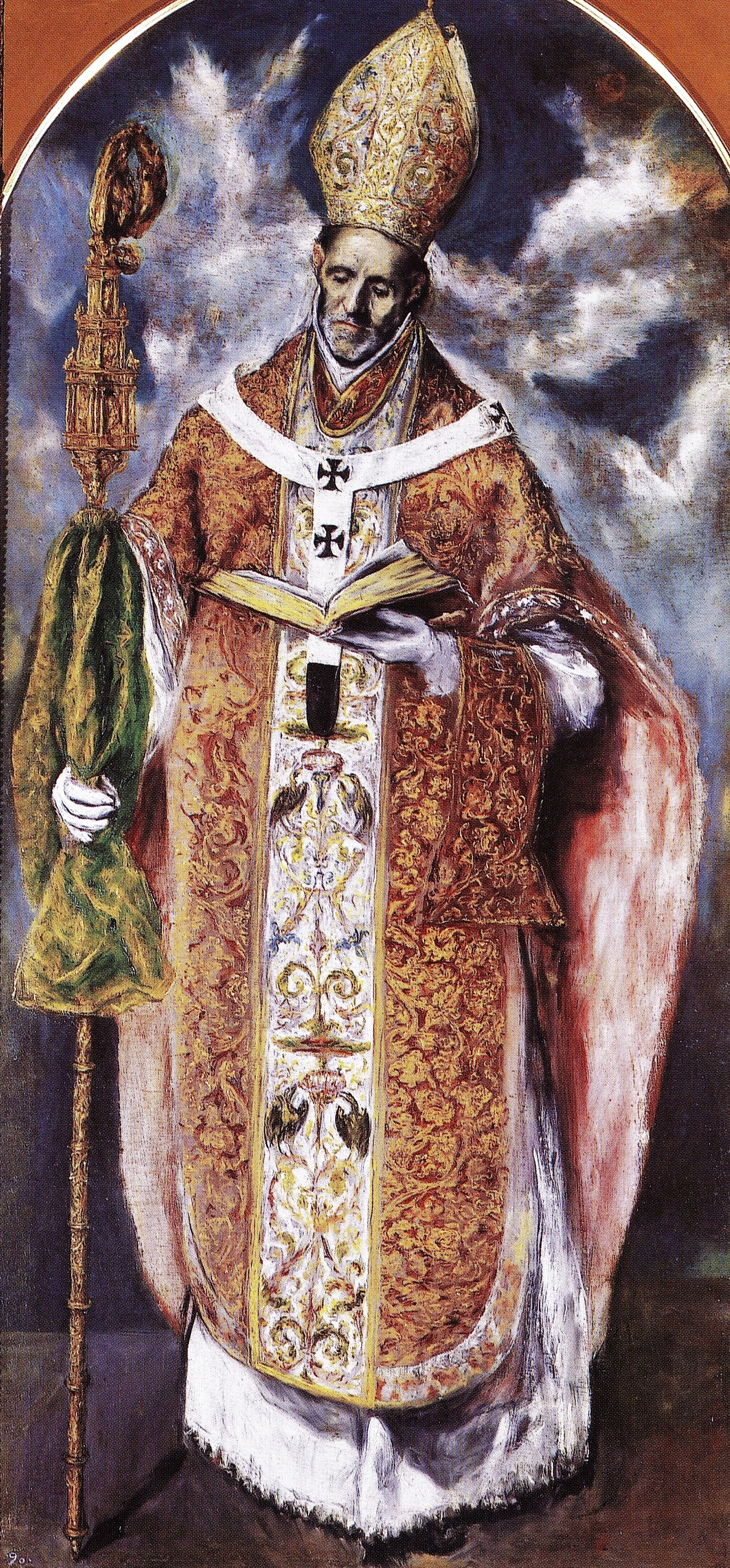
- Artist: El Greco
- Year: 1609
- Medium: oil on canvas
- Dimensions: 222 cm × 105 cm (87 in × 41 in)
- Location: Monasterio de El Escorial, Madrid

Saint Ildefonsus is a 1609 painting by El Greco. It and his Saint Peter were both painted for the Church of San Vicente, Toledo. It has also previously been misidentified as Pope Eugene I or saint Blaise. It is now in the Real Monasterio de San Lorenzo de El Escorial.

Ildefonsus is shown in a chasuble, pallium and mitre, holding a bishop's staff and an open book. The full robes emphasise the model's anatomy, showing Michelangelo's influence on El Greco.

== See also ==
- List of works by El Greco

== Bibliography ==
- (in Spanish) ÁLVAREZ LOPERA, José, El Greco, Madrid, Arlanza, 2005, Biblioteca «Descubrir el Arte», (colección «Grandes maestros»). ISBN 84-9550-344-1.
- (in Spanish) SCHOLZ-HÄNSEL, Michael, El Greco, Colonia, Taschen, 2003. ISBN 978-3-8228-3173-1.
