= Church of Santa Leocadia, Toledo =

Church in Toledo, Spain

Coordinates: 39°51′34.76″N 4°1′42.01″W

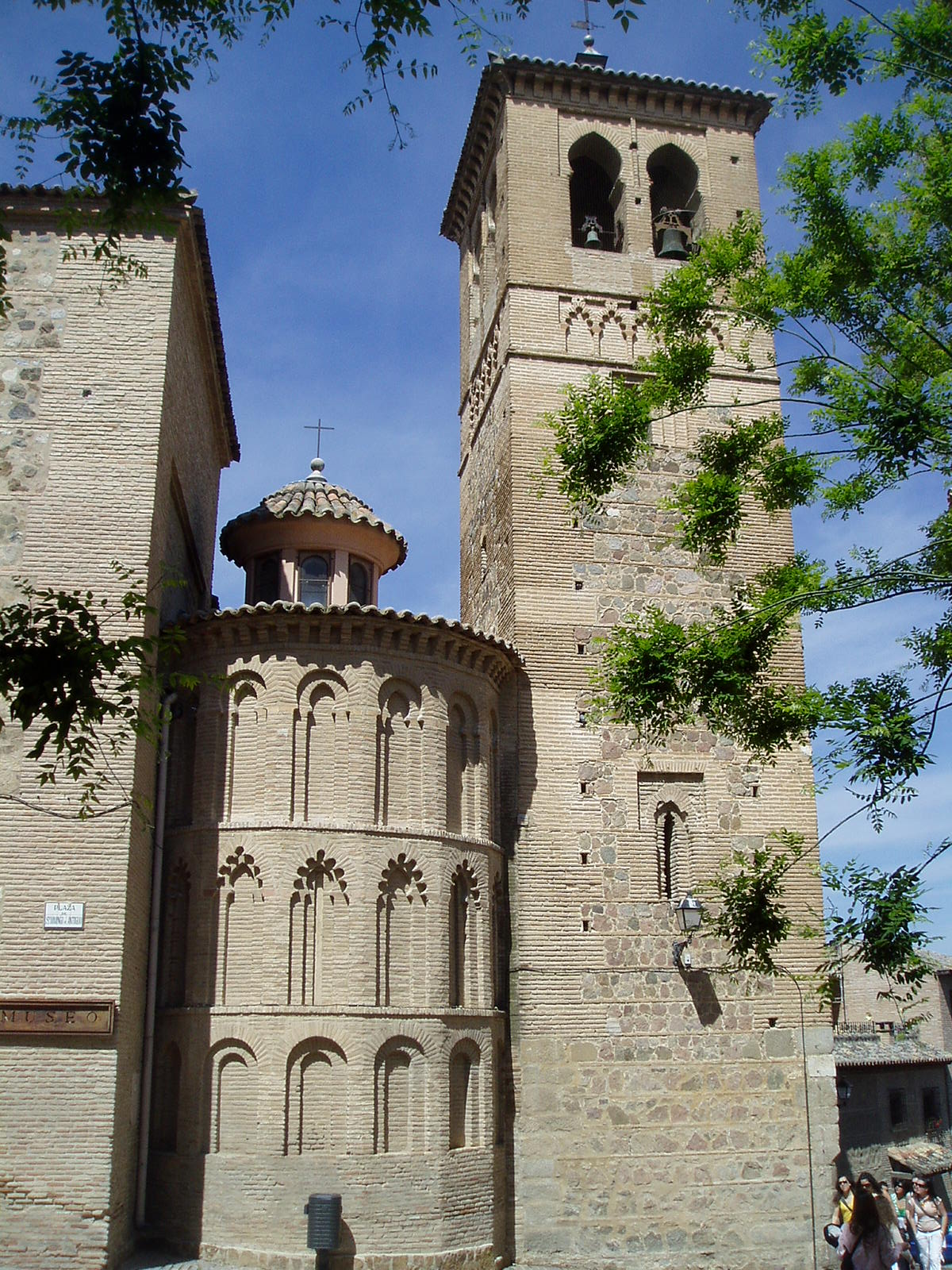
Tower and apse of the church

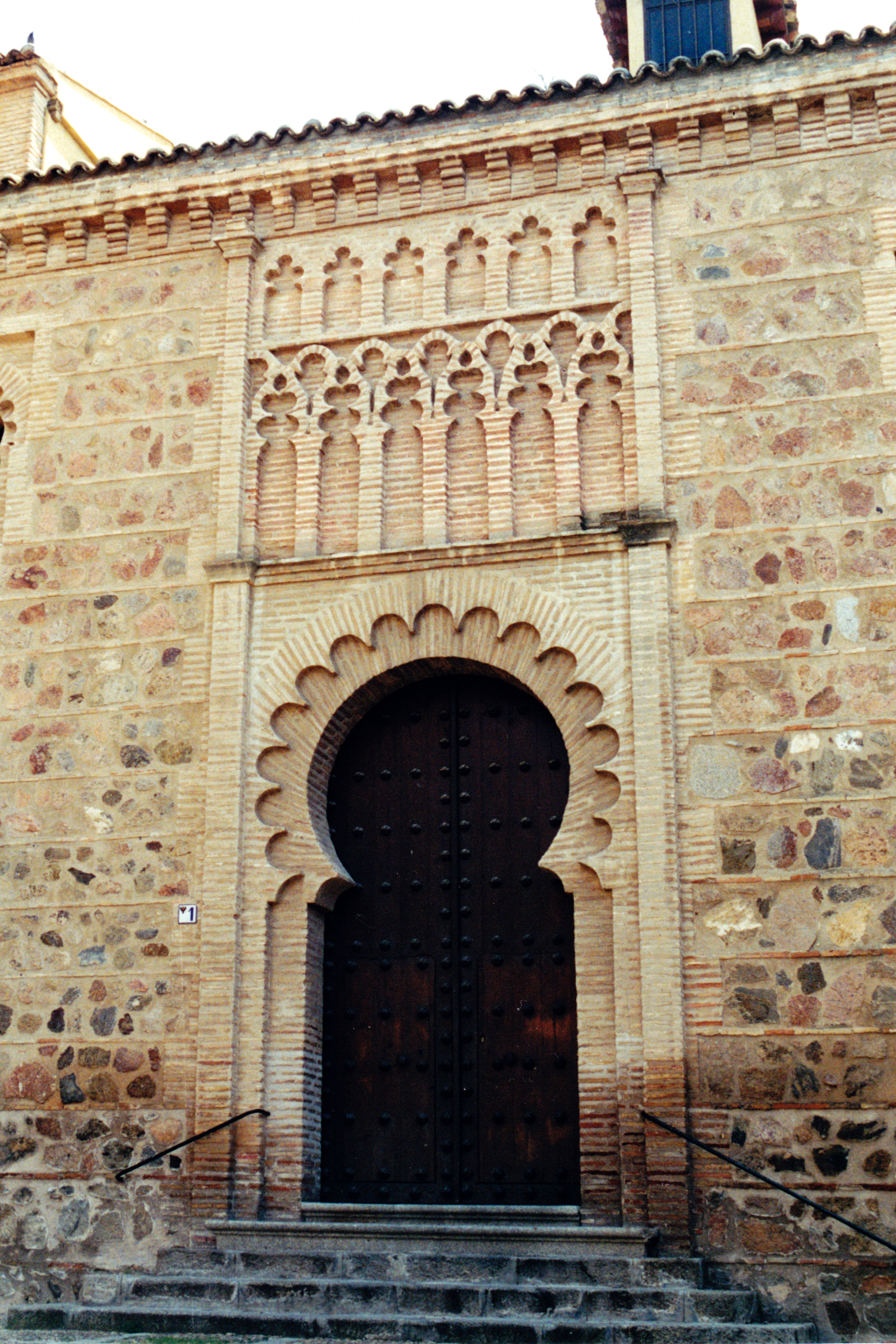
Portal

The Church of St Leocadia (Spanish: Iglesia de Santa Leocadia) is a medieval church located in Toledo, in Castile-La Mancha, Spain.

== History ==
Toledan tradition maintains that this church was built on the site of the house where Saint Leocadia of Toledo was born. This house supposedly had a small underground room, where it is affirmed that she prayed. This cave corresponds to the crypt located next to the right pillar of the presbytery and is covered with a plaster rib vault, which can be dated to the first half of the 16th century.

Both the present church and the tower are in the Toledan variant of the Mudéjar style and are datable, in their older parts, to the end of the 13th century. However, there is reason to assume that there existed an earlier building. The parish of "Santa Leocadia within Toledo" (see note^{1}) is mentioned in documents from the middle of the 12th century. In the tower and on the façade of the church are preserved, embedded, some fragments of reliefs in Visigothic style. There are only references to think that the primitive arrangement was that of an isolated building, separated from the Monastery of Santo Domingo el Antiguo by a street that was suppressed, in times of Alfonso X of Castile, when extending that convent.

== Notes ==
1. The denomination "within Toledo" differentiates it from another church, with the same name, "next to the alcázar", built in the place where the saint was in prison, and the basilica outside the city walls, known as Cristo de la Vega, where she was buried.
