= Parma Ildefonsus =

A sampling of pages

The Parma Ildefonsus is an illuminated manuscript produced at the Abbey of Cluny around 1100. It is codex MS 1650 in the Biblioteca Palatina, Parma.

The Parma Ildefonsus contains of 114 parchment leaves, three of them blank and unnumbered, measuring 23 by 16 centimetres (9.1 in × 6.3 in). There are 19 lines of text on a page of full text. The content of every page is within a decorative frame. The main script is Caroline minuscule with rubrics and captions in Roman square capitals and rustic capitals. The main scribe was probably also responsible for copying the annals at the start of Cluny's cartulary A (Paris, Bibliothèque Nationale, NAL 1087), while the rubricator was himself the main scribe of Paris, Bibliothèque Nationale, lat. 1087.

There are four Latin texts copied in the Parma Ildefonsus. The main text is De virginitate Beatae Mariae by Ildefonsus. It is preceded by a short biography of Ildefonsus by Julian of Toledo and is followed by what was originally a preface, written by Gómez de Albelda. The final text is another short biography of Ildefonsus, misattributed to Elladius but actually written by Cixila.

The texts are illustrated by 35 miniatures (9 full-page, 13 half-page, 3 third-page and 10 small portrait busts). The programme of illustration is original and was designed for this codex. Two illustrators worked on it, the more prolific one, responsible for 33 of the miniatures, is the same the artist who decorated Paris, Bibliothèque nationale, Latin 1087. There are nine decorated initials, including one historiated. The incipits of the divisions of the text following the initials are in gold with a purple background.

Of the 35 miniatures, 22 are of the patriarchs and prophets of the Old Testament mentioned by Ildefonsus. In nine of these, they are depicted addressing the Israelites. There are ten illustrations of Ildefonsus, all showing him as a monk. Five of them depict him debating his opponents, two praying to Christ and one each celebrating Mass, writing at his desk and kneeling before the Virgin (the only depiction of her in the codex). Two images depict Gómez de Albelda writing his preface and giving a copy to Bishop Godescalc of Le Puy. Finally, there is a portrait of Julian of Toledo. In the images, there is a strong emphasis on talking, debating and writing, activities of particular interest to its monastic creators. By depicting Ildefonsus in the same situation as the patriarchs and prophets—debating his opponents—the illustrator enhances the authority of Ildefonsus's text.

The Madrid Ildefonsus, made around 1200, is a copy of the Parma Ildefonsus.

A full-colour facsimile edition with commentary in Italian was published by Il Bulino Edizioni d'arte of Modena in 2010.

== Bibliography ==
- Henriet, Patrick (2007). "Le moine, le roi, l'évêque: À propos du Parma Ildefonsus (Biblioteca Palatina de Parma, ms 1650)". e-Spania. 3.
- Schapiro, Meyer (1964). The Parma Ildefonsus: A Romanesque Illuminated Manuscript From Cluny and Related Works. College Art Association of America.
- Raizman, David Seth (1987). "A Rediscovered Illuminated Manuscript of St. Ildefonsus's De Virginitate Beatae Mariae in the Biblioteca Nacional in Madrid". Gesta. 26 (1): 37–46. JSTOR 767078.
