= San Bartolomé =

San Bartolomé may refer to:

== Guatemala ==
- San Bartolomé Jocotenango, a municipality in El Quiché department
- San Bartolomé Milpas Altas, a municipality in Sacatepéquez department

== Mexico ==
In Oaxaca State:

- San Bartolomé Ayautla
- San Bartolomé Loxicha
- San Bartolomé Quialana
- San Bartolomé Yucuañe
- San Bartolomé Zoogocho

== Philippines ==
- San Bartolome, a barangay of Novaliches, Quezon City

== Spain ==
- San Bartolomé (Belmonte), a civil parish in Belmonte de Miranda, Asturias
- San Bartolomé, Las Palmas, on the island of Lanzarote in the Canary Islands
- San Bartolomé de Tirajana, on the island of Gran Canaria in the Canary Islands

== See also ==
- Church of San Bartolomé (disambiguation)
