= Quiricus (bishop of Barcelona) =

Quiricus (Catalan: Quirze), a churchman and well-connected man of letters, was the bishop of Barcelona from 648 until about 667 during the Visigothic period.

Quiricus wrote a hymn in honour of Saint Eulalia. The hymn Barchinon laete Cucufate vernans, in honour of Saint Cucuphas (Cugat), was probably also composed by him. At Quiricus' request, Taio, Bishop of Zaragoza, began compiling an anthology of extracts from the work of Gregory the Great in 653. In 654, progress on the compilation was slowed by the revolt of Froia and the invasion of the Basques. Archbishop Ildefonsus of Toledo dedicated his treatise on the perpetual virginity of Mary (De perpetua virginitate) to Quiricus.

Quiricus of Barcelona may be identical to the Quiricus of Toledo who appears as bishop there from about 670 until his death in 680.

== See also ==
- Catholic Church in Spain

== Sources ==
- Anglès, Higini. "Hispanic Musical Culture from the 6th to the 14th Century." The Musical Quarterly, Vol. 26, No. 4. (Oct., 1940), pp. 494–528.
- Collins, Roger. Visigothic Spain, 409–711. Oxford: Blackwell Publishing, 2004. ISBN 0-631-18185-7.
- Thompson, E. A. The Goths in Spain. Oxford: Clarendon Press, 1969.
