= Sancha García =

Sancha García was abbess of the royal monastery Abbey of Santa María la Real de Las Huelgas from 1207 to 1229/30.

The monastery had from the 13th century two authorities, the abbess for religious matters, and a female member of the royal family to administrate secular matters, especially regarding the relations between the monastery and the court and other donors. Sancha García was the second abbess, succeeding Dona Misol. She has been described as "one of the last truly powerful abbesses in Medieval Europe", who was the head of the convent and several monasteries, and who performed functions reserved for priests, such as hearing confession.

During her abbacy, Las Huelgas received the richly illuminated manuscript now known as the Las Huelgas Beatus and she may even have been the anonymous donor.
