= Church of San Bartolomé =

Church of San Bartolomé may refer to several churches in Spain:

- Church of San Bartolomé (Campisábalos)
- Church of San Bartolomé (Logroño)
- Church of San Bartolomé (Tarazona de la Mancha)
- Church of San Bartolomé (Toledo)
