= Visitation (El Greco) =

Painting by El Greco

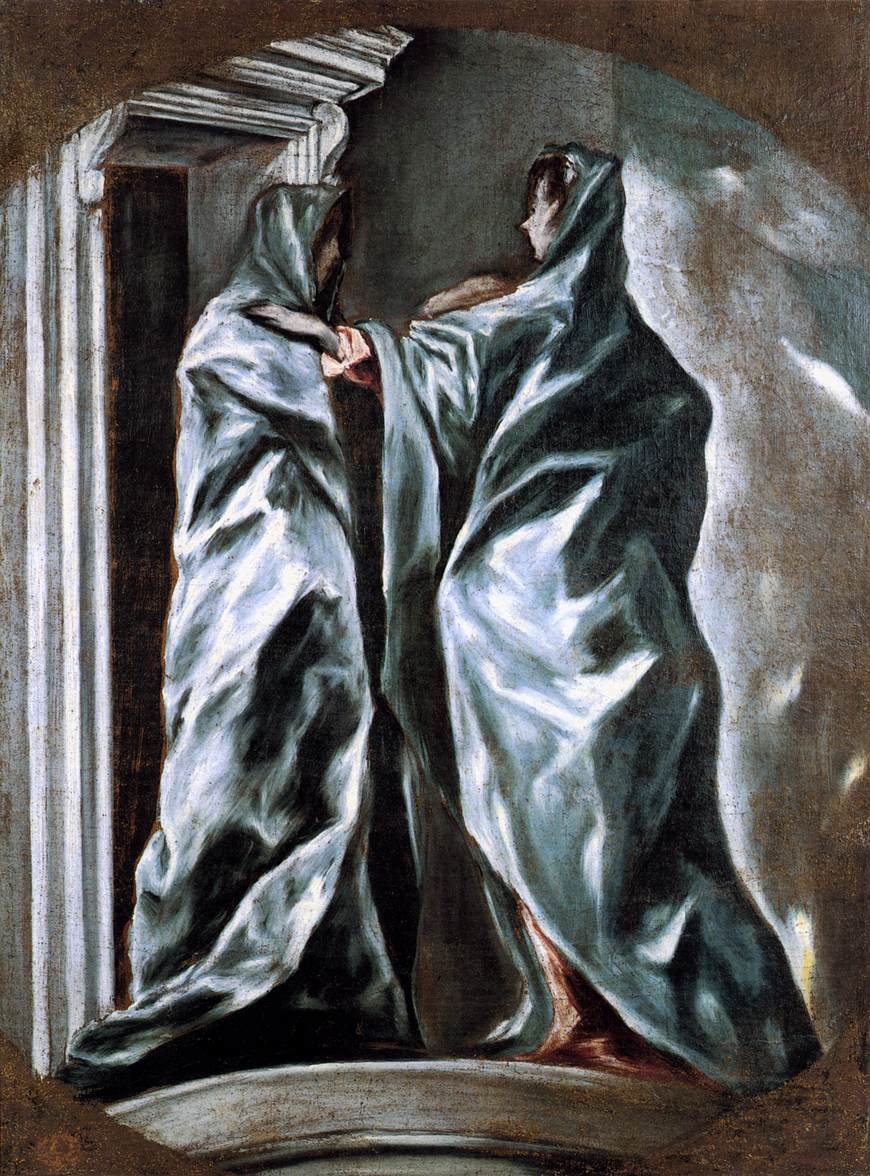
- Artist: El Greco
- Year: 1609–1613
- Medium: oil on canvas
- Dimensions: 98 cm × 72 cm (39 in × 28 in)
- Location: Dumbarton Oaks

Visitation is a 1609–1613 painting of the Visitation by El Greco, now in Dumbarton Oaks in Washington, D.C.

It was commissioned by Isabel de Oballe for the chapel of Santa Isabel in the church of San Vicente in Toledo, Spain. She requested that he produce "an account of the visitation of Saint Elizabeth for the name of the founder, on a circular canvas in a decorated frame as in Illescas".

== Bibliography (in Spanish) ==
- https://web.archive.org/web/20100918075603/http://www.artehistoria.jcyl.es/genios/cuadros/1736.htm
- ÁLVAREZ LOPERA, José, El Greco, Madrid, Arlanza, 2005, Biblioteca «Descubrir el Arte», (colección «Grandes maestros»). ISBN 84-9550-344-1.
- SCHOLZ-HÄNSEL, Michael, El Greco, Colonia, Taschen, 2003. ISBN 978-3-8228-3173-1.
