= Taius =

Spanish bishop, theologian and philosopher (600–683)

Samuel Taius
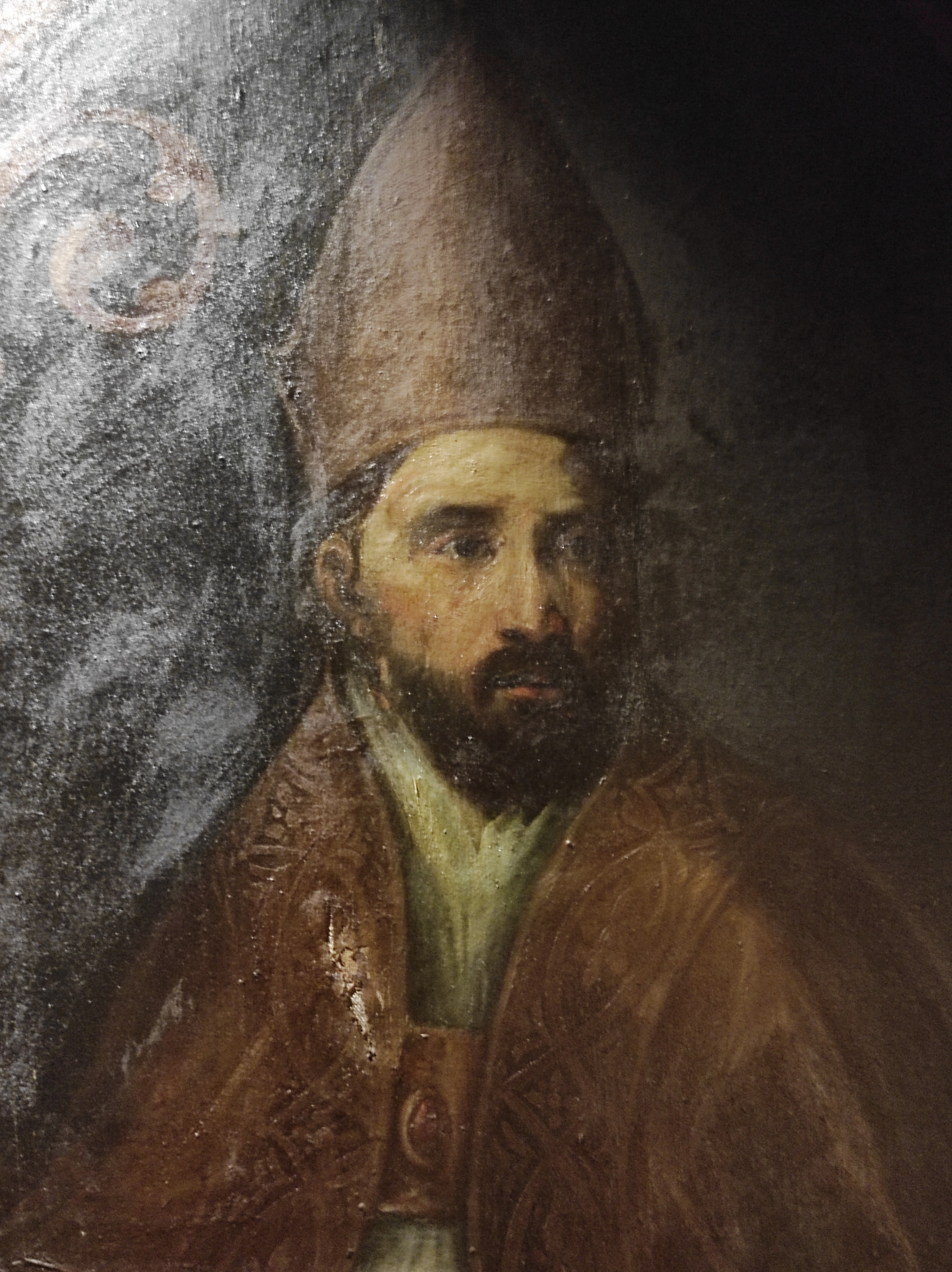
- Imaginary portrait attributed to Pablo Rabiella y Díez de Aux in 1693
- Born: 600
- Died: 683

Education
- Education: Abbey of Santa Engracia

Philosophical work
- Era: Medieval philosophy
- Region: Western philosophy
- School: Patristics
- Notable works: Sententiarum; De aenigmatibus Salomonis

Taius (Taio, Tago, Tajo, Tajón, Tayon) (c. 600—c. 683) was a theologian and bishop of Zaragoza during the Visigothic period, from 651 to 664, succeeding his teacher Saint Braulius. His surname was Samuel (Samuhel). Taius, like Braulius and Bishop Ildefonsus, was also a pupil of Saint Isidore of Seville.

== Biography ==
Little is known about his background, but in a letter to Bishop Quiricus of Barcelona, to whom he dedicated his principal work, Taius refers to himself as Samuel, a name some scholars interpreted as indicative of some Jewish ancestry, although it could also reflect the Visigothic custom of adopting Old Testament cognomina. Taius was ordained as a priest in 632, and later served as an abbot in the Real Monasterio de Santa Engracia where he also educated.

He participated in the Eighth Council of Toledo, the Ninth Council of Toledo and the Tenth Council of Toledo.

== Work ==
At the request of Quiricus of Barcelona, Taius compiled a collection of extracts from the work of Gregory the Great in 653–654. In 654 progress on the compilation was slowed by the revolt of Froia and the invasion of the Basques. He later traveled to Rome, where he was sent to procure the third part of Gregory's Moralia, then missing in Spain. He received this work from Pope Martin I.

During Froia's siege, Taius had been working on a revision of the Lex Visigothorum and was unable to leave the city. He composed his major work, during a time of turmoil for Zaragoza, as he himself reports: the city suffered. The result was the book Sententiarum, a systematic compilation that synthesized patristic teachings—especially from Gregory the Great and Augustine—while expanding and improving upon Isidore of Seville’s three‑book model. Its five‑book structure offered greater thematic breadth and a more rational, pedagogical organization, making it possibly the first Western theological summa. The work has been regarded by some as a “poorly organized”, but in the opinion of the Italian historian and priest Carlo Denina the work of Taius is of utmost relevance in Western theological thought. In Denina’s own words: “But what is important to know is that before these great masters of scholastic theology had appeared, a Spaniard, the bishop of Zaragoza named Taius, had provided the first model of a body of theology...”

He is also credited with De aenigmatibus Salomonis, which has traditionally been known as the work of Iustus of Toledo.

== Sources ==
- Ayala, J. M. (1997). Escritores eclesiásticos del siglo VII: Braulio y Tajón de Zaragoza. Revista Española de Filosofía Medieval, (4), 87–98.
- Denina, Carlo. Réponse à la question : «Que doit‐on à l’Espagne ?. Berlin, 1786.
- Collins, Roger. Visigothic Spain, 409–711. Oxford: Blackwell Publishing, 2004. ISBN 0-631-18185-7.
- García Villada, Z. “Fragmentos inéditos de Tajón.” RABM 30 (1914), 23–31.
- Madoz, J. “Tajón de Zaragoza y su viaje a Roma.” Mélanges Joseph de Ghellink 1:345–60.
- Palacios Martín, A. “Tajón de Zaragoza y la ‘Explicatio in Cantica Canticorum.’” AEF 3 (1980) 115–27.
- Robles, L. “Tajón de Zaragoza, continuador de Isidoro.” Saitabi 21 (1971), 19–25.
- Serratosa, R. “Osio de Córdoba. Tajón de Zaragoza.” Estudios 19 (1951), 85–95.
- Vega, A. C. “Tajón de Zaragoza. Una obra inédita.” CD 155 (1943) 145–77.
