= San Martín de Albelda =

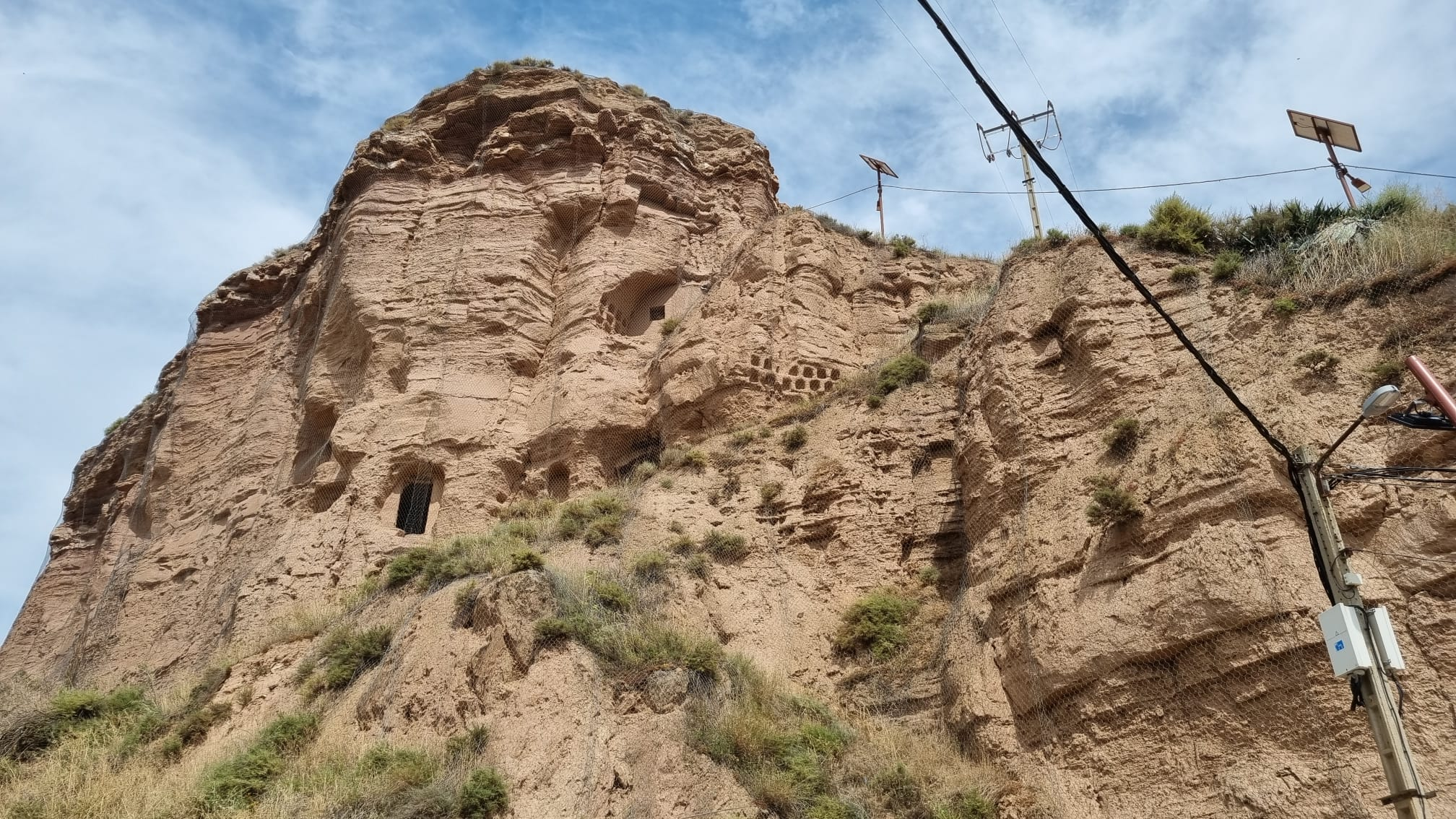
Ruins of the Monastery by year 2021

San Martín de Albelda was a Riojan monastery, whose ruins now lie within the municipal boundaries of Albelda de Iregua. It was an important and advanced cultural centre in Spain and western Europe during the tenth century.

The monastery was founded on 5 January 924 by Sancho Garcés I and Toda Aznárez, monarchs of Navarre, in gratitude for the recent reconquest of Nájera and Viguera (923) in conjunction with Ordoño II of León. The community was founded 'secundum Benedicti regulam uel id quod a sanctis patribus didicisti, that is, according to the Benedictine rule. It took its name—monasterium Albaidense or Albaildense—from the Muslim fortress of al-Bayadh (the White), on the site of which it was founded. Its first abbot was named Peter, but on 5 January 925, in a royal privilege granted on the anniversary of its founding, the abbot was Gabellus, suggesting that the monastery had perhaps been attacked during the invasion of Abd ar-Rahman III the previous year.

The house prospered under the repoblación, as it lay on trade routes connecting Álava, Castile, and Navarre north of the Ebro. In 950 Albelda had two hundred monks when the French bishop Godescalcus, making the first Jacobean pilgrimage known to history, stopped at the monastery in order that his amanuenses could copy the De uirginitate beatae Mariae of Ildephonsus of Toledo. By that time it also possessed one daughter house: San Prudencio de Laturce. In 976 the abbey's scriptorium compiled and illustrated the Codex Albeldensis, a parchment manuscript of 430 folios. It contains the first visual representations of Spanish monarchs (images of Sancho Garcés II, Ramiro Garcés, and Urraca Fernández), illustrated within those monarchs' lifetimes, and also the first record of Arabic numerals in western Europe (the numbers 1–9, but not 0, are represented). Besides the Godescalcus' copy of Idelphonsus and the Codex Albeldensis there was the Liber Ordinum of the Mozarabic rite, copied at San Pedro in 1052.

Contemporary depictions (and self-depiction) of three monks of Albelda, the scribes of the Codex Albeldensis, from left to right: Serracino, Vigila, and García (as drawn by Vigila)

Under the powerful Navarrese monarch Sancho Garcés III, the abbey received the castle of Clavijo and Albelda was made a diocese. The bishops of Albelda made their seat in San Martín between 1033 and 1092. The monastery declined after that. Between 1167 and 1180 it was converted to a collegiate church under the Rule of Saint Augustine. In 1435 it was united to the Concatedral de Santa María de la Redonda through a bull of Pope Eugene IV on the advice of Diego López de Zúñiga, Bishop of Calahorra, in whose diocese Albelda lay.

== See also ==
- Catholic Church in Spain
