= San Gerolamo Emiliani, Milan =

Church in Milan

Church of San Gerolamo Emiliani

Religion
- Affiliation: Roman Catholic
- Province: Milan
- Status: Active

Location
- Location: Milan, Italy
- Interactive map of Church of San Gerolamo Emiliani
- Coordinates: 45.50121°N 9.24534°E

Architecture
- Architect: Carlo De Carli (1910-1999)
- Type: Church
- Style: Modern

San Gerolamo Emiliani is a Modernist-style Roman Catholic church located on via Giovanni Calagria #36 in Milan, region of Lombardy, Italy.

== History ==
Milan planned in the 1950s to erect 22 new churches to celebrate upcoming church council (Second Vatican Council). The architect of this church, which serves the quarter of Cimiano, was Carlo De Carli, who also designed the church of Sant'Ildefonso. Construction proceeded until early 1960s.

== Description ==
The original plan was square, but evolved into an octagonal plans for the main nave and three protruding octagons in a square for the sanctuary, baptistery, and chapel. The building is made from white bricks and cement. The entrance portal is surmounted by a panel of glass bricks (blocks) forming vertical strips of different hues and color.
