= Julian of Toledo =

7th-century Spanish archbishop and saint

Saint Julian of Toledo
- Julian addressing his flock, from the Parma Ildefonsus (c. 1100)
- Born: 642; Toledo, Spain
- Died: 690; Toledo, Spain
- Venerated in: Eastern Orthodox Church; Roman Catholic Church
- Feast: March 8

Julian of Toledo (642–690) was born in Toledo, Hispania. He was well educated at the cathedral school, was a monk and later abbot at Agali, a spiritual student of Saint Eugene II, and archbishop of Toledo. He was the first bishop to have primacy over the entire Iberian Peninsula—a position he has been accused of securing by being complicit in 680 in the supposed poisoning of Wamba, king of the Visigoths—and he helped centralize the Iberian Church in Toledo. His elevation to the position of primate of the Visigothic church was a source of great unhappiness among the kingdom's clergy. And his views regarding the doctrine of the Trinity proved distressing to the Vatican.

He presided over several councils and synods and revised the Visigothic rite. A voluminous writer, his works include Prognostics, a volume on death (and by far his most influential work); a history of King Wamba's war with dux Paul in Septimania (a Sallustian work, and one of the few examples of historical writing from the late Visigothic kingdom); and a book on the future life (687). A lost work, apparently dedicated to King Erwig, dealt with the issue of Jews owning Christian slaves. He encouraged the Visigothic kings in Hispania to deal harshly with the Jews. For example, in presiding over the Twelfth Council of Toledo, he induced King Erwig to pass severe anti-Jewish laws. At Erwig's request, in 686, he wrote De Comprobatione Aetatis Sextae Contra Judaeos, a work dealing with messianic prophesies of the Bible in a way intended to convert the Jews.

He died at Toledo in 690 of natural causes. Julian's memorial is held March 8.

He is commemorated by way of a portrait in the cathedral of Toledo. JT's Cocktail Bar and Club in Oxford is named in his honour.

== Sources ==
- Collins, Roger. "Julian of Toledo and the Education of Kings in Late Seventh-Century Spain." Law, Culture and Regionalism in Early Medieval Spain. Variorum, 1992. pp. 1–22. ISBN 0-86078-308-1. Revised version of "Julian of Toledo and the Royal Succession in Late Seventh Century Spain," Early Medieval Kingship, edd. P. H. Sawyer and I. N. Wood. Leeds: School of History, University of Leeds, 1977.

== Critical editions and translations ==
Critical editions

- J.N. Hillgarth, B. Bischoff, W. Levison (eds.), Iulianus Toletanus. Opera, I. Prognosticon futuri saeculi libri tres. Apologeticum de tribus capitulis. De comprobatione sextae aetatis. Historia Wambae regis. Epistula ad Modoenum. (= Corpus Christianorum. Series Latina, 115), Turnhout: Brepols Publishers, 1976
- J.C. Martín-Iglesias, V. Yarza Urquiola (eds.), Iulianus Toletanus, Felix Toletanus, Iulianus Toletanus (Ps.). Opera, II. Elogium Ildefonsi, Vita Iuliani (auctore Felice Toletano), Antikeimena, Fragmenta, Ordo annorum mund (= Corpus Christianorum. Series Latina, 115A-B), Turnhout: Brepols Publishers, 2014

English translations

- Julian of Toledo. Prognosticum futuri saeculi: Foreknowledge of the World to Come, translated, edited and introduced by Sergio Stancati, OP, 2010 (ACW 63). ISBN 9780809105687
