= Convento de San Clemente, Toledo =

13th-century monastery of Cistercian nuns in Castile-La Mancha, Spain

Coordinates: 39.8581°N 4.0284°W

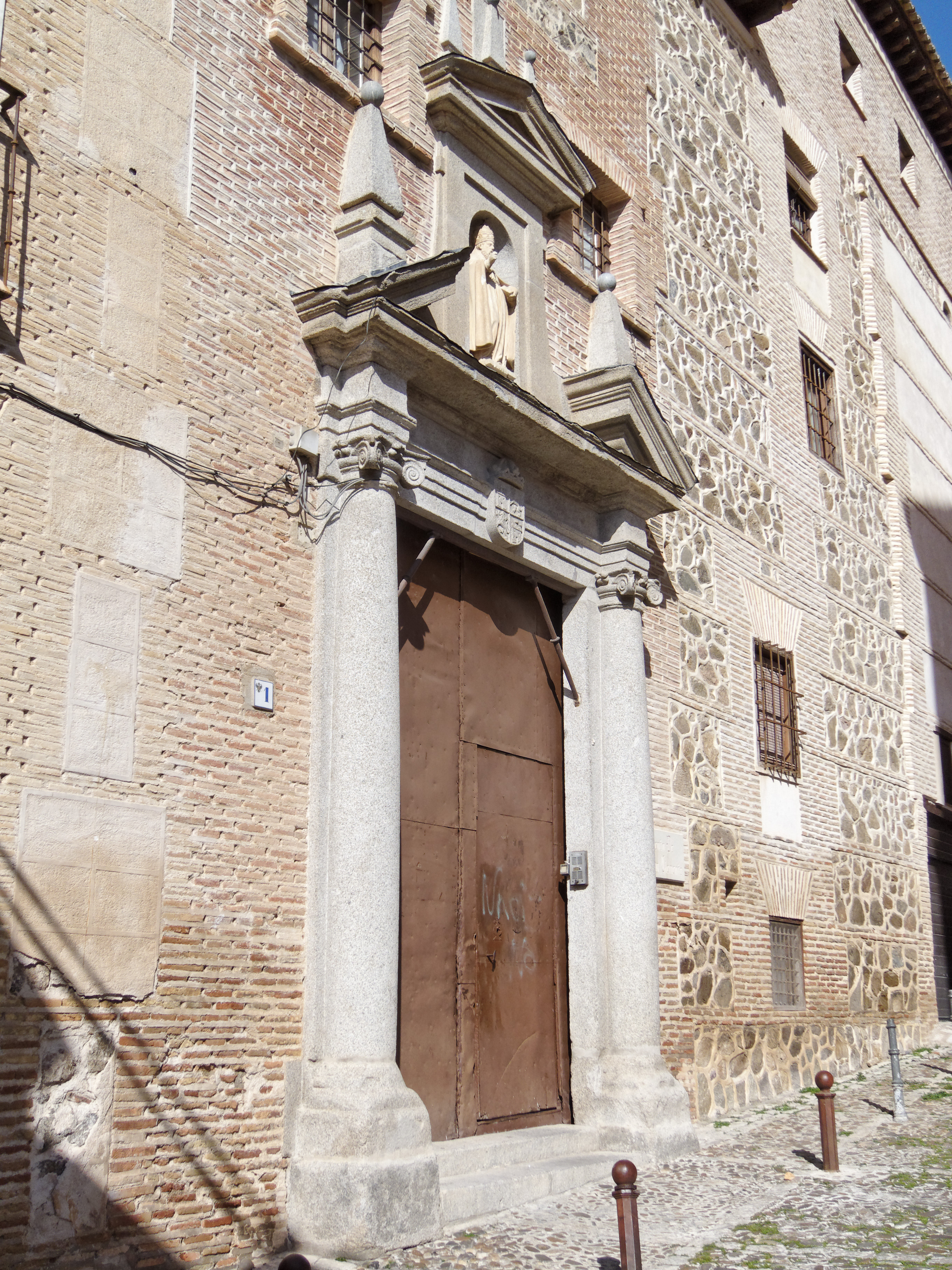
Portal of the monastery

The Royal Monastery of St. Clement (Spanish: Monasterio de San Clemente el Real) is a monastery of Cistercian nuns located in the city of Toledo, Spain. Noted for its Spanish Renaissance architecture, it was founded in the 13th century during the reign of King Alfonso X of Castile, known as "the Wise" (reigned 1252–1284). Inside the building there are a Roman cistern, Mudéjar architecture, remains of the Palacio de los Cervatos and many decorative elements.

It is a large building that contains a basement, a refectory, two cloisters, a chapter house, a church, a hallway, the nuns' choir, the portals, cisterns and other dependences.

It currently houses a museum dedicated to marzipan which, according to a historic study and tradition, originated in this monastery.
