= Ermita del Cristo de la Vega =

Hermitage in Spain

Coordinates: 39.8609°N 4.0343°W

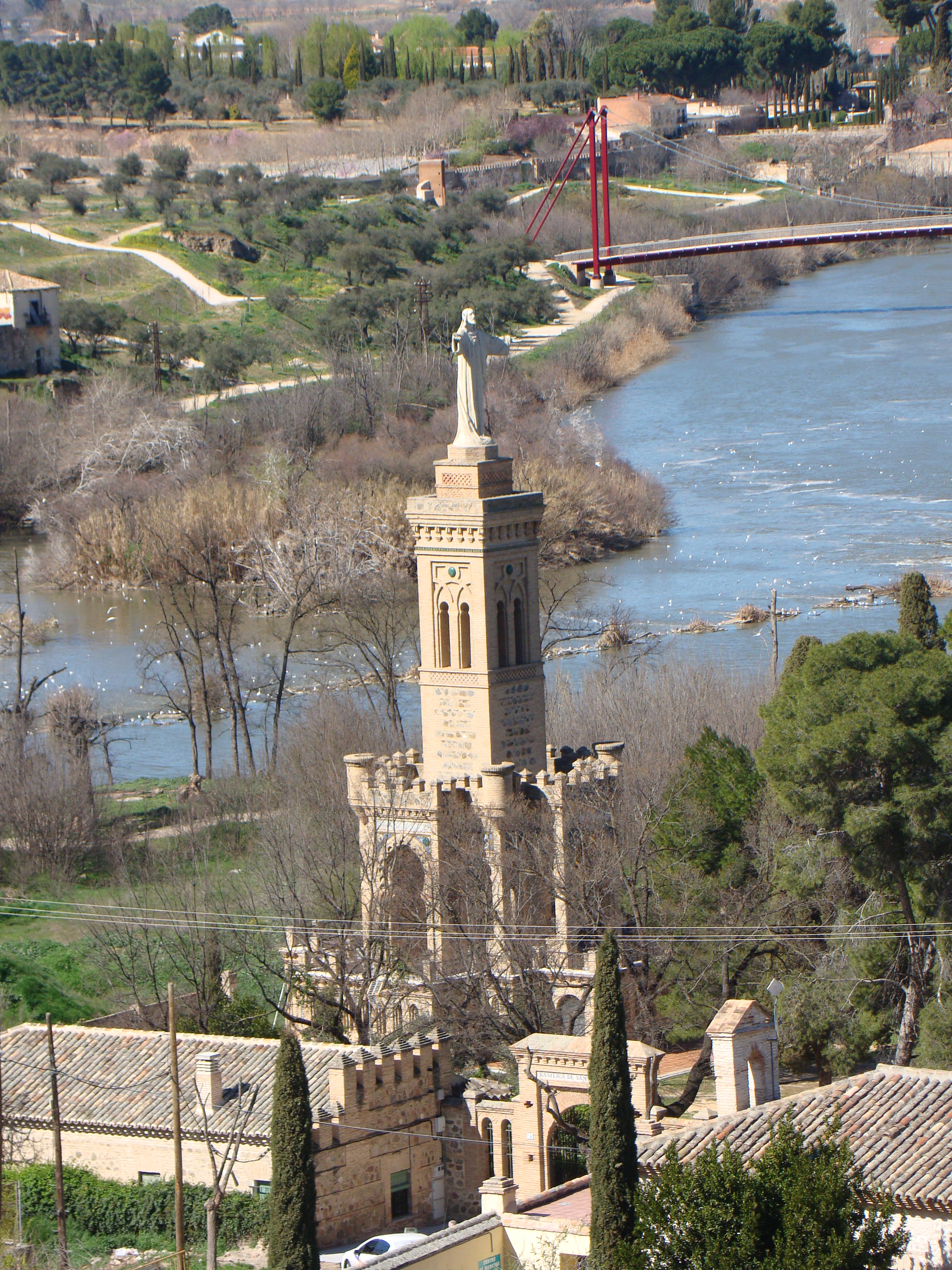
Ermita del Cristo de la Vega

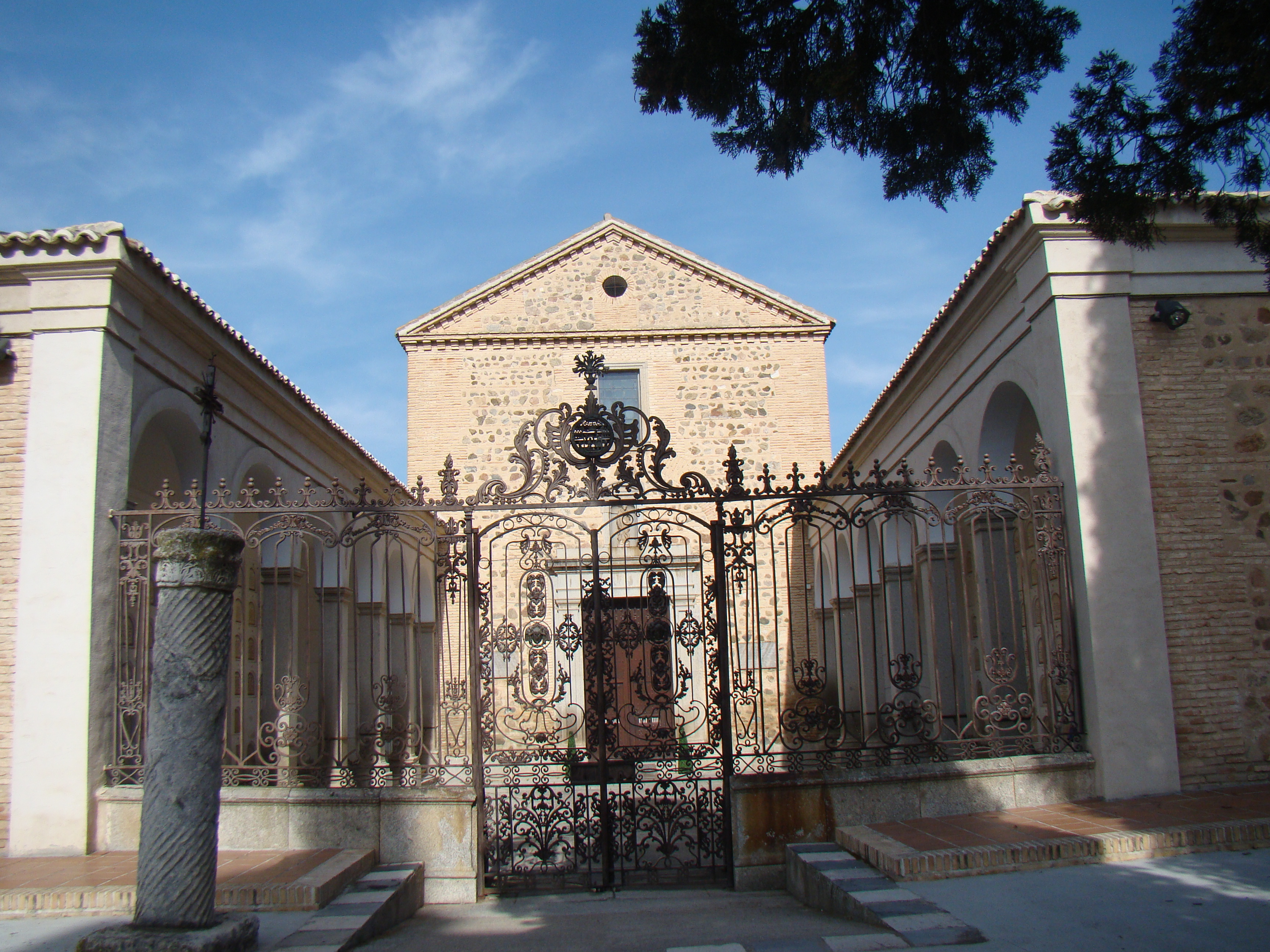
Ermita del Cristo de la Vega

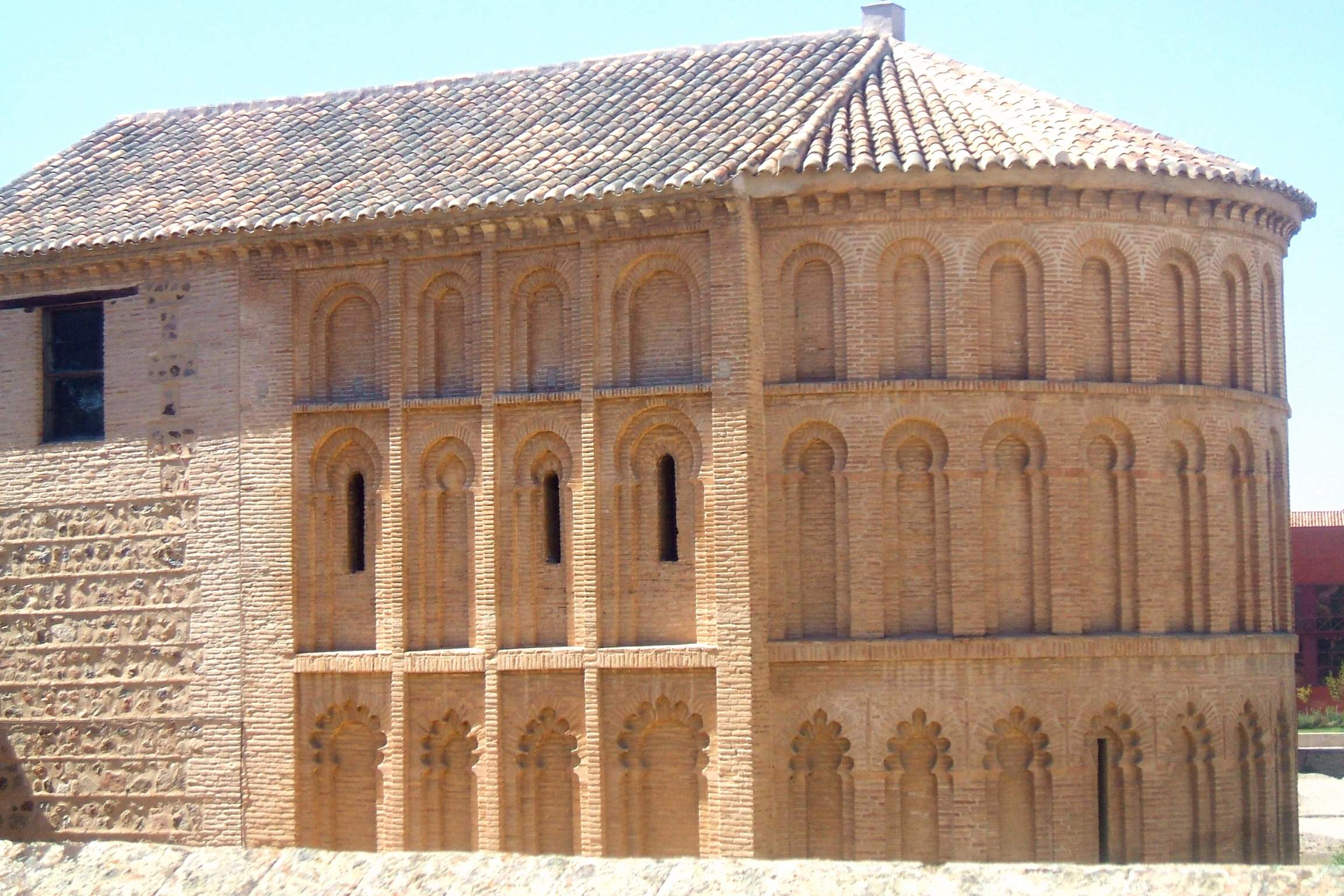
Apse

The Ermita del Cristo de la Vega is a hermitage located in Toledo, Castile-La Mancha, Spain. It was built on the remains of the Visigothic Basílica de Santa Leocadia during the 7th century.

Vega means plain, and the building is located in Vega Baja de Toledo, in the old cemetery area of the city. In the vicinity of the building were buried the remains of Saint Idelfonsus, Saint Leocadia and Saint Eugenius which were removed subsequently.

== History ==
During the Visigothic period in the interior, the "Councils of Toledo" were held. These were ecclesiastical assemblies of bishops who called regularly to legislate or deliberate on religious matters.

== Architecture ==
The mudejar apse is preserved, but the rest was destroyed in the Spanish War of Independence. Between 1816–1826, the building was rebuilt and a new image of the Christ added, dating from its present structure, and since then has been used as a hermitage under the invocation of the Cristo de la Vega.

== Design ==
The presbytery is watched over by a sculpture of Christ with one hand free of the crucifixion nails, hero of the famous legend recorded by Zorrilla as "A good judge, a better witness".
