= Froia =

Froia was a Visigothic nobleman, probably a count, who rebelled and tried to seize the kingship in 653, either in the final weeks of the reign of Chindasuinth or in the opening weeks of that of his son, Reccesuinth.

He had the support of the Basques in the upper Ebro valley, where he had a small circle of supporters. He besieged Zaragoza, where the bishop Taius was whiling away at a revision of the Lex Visigothorum, unable to leave the city. Reccesuinth led an army to put down the revolt in person and force the Basques back into the mountains.

== Sources ==
- Collins, Roger. Visigothic Spain, 409–711. Oxford: Blackwell Publishing, 2004. ISBN 0-631-18185-7.
- Castellanos, Santiago. "The Political Nature of Taxation in Visigothic Spain." Early Medieval Europe, 12:3 (October, 2003), pp. 201–28.
