= Helladius of Toledo =

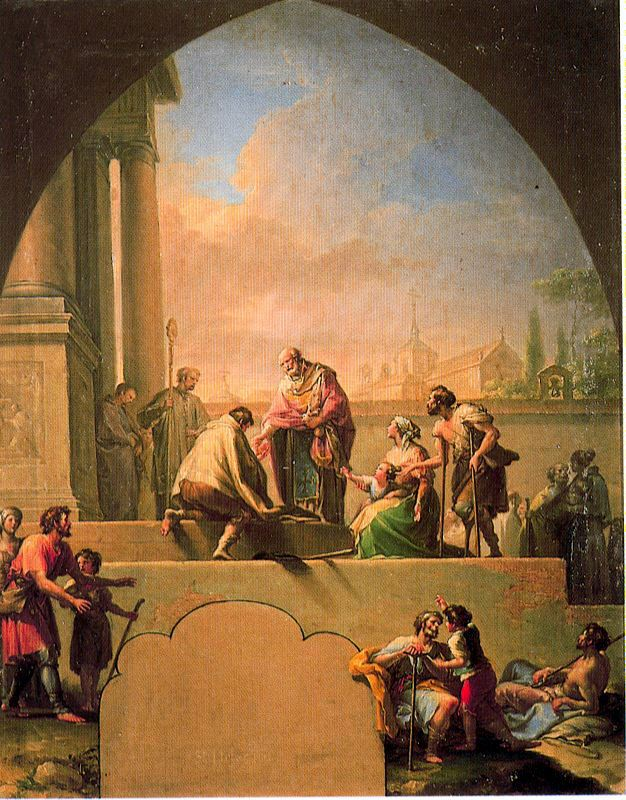
The Charity of Saint Elladius of Toledo by Francisco Bayeu (Cloister of Toledo Cathedral).

Helladius, Eladio or Elladio of Toledo (died 633, in Toledo) was a Christian archbishop. Born into a Visigothic noble family in Spain, he initially held important positions at court but was attracted to the monastic life and took his vows at the Agali monastery. He became its abbot and later archbishop of Toledo. The Roman Martyrology gives his feast as 18 February.

== Life ==
A major functionary in the Visigoth court, he was sent to the Third Council of Toledo in 589 by Reccared I as a royal representative - this concluded by condemning Arianism. Attracted to the monastic life, he made frequent visits to the Agali monastery and soon took his vows there. He became its abbot in 605 but continued to undertake all the menial duties of an ordinary monk, such as bringing in firewood.

On Aurasio's death in 615 he extremely reluctantly replaced him as archbishop. Ildefonsus studied under him, was ordained deacon by him in 632-33 and later wrote his biography, mentioning his gifts to the poor and stating "It was as if his warmth and vitality flowed directly into their limbs and their souls". He held the post for eighteen years and is theorized to have supported Sisebut in his policy of forced conversion and expulsion of the Jews.

== Iconography ==
He is depicted carrying straw or firewood to an oven.

== Bibliography ==
- Alban Butler, Il primo grande dizionario dei santi secondo il calendario Casale Monferrato, Edizioni PIEMME, 2001 ISBN 88-384-6913-X
