= Quiricus (bishop of Toledo) =

Quiricus (died January 680) was the metropolitan bishop of Toledo from about 667 until his death. He may be identical to Bishop Quiricus of Barcelona, who does not appear as bishop there after 667. If so, his transfer to Toledo was contrary to canon law, but would demonstrate the growing importance of Toledo in the Visigothic church.

In 672, in accordance with the tenth canon of the Eighth Council of Toledo, Quiricus anointed the duly elected Wamba after the death of Reccesuinth. In 675 he presided over the Eleventh Council of Toledo. In 681 the ecumenical Third Council of Constantinople repudiated monothelitism and affirmed the doctrine of dythelitism, that Christ had two wills. A decision of the council was sent to Quiricus, but he had died by the time it reached Spain.

== Sources ==
- Collins, Roger. Visigothic Spain, 409–711. Oxford: Blackwell Publishing, 2004. ISBN 0-631-18185-7.
- Thompson, E. A. The Goths in Spain. Oxford: Clarendon Press, 1969.
