= Church of San Vicente, Toledo =

Medieval church in Castile-La Mancha, Spain

Coordinates: 39.8558°N 4.0217°W

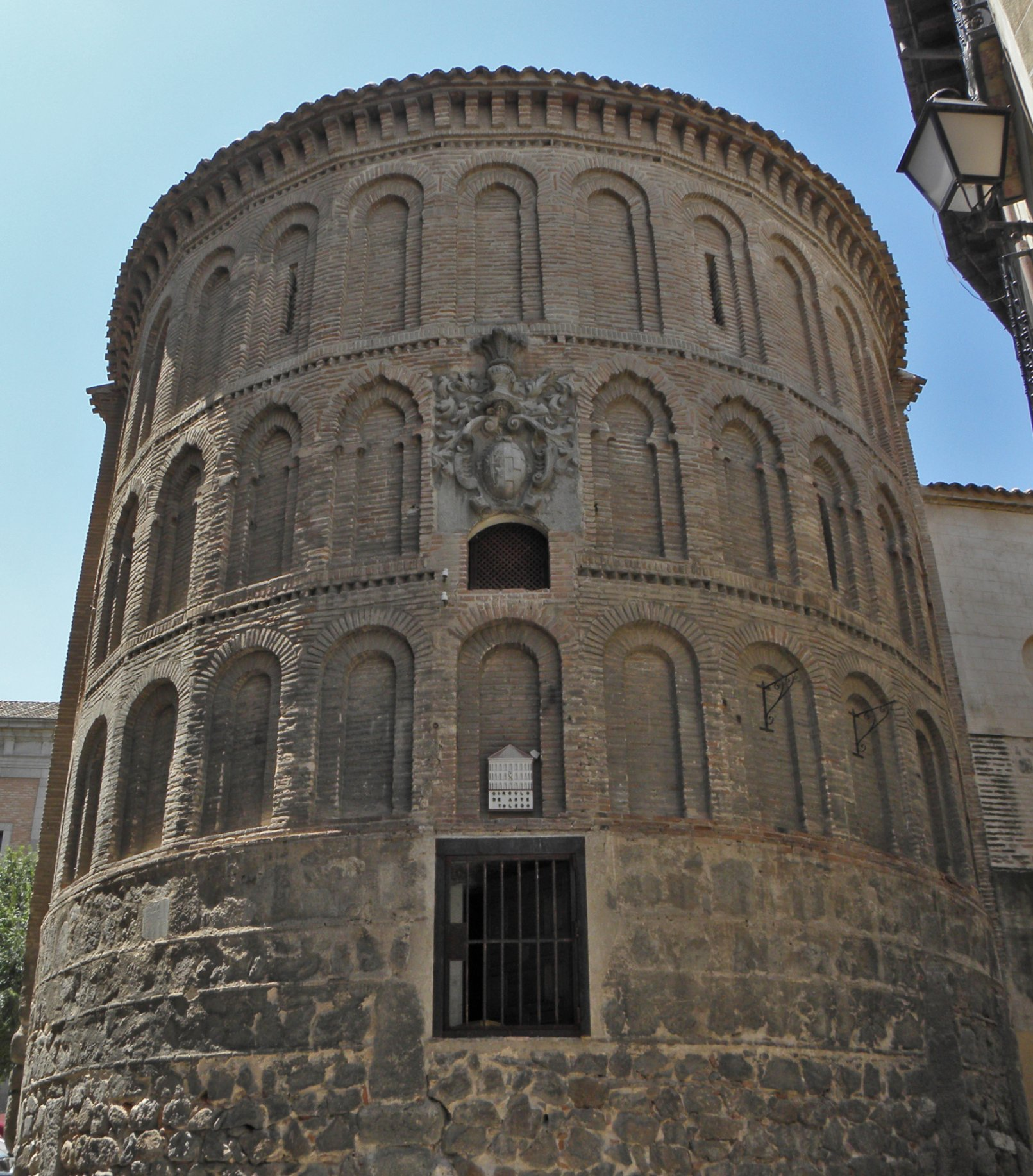
Apse of the church

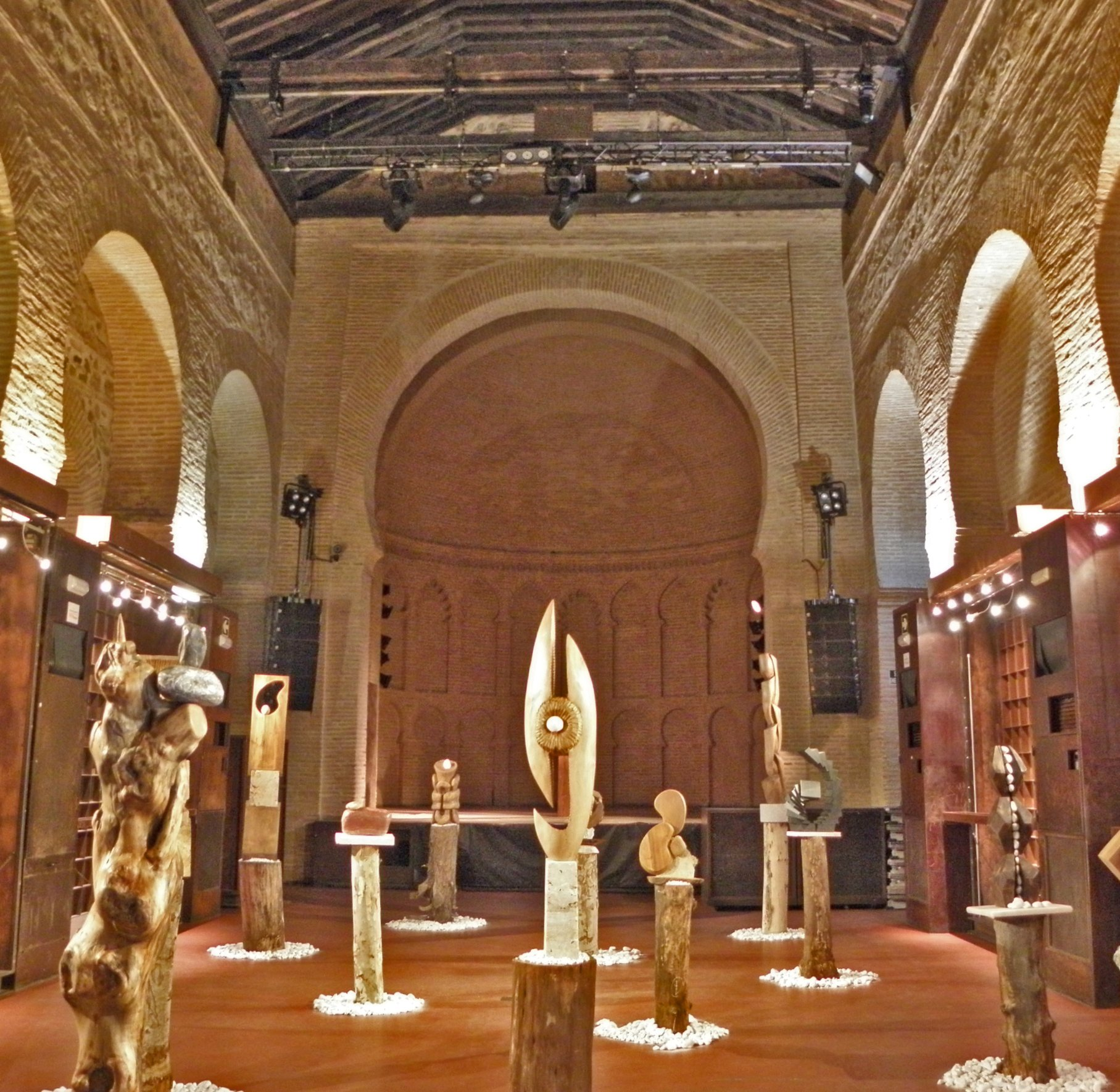
Toledo Art Circle

The Iglesia de San Vicente is a medieval church located in Toledo (Castile-La Mancha, Spain), it appears as a parish already in 1125, although, there is documentation that speaks of its being founded by Alfonso VI shortly after his conquest of the city in 1085.

The current building is the result of successive reconstructions, transformations and additions. The oldest element preserved is the mudejar apse. Judging by its structure, the apse does not appear to be earlier than the 13th century. It follows a type very similar to that of another church in Toledo, Cristo de la Vega, in which the exterior stands out, and the straight section, which precedes the apse proper. Another feature consistent with that date is the use of friezes in the corner, separating horizontally the bodies of arches, and the same typology of arches, which repeats the folded half-points and the horseshoe pointed, covered by lobed, appearing in the Cristo de la Vega.

The whole was disfigured by adding, on the axis, a large Baroque shield and opening two spans, for illumination of the main chapel and a crypt. In the interior it conserves the double archery that runs the perimeter of the apse, simple blind arches of horseshoe. To the right, taking advantage of the thickness of the wall, has incorporated a small Gothic chapel, with vault of crossery, of beginnings of the 14th century.

Once the parish was abolished in 1842, the building now houses the Circle, part of the Toledo Museum of Art.
