= Agali monastery =

The monastery of Agali, probably dedicated to Saints Cosmas and Damian, was founded around 590/600 in the vicinity of Toledo. It probably lay along the important road from Complutum to Gaul. Several of its monks became bishops of Toledo during the seventh century.

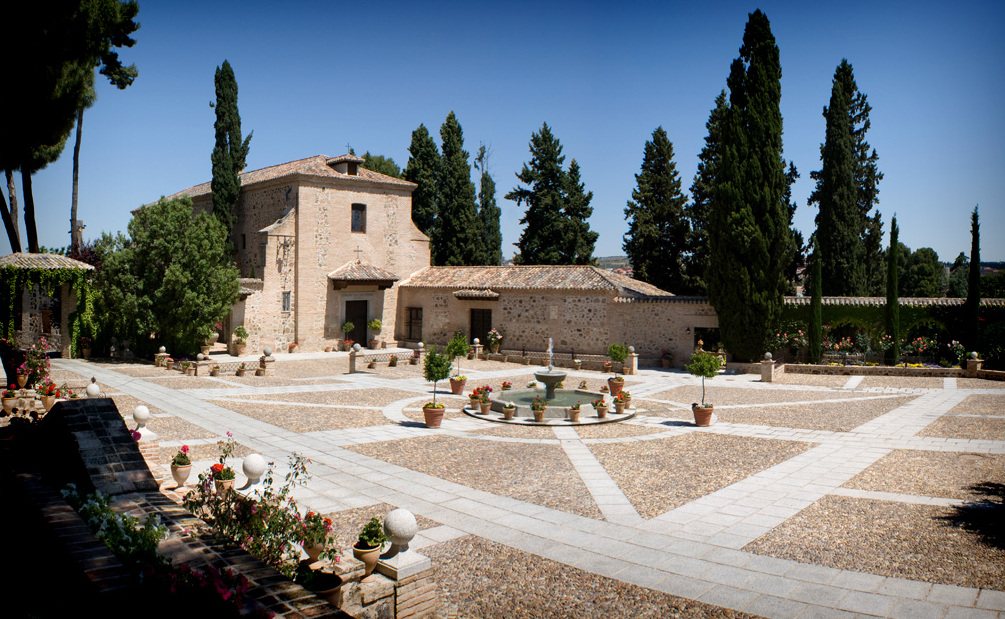
Hermitage of Santo Ángel Custodio, which may be at the same location as Agali

Agali was one of the earliest sites of regular monasticism—"monastic communities following received rules"—in central, southern or western Spain, although such communities did exist prior to the late sixth century on the Mediterranean coast and in the northeast. In the rest of Spain there was "an older tradition of individual or family asceticism, represented by voluntary celibacy and the setting up of private monastic households". Regular monasticism seems to have been introduced by exiles from Africa, fleeing the Byzantine government's enforced resolution of the Three Chapters controversy and the Berber raids precipitated by Byzantine military weakness. Agali may have been founded by these African expatriates.

Agali's second abbot, Helladius, became bishop of Toledo in 615. He was succeeded as abbot by Justus, a monk of Agali from childhood. In 633, Helladius returned to Agali to die. During his final days, he consecrated as a deacon the monk Ildefonsus, who subsequently became abbot and finally bishop in 657. Helladius was succeeded as bishop by Justus, who was succeeded as abbot by Richila. While bishop, Justus sent a now lost treatise to his eventual successor Richila, but its contents are unknown. In 636, Justus was succeeded by Eugenius II, another monk of Agali and student of Helladius, who had followed his teacher to Toledo in 615.

Agali constituted a major cluster of ecclesiastical activity for the last century of the existence of Visigothic Spain.

== Sources ==
- Collins, Roger. Visigothic Spain, 409–711. Oxford: Blackwell Publishing, 2004.
- García Moreno, Luis A. "Los monjes y monasterios en las ciudades de las Españas tardorromanos y visigodas", Habis 24 (1993), 179–92.
