= City walls of Toledo =

Series of walls around Toledo, Spain

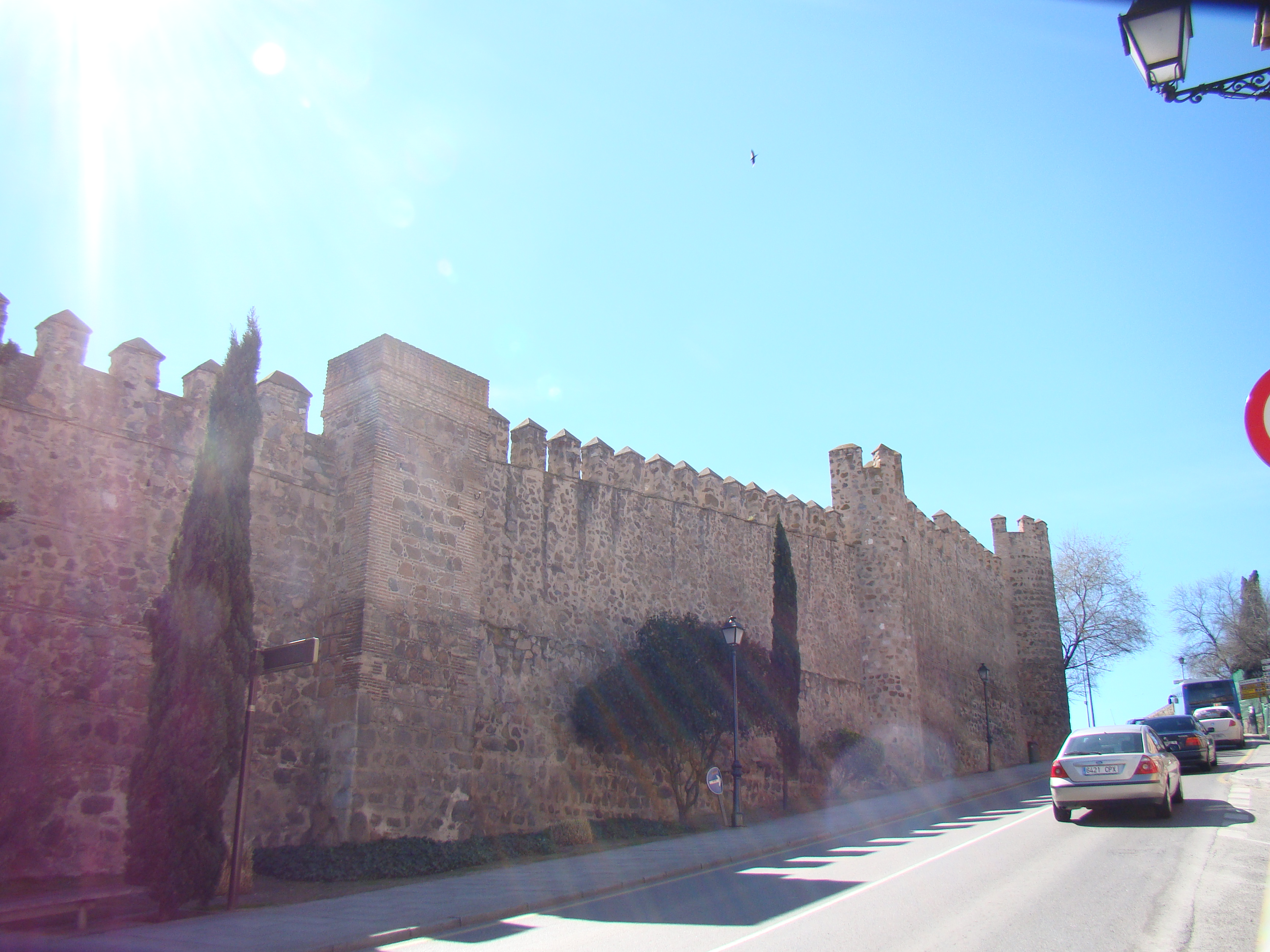
Part of the City Walls of Toledo

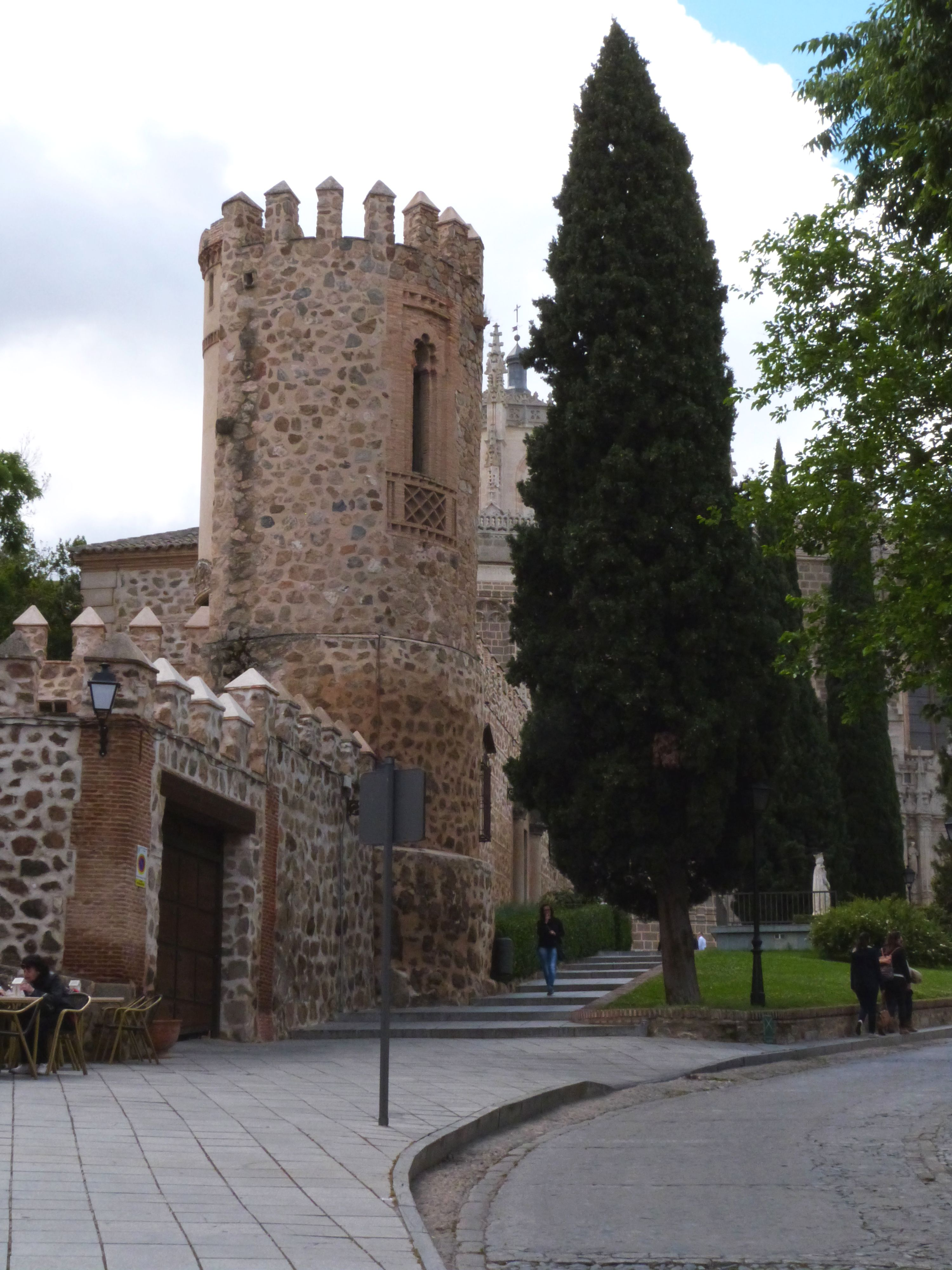
Visigothic enclosure of the city walls, with Muslim additions

The City Walls of Toledo are the city walls of Toledo, Castile-La Mancha, Spain. They were made by several civilizations that inhabited Toledo.

Toledo was first walled by Romans, and the remains of some Roman walls can still be found today. Stones of these walls were reused during reconstruction by the Visigoths, who tripled the walls in size.

The Visigoth King Wamba restored the old walls and had inscriptions carved on the city gates. These inscriptions were destroyed by the Muslims. Others were added in 1575 by the Corregidor Juan Gutiérrez Tello.

The Arabs enlarged the walls and the city of Toledo. After the Reconquista, the walls were further enlarged and new gates were constructed.
