= Eugenius II of Toledo =

Saint Eugenius II (died 13 November 657), sometimes called Eugenius the Younger as the successor of Eugenius I, was Archbishop of Toledo from 647 until his death.

He is called Eugenius secundus (Eugene the second) in the biography of Archbishop Julian of Toledo by a certain Felix, but in later histories he is sometimes numbered Eugenius III when a legendary martyr and first bishop of Toledo is included.

== Life ==
Eugenius was the son of a Goth named Evantius. He became a cleric in the cathedral of Toledo. Until 646 he was the archdeacon of Braulio of Zaragoza. At the death of Archbishop Eugenius of Toledo in 647, Eugenius the Younger was selected as his successor. Braulio petitioned the king to let him retain his archdeacon, but the king refused, saying that his choice of the young Eugenius was inspired by God. Eugenius had fled to Zaragoza from Toledo earlier in life because of reasons unknown, but was forced to return to Toledo by King Chindaswinth and take up the government of that see. Inexperienced in church government, Eugenius II would consult with Bishop Braulio. He also attended the eighth synod of Toledo, called by Chindaswinth in December of 653, and a General synod in December 656.

Though of small stature and feeble health he was a zealous prelate. He undertook the reform of the ecclesiastical chant of the Divine Office and achieved distinction as a writer of prose and poetry.

Eugenius II died 13 November 657. His feast is kept on 13 November.

== Works ==
His poems, though lacking polish and elegance, are full of fire, spirit, and poetic movement. His thought is solid, fertile, and gives evidence of a well-trained mind.

Eugenius left two books in prose and verse, containing his poems on religious and secular subjects, his recension of the poem of Dracontius on "The Six days of Creation", to which he added a "Seventh Day", and a letter to King Chindaswinth explaining the plan of the entire work. He also edited the metrical "Satisfactio" of Dracontius, an account of the writer's misfortunes.

Of this work Bardenhewer says that it "underwent a substantial revision at the hands of Eugenius II, Bishop of Toledo, in keeping with the wish of the Visigothic King Chindaswinth; not only were the poetical form and the theology of the poem affected by this treatment, but probably also its political sentiments. It is this revision that was usually printed as Dracontii Elegia, until the edition of Arévalo (Rome, 1791, 362-402, and 901-32) made known the original text".

He also wrote a treatise on the Trinity probably against the Arian Visigoths. Ferrera mentions a letter of Eugenius to the king and one to Protasius, the Metropolitan of Tarragona, promising if possible to write a mass of St. Hippolytus and some festal sermons, but disclaiming the ability to equal his former productions.

Eugenius left an epitaph for a number of individuals, including five to himself and one to King Chindaswinth, who died in 653.

== Sources ==
- Jacques Sirmond, Opera (Venice, 1728), II, 610;
- Patrologia Latina, LXXXVII, 347-418;
- Ferrara, History of Spain, ad ann. 647-658;
- Gams, Kirchengesch. Spaniens (1874), II, 2, 132-35;
- Michaud, Biog. Univ. (Paris, 1826).
