= Cixila =

Archbishop of Toledo

Cixila (died 783) was the Archbishop of Toledo from 774 until his death in 783. He was archbishop during the Muslim control of most of Spain.

== Sources ==
- This article is based on the Spanish Wikipedia article on Cixila.
