= Ildefonsus =

Spanish scholar, theologian and bishop

Saint Ildephonsus of Toledo
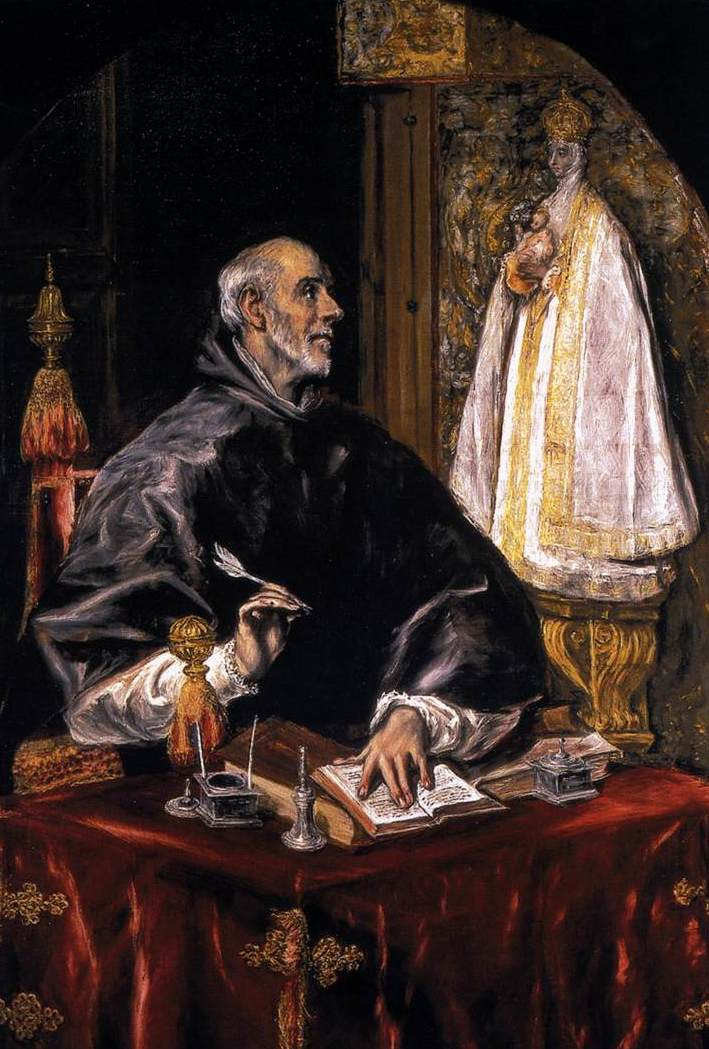
- Saint Ildefonsus by El Greco.

Bishop of Toledo
- Born: 8 December 607
- Died: 23 January 667
- Venerated in: Roman Catholic Church; Eastern Orthodox Church
- Feast: 23 January

Ildefonsus or Ildephonsus (rarely Ildephoses or Ildefonse; Spanish: San Ildefonso; c. 8 December A.D. 607 – 23 January A.D. 667) was a scholar and theologian who served as the Metropolitan Archbishop of Toledo for the last decade of his life. His Gothic name was Hildefuns. In the Ethiopian Orthodox Tewahedo Church he is known as Dexius (ደቅስዮስ Daqsəyos) based on the Ge'ez translation of legends about his life.

Although his writings were less influential outside of Hispania, Ildefonsus was canonised and remained a potent force in the Iberian Peninsula for centuries. Spanish missionaries, and to a lesser extent Portuguese ones, spread his ideas worldwide.

== Life ==
Ildefonsus was born to a prominent Visigothic family in Toledo during the reign of Witteric. Civil wars racked the Visigothic kingdom during most of Ildefonsus' life. His uncle Eugenius, who later became Toledo's bishop, began educating the devout youth. Ildefonsus began his religious career circa A.D. 632 when Bishop Eladius of Toledo ordained him as a deacon. However, Ildefonse defied his family's plans for his clerical career by becoming a monk at the Agali monastery outside the city. While he was still a simple monk, he founded and endowed a monastery of nuns. In 650 Ildefonsus was elected its abbot of Agali. In that capacity, he attended two synods of the Iberian church, the eighth and ninth Councils of Toledo. When his uncle Bishop Eugenius II died in 657, Ildefonsus was elected his successor as bishop of Toledo. King Recceswinth compelled him to accept the position, as Ildefonsus later complained to his protégé and successor, Bishop Quiricus of Barcelona.

== Legends ==
At the end of the eighth century, Cixila, Archbishop of Toledo, embellished the biography of his predecessor. He relates that Ildephonsus was praying one day before the relics of Saint Leocadia when the martyr arose from her tomb and thanked him for the devotion he showed towards the Mother of God.

It was reported that on 18 December 665 he experienced a vision of the Blessed Virgin when she appeared to him in person and presented him with a priestly vestment, to reward him for his zeal in honouring her. As Bishop Ildefonsus and the congregation sang Marian hymns, light engulfed the church, causing most worshippers to flee. Ildefonsus, remaining with a few deacons, saw Mary descend and sit on the episcopal throne. She praised Ildefonsus for his devotion, and vested him with a special chasuble from her son's treasury, which she instructed the bishop to wear only during Marian festivals. In part because of the vision, Rome later elevated Toledo's status to the metropolitan see of Carthaginiensis, with the most authority in the Iberian Peninsula.

== Death and legacy ==
Ildefonsus died after a decade in office and was buried at his (and the city's) basilica, Toledo's Church of Santa Leocadia. Another Council of Toledo decreed that henceforth 18 December would be celebrated as a Marian feast day, to commemorate his vision, although some sources claim that feast day was added to the calendar during the 10th Council (where Ildefonsus had served as a reporter), along with the Feast of the Annunciation on 25 March. Even during the Muslim occupation, when the basilica was converted into a mosque, the area where the vision occurred remained sacred and dedicated to the Virgin Mary. Pilgrims travelled to Toledo to see the stone where Mary stepped during Ildefonsus' vision. During later wars, Ildefonsus' remains were transferred to Zamora, where they remain at the Church of Sts. Peter and Ildefonso.

Quiricus, the dedicatee of Ildefonsus' De perpetua virginitate, succeeded him as bishop. His later successor, Julian, included Ildefonsus among the biographies added in his own continuation to the De viris illustribus. Another successor, Cixila, wrote a hagiographical life of Ildefonsus. During the 13th century, the Dominican Rodrigo de Cerrato included Ildefonsus among his vignettes of illustrious men.

Ildefonsus is considered a patron saint of Toledo, Zamora, and several smaller towns. His feast day is 23 January, the date of his death. In Olula del Río (Almería), festivities begin with a bonfire and fireworks the previous night, and continue with a traditional procession of the saint's image with bread being tossed onto onlookers. Iberian missionaries promoted San Ildefonso worldwide, including the San Ildefonso Peninsula and municipalities San Ildefonso, Bulacan, Patron Saint of Tanay, Rizal and San Ildefonso, Ilocos Sur in the Philippines, San Ildefonso Ixtahuacán in Guatemala, San Ildefonso, San Vicente in El Salvador and San Ildefonso Pueblo, New Mexico.

== Theology and writings ==
=== De perpetua virginitate Mariae ===
Ildefonso writing De perpetua virginitate, from the Parma Ildefonsus

Some consider Ildefonsus the source of common Spanish allusions to Mary as "the Virgin" rather than "Our Lady" per French or "the Lady" in Italian practice. Ildefonsus' most important work was his De perpetua virginitate Mariae contra tres infideles, which imitated an earlier work by Jerome, and became the center of Spanish Marian theology. The three heretics reflected the Marian teaching of Eligius, with whom Ildefonsus disagreed theologically. Ildefonsus utilises Isidore's "synonymous method" (or Synonyma Ciceronis) for theological purposes, wherein he repeats every phrase several times in different, although purportedly identical, ways. The identifications reveal the arguments in a rhetorically strong way, and lexicographers study the synonyms Ildefonsus used. Ildefonsus also probably wrote the Visigothic Mass of Ascension, which explains how the benefits received from Christ are richer than the wonders he performed, such as "ascending unaided to the clouds". Theologically, Ildefonsus regarded the Nicene Creed as sufficientem scientiam salutarem (sufficient knowledge for salvation) and as a foedus (compact) between believer and God. Like Isidore of Seville before him, Ildefonsus regarded the creed as forming "two pacts" between God and believer: one renouncing the devil, and another the statement of belief itself. Ildefonsus encouraged frequent Communion, implying that normal practice was infrequent, and insisted upon preparation, which may have discouraged many.

=== De viris illustribus ===
Ildefonsus' De viris illustribus is a continuation, in thirteen parts, of a work of Isidore bearing the same name. The book contains no biblical quotations, but expands the biographies of famous writers to include illustrious leaders in the church and government, including Isidore himself (though Ildefonsus appears ignorant of Braulio of Zaragoza's better biography of Isidore). Ildefonsus' edition emphasised the monastic backgrounds of Toledo's earlier bishops (adding seven biographies). Nonetheless, modern editors note his pastoral concern and emphasis on praedicatio (preaching). Ildefonsus' continuation became an important historical source concerning Toledo during the 6th and 7th centuries. Ildefonsus also prepared an anthology of Isidore's works, excluding the Epistula ad Leudefredum.

=== De cognitione baptismi ===
In his De cognitione baptismi, Ildefonsus explained the biblical origins of the sacrament, as well as Hispanic baptismal practices and important prayers. The work relied on Augustine's narrative concerning the psalms, as well as Gregory the Great's moral teachings, and Isidore's Etymologies. With respect to the latter, Ildefonsus dared to disagree with Isidore concerning Masses for the dead who had not had their last rites. Julian of Toledo in his Prognosticum followed Ildefonsus in arguing that such could still be effective. Ildefonsus also wrote De progressu spiritualis deserti elaborating on the same themes, analogizing baptism as a personal equivalent to the Israelites crossing the Red Sea, and the beginning of a personal spiritual journey.

=== Minor writings ===
Several of Ildefonsus's letters to Quiricus of Barcelona survive. Julian of Toledo in the Elogium Ildefonsi mentions two lost works by Ildefonsus: Liber Prosopopoeia Imbecillitatis Propriae and Opusculum de proprietate personarum Patris, et Filii et Spiritus Sancti. The former treatise (on his own imbecility) was probably a confessional monologue or dialogue, and Valerius of Bierzo may have used it as a model. The latter deals with monothelitism, a heresy of the time.

His work Libellus de Corona Virginis has recently (2021) been translated by Robert Nixon OSB and published as Crown of the Virgin: An Ancient Meditation on Mary's Beauty, Virtue, and Sanctity by Catholic publisher TAN Books.

== See also ==
- Saint Ildefonsus, patron saint archive

== Sources ==
- Collins, Roger. Visigothic Spain, 409–711. Oxford: Blackwell Publishing, 2004. ISBN 0-631-18185-7.
- Collins, Roger. "The 'Autobiographical' Works of Valerius of Bierzo: their Structure and Purpose." Los Visigodos: Historia y Civilización. ed. A. González Blanco. Murcia: Universidad de Murcia, 1986. Reprinted in Law, Culture and Regionalism in Early Medieval Spain. Variorum, 1992. ISBN 0-86078-308-1.
- Collins, Roger. "Julian of Toledo and the Education of Kings in Late Seventh-Century Spain." Law, Culture and Regionalism in Early Medieval Spain. Variorum, 1992. ISBN 0-86078-308-1. Revised version of "Julian of Toledo and the Royal Succession in Late Seventh Century Spain," Early Medieval Kingship, edd. P. H. Sawyer and I. N. Wood. Leeds: School of History, University of Leeds, 1977.
- James, Edward (ed.) Visigothic Spain: New Approaches. Oxford: Oxford University Press, 1980. ISBN 0-19-822543-1.
- Ildefonsus. De viris illustribus, ed. and trans. by C. Codoñer Merino in Acta Salmanticensia, Filosofía y Letras, 65. Salamanca, 1972.
