= History of Toledo, Spain =

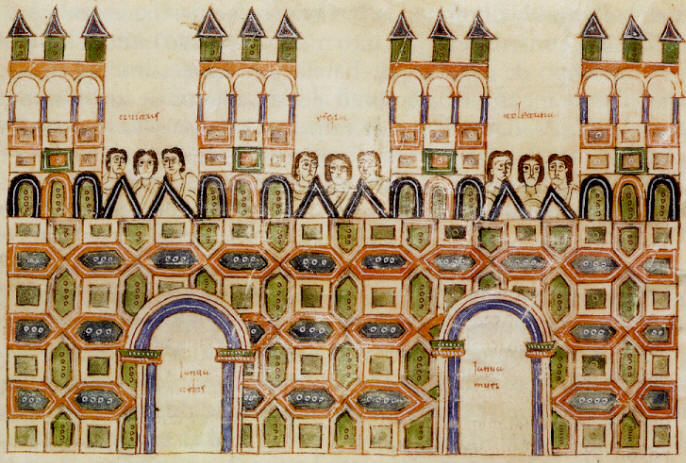
The city of Toledo as depicted in the Codex Vigilanus in 976.

Toledo is the repository of more than 2000 years of history. Successively a Roman municipium, the capital of the Visigothic Kingdom, a major city in Al-Andalus and the Kingdom of Castile. Its many works of art and architecture are the product of three major religions – Judaism, Christianity and Islam.

== Antiquity ==
Toledo (Latin: Toletum) is mentioned by the Roman historian Livy (c. 59 BC – 17 AD) as urbs parva, sed loco munita ("a small city, but fortified by location"). Roman general Marcus Fulvius Nobilior fought a battle near the city in 193 BC against a confederation of Celtic tribes including the Vaccaei, Vettones, and Celtiberi, defeating them and capturing a king called Hilermus. At that time, Toletum was a city of the Carpetani tribe, and part of the region of Carpetania. It was incorporated into the Roman Empire as a civitas stipendiaria, that is, a tributary city of non-citizens. It later achieved the status of municipium by Flavian times. With this status, city officials, even of Carpetani origin, obtained Roman citizenship for public service, and the forms of Roman law and politics were increasingly adopted. At approximately this time were constructed in Toletum a Roman circus, city walls, public baths, and a municipal water supply and storage system.

The Roman circus in Toledo was one of the largest in Hispania, at 423 metres (1,388 feet) long and 100 metres (330 feet) wide, with a track dimension of 408 metres (1,339 feet) long and 86 metres (282 feet) wide. Chariot races were held on special holidays and were also commissioned by private citizens to celebrate career achievements. A fragmentary stone inscription records circus games paid for by a citizen of unknown name to celebrate his achieving the sevirate, a kind of priesthood conferring high status. Archaeologists have also identified portions of a special seat of the sort used by the city elites to attend circus games, called a sella curulis. The circus could hold up to 15,000 spectators.

During Roman times, Toledo was never a provincial capital nor a conventus iuridicus. It started to gain importance in late antiquity. There are indications that large private houses (domus) within the city walls were enlarged, while several large villas were built north of the city through the third and fourth centuries. Games were held in the circus into the late fourth and early fifth centuries C.E., also an indication of active city life and ongoing patronage by wealthy elites. A church council was held in Toledo in the year 400 to discuss the conflict with Priscillianism.

A second council of Toledo was held in 527. The Visigothic king Theudis was in Toledo in 546, where he promulgated a law. This is strong though not certain evidence that Toledo was the chief residence for Theudis. King Athanagild died in Toledo, probably in 568. Although Theudis and Athangild based themselves in Toledo, Toledo was not yet the capital city of the Iberian peninsula, as Theudis and Athangild's power was limited in extent, the Suevi ruling Galicia and local elites dominating Lusitania, Betica, and Cantabria. This changed with Liuvigild (Leovigild), who brought the peninsula under his control. The Visigoths ruled from Toledo until the Moors conquered the Iberian peninsula in the early years of 8th century (711–719).

Today the historic centre is pierced of basements, passages, wells, baths and ancient water pipes that since Roman times have been used in the city.

== Visigothic Toledo ==
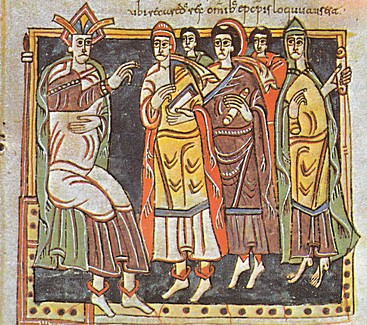
10th century depiction of the 589 Council of Toledo

A series of church councils was held in Toledo under the Visigoths. A synod of Arian bishops was held in 580 to discuss theological reconciliation with Nicene Christianity. Liuvigild's successor, Reccared, hosted the third council of Toledo, at which the Visigothic kings abandoned Arianism and reconciled with the existing Hispano-Roman episcopate. A synod held in 610 transferred the metropolitanate of the old province of Carthaginensis from Cartagena to Toledo. At that time, Cartagena was ruled by the Byzantines, and this move ensured a closer relation between the bishops of Spain and the Visigothic kings. King Sisebut forced Jews in the Visigothic kingdom to convert to Christianity; this act was criticised and efforts were made to reverse it at the Fourth Council of Toledo in 633.

The Fifth and Sixth Councils of Toledo placed church sanctions on anyone who would challenge the Visigothic kings. The Seventh Council of Toledo instituted a requirement that all bishops in the area of a royal city, that is, of Toledo, must reside for one month per year in Toledo. This was a stage in "the elevation of Toledo as the primatial see of the whole church of the Visgothic kingdom". In addition, the seventh council declared that any clergy fleeing the kingdom, assisting conspirators against the king, or aiding conspirators, would be excommunicated and no one should remove this sentence. The ban on lifting these sentences of excommunication was lifted at the Eighth Council of Toledo in 653, at which, for the first time, decisions were signed by palace officials as well as bishops.

The eighth council of Toledo took measures that enhanced Toledo's significance as the centre of royal power in the Iberian peninsula. The council declared that the election of a new king following the death of the old one should only take place in the royal city, or wherever the old king died. In practice this handed the power to choose kings to only such palace officials and military commanders who were in regular attendance on the king. The decision also took king-making power away from the bishops, who would be in their own sees and would not have time to come together to attend the royal election. The decision did allow the bishop of Toledo, alone among bishops, to be involved in decisions concerning the royal Visigothic succession. The ninth and tenth councils were held in rapid succession in 655 and 656.

When Reccesuinth died in 672 at his villa in Gerticos, his successor Wamba was elected on the spot, then went to Toledo to be anointed king by the bishop of Toledo, according to the procedures laid out in prior church councils. In 673, Wamba defeated a rebel duke named Paul, and held his victory parade in Toledo. The parade included ritual humiliation and scalping of the defeated Paul. Wamba carried out renovation works in Toledo in 674–675, marking these with inscriptions above the city gates that are no longer extant but were recorded in the eighth century. The Eleventh Council of Toledo was held in 675 under king Wamba. Wamba weakened the power of the bishop of Toledo by creating a new bishopric outside Toledo at the church of Saints Peter and Paul. This was one of the main churches of Toledo and was the church where Wamba was anointed king, and the church from which Visigothic kings departed for war after special ceremonies in which they were presented with a relic of the True Cross. By creating a new bishopric there, Wamba removed power over royal succession from the bishop of Toledo and granted it to the new bishop.

The Twelfth Council of Toledo was held in 681 after Wamba's removal from office. Convinced that he was dying, Wamba had accepted a state of penitence that according to the decision of a previous church council, made him ineligible to remain king. The Twelfth Council, led by newly installed bishop Julian confirmed the validity of Wamba's removal from office and his succession by Ervig. The Twelfth Council eliminated the new bishopric that Wamba had created and returned the powers over succession to the bishop of Toledo.

The Twelfth Council of Toledo approved 28 laws against the Jews. Julian of Toledo, despite a Jewish origin, was strongly anti-Semitic as reflected in his writings and activities. The leading Jews of Toledo were assembled in the church of Saint Mary on January 27, 681, where the new laws were read out to them.

The Thirteenth, Fourteenth, and Fifteenth Councils of Toledo were held in 683, 684, and 688. The Thirteenth Council restored property and legal rights to those who had rebelled against King Wamba in 673. The Thirteenth Council also approved laws protecting the king's family after the king's death. In 687, Ervig took the penitent state before dying, and the kingship passed to Egica, who was anointed king in Toledo on November 24. In 688, the Fifteenth Council lifted the ban on taking property from the families of former kings, whereupon Egica was able to plunder Ervig's family properties.

In the late seventh century, Toledo became a main centre of literacy and writing in the Iberian peninsula. Toledo's development as a centre of learning was influenced by Isidore of Seville, an author and advocate of literacy who attended several church councils in Toledo. King Chindasuinth had a royal library in Toledo, and at least one count called Laurentius had a private library. Sometime before 651, Chindasuinth sent the bishop of Zaragoza, Taio, to Rome to obtain books that were not available in Toledo. Taio obtained, at least, parts of pope Gregory's Moralia. The library also contained a copy of a Hexameron by Dracontius, which Chindasuinth liked so much that he commissioned Eugenius II to revise it by adding a new part dealing with the seventh day of creation. Chindasuinth issued laws that were gathered together in a book called Liber Iudiciorum by his successor Reccesuinth in 654; this book was revised twice, widely copied, and was an important influence on medieval Spanish law. Three bishops of Toledo wrote works that were widely copied and disseminated in western Europe and parts of which survive to this day: Eugenius II, Ildefonsus, and Julian. "In intellectual terms the leading Spanish churchmen of the seventh century had no equals before the appearance of Bede."

In 693, the Sixteenth Council of Toledo condemned Sisebert, Julian's successor as bishop of Toledo, for having rebelled against King Egica in alliance with Liuvigoto, the widow of king Ervig. A rebel king called Suniefred seized power in Toledo briefly at about this time. Whether or not Sisebert's and Suniefred's rebellions were the same or separate is unknown. Suniefred is known only from having minted coins in Toledo during what should have been Egica's reign. The Seventeenth Council of Toledo was held in 694. The Eighteenth Council of Toledo, the last one, took place shortly after Egica's death around 702 or 703.

By the end of the seventh century the bishop of Toledo was the leader of the Spanish bishops, a situation unusual in Europe: "The metropolitan bishops of Toledo had achieved by the last quarter of the seventh century an authority and a primacy that was unique in Western Europe. Not even the pope could count on such support from neighbouring metropolitans." Toledo "had been matched by no other city in western Europe outside Italy as the governmental and symbolic centre of a powerful monarchy." Toledo had "emerged from relative obscurity to become the permanent governmental centre of the Visigothic monarchy; a true capital, whose only equivalent in western Europe was to be Lombard Pavia."

When Wittiza died around 710, Ruderic became Visigothic king in Toledo, but the kingdom was split, as a rival king Achila ruled Tarraconensis and Narbonensis. Meanwhile, Arabic and Berber troops under Musa ibn Nusayr had conquered Tangiers and Ceuta between 705 and 710, and commenced raids into the Visigothic kingdom in 711. Ruderic led an army to confront the raiders. He was defeated and killed in battle, apparently after being betrayed by Visigothic nobles who wished to replace him as king and did not consider the Arabs and Berbers a serious threat. The commander of the invading forces was Tariq bin Ziyad, a Luwata Berber freedman in the service of governor Musa. It is possible that a king called Oppa ruled in Toledo between Ruderic's death and the fall of Toledo. Tariq, seizing the opportunity presented by the death of Ruderic and the internal divisions of the Visigothic nobles, captured Toledo, in 711 or 712. Governor Musa disembarked in Cádiz and proceeded to Toledo, where he executed numerous Visigothic nobles, thus destroying much of the Visigothic power structure. Collins suggests that the Visigothic emphasis on Toledo as the centre of royal ceremony became a weakness. Since the king was chosen in or around Toledo, by nobles based in Toledo, and had to be anointed king by the bishop of Toledo in a church in Toledo, when Tariq captured Toledo and executed the Visigothic nobles, having already killed the king, there was no way for the Visigoths to select a legitimate king.

== Toledo under Islamic rule ==
Soon after the conquest, Musa and Tariq returned to Damascus. The Arab centre of administration was placed first in Seville, then moved to Cordoba. With most of the rest of the Iberian peninsula, Toledo was ruled from Cordoba by the governor of Al-Andalus, under the ultimate notional command of the Umayyad Caliph in Damascus. Arab conquerors had often replaced former capital cities with new ones to mark the change in political power, and they did so here: "Toledo suffered a period of profound decline throughout much of the earlier centuries of Arab dominance in the peninsula." The invaders were ethnically diverse, and available evidence suggests that in the area of Toledo, Berber settlement predominated over Arab.

In 742 the Berbers in Al-Andalus rebelled against the Arab Umayyad governors. They took control of the north and marched south, laying siege to Toledo. After a siege of one month the Berber troops were defeated outside Toledo by troops sent from Cordoba by the governor Abd al-Malik ibn Katan and commanded by the governor's son. However, while Ibn Katan's troops were engaged with the Berbers, his Arab allies betrayed and killed him and took over Cordoba. After the Arabs' first leader, Thalaba ibn Salama, died, Yusuf al-Fihri became ruler of Al-Andalus. The Umayyad dynasty in Damascus collapsed and Yusuf ruled independently with the support of his Syrian Arab forces. The Qays Arab commander As-Sumayl was made governor of Toledo under Yusuf around 753.

There is evidence that Toledo retained its importance as a literary and ecclesiastical center into the middle 700s, in the Chronicle of 754, the life of Saint Ildefonsus by Cixila, and ecclesiastical letters sent from Toledo. The eighth century bishop of Toledo, Cixila, wrote a life of Saint Ildefonsus of Toledo, probably before 737. This life of Ildefonsus emphasized two episodes in the life of the bishop of Toledo. In the first episode the covering of the tomb of Saint Leocadia levitated while Ildefonsus was saying mass, with king Reccesuinth present. In the second episode Mary appears to Ildefonsus and Reccesuinth. These episodes are said to have resulted from Ildefonsus' devotion to Saint Leocadia, patroness saint of Toledo. Collins suggests that Cixila's life of Ildefonsus helped maintain Ildefonsus' appeal and helped the church in Toledo to retain some of its authority among Christian churches in the Iberian peninsula.

An archdeacon in Toledo called Evantius, who was active around 720 and died in 737, wrote a letter to address the existence of judaizing tendencies among the Christians of Zaragoza, specifically the belief that there are unclean forms of meat and the literal interpretation of Deuteronomic law. A deacon and cantor from Toledo called Peter wrote a second letter, to Seville, in about the year 750, to explain that they were celebrating Easter and a September liturgical fast incorrectly, again confusing them with Jewish feasts celebrated at the same time. These letters show that some of the primacy of the church of Toledo within the Iberian peninsula still existed in the 700s: "Not only were its clerics still well enough equipped in intellectual terms to provide authoritative guidance on a wide range of ecclesiastical discipline and doctrine, but this was also actively sought."

There is a strong possibility that the Chronicle of 754 was written in Toledo (though scholars have also proposed Cordoba and Guadix) based on the information available to the chronicler. The chronicler showed awareness of the Historia Gothorum, the Etymologiae, and the chronicle of Isidore of Seville, the work of Braulio of Zaragoza, the acts of the councils of Toledo, De Perpetua Virginitate by Ildefonsus, and De Comprobatione Sextae Aetatis and Historia Wambae by Julian of Toledo, all works that would have existed in the Visigothic libraries of seventh century Toledo and whose existence together "makes more sense in a Toledan context than in any other."

In 756 Abd ar-Rahman, a descendant of the fallen Umayyad caliphs, came to Al-Andalus and initiated a revolt against Yusuf. He defeated Yusuf and forced him to reside in Cordoba, but Yusuf broke the agreement and raised a Berber army to fight Abd ar-Rahman. In this conflict, Toledo was held against Abd ar-Rahman by Yusuf's cousin Hisham ibn Urwa. Yusuf attempted to march on Seville, but was defeated and instead attempted to reach his cousin in Toledo. He was either killed on his way to Toledo, or he reached Toledo and held out there for as many as two or three years before being betrayed and killed by his own people. Whether or not Yusuf himself held out in Toledo, Hisham ibn Urwa did hold power in Toledo for several years, resisting the authority of Abd ar-Rahman. In 761 Hisham is reported as again being in rebellion in Toledo against Abd ar-Rahman. Abd ar-Rahman failed to take Toledo by force and instead signed a treaty allowing Hisham to remain in control of Toledo, but giving one of his sons as hostage to Abd ar-Rahman. Hisham continued to defy Abd ar-Rahman, who had Hisham's son executed and the head catapulted over the city walls into Toledo. Abd ar-Rahman attacked Toledo in 764, winning only when some of Hisham's own people betrayed him and turned him over to Abd ar-Rahman and his freedman Badr. Ibn al-Athir states that towards the end of Abd ar-Rahman's reign, a governor of Toledo raided in force into the Kingdom of Asturias during the reign of Mauregatus, though the Asturian chronicles do not record the event.

Under the Umayyad Emirate of Cordoba, Toledo was the centre of numerous insurrections dating from 761 to 857. Twenty years after the rebellion of Hisham ibn Urwa, the last of Yusuf's sons, Abu al-Aswad ibn Yusuf, rebelled in Toledo in 785. After the suppression of ibn Yusuf's revolt, Abd ar-Rahman's oldest son Sulayman was made governor of Toledo. However, Abd ar-Rahman designated as his successor a younger son, Hisham. On Hisham's accession to the Emirate in 788, Sulayman refused to make the oath of allegiance at the mosque, as succession custom would have dictated, and thus declared himself in rebellion. He was joined in Toledo by his brother Abdallah. Hisham laid siege to Toledo. While Abdallah held Toledo against Hisham, Sulayman escaped and attempted to find support elsewhere, but was unsuccessful. In 789, Abdallah submitted and Hisham took control of Toledo. The following year, Sulayman gave up the fight and went into exile. Hisham's son Al-Hakam was governor of Toledo from 792 to 796 when he succeeded his father as emir in Cordoba.

After Al-Hakam's accession and departure, a poet resident in Toledo named Girbib ibn-Abdallah wrote verses against the Umayyads, helping to inspire a revolt in Toledo against the new emir in 797. Chroniclers disagree as to the leader of this revolt, though Ibn Hayyan states that it was led by Ibn Hamir. Al-Hakam sent Amrus ibn Yusuf to fight the rebellion. Amrus took control of the Berber troops in Talavera. From there, Amrus negotiated with a faction inside Toledo called the Banu Mahsa, promising to make them governors if they would betray Ibn Hamir. The Banu Mahsa brought Ibn Hamir's head to Amrus at Talavera, but instead of making them governors, Amrus executed them. Amrus now persuaded the remaining factions in Toledo to submit to him. Once he entered Toledo, he invited the leaders to a celebratory feast. As they entered Amrus' fortress, the guests were beheaded one by one and their bodies thrown in a specially dug ditch. The massacre was thus called "The Day of the Ditch." Amrus' soldiers killed about 700 people that day. Amrus was governor of Toledo until 802.

"In 785, Bishop Elipandus of Toledo wrote a letter condemning the teaching of a certain Migetius." In his letter, Elipandus asserted that Christ had adopted his humanity, a position that came to be known as Adoptionism. Two Asturian bishops, Beatus and Eterius, bishop of Osma, wrote a treatise condemning Elipandus' views. Pope Hadrian wrote a letter between 785 and 791 in which he condemned Migetius, but also the terminology used by Elipandus. The Frankish court of Charlemagne also condemned Adoptionism at the Synod of Frankfurt in 794. Although Ramon Abadals y de Vinyals argued that this controversy represented an ideological assertion of independence by the Asturian church against the Moslem-ruled church of Toledo, Collins believes this argument applies eleventh century ideology to the eighth century and is anachronistic. However, Collins notes that the controversy and the alliances formed during it between Asturias and the Franks broke the old unity of the Spanish church. The influence of the bishops of Toledo would be much more limited until the eleventh century.

By the end of the 700s, the Umayyads had created three frontier districts stretching out from the southern core of their Iberian territories. These were called the Lower March (al-Tagr al-Adna), Central March (al-Tagr al-Awsat), and Upper March (al-Tagr al-A'la). Toledo became the administrative center of the Central March, while Merida became the center of the Lower March and Zaragoza of the Upper March.

Following the death of Abd al-Rahman II, a new revolt broke out in Toledo. The Umayyad governor was held hostage in order to secure the return of Toledan hostages held in Córdoba. Toledo now engaged in an inter-city feud with the nearby city of Calatrava la Vieja. Toledan soldiers attacked Calatrava, destroyed the walls, and massacred or expelled many inhabitants of Calatrava in 853. Soldiers from Cordoba came to restore the walls and protect Calatrava from Toledo. The new emir, Muhammad I, sent a second army to attack the Toledans, but was defeated. Toledo now made an alliance with King Ordoño I of Asturias. The Toledans and Asturians were defeated at the Battle of Guadacelete, with sources claiming 8000 Toledan and Asturian soldiers were killed and their heads sent back to Cordoba for display throughout Al-Andalus. Despite this defeat, Toledo did not surrender to Cordoba. The Umayyads reinforced nearby fortresses with cavalry forces to try to contain the Toledans. Toledans attacked Talavera in 857, but were again defeated. In 858 emir Muhammad I personally led an expedition against Toledo and destroyed a bridge, but was unable to take the city. In 859, Muhammad I negotiated a truce with Toledo. Toledo became virtually independent for twenty years, though locked in conflict with neighboring cities. Muhammad I recovered control of Toledo in 873, when he successfully besieged the city and forced it to submit.

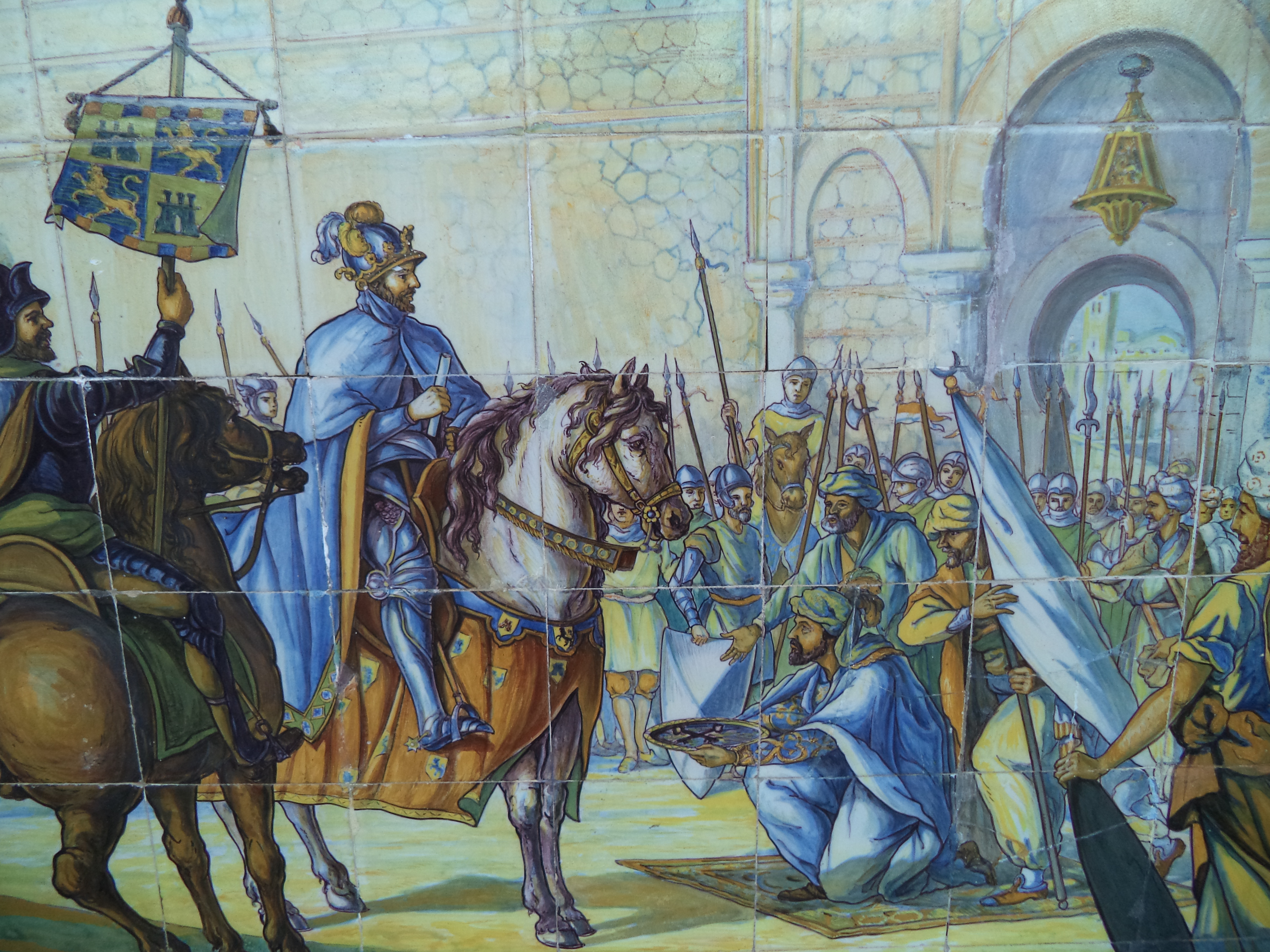
Azulejo in Seville's Plaza de España despicting the conquest of Toledo in 1085.

The Banu Qasi gained nominal control of the city until 920 and in 932 Abd-ar-Rahman III captured the city following an extensive siege. According to the Chronicle of Alfonso III, Musa ibn Musa of the Banu Qasi had, partly by war and partly by strategy, made himself master of Zaragoza, Tudela, Huesca, and Toledo. He had installed his son Lupus (Lubb) as governor of Toledo. King Ordoño I of Asturias fought a series of battles with Musa ibn Musa. According to the Chronicle, Musa ibn Musa allied with his brother-in-law Garcia, identified as Garcia Iñiquez, King of Pamplona. Ordoño defeated Musa's forces at the Battle of Monte Laturce. Musa died of injuries, and his son Lubb submitted to Ordoño's authority in 862 or 863, for the duration of Ordoño's reign (up to 866). Thus, according to the Chronicle of Alfonso III, Toledo was ruled by the Asturian kings. However, Arabic sources do not confirm these campaigns, instead stating that Musa ibn Musa was killed in a failed attack on Guadalajara, and that Andalusi forces repeatedly defeated Asturian forces in the area of Alava from 862 to 866.

By the 870s the Umayyads had regained control over Toledo. In 878 Al-Mundhir led an expedition against Asturias, of which one of the main components was a force from Toledo. One source portrays this raid as an attack by the 'King of Toledo', but other sources portray it as an Umayyad raid involving substantial Toledan forces. The forces from Toledo were defeated by Alfonso III of Asturias at the Battle of Polvoraria. Spanish chronicles state that twelve to thirteen thousand in the Toledo army were killed in the battle. Collins states that these figures are "totally unreliable" but demonstrate that Asturian chroniclers thought of this as an important and decisive battle.

In 920s and 930s, the governors of Toledo were in rebellion against the Umayyad regime in Cordoba, led by Abd al-Rahman III. In 930, Abd al-Rahman III, having now adopted the title of caliph, attacked Toledo. The governor of Toledo asked for help from King Ramiro II of Leon, but Ramiro was preocuppied with a civil war against his brother Alfonso IV and was unable to help. In 932, Abd al-Rahman III conquered Toledo, re-establishing control of al-Tagr al-Awsat, the Central March of the Umayyad state.

In 1009 one of the last Umayyad caliphs, Muhammad II al-Mahdi, fled to Toledo after being expelled from Cordoba by Berber forces backing the rival claimant Sulayman. Al-Mahdi and his Siqlabi general Wadih formed an alliance with the Count of Barcelona and his brother the Count of Urgell. These Catalans joined with Wadih and al-Mahdi in Toledo in 1010 and marched on Cordoba. The combination of Wadih's army and the Catalans defeated the Berbers in a battle outside Cordoba in 1010.

After the fall of the Umayyad caliphate in the early 11th century, Toledo became an independent taifa kingdom. The population of Toledo at this time was about 28 thousand, including a Jewish population estimated at 4 thousand. The Mozarab community had its own Christian bishop, and after the Christian conquest of Toledo, the city was a destination for Mozarab immigration from the Muslim south. The taifa of Toledo was centered on the Tajo River. The border with the taifa of Badajoz was on the Tajo between Talavera de la Reina and Coria. North, the border was the Sierra de Guadarrama. Northeast, Toledo lands stretched past Guadalajara to Medinaceli. Southeast was the border with the taifa of Valencia, in La Mancha between Cuenca and Albacete. South were the borders with Badajoz around the Mountains of Toledo.

In 1062, Fernando I of Leon and Castile attacked the taifa of Toledo. He conquered Talamanca de Jarama and besieged Alcala de Henares. To secure Fernando's withdrawal, king al-Mamun of Toledo agreed to pay an annual tribute, or parias, to Fernando. Three years later in 1065, al-Mamun invaded the taifa of Valencia through La Mancha, successfully conquering it. Toledo controlled the taifa of Valencia until al-Mamun's death in 1075.

After the death of Fernando I in 1065, the kingdom of Leon and Castilla was divided in three: the kingdoms of Galicia, Leon, and Castilla. The parias that had been paid by Toledo to Fernando I were assigned to the Kingdom of León, which was inherited by Alfonso VI. However, in 1071, Alfonso's older brother Sancho II invaded Leon and defeated his younger brother. Alfonso VI was allowed to go into exile with al-Mamun in Toledo. Alfonso VI was in exile in Toledo approximately from June to October 1071, but after Sancho II was killed later in the same year, Alfonso left Toledo and returned to Leon. Some sources state that al-Mamun forced Alfonso to swear support for al-Mamun and his heirs before allowing him to leave.

In 1074, Alfonso VI campaigned against the taifa of Granada with the assistance of al-Mamun of Toledo. Alfonso received troops from al-Mamun in addition to the parias payment, facilitating his military campaigns. The campaign was successful, and Granada was forced to begin parias payments to Alfonso VI. After this, al-Mamun proceeded to attack Cordoba, which was then under the control of his enemy al-Mutamid, taifa king of Sevilla. He conquered Cordoba in January 1075.

The parias of Toledo to Alfonso VI in the 1070s amounted to approximately 12 thousand gold dinars. This money contributed strongly to Alfonso VI's ability to project military strength throughout the Iberian peninsula.

In 1076, al-Mamun of Toledo was killed in the city of Cordoba, which he had conquered only the year before. The taifa king of Sevilla took the opportunity to reconquer Cordoba and seize other territory on the borderlands between the taifas of Sevilla and Toledo. Al-Mamun was succeeded by his son, al-Qadir, the last taifa king of Toledo. Possibly keeping an earlier promise to al-Mamun, Alfonso VI at first supported the succession of al-Qadir. The taifa of Valencia, which had been conquered by al-Mamun, revolted against al-Qadir and ceased parias payments to Toledo.

Taking advantage of al-Qadir's weakness, al-Mutamid of Sevilla took lands in La Mancha from the taifa of Toledo, and from there conquered the taifas of Valencia and Denia in 1078. After this, al-Qadir lost popularity in Toledo. There was a revolt against him, and he was forced to flee the city and appeal to Alfonso VI for help. The rebels invited the king of Badajoz, al-Mutawakkil, to rule Toledo. The king of Badajoz occupied Toledo in 1079, but Alfonso VI sent forces to help al-Qadir recover Toledo. Alfonso captured the fortress town of Coria, which controlled a pass from Castilian lands into the lands of the taifa of Badajoz. Since Alfonso now threatened him through Coria, al-Mutawakkil withdrew from Toledo and al-Qadir was able to return to Toledo. As the price of his help, Alfonso obtained the right to station two garrisons of his soldiers on the lands of Toledo, at al-Qadir's expense.

A second revolt against al-Qadir took place in 1082. This time al-Qadir defeated the rebels in Toledo, chased them to Madrid, and defeated them there. It was about this time at the latest that Alfonso VI decided to seize Toledo for himself, though some authors have argued that the plan to conquer Toledo existed by 1078. In 1083, Alfonso VI campaigned against al-Mutamid, bringing his forces right up against Sevilla and reaching the city of Tarifa, with the intention of dissuading al-Mutamid from any resistance against the coming seizure of Toledo. In 1084, Alfonso set siege to Toledo, preventing the city from being supplied and also preventing agricultural work in the area. Over the winter of 1084 to 1085 the siege was maintained, while the king spent the winter north in Leon and Sahagun. In spring 1085 Alfonso personally rejoined the siege with new forces. The city soon fell and Alfonso made his triumphant entry to the city on May 24, 1085.

Toledo experienced a period known as La Convivencia, i.e. the co-existence of Jews, Christians, and Muslims. Under Islamic Arab rule, Toledo was called Ṭulayṭulah. After the fall of the caliphate, Toledo was the capital city of one of the richest Taifas of Al-Andalus. Its population was overwhelmingly Muwallad, and, because of its central location in the Iberian Peninsula, Toledo took a central position in the struggles between the Muslim and Christian rulers of northern Spain. The conquest of Toledo by Alfonso VI of Castile in 1085 marked the first time a major city in Al-Andalus was captured by Christian forces; it served to sharpen the religious aspect of the Christian reconquest.

== Toledo under Castilian rule ==
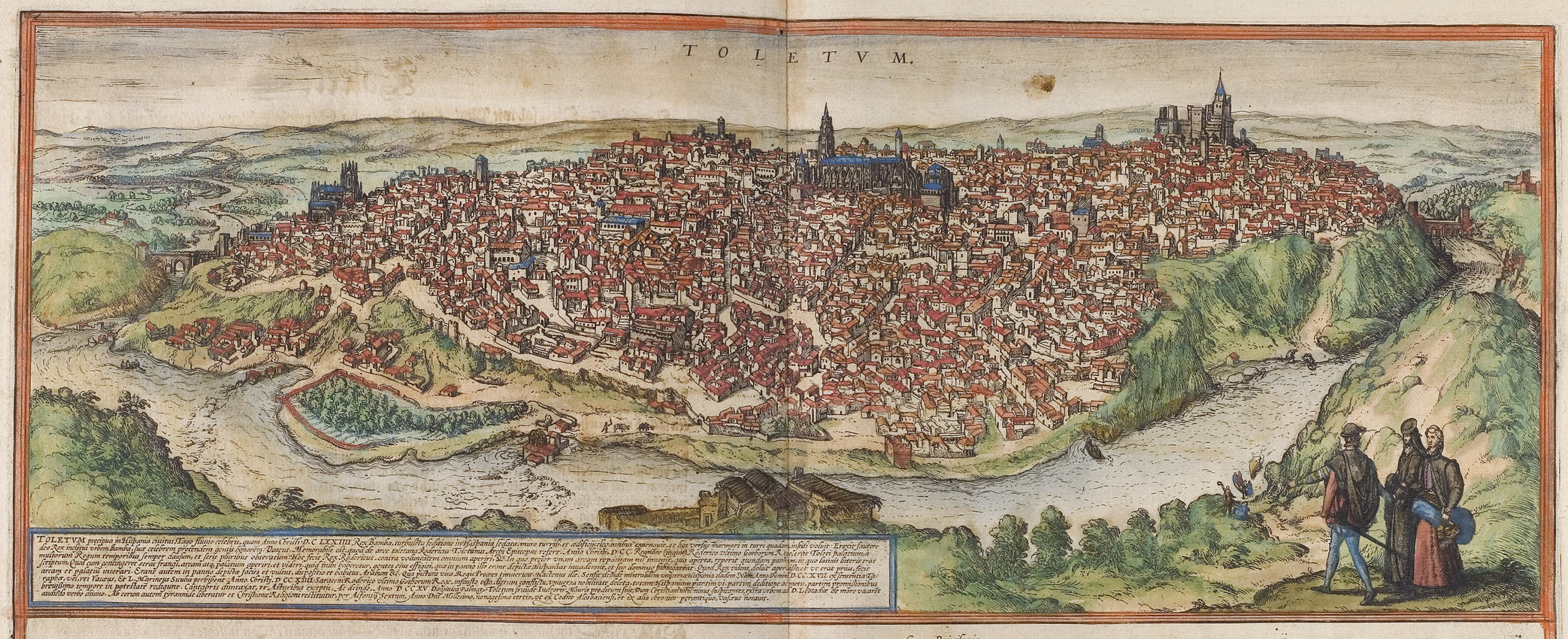
Toledo in the 16th century

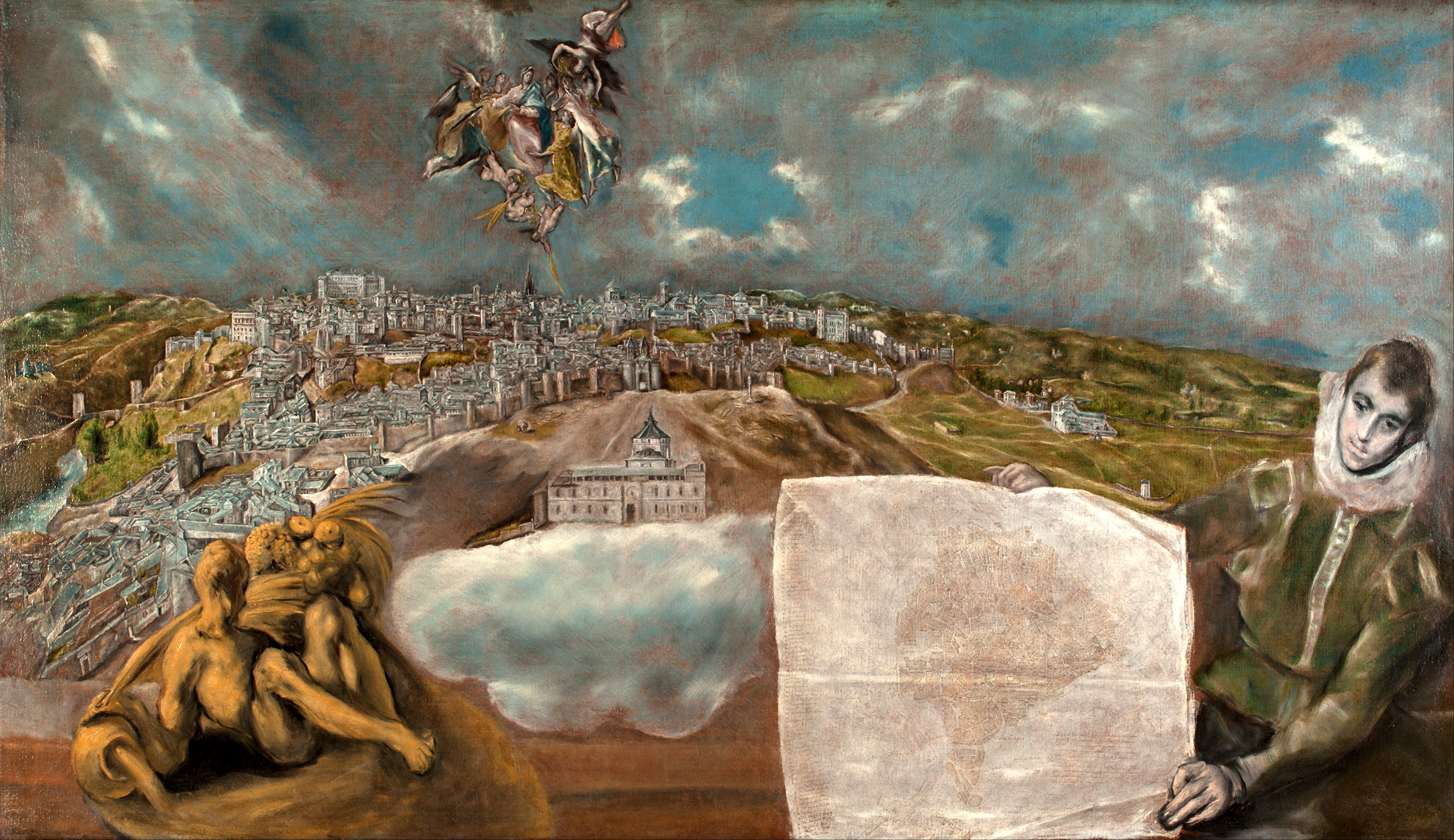
View of Toledo by resident El Greco c. 1608.

On May 25, 1085, Alfonso VI of Castile took Toledo and established direct personal control over the Moorish city from which he had been exacting tribute, ending the medieval Taifa's Kingdom of Toledo. This was the first concrete step taken by the combined kingdom of Leon-Castile in the Reconquista by Christian forces. After Castilian conquest, Toledo continued to be a major cultural centre; its Arab libraries were not pillaged, and a translation centre was established in which books in Arabic or Hebrew would be translated into Castilian by Muslim and Jewish scholars, and from Castilian into Latin by Castilian scholars, thus letting long-lost knowledge spread through Christian Europe again. Toledo served as the capital city of Castile intermittently (Castile did not have a permanent capital) from 1085, and the city flourished. Charles I of Spain's court was set in Toledo, serving as the imperial capital. However, in 1561, in the first years of his son Philip II of Spain reign, the Spanish court was moved to Madrid, thus letting the city's importance dwindle until the late 20th century, when it became the capital of the autonomous community of Castile–La Mancha. Nevertheless, the economic decline of the city helped to preserve its cultural and architectural heritage. Today, because of this rich heritage, Toledo is one of Spain's foremost cities, receiving thousands of visitors yearly.

During the persecution of the Jews in the late 15th and early 16th centuries, members of the Jewish community of Toledo produced texts on their long history in Toledo. It was at this time that Don Isaac Abrabanel, a prominent Jewish figure in Spain in the 15th century and one of the king's trusted courtiers who witnessed the expulsion of Jews from Spain in 1492, wrote that Toledo was named Ṭulayṭulah by its first Jewish inhabitants who, he stated, settled there in the 5th century BCE, and which name – by way of conjecture – may have been related to its Hebrew cognate טלטול (= wandering), on account of their wandering from Jerusalem. He says, furthermore, that the original name of the city was Pirisvalle, so-called by its early pagan inhabitants. However, there is no archaeological or historical evidence for Jewish presence in this region prior to the time of the Roman Empire; when the Romans first wrote about Toledo it was a Celtic city.

== Modern Era ==
Toledo's Alcázar (Latinized Arabic word for palace-castle, from the Arabic القصر, al-qasr) became renowned in the 19th and 20th centuries as a military academy. At the outbreak of the Spanish Civil War in 1936, its garrison was famously besieged by Republican forces.

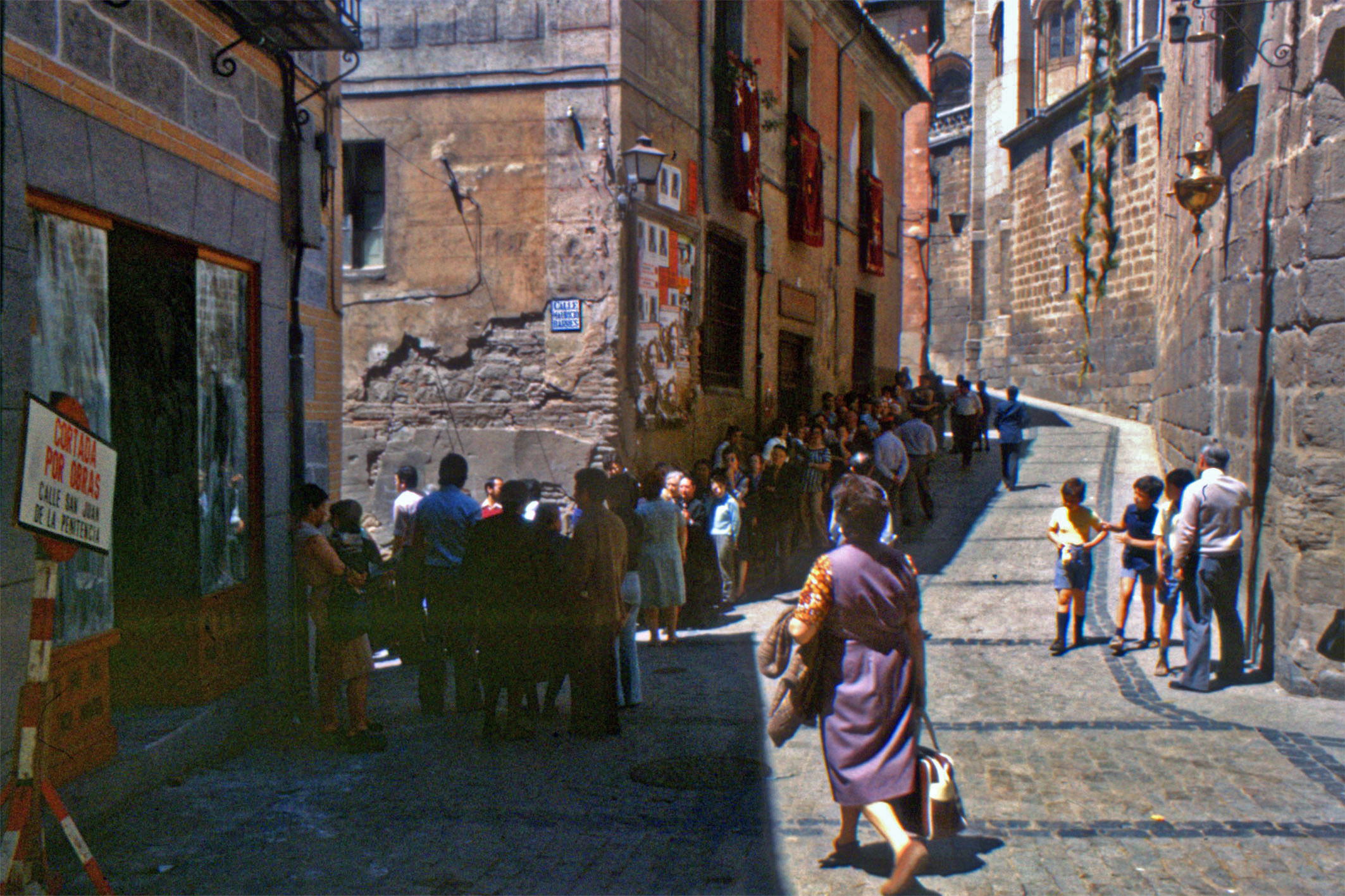
Spanish general election of 1977 in Toledo, the first after the dictatorship.

== Population ==
| Date | Population |
|---|---|
| c. 1200 | 37,000 |
| 1503 | 25,000 |
| 1528 | 31,120 |
| c. 1530 | 38,000 |
| 1561 | 59,405 |
| 1569 | 53,770 |
| 1571 | 54,488 |
| 1574 | 53,961 |
| 1587 | 55,766 |
| 1591 | 52,680 |
| 1597 | 47,065 |

== See also ==
- Timeline of Toledo, Spain
