= Eighteenth Council of Toledo =

Final council of Toledo, Visigothic Spain

The Eighteenth Council of Toledo was the last of the councils of Toledo held in Visigothic Spain before the Moorish conquest of 711. It was held after the Seventeenth Council in 694, probably in 703 during the reign of King Wittiza (701–710) or his co-reign with his father, Ergica, from 693. It was presided over by Gunderic, Archbishop of Toledo.

An account of the acts of the council existed in the Middle Ages, but has since been lost; it may have been highly controversial, leading to its suppression. There is a reference in the Chronicle of 754 to Wittiza commanding Sindered to exert pressure on the established clergy, but what exactly this means is unknown. It may mean that he pressured the Eighteenth Council to ratify the decision of the Quinisext Council that clerical marriage was permissible: according to the Chronicle of Alfonso III, Fruela I of Asturias (757–68) reversed this ruling. The collective sense is that Wittiza made an effort to reform corruptions in the Visigothic Catholic Church.

== Sources ==
- Collins, Roger, Visigothic Spain, 409–711, Blackwell Publishing, 2004.
- Thompson, E. A., The Goths in Spain, Clarendon Press: Oxford, 1969.
- Martínez Diez, Gonzalo, La colección canónica Hispana, Madrid, 1966.
