= Witica =

Witica may refer to:

- Wittiza (c. 687 – probably 710), Visigothic King of Hispania
- Witica (spider), a spider genus in the family Araneidae
