= Ibn al-Qutiyya =

Andalusian historian and Philologist at Al-Hakam II's court

Abu Bakr Muhammad ibn Umar ibn Abd al-Aziz ibn Ibrahim ibn Isa ibn Muzahim
- محمد ابن عمر ابن عبد العزيز ابن إبراهيم ابن عيسى ابن مزاحم
- Born: 10th century Seville, Umayyad Caliphate of Córdoba (now Spain)
- Died: 6 November 977; Córdoba, Umayyad Caliphate of Córdoba (now Spain)
- Occupations: Historian, Philologist

Academic work
- Era: Islamic Golden Age
- Main interests: History, Philology
- Notable works: Ta'rikh iftitāḥ al-Andalus (History of the Conquest of al-Andalus)
- Notable ideas: Detailed accounts of the Islamic conquest of Spain

Ibn al-Qūṭiyya (ابن القوطية, died 6 November 977), born Muḥammad Ibn ʿUmar Ibn ʿAbd al-ʿAzīz ibn ʾIbrāhīm ibn ʿIsā ibn Muzāḥim (محمد ابن عمر ابن عبد العزيز ابن إبراهيم ابن عيسى ابن مزاحم), also known as Abu Bakr or al-Qurtubi ("the Córdoban"), was an Andalusian historian and considered the greatest philologist at the Umayyad court of caliph Al-Hakam II. His magnum opus, the History of the Conquest of al-Andalus, is one of the earliest Arabic Muslim accounts of the Islamic conquest of Spain.

== Life ==
Ibn al-Qūṭiyya, whose name means "son of the Gothic woman", claimed descent from Wittiza, the last king of the united Visigoths in Spain, through a granddaughter, Sara al-Qutiyya, who travelled to Damascus and married ʿĪsā ibn Muzāḥim, an Arab client of the 10th Umayyad caliph Hisham. Sara and ʿĪsā then returned to Al-Andalus.

Ibn al-Qūṭiyya was born and raised in Seville. His family was under the patronage of the Qurayshi tribe, and his father was a qāḍī (judge) in Seville and Écija. The Banu Hajjaj, also of Seville, were close relatives of his family, also claiming descent from Visigothic royalty. Ibn al-Qūṭiyya's student al-Faraḍī composed a short sketch of his master for his biographical dictionary, preserved in a late medieval manuscript discovered in Tunis in 1887. Al-Faraḍī tells us Ibn al-Qūṭiyya studied first in Seville, (Note: His teachers there were: Muḥammad ibn ʿAbd Allāh ibn al-Qarn, Ḥasan ibn ʿAbd Allāh al-Zabārī, Saʿīd ibn Jābr, and ʿAlī ibn Abī Shība.) then in Córdoba. (Note: His teachers there were: Tāhir ibn ʿAbd al-Azīz, Ibn Abī al-Walīd al-Arj, Muḥammad ibn ʿAbd al-Wahāb ibn Mughīth, Muḥammad ibn ʿUmar ibn Lubāba, ʿUmar ibn Ḥafṣ ibn Abī Tamīm, Aslam ibn ʿAbd al-ʿAzīz, Aḥmad ibn Jild, Muḥammad ibn Masūr, Muḥammad ibn ʿAbd al-Malik ibn Ayman, ʿAbd Allāh ibn Yūnis, Aḥmad ibn Bashīr ibn al-Aghbas, and Qasīm ibn Aṣbagh.) Al-Faraḍī cautions that Qūṭiyya's histories were tales(akhbār), and not serious history(ta'rīkh). Under Saʿīd ibn Qāhir he studied, memorized and transmitted the great work of history known as Al-Kāmil (The Complete) by the famous Baṣriyyan philologist, al-Mubarrad. He died in old age at Córdoba.

Al-Qūṭiyya's highly anecdotal history is unusual among the Arab chronicles. The influence of his royal ancestry probably lies behind his defense of treaties between the Arab Muslim conquerors and the Gothic aristocracy—both secular and ecclesiastical— that preserved them on their estates. Al-Qūṭiyya contests criticisms by historians such as Ahmad ibn Muhammad ibn Musa al-Razi, arguing that these treaties bolstered Islamic hegemony at minimal military cost. He refutes a claim that the Umayyad emirs of Córdoba retained the fifth (quinto or khums, a tax) for the Caliph of Damascus. His history retells the legend of the part played by "the sons of Wittiza" at the Battle of Guadalete.

== Works ==
- Ta'rikh iftitāḥ al-Andalus (تاريخ افتتاح الأندلس), 'History of the Conquest of al-Andalus'; found in only a single extant manuscript, Bibliothèque Nationale de France No. 1867. Speculation about a copy's existence among the rich manuscript collection at Constantine, Algeria, of Si Hamouda ben Cheikh el-Fakoun, seems unlikely according to recent scholarship. The 18-volume history was written at the height of the Umayyad Caliphate of al-Andalus and spans its first 250 years. Ibn al-Quṭīyya treats of lives of Christians, Jews and Muslim converts, and in addition to accounts of rulers are intrigues among servants, minor officials, poets, judges, concubines and physicians.
  - Taʼrīj iftitāḥ al-Andalus, critical transcript of the unique manuscript edited by P. de Gayangos (with collaboration by E. Saavedra and F. Codera), 1868.
  - Historia de la conquista de España de Aben al-Cotia el cordobés, seguida de fragmentos históricos de Abencotaiba (y la noble carta dirigida a las comarcas españolas del wazīr al-Gassānī), Spanish translation by Julián Ribera, Madrid, 1926.
  - Early Islamic Spain: the History of Ibn al-Qūṭīya, English translation by David James, Routledge, 2009.
- Kitāb Taṣārīf al-af’āl, ('Book on the Conjugation of Verbs')—The oldest MS of an Arabic dictionary extant.
- Kitāb al-Maqṣūr wa 'l-Mamdūd ('Book on the Shortened and Extended Alif').—This title is mentioned by al-Faraḍī but no copy survives.

== Bibliography ==
- Barton, Simon (2015). Conquerors, Brides, and Concubines: Interfaith Relations and Social Power in Medieval Iberia. University of Pennsylvania Press.
- Christys, Ann (2002). Christians in al-Andalus (711–1000). London: Routledge. ISBN 9780700715640. OCLC 474323475.
- Collins, Roger (1989). The Arab Conquest of Spain, 710–97. London: Blackwell Publishing. ISBN 9780631159230. OCLC 898276874.
- James, David; Ibn 'Umar Ibn al-Qūṭīyah, Muhammad (2009). Early Islamic Spain: The History of Ibn al-Qutiya: A Study of the Unique Arabic Manuscript in the Bibliotheque Nationale de France, Paris. London: Routledge. ISBN 9780415475525. OCLC 241304594.
- Nichols, James Manfield (1975). The History of the Conquest of Al-Andulus by Ibn al Qútiyya. PhD dissertation. University of North Carolina, Chapel Hill.
