= Politics of Toledo (Spain) =

The city of Toledo, Spain is the seat of government of the Province of Toledo and the autonomous region of Castilla-La Mancha.

== Regional politics ==
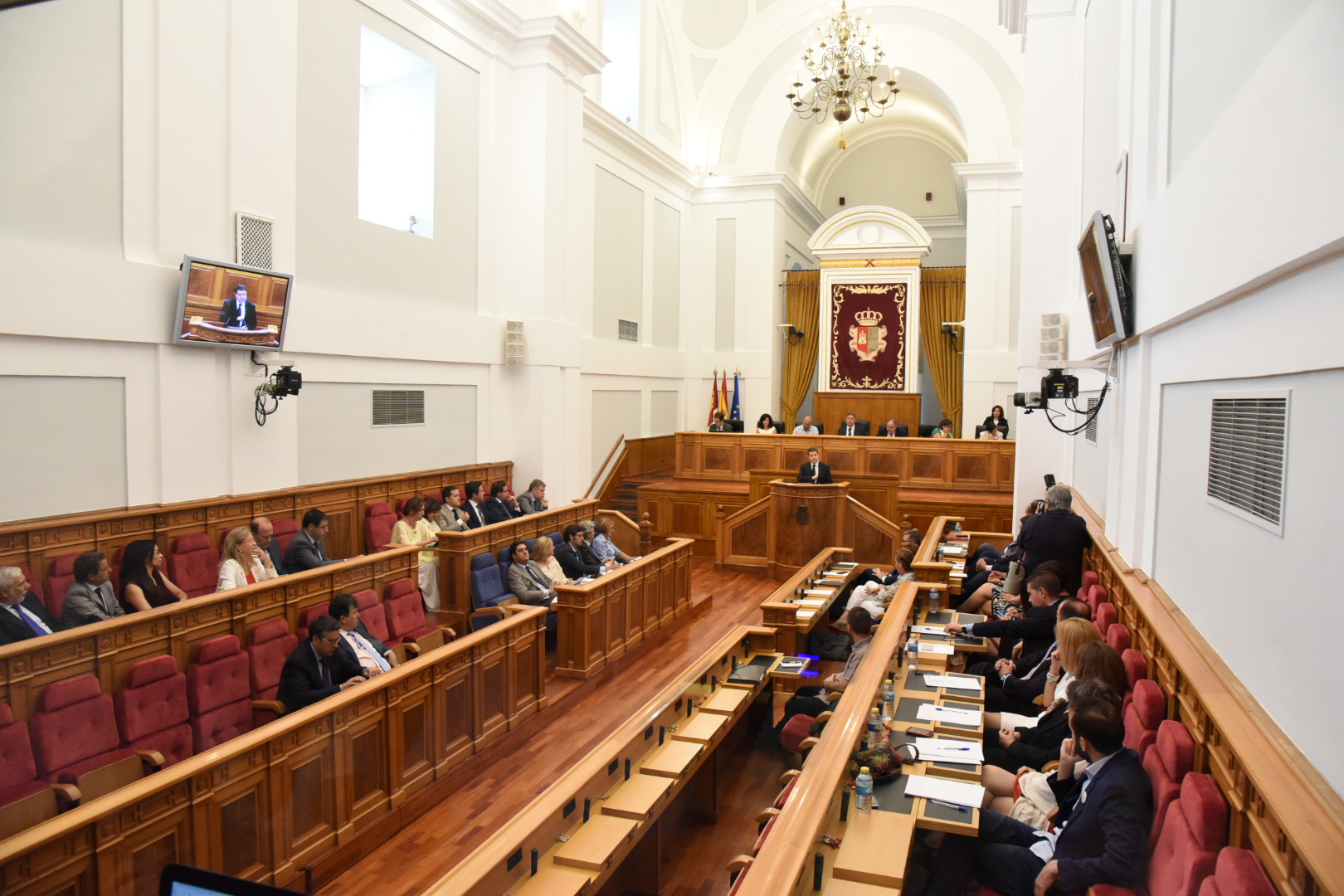
Plenary hall of the regional legislature

Toledo has been the capital of the Autonomous Community of Castilla-La Mancha since 1983, after a vote in which it won the support of 22 Spanish Socialist Workers' Party (PSOE) deputies and five People's Party (PP) deputies. As the capital, it is the seat of the regional parliament, the Cortes of Castilla-La Mancha, located in the Convento de San Gil, and the presidential office, located in the Palacio de Fuensalida.

For regional elections Toledo city forms a constituency with the rest of the province. Eleven seats out of the total of 47 members are allocated to the province. In the latest elections, held in 2007, the PSOE won six seats and the PP five. The PSOE has always won in the district of Toledo, although in the municipal elections for Toledo held at the same time as the regional elections of 2007, the victory went to the PP, which obtained 46.38% of the vote.

Apart from the PSOE and the PP (formerly AP), the Democratic and Social Centre (CDS) has achieved parliamentary representation for Toledo, one seat in 1987.

== Provincial politics ==
The city is the seat of the Diputación Provincial de Toledo. The council is composed of provincial deputies to be mayors or council members. The constituencies are the six judicial districts, thus part of the city of Toledo's namesake judicial district, with 23 other municipalities. Currently, the PSOE has 14 provincial deputies, and the PP 13. In the city's district ten deputies are elected, the last election returned five for the PSOE and five for the PP.

== Municipal politics ==
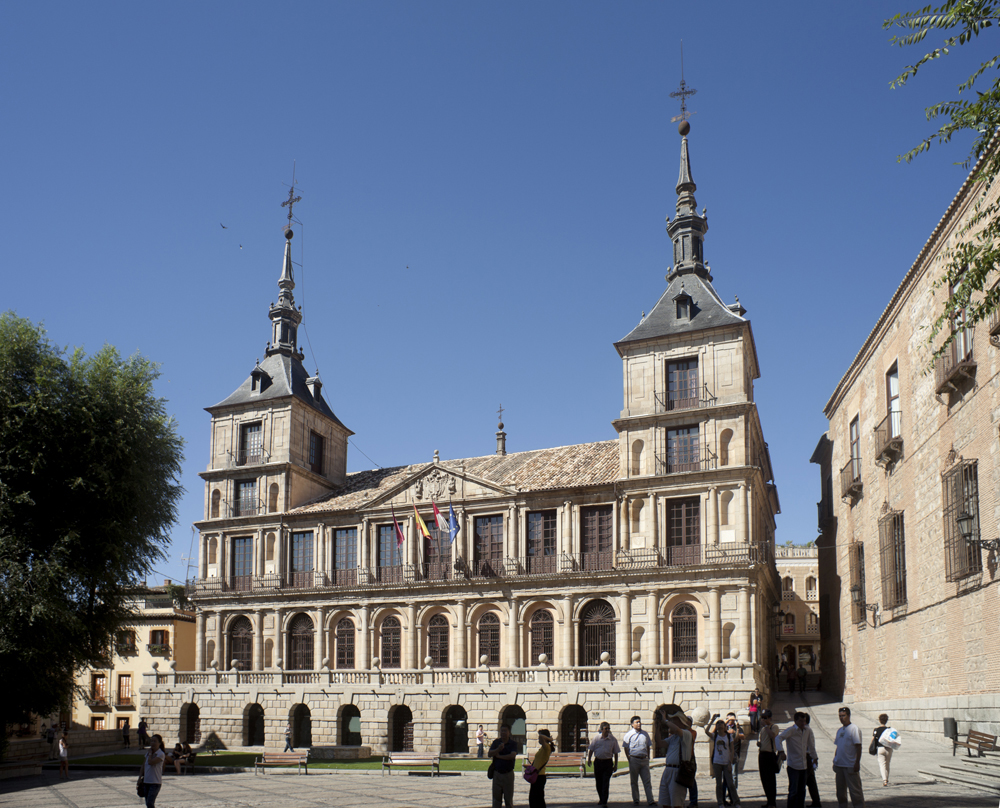
Toledo City Hall.

The city administration for the City Council is composed of 25 councilors elected by universal suffrage every four years with closed lists. Five parties submitted lists for the most recent election: the People's Party (PP, headed by former mayor José Manuel Molina), the Spanish Socialist Workers' Party (PSOE, led by Vice President of the Junta de Comunidades de Castilla-La Mancha and current mayor, Emiliano García-Page), the United Left (IU, led by Aurelio San Emeterio), Spanish Democratic Party and earth Commoners. The first three parties won representation: 12 for the PP, eleven for the PSOE and two for the IU. The PSOE and IU made a pact to govern, and the PSOE's Emiliano Garcia-Page became mayor.

=== Political history ===
The first democratic elections in 1979 were won by the Union of the Democratic Centre (UCD) with 11 seats. The PSOE won 7, the Spanish Communist Party (PCE) 5, and the Democratic Coalition and the New Forces one. A coalition government formed, with Juan Ignacio de Mesa of the UCD as mayor. In the second election, held in 1983, only three parties won representation due to the dissolution of the UCD (PSOE 11, CD 11 and PCE 3), although initially the Popular Democratic Party won two council independently, then formed a group with People's Alliance. The mayoralty passed to the PSOE's Joaquín Sánchez Garrido, who ruled in coalition with the PCE.

In 1987, People's Alliance (later known as People's Party) won the election with 12 council members, while the PSOE led by Candelas Ricardo Sanchez dropped to 8 councilors. The PCE, which had become the United Left, could not improve their performance, retaining three councilmen. In addition, the Democratic and Social Centre (CDS), had two councillors elected, who made a coalition with the People's Alliance, allowing Jose Manuel Molina Garcia to become mayor. Since 1991, when the CSD disappeared, Toledo's council has never had more than three parties. Those elections were won by the PP, but the PSOE's Garrido Sanchez became mayor in coalition with the United Left. In 1995, the PP, led by Agustin Conde Bajen, became the first party to get the majority of votes and seats.

For the elections of 1999, José Manuel Molina was again the candidate of the PP since Conde was presented to the regional elections. The PSOE was led by Moltó Juan Pedro Hernandez, national deputy for the province. Remarkable about this election is that the PSOE was presented under the name Progressive PSOE-led by the agreement left out of Castilla-La Mancha-Nueva Izquierda, Izquierda Unida division forming part of the two councilors who scored in that game 1995. The elections the PP again won the absolute majority, but lost more than 1,200 votes over previous elections. The PSOE won a seat their party, Izquierda Unida lost, badly weakened after the split. In 2003 he repeated the same results, being the first mayor of Toledo Molina in being two consecutive terms in office, this time defeating Alejandro Alonso Núñez.

== List of mayors since the democratic elections of 1979 ==
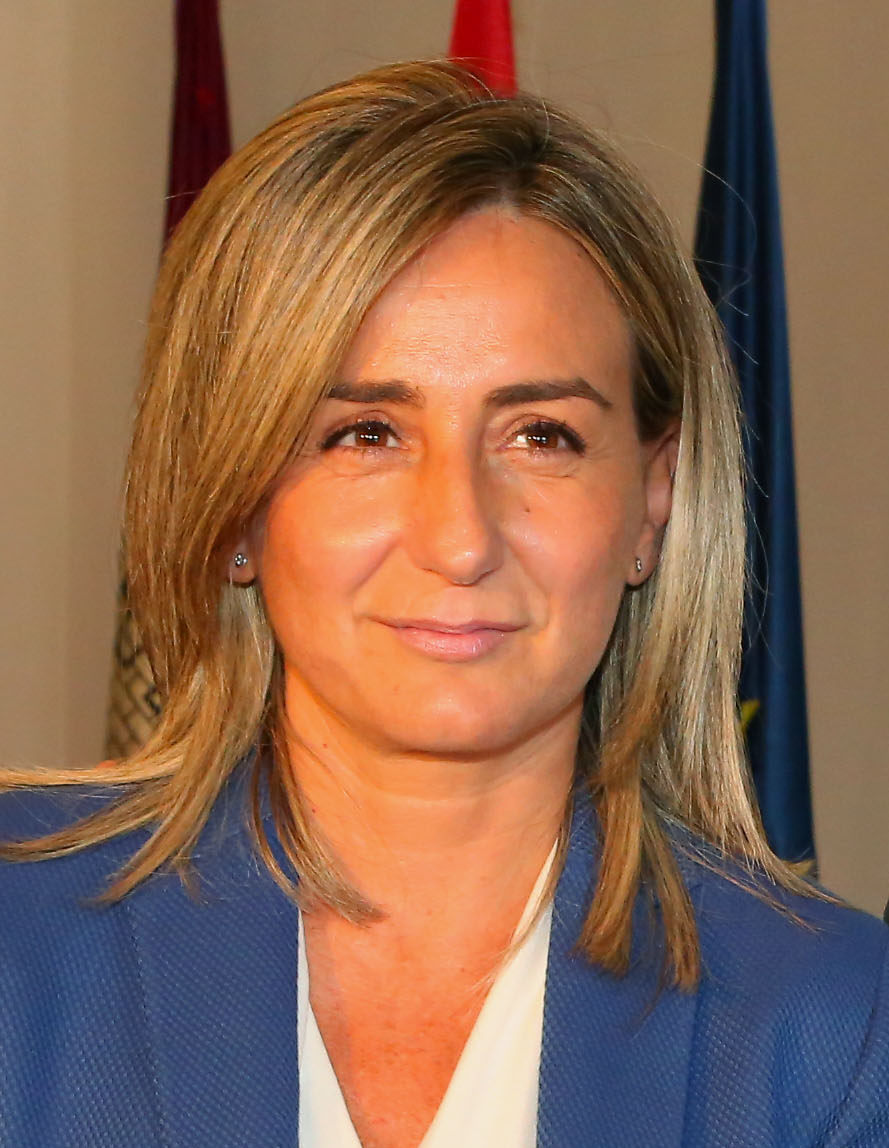
Milagros Tolón, Mayor of Toledo (PSOE, 2015-2023).

- Juan Ignacio de Mesa Ruiz (UCD, 1979–1983)
- Joaquín Sánchez Garrido (PSOE, 1983–1987)
- José Manuel Molina García (PP, 1987–1991)
- Joaquín Sánchez Garrido (PSOE, 1991–1995)
- Agustín Conde Bajén (PP, 1995–1999)
- José Manuel Molina García (PP, 1999–2007)
- Emiliano García-Page Sánchez (PSOE, 2007–2015)
- Milagros Tolón Jaime (PSOE, 2015–2023)
- Carlos Velázquez Romo (PP, since 2023)

== See also ==
- Timeline of Toledo, Spain
