= Witiza =

Witiza can refer to:

- Wittiza (c. 687 – 710), the Visigothic King of Hispania from 694
- Benedict of Aniane (c. 747 – 821), saint born in France
