= Timeline of Toledo, Spain =

The following is a timeline of the history of the city of Toledo, Spain.

== Prior to 20th century ==
- 193 CE – Settlement becomes part of the Roman Empire.
- 250-300 – Roman Catholic diocese of Toledo established. Population: 15,000
- 397-400 – Religious Council of Toledo held.
- 554 – Toledo becomes capital of the Visigothic Kingdom of Toledo (approximate date).
- 589 – Religious Council of Toledo held. Population: 10,000
- 712 – Muslims in power; city renamed "Tolaitola."
- 999 – Bib Mardum Mosque built.
- 1085 – Christian Alfonso VI of León and Castile takes Toledo.
- 1088 – Toledo archbishop becomes Primate of Spain.
- 1102 – Puerta del Cambrón (gate) built.
- 1180 – Santa María la Blanca synagogue built.
- 1209 – Rodrigo Jiménez de Rada becomes archbishop.
- 1227 – Toledo Cathedral construction begins.
- 1366 – Synagogue of El Transito built.
- 1380 – Public clock installed (approximate date).
- 1390 – Puente de San Martín (bridge) rebuilt.
- 1484 – Printing press in use.
- 1493 – Toledo Cathedral construction completed.
- 1520 – Real Universidad de Toledo established.
- 1561 – Court of Philip II of Spain relocated from Toledo to Madrid. Population: 60,000
- 1576 – Artist El Greco moves to Toledo.
- 1703 – Casa consistorial de Toledo (town hall) built.
- 1808 – Battalion of University Volunteers from the Royal University of Toledo formed.
- 1842 – Population: 13,580.
- 1857 – Population: 17,275.
- 1878 – Teatro Rojas (theatre) opens.
- 1887 – Alcázar of Toledo burns down.
- 1900 – Population: 23,317.

== 20th century ==
- 1919 – Toledo railway station built.
- 1928 – CD Toledo (football club) formed.
- 1930 – Population: 27,443.
- 1931 – Archivo Histórico Provincial de Toledo (provincial archives) established.
- 1936 – Siege of the Alcázar.
- 1940 – Historic city area designated a Conjunto histórico (national heritage site).
- 1950 – Population: 40,243.
- 1973 – Estadio Salto del Caballo (stadium) opens.
- 1979 – Juan Ignacio de Mesa becomes mayor.
- 1981 – Population: 57,769.
- 1986 – Historic city area designated a UNESCO World Heritage Site.
- 1987 – El Día de Toledo newspaper begins publication.
- 1998 – Biblioteca de Castilla-La Mancha (library) opens.

== 21st century ==
- 2001 – Population: 68,382.
- 2009 – Gente Toledo newspaper begins publication.
- 2011 – Population:83,872.
- 2015
  - 24 May: Province of Toledo municipal election, 2015 and Castile-La Mancha parliamentary election, 2015 held.
  - Milagros Tolón becomes mayor.

== See also ==
- Toledo, Spain history
- History of Toledo, Spain
- List of bishops and archbishops of Toledo
- List of mayors since 1979
- List of municipalities in Castilla-La Mancha

== Bibliography ==
=== in English ===
- Josiah Conder (1830), "Toledo", The Modern Traveller, London: J.Duncan
- "Spain: Toledo", Cities and Principal Towns of the World, Cabinet Cyclopaedia, London: Longman, Rees, Orme, Brown, & Green, 1830, OCLC 2665202
- Hannah Lynch (1898), Toledo, Mediaeval Towns, London: J.M. Dent & Co., OCLC 150311124
- "Toledo". Spain and Portugal (3rd ed.). Leipsic: Karl Baedeker. 1908. OCLC 1581249.
- Chisholm, Hugh (1910), "Toledo", Encyclopædia Britannica (11th ed.), New York, OCLC 14782424***Please note that a wikilink to the article on [Toledo, Spain] in [EB1911] is not available***
- Benjamin Vincent (1910), "Toledo", Haydn's Dictionary of Dates (25th ed.), London: Ward, Lock & Co.
- Francis Whiting Halsey, ed. (1914). "Toledo". Spain and Portugal. Seeing Europe with Famous Authors. Vol. 9. Funk & Wagnalls Company – via HathiTrust.
- Clarissa Levi (1995). "Toledo". In Trudy Ring (ed.). Southern Europe. International Dictionary of Historic Places. Vol. 3. Fitzroy Dearborn. pp. 716–719. ISBN 1884964028.
- David Gilmour (2012). "Toledo". Cities of Spain. Random House. ISBN 978-1-4481-3833-3.
- Colum Hourihane, ed. (2012). "Toledo". Grove Encyclopedia of Medieval Art and Architecture. Oxford University Press. ISBN 978-0-19-539536-5.
- H. Micheal Tarver, ed. (2016). "Key Places: Toledo". Spanish Empire: A Historical Encyclopedia. ABC-CLIO. ISBN 9781610694223.

=== in Spanish ===
- Cristóbal Lozano [in Spanish] (1667). Reyes Nuevos de Toledo (in Spanish) – via Google Books.
- "Toledo". Castilla la Nueva. Recuerdos y bellezas de España (in Spanish). Vol. 1. Jose Repullés. 1853. hdl:2027/ucm.5325879622.
- Antonio Martín Gamero [in Spanish] (1862). Historia de la ciudad de Toledo (in Spanish). Toledo: Severiano Lopez Fando.
- Jerónimo López de Ayala conde de Cedillo [in Spanish] (1890). Toledo: guía artístico-práctica (in Spanish and French). Toledo: Libreria y Encuadernación de Menor Hermanos.
