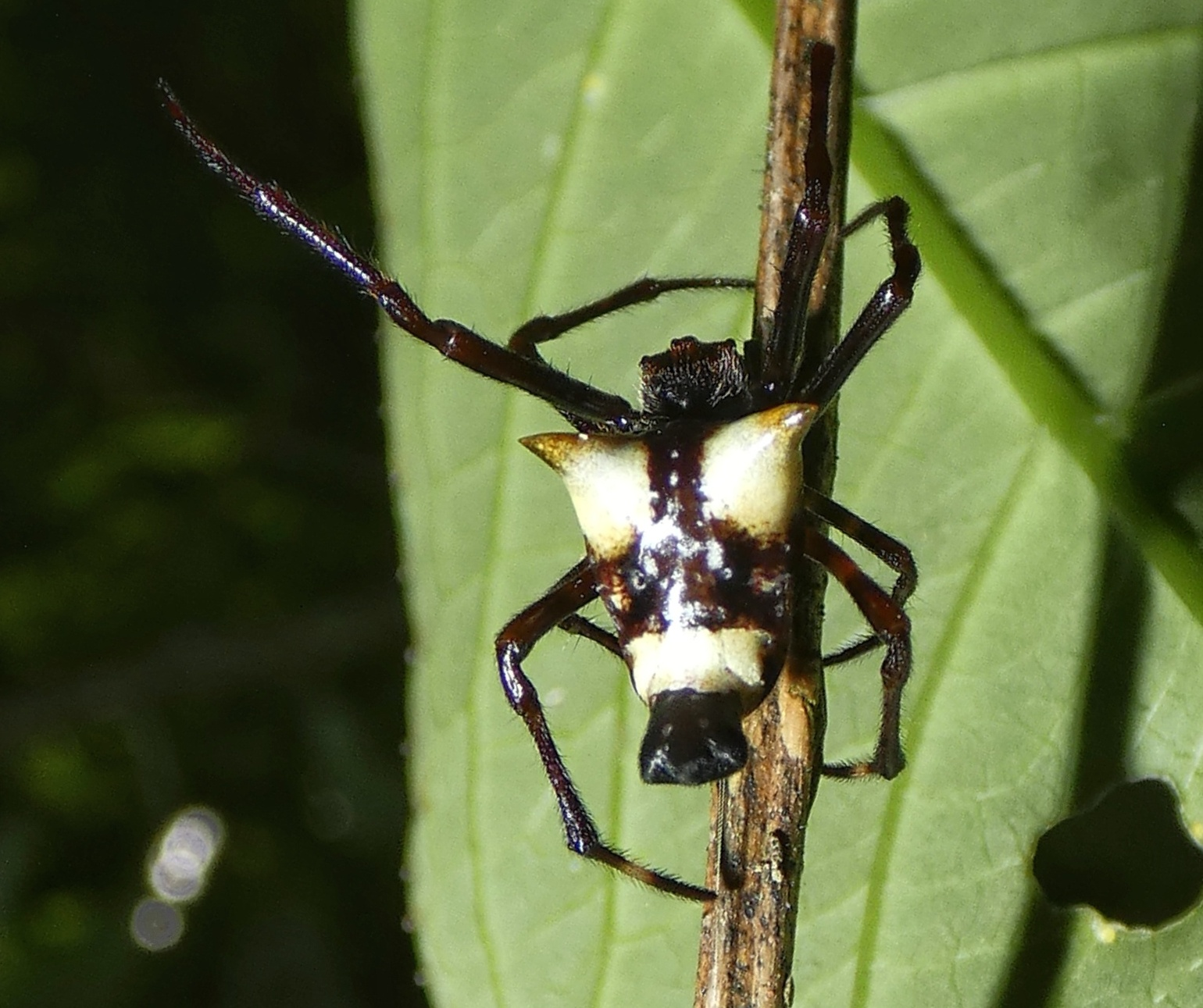
- W. crassicauda
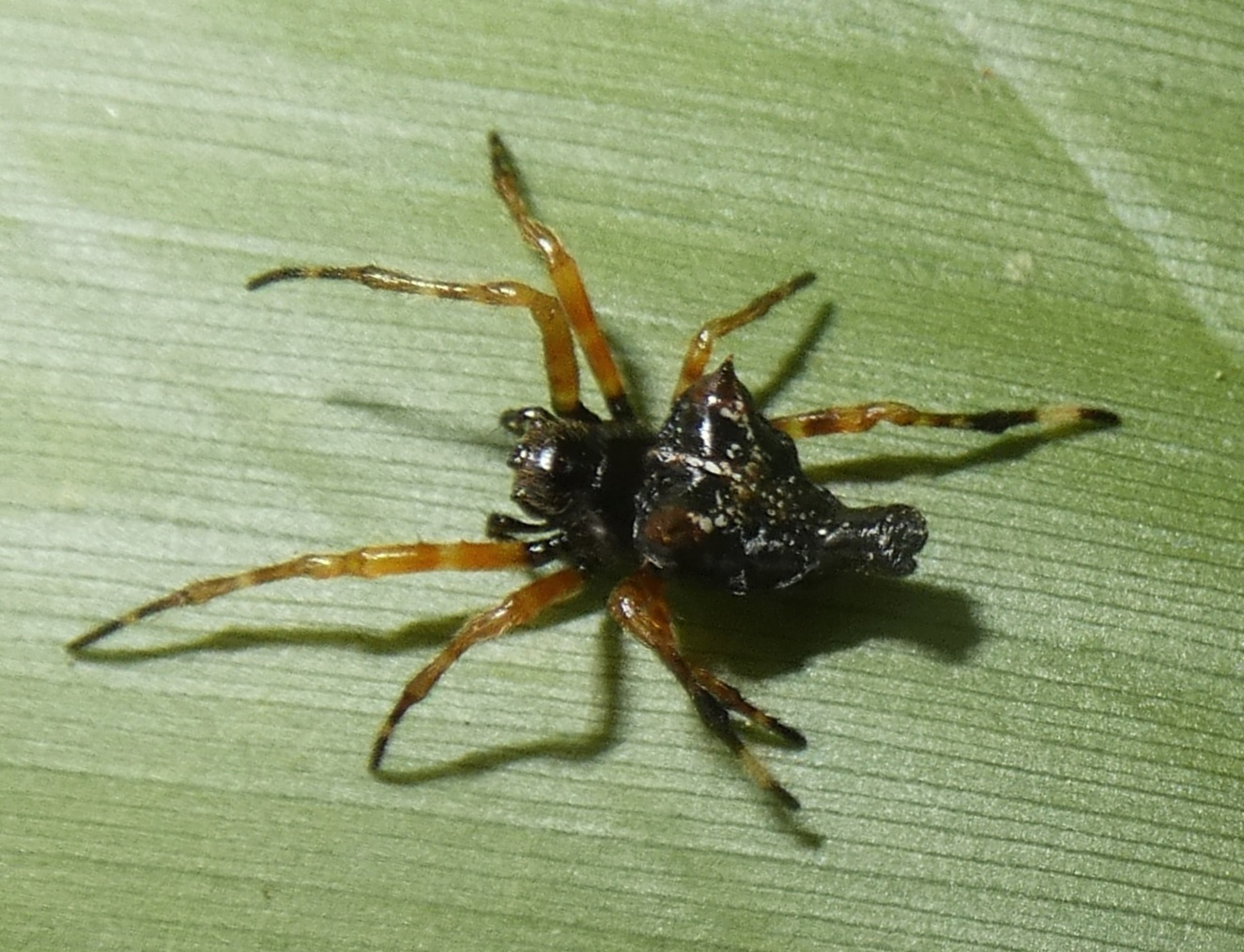
- W. crassicauda

Scientific classification
- Kingdom: Animalia
- Phylum: Arthropoda
- Subphylum: Chelicerata
- Class: Arachnida
- Order: Araneae
- Infraorder: Araneomorphae
- Family: Araneidae
- Genus: Witica
- Species: W. crassicauda

Binomial name
- Witica crassicauda (Keyserling, 1865)

Synonyms
- Epeira crassicauda Keyserling, 1865; Salassia tricuspis Gétaz, 1893; Cyclosa crassicauda (Keyserling, 1893); Witica talis O. Pickard-Cambridge, 1895; Salassina crassicauda (Simon, 1895); Physiola nigrans Simon, 1895; Bion brevis O. Pickard-Cambridge, 1898; Edricus crassicauda (F. O. Pickard-Cambridge, 1904); Edricus tricuspis (F. O. Pickard-Cambridge, 1904)

= Witica crassicauda =

Species of orb-weaver spider

Witica crassicauda is a species of orb-weaver spider in the family Araneidae. It is the type species of the genus Witica. The species is widely distributed across the Neotropics, ranging from Mexico to Peru.

== Etymology ==
The specific name crassicauda is derived from Latin, meaning "thick-tailed", referring to the shape of the abdomen.

== Distribution ==
W. crassicauda has been recorded from forests throughout Central and South America. The species occurs from Mexico through Central America to Venezuela and Peru, including the Greater Antilles. Specific locality records include numerous sites across Mexico, Guatemala, Honduras, Nicaragua, Costa Rica, Panama, Cuba, Dominican Republic, Puerto Rico, Trinidad, Venezuela, Colombia, and Peru.

== Habitat ==
The species inhabits forest environments throughout its range.

== Description ==
W. crassicauda shows considerable size variation between males and females, with females being significantly larger. Females have a total length of 6.5 to 12.0 mm, while males range from 1.4 to 1.7 mm. The carapace in females measures 3.2 mm long and 2.7 mm wide, compared to 0.9 mm long and 0.7 mm wide in males.

The species can be distinguished by several diagnostic features. The median septum of the epigyne is as wide or wider than the depressions on each side, and males possess a distinctive curved tube on the base of the embolus tip. The dorsal coloration, pattern, and shape of the female abdomen are variable characteristics within the species.

== Taxonomy ==
The species was originally described as Epeira crassicauda by Eugen von Keyserling in 1865. It has a complex taxonomic history, having been placed in several different genera and described under multiple names before being transferred to Witica by Herbert Walter Levi in 1986. Levi's revision synonymized several previously recognized species, including Edricus tricuspis and Witica talis, with W. crassicauda.
