= Sara al-Qutiyya =

8th century Visigothic noblewoman

Sara al-Qutiyya (Arabic: سارة القوطية, romanized: Sāra al-Qūṭiyya; Spanish: Sara la Goda) or Sara the Goth (fl. 8th century) was a Visigothic noblewoman, who was the grand-daughter of king Wittiza. After the death of her father she travelled to Damascus from al-Andalus and successfully petitioned the Umayyad caliph Hisham ibn Abd al-Malik to restore lands to her family that had been appropriated by her uncle. The historian Ibn al-Qutiyya was her great-grandson.

== Biography ==
Sara al-Qutiyya was born to a noble family; her father was Olmund [ca], a son of Wittiza the Visigothic king. When he died, Sara, along with her two younger brothers, inherited the family's lands around Seville. However, Olmund's brother, Artobas, who had inherited land-holdings in Cordoba, appropriated Sara and her brother's inheritance.

In order to challenge the occupation of her inherited lands in the Seville region, Sara al-Qutiyya had a ship constructed and travelled with her brothers to Damascus to petition the caliph, Hisham ibn Abd al-Malik. As a result of her petition, orders were sent to the governor of Al-Andalus, Abu'l-Khattar al-Husam ibn Darar al-Kalbi, to reinstate their Seville land-holdings to her and her brothers.

Whilst at court, Sara met the future Abd al-Rahman I, who reportedly "gave her special treatment and innumerable attentions". During this time, the caliph Hisham also arranged for her to marry a man called Isā Ibn Muzāḥim, with whom she had two sons: Ibrahim and Ishaq. After Isā Ibn Muzāḥim died in 138H (755/756), Abd al-Rahman I advised Sara to remarry, this time to Umayr ibn Sa'id, a member of the Lakhmid dynasty. They had a son called Habib, whose son, Ibrahim bin Hajjaj al-Lakhmi, later became governor of Seville.

== Legacy ==
Sara al-Qutiyya's sons established several significant dynasties in the generations after her death. The historian Ibn al-Qutiyya was one of her descendants, writing a history of the Umayyad caliphate and including his great-grandmother's life in it.

In 2018, the Spanish-language broadcaster RTVE recorded a documentary on her.

== Historiography ==
The story of Sara al-Qutiyya appears in the History of the Conquest of al-Andalus by Ibn al-Qutiyya and also in a biography of Ibn al-Qutiyya by Ibn Khallikan. As Visigothic royalty, Sara al-Qutiyya would have been a Christian. Her marriages to Muslim men have been seen by historians such as Mary Elizabeth Perry and Ilan Vit-Suzan, as emblematic of the Islamization of the Christian Visigothic elite of Al-Andalus. However the medievalist Roger Collins regards Sara as a "mythical ancestor" rather than a historical individual.
