= Fifteenth Council of Toledo =

The Fifteenth Council of Toledo first met in Toledo, Spain on 11 May 688 under Visigothic King Egica. It was the first of his three councils.

In 680-681, the sixth ecumenical council, the Third Council of Constantinople, had repudiated monothelitism and affirmed the doctrine of dyothelitism, that Christ had two wills. The decision of the council had been sent to Quiricus, metropolitan of Toledo, who died before it reached him, and ended up in the hands of his successor Julian. The response of the Spanish bishops to Pope Benedict II's letter was not to the pope's liking, especially the phrase voluntas genuit voluntatem, meaning "will engendered will". Nevertheless, Julian defended his propositions and it was the Fifteenth Council which adopted them. It has been theorised by some that a schism with the church of Rome was imminent, but diverted by political events in both Spain and Italy, such as the Moorish invasion of 711. This view, however, is not generally accepted.

Egica, besides the affirmation of Julian's theology, had a second reason to call the council. He had been obliged by his predecessor, Erwig, to take two oaths before assuming the kingship. First, he was forced to swear never to harm Erwig's children when Erwig gave him his daughter in marriage. Second, he was forced, on Erwig's deathbed, to vow to uphold justice for the people. Egica claimed that, on account of Erwig's injustices, he could not protect his children if he wanted to do justice to the people. It is usually presumed that Erwig had unjustly confiscated property and this was in the hands of his children. Therefore, Egica would have to take back that property to return it to its rightful possessors. He wished the protection of Erwig's children to be removed from his hands. The bishops ordered him to love his in-laws, but released him from his oath. He wished them also to reverse the Thirteenth Council's canon protecting Erwig's family, but the bishops refused, saying that that canon did not protect them from just penalties.

== Sources ==
- Thompson, E. A. The Goths in Spain, Clarendon Press: Oxford, 1969.
