= Gunderic (bishop) =

Archbishop of Toledo

Gunderic (Latin: Gundericus; died before 711) was the Archbishop of Toledo briefly between Felix and Sindered from about 701. He was a Visigoth and is highly praised in the Chronicle of 754, according to which he was a holy man who performed many miracles. Though certainly a man of learning, none of his writings are preserved.

He presided over the Eighteenth Council of Toledo (probably 703), which may have been encouraged by king Wittiza to force marriage on the priesthood.

== Sources ==
- Collins, Roger. Visigothic Spain, 409–711. Blackwell Publishing, 2004.
- Thompson, E. A. The Goths in Spain. Oxford: Clarendon Press, 1969.

Preceded by Felix	Archbishop of Toledo; 700–710	Succeeded by Sindered
