= Oppas =

Visigothic aristocrat

- Died: after 712; Visigothic Kingdom
- Father: Egica
- Mother: Cixilo

Oppas (died after 712), also spelled Oppa, was a member of the Visigothic elite in the city of Toledo on the eve of the Muslim conquest of Hispania. He was a son of Egica and therefore a brother or half-brother of Wittiza.

After the defeat of king Roderic at the Battle of Guadalete, according to the Chronicle of 754, the Arabs under Tariq ibn Ziyad marched as far as Toledo, but Oppa, who was staying there, fled the city before they took it. Tariq executed many nobles still in the city on the pretense that they had assisted in Oppa's flight. Since the battle of Guadalete took place, according to the same chronicle, in 712 and the conquest of Toledo in 711 but after Roderic's defeat, either the battle of Guadalete must be pushed back or the conquest of Toledo pushed forward; the latter is preferred by Roger Collins. Though Oppa fled Toledo, he may have been caught and executed soon after; but there is no indication that he did not survive.

It is possible that the Oppa who fled Toledo and was a son of a previous king was the cause of the "internal fury" which wracked Spain at the time, as recorded in the Chronicle. Perhaps Oppa had been elected, declared, or even consecrated king at Toledo by rivals of both Roderic and his opponent Achila II, either before Roderic's final defeat or between his death and the Arab capture of Toledo. If so, the death of the nobles who had "ambition for the kingdom" mentioned by the chronicler may have been Oppa's supporters who were killed in Toledo by the Arabs shortly after the battle in the south. Some historians, without any basis in the sources, have identified Oppa with Achila.

Oppa has grown in legend. According to the Chronicle of Alfonso III written in the late ninth century, he was a son of Wittiza, though based on Wittiza's approximate birth date, this is impossible. The Rotense version of the Alfonso III makes him an Archbishop of Toledo and the Ad Sebastianum version a Bishop of Seville. Oppa is said to have accompanied the Arab armies which invaded the Asturias in 718 in an attempt to put down Pelagius of Asturias. He reportedly engaged the rebel Goth in a long debate, but the Arabs were subsequently crushed in the Battle of Covadonga. This is undoubtedly a baseless legend. The only part of the general story presented by the Alfonso III that is otherwise backed up is the claim that he was bishop of Seville, since a late tenth-century manuscript mentions a bishop of that city named Oppa in the correct time period, but the chronicle may have been the list compiler's source. The Chronicle of Albelda confirms that a bishop Oppa was captured at Covadonga.

According to late sources, Oppa’s older brother or half-brother was Sisebut, who later became the count of the Christians of Coimbra, as were his son Ataulf (fl. 770), his grandson Athanaric (fl. 801–802), and his great-grandson Teudo (fl. 805), who had descendants also.

== Literature ==
In Alexandre Herculano's Eurico, o Presbítero, Oppas is portrayed as a traitor to his own country, whose troops treacherously went to the conqueror's side, and a close collaborator of the conquerors Musa and Tarik. He ends up killed in a fight against the main character, Eurico.

== Sources ==
- Collins, Roger (1989). The Arab Conquest of Spain, 710–797. Oxford: Oxford University Press. ISBN 0-631-15923-1.
- Collins, Roger (2004). Visigothic Spain, 409–711. Oxford: Blackwell Publishing. ISBN 0-631-18185-7.
- Thompson, E. A. (1969). The Goths in Spain. Oxford: Clarendon Press. ISBN 0-19-814271-4.
