= Liuvigoto =

Visigoth queen consort

Liuvigoto or Liubigotona (c. 650 – fl. 693) was a Visigoth queen consort by marriage to king Erwig (680–687).

She was a cousin of King Wamba. In 683, her spouse attempted to secure a reform in which the remarriage of a widow after the death of a king was banned as adultery, in order to prevent the custom of usurpers marrying the widows of their predecessors to legitimize their rule. Additionally, this reform was set to prevent successors doing harm to the wives and family of previous rulers - specifically, it named Liuvigoto as not to be harmed.

She was the mother of Cixilo, who married Egica; Egica then became Erwig's successor. Egica, who succeeded to the throne after Erwigs' death in 687, shortly thereafter sought to repudiate Cixilo, who he had married in order to promote his succession, and to send her to a convent.

For this purpose, in 688, during the Fifteenth Council, of Toledo, bishops, encouraged by Eciga, went against the previous protections for a deceased ruler's family, permitting Eciga to send Liuvigoto, Cixilo, and others to a convent.

In 691, Liuvigoto was solicited to participate in the rebellion of Sisebert against the king. In the Sixteenth Council of Toledo of 693, the conspirators were named as Liuvigoto, Frogellius, Theodemir, Luvilana and Thecla. After the revolt failed, she appears to have been forced back to a convent.
