= Sixteenth Council of Toledo =

The Sixteenth Council of Toledo first met in Toledo, Spain on 25 April 693. It was the second of three councils convened by Visigothic king Egica.

In 692, the archbishop of Toledo, Sisebert, led a rebellion with many nobles to install one Suniefred as king. The rebellion was put down in the latter half of that year and, at an unusual spring day, Egica called a general council of the church in Spain to deal with the future security of the kingship and the discipline of the renegades. Sixty bishops, five abbots, and six counts attended the council. The bishops of Narbonensis could not attend on account of an epidemic.

The king opened the council with a speech declaring that any officials who betrayed the trust of the Gothic people would be driven from office and enslaved to the treasury, forfeiting their property to the royal coffers. The king, the council concurred, could bestow this confiscated property on anyone he wished, the church obviously not excluded. The descendants of rebels were likewise prohibited from holding any palatine office. Finally, the rebels were anathematised on the basis of the seventy-fifth canon of the Fourth Council of Toledo.

On 2 May, the final day of the council, the bishops solemnly excommunicated Sisebert for life and defrocked him. He would be allowed communion on his deathbed only, unless the king pardoned him earlier. Without precedent, the bishops transferred the archbishop of Seville, Felix, to Toledo and the archbishop of Braga, Faustinus, to Seville. They also ordered the bishops of Narbonensis to approve the decrees of the Sixteenth Council in a local synod of their own.

The council also reformed the laws of the realm on several points. Incorporated into the Forum Iudicum formulated by Chindasuinth, published by Recceswinth, and modified by Erwig was the law that any oath rendered unto anybody other than the monarch was invalid and illegal. A few laws were revoked and some were reestablished, such as that prohibiting the mutilation of slaves.

Chindasuinth had punished homosexual acts with castration and excommunication, and the Toledo council reaffirmed similar rules. The Toledo council required that, for those convicted of homosexual acts, laypeople should be castrated and whipped, and clergy should be defrocked and exiled; after the council, Egica further ordered that clergy be castrated and executed.

The council was also important in the long legal history of the Visigoths in suppressing Judaism. Egica had apparently added to Erwig's law code tax-freedom to Jewish conversos and transferred their former burden to the unconverted. At the Sixteenth Council, converts were allowed to trade with Christians, but not until he had proved himself by recitation of creeds and eating of non-kosher food. Penalties were even enacted against Christians who transacted with unconverted or unproven Jews.

In regards the church, asides from dealing with the rebel Sisebert and the vacancy of his see, two important decrees were promulgated. Firstly, the bishops were ordered to maintain all church edifices in good repair and keep a priest in each parish. Secondly, the bishops were ordered to take all offerings offered by "rustics" to pagan gods and exterminate these continuing practice (no doubt only occurring in the remotest provincial backwaters).

== Sources ==
- Thompson, E. A., The Goths in Spain, Clarendon Press: Oxford, 1969.
