= Cixilo =

Visigoth queen consort

Cixilo (c. 665 – fl. 694) was a Visigoth queen consort, whom king Egica (687–702) married to secure his succession to the throne of Cixilo's father, Erwig.

She was the daughter of Erwig and Liuvigoto. She married Egica c. 680. Erwig, prior to his death, had made a law that no one could harm his wife or children; Egica set about overturning this law. Thereafter, although Egica gained his throne by marriage to Cixilo, he later decided his rule was sufficiently secure, and, possibly at the instigation of his uncle, Wamba, repudiated her in 687, forcing her into a convent.

This repudiation may only have been temporary, however, as she was attested to in 691 as well as 694.

At some point during the marriage, Cixilo may have given birth to Egica's son, Wittiza. However it is debated whether or not Cixilo was indeed the mother, though most sources see her as so being.
