= Agustín Conde =

Spanish politician (born 1965)

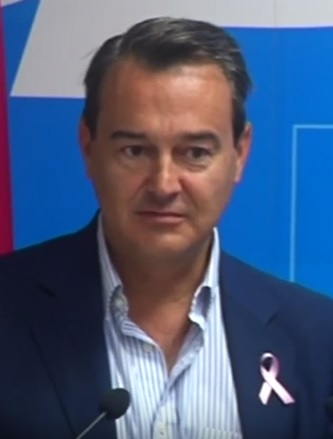
- Conde in 2013

Member of the Congress of Deputies
- Incumbent
- Assumed office 23 July 2023
- Constituency: Toledo
- In office 13 December 2011 – 13 January 2016
- Constituency: Toledo

Member of the Senate
- In office 23 July 1999 – 7 September 2011
- Appointed by: Cortes of Castilla–La Mancha (1999–2004)
- Constituency: Toledo (2004–2011)

Personal details
- Born: 7 June 1965 (age 60)
- Party: People's Party

Agustín Conde Bajén (born 7 June 1965) is a Spanish politician. He has been a member of the Congress of Deputies since 2023, having previously served from 2011 to 2015. From 1999 to 2011, was a member of the Senate. From 2016 to 2018, he served as Secretary of State for Defence. From 1995 to 1999, he served as mayor of Toledo.
