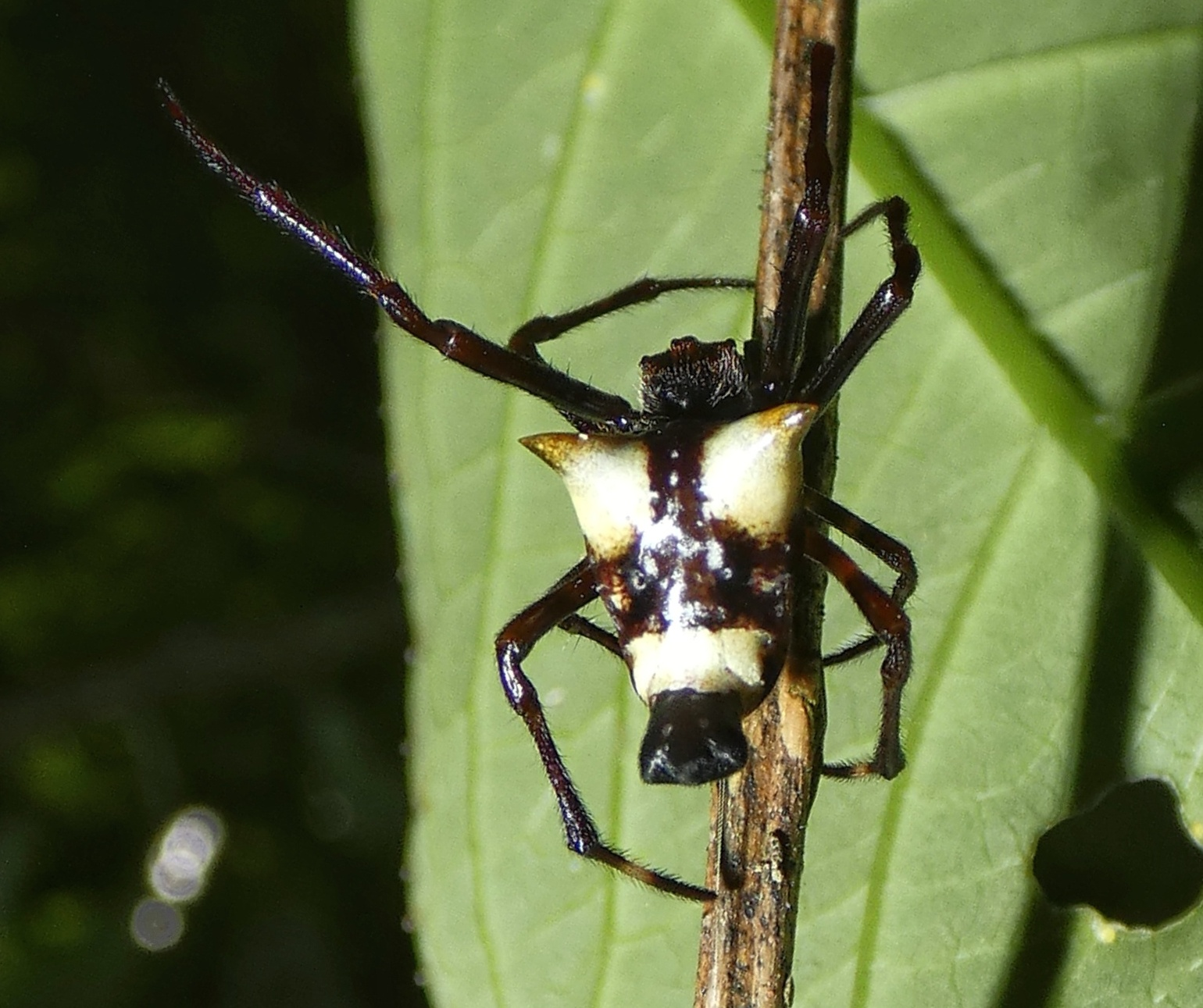
- W. crassicauda
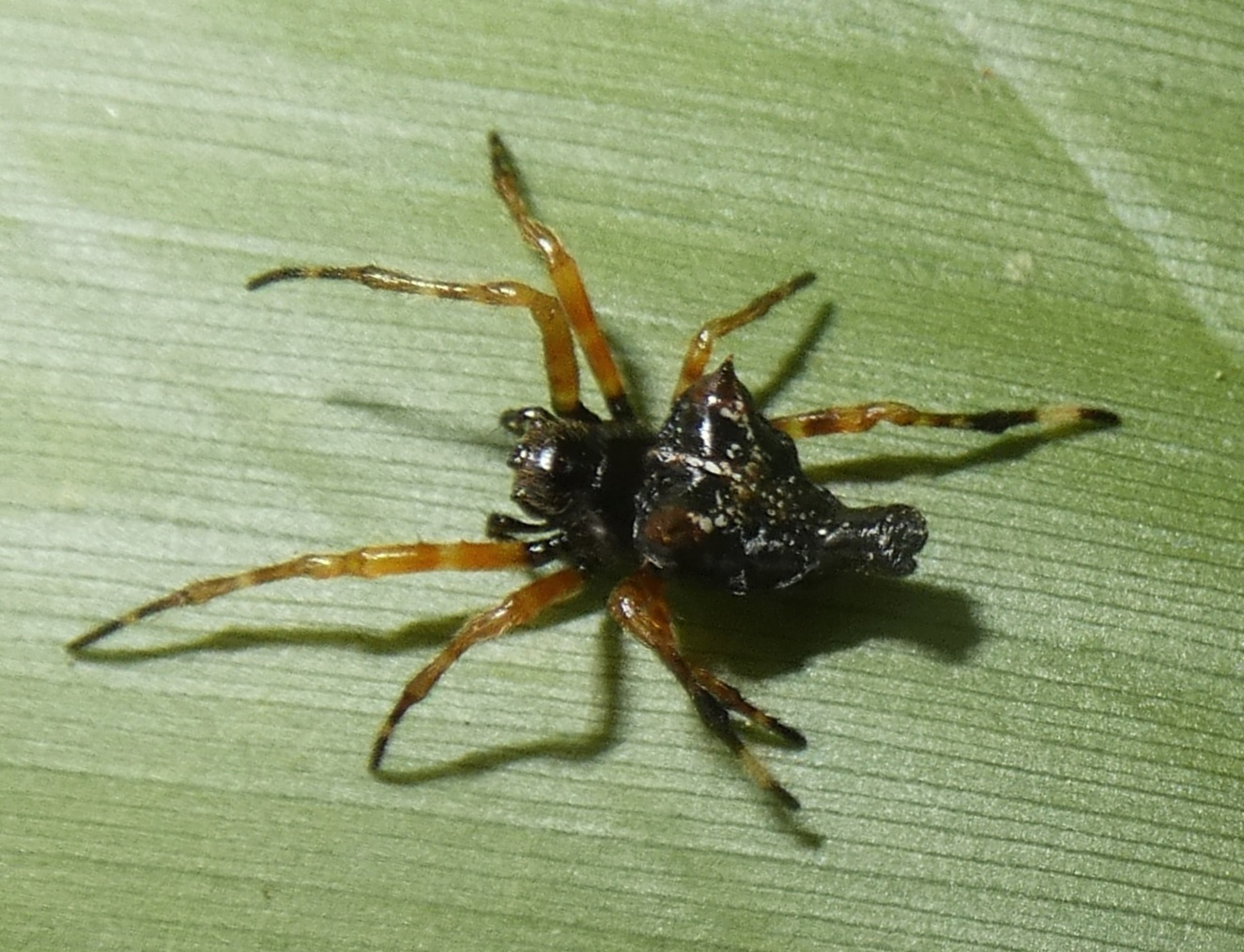
- W. crassicauda

Scientific classification
- Kingdom: Animalia
- Phylum: Arthropoda
- Subphylum: Chelicerata
- Class: Arachnida
- Order: Araneae
- Infraorder: Araneomorphae
- Family: Araneidae
- Genus: Witica; O. Pickard-Cambridge, 1895

Type species
- W. crassicauda (Keyserling, 1865)

Species
- 2, see text

Synonyms
- Salassina

= Witica (spider) =

Genus of spiders

Witica is a genus of orb-weaver spiders first described by Octavius Pickard-Cambridge in 1895.

== Species ==
As of January 2026, this genus includes two species:

- Witica cayanus (Taczanowski, 1873) – Colombia, Venezuela, Trinidad and Tobago, French Guiana, Ecuador, Peru, Brazil
- Witica crassicauda (Keyserling, 1865) – Mexico to Peru
