= Sisebert =

Sisbert or Sisebert was the metropolitan archbishop of Toledo from 690 to 693 as successor to the famous Julian.

In the latter year, he was at the head of a conspiracy to dethrone the king, Egica. He planned to assassinate the king, Queen Liuvigoto, and four of their closest advisors: Frogellus, Theodomir, Liuvila, and Tecla. It seems likely that the conspirators took Toledo itself and minted coins in the name of Duke Sunifred, whom they intended to crown. However, Egica defeated them and called the Sixteenth Council of Toledo to deal with the rebels. Sisbert was brought forward to confess his guilt to the assemblage of bishops and other ecclesiastics and was penalised, he and his descendants being prohibited from holding palatine office. Exceptionally, Archbishop Felix of Seville was translated to Toledo and Archbishop Faustinus of Braga to Seville.

== Sources ==
- Thompson, E. A. The Goths in Spain. Clarendon Press: Oxford, 1969.
