= Sindered =

Spanish archbishop

Sindered became Archbishop of Toledo in Visigothic Hispania around the year 710 or 711, succeeding Gunderic. But at least one later chronicler makes him archbishop during the reign of Wittiza (694–710), during which he supposedly took part in Wittiza's challenge to church authority during the last nine years of his reign. Sindered is said to have obeyed the king's orders "by continually harassing and persecuting men of high standing amongst the clergy" in the kingdom, though reliably recorded is only that, according to the Chronicle of 754, either he or Gunderic instituted some sort of pressure.

== Sources ==
- Bradley, Henry. The Goths: from the Earliest Times to the End of the Gothic Dominion in Spain. 2nd ed. New York: G. P. Putnam's Sons, 1883. (See chapter 34, pp. 355–357, in the Kessinger Publishing reprint, ISBN 1-4179-7084-7.)
- Collins, Roger. "'Sicut lex Gothorum continet': Law and Charters in Ninth- and Tenth-Century León and Catalonia." The English Historical Review, 100 (1985), 396, pp. 489–512.
- Collins, Roger. Visigothic Spain, 409–711. Blackwell Publishing, 2004.

== Notes ==
Catholic Church titles
Preceded by Gunderic	Archbishop of Toledo; 710/1–????	Succeeded by Sunirend
