= Seventeenth Council of Toledo =

694 AD synod under Iberian king Egica

The Seventeenth Council of Toledo first met on 9 November 694 under Visigothic King Egica. It was the king's third council and primarily directed, as was the Sixteenth, against the Jews, for whom Egica seems to have had a profound distrust and dislike.

The king opened the synod by claiming that he had heard news of Jews overthrowing their Christian rulers overseas and that Iberian Jews were conspiring with these cousins to end the Christian religion once and for all. The council therefore decreed in its eighth canon that all Jews, except those in Narbonensis, were to be deprived of their property, which was to be given to Christian slaves, and enslaved themselves. Their slavekeepers were chosen by the king and were to be contractually obligated to never allow the practice of the Jewish religion again. It is, however, almost certain that, in at least some parts of Spain, these regulations were not strictly enforced; though in others, they certainly were.

The council tried to protect the life of Egica's queen and children after his death, knowing the harm which could befall the royal family during a succession, and the bishops ordered prayers said for their souls.

The council's minutes remain the best source of information for its period in Spanish history.

== The eight canons of the synod ==
1. At the beginning of a Synod all the sacerdotes (bishops) shall fast for three days in honour of the Holy Trinity, and in this time, without the presence of the laity, hold converse on the doctrines of the faith and on the improvement of the morals of the clergy. After that they shall proceed to other subjects.
2. At the beginning of Lent, since from that time there are no more baptisms, except in case of extreme necessity, the font shall be sealed by the bishop with his ring, and so remain until the stripping of the altar at the feast of the Coena Domini.
3. The washing of feet at the feast of the Coena Domini, which has fallen into disuse in some places, must be observed everywhere.
4. The holy vessels and other ornaments of the Church may not be expended by the clergy for themselves, nor sold, etc.
5. Some priests hold Masses for the dead, on behalf of the living, that these may soon die. The priest who does this, and the person who induced him to do it, shall both be deposed and forever anathematised and excommunicated. Only on their deathbed may the communion be again administered to them.
6. All the year through, in all the twelve months, shall Exomologeseis (Litany) with intercessions be said for the Church, the King, and the people, that God may forgive them all.
7. The older laws for ensuring the safety of the royal family are renewed.
8. As the Jews have added to their other crimes this that they endeavoured to overthrow the country and the people, they must be severely punished. They have done this after they had (in appearance) received baptism, which, however, by faithlessness they have again stained. They shall be deprived of their property for the benefit of the exchequer, and shall be made slaves forever. Those to whom the King sends them as slaves must watch that they may no longer practise Jewish usages, and their children must be separated from them, when they are seven years of age, and subsequently married with Christians.

== Sources ==
- Hefele, Charles Joseph; Clark, William R. (trans.), A History of the Councils of the Church from the Original Documents, Vol. V (1896)
- Thompson, E. A., The Goths in Spain, Clarendon Press: Oxford, 1969.
