= Battalion of University Volunteers from the Royal University of Toledo =

The Battalion of University Volunteers from the Royal University of Toledo was a military unit created at the initiative of all the university's professors in August 1808 after the uprising of 2 May in Madrid against the Napoleonic invasion.

== Formation ==
After the formation of the Supreme Central Council of Aranjuez in September that started the war of independence, the University of Toledo approached the Provincial Council offering its services to create a battalion, without receiving a reply. On 14 August, the proposal was studied by various professors, and on the 17th the Corps of Honor Volunteers of the Royal University of Toledo Plan was approved. The proposal was submitted directly to the Supreme Central Council which approved it immediately, with the instruction that the university would be prepared to contribute its funds, together with the Town Council, for the support of the unit.

The number of men was fixed at six hundred distributed in four companies for which the military command would choose the officers and non-commissioned officers. Any number of students and professors who wanted voluntarily could join the battalion. The students could enjoy academic advantages which included passing the time that would have been spent in the National Militia, in the Battalion. Also, the vestuary, uniformity and training hours were instituted. The unit remained entrusted to Lieutenant Colonel Bartolomé Obeso, who represented the Central Council.

== Activities ==
The events of the war forced the Central Council to move to the south, on the road to Seville. After spending the night in Toledo on 1 December, the battalion of volunteers was designated as an escort until it reached the destination, which happened on 17 December. The unit remained in the area, fighting at the outskirts throughout 1809. In addition to supplying officers to diverse combat units, it was the embryo of the Seville Military Academy. Among its most prominent members was Baldomero Espartero, who would much later become Regent of Spain during the minority of Isabel II and the leader of the Progressive Party.
