= Wittiza =

Visigoth King of Hispania from 694 to c.710

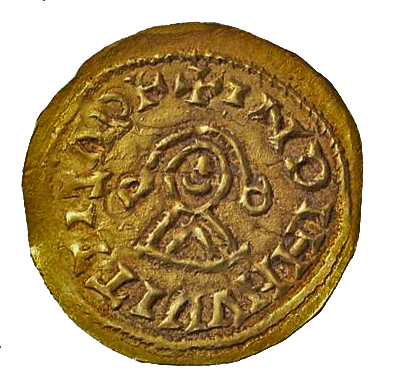
- A golden triente minted at Braga during the reign of Wittiza and bearing his (rough) effigy

King of the Visigoths
- Reign: 694 – 710
- Predecessor: Egica
- Successor: Roderic
- Co-ruler: Egica (694 – 702/703)
- Born: c. 687; Visigothic Kingdom
- Died: 710 (aged 22–23); Visigothic Kingdom
- Father: Egica
- Mother: Cixilo

Wittiza (Witiza, Witica, Witicha, Vitiza, or Witiges; c. 687 – probably 710) was the king of the Visigoths from 694 until his death, co-ruling with his father, Egica, until 702 or 703.

== Joint rule ==
Early in his reign, Egica made it clear that his intention was to secure his family in a position of power from which they could not be removed. Based on a charter dated to Egica's seventh year (November 693 to November 694) which mentions Wittiza as co-king, it is probable that Wittiza was made co-ruler in 694, even though the Chronicle of 754 places the event in 698. Numismatic analysis of coinage types also supports the thesis that Wittiza ruled from 694. The raising of Wittiza to the kingship coincided with the revolt of Suniefred and may have been either its cause or effect.

On 15 or 24 November 700, Wittiza was anointed king; this forms the last entry in the Chronica Regum Visigothorum, a Visigothic regnal list. The delay between his appointment as co-regent and his unction, to which much importance was ascribed, is most probably explained by his coming of age, likely fourteen, in that year. Wittiza was Egica's son by Cixilo, daughter of the previous king Erwig, who was dismissed by her husband in late 687 after a short marriage and thus puts a limit on the possible date of birth of Wittiza.

Sometime during the joint reign of Egica and Wittiza, a Byzantine fleet raided the coasts of southern Hispania and was driven off by Theudimer. The dating of this event is disputed: it may have occurred as part of Leontios' expedition to relieve Carthage in 697, perhaps later, around 702, or perhaps late in Wittiza's reign. A plague broke out at Constantinople in 698 and it spread westward across the Mediterranean reaching Hispania in 701. It was severe enough to force the two kings from their capital of Toledo and it might be that this was the period when Wittiza was sent by his father to rule in Tui in Gallaecia over the regnum Suevorum, an event recorded by the Chronicle of Alfonso III. Although often dismissed by scholars, there is numismatic evidence that suggests Wittiza's subkingdom was a reality.

== Sole rule ==
The death of Egica can be dated to 702 (traditionally) or 703 (based on the fact that Egica promulgated a law in his sixteenth year, which began on 24 November 702).

=== Concessions upon succession ===
Soon after his death, the Eighteenth Council of Toledo was held under the supervision of Wittiza and the archbishop of Toledo, either Gunderic or Sindered. The acts of the council are lost to us, but may have been highly controversial, leading to their suppression. Wittiza may have forced the council to force marriage upon the Catholic clergy. There is a reference in the Chronicle of 754 to Wittiza commanding Sindered to exert pressure on the established clergy, but what exactly this means is unknown. It may mean that he pressured the Eighteenth Council to ratify the decision of the Quinisext Council that clerical marriage was permissible: according to the Chronicle of Alfonso III, Fruela I of Asturias (757–68) reversed this ruling. The collective sense is that Wittiza made an effort to reform corruptions in the Visigothic Catholic church.

Of Wittiza's early acts after his father's demise was the rescission of the exile of several noblemen. He returned their slaves and confiscated property, and reinstated them in their palatine offices. Wittiza also had the cautiones written against them burned publicly. The cautiones were probably pledges, cessions, or confessions the exiles had been forced to sign; or statements of debt to the treasury. Wittiza also returned land which his family was holding to the royal fisc in accordance with the law. All this activity was probably a response to complaints made about his father's rule and which he considered politically wise to correct. The Chronicle of 754 calls Wittiza "merciful", and only criticizes the method of his succession, probably in reference to these events and to the hated Egica.

=== Legislation ===
During his years of sole government, Wittiza promulgated two new laws and issued a revised version of the Liber Iudiciorum. This reissue, too, may be related to the political situation following Egica's death and Wittiza's need to consolidate his authority and the support of the nobility and the clergy.

Though he himself passed no legislation further oppressing the Jews, Wittiza also probably did not repeal the legislation of his father in that regard. A thirteenth-century chronicle by Lucas of Tuy accuses Wittiza of relieving the oppression of the Jews and being eager for their support in an attempt to smear him as a "Jew-lover." The accuracy of Lucas' statement, despite the lateness of it, has been bolstered by the fact that Lucas was from Tui, the Galician city whereat Wittiza probably ruled as sub-king under his father at one point. Perhaps the people of Tui preserved an oral tradition or perhaps the canons of XVIII Toledo were available to Lucas.

A law sometimes attributed to Egica which prescribes the caldaria (ordeal of boiling water) for those accused of theft no matter how small the sum has been attributed to Wittiza by some.

== Death, succession crisis and legacy ==
The date of Wittiza's death and the end of his reign are unknown. The several surviving regnal lists imply a death year of 710 (sometimes with a death month of February) while the Chronicle of 754 implies 711. Whatever the case, the Chronicle strongly implies that he was assassinated in a coup led by Roderic with the support of a faction of nobles. Others believe he died a natural death. At the time, the king was still only in his twenties.

After his death, natural or forced, or deposition, Hispania was divided between rival claimants: Roderic in the south and Achila II in the north. Agila may have been a son of Wittiza's and a co-monarch (from about 708), but this would require that he be either a child king or that Wittiza not be the son of Cixilo. Others say Wittiza left two sons not yet of age. At the time of his death, "he was beloved in the highest degree by the people and equally hated by the priesthood."

Whatever the actual circumstances surrounding the end of Wittiza's reign, memory of him was not positive a century and a half later. The Chronicle of Moissac, circa 818, wrote that Witicha deditus in feminis exemplo suo sacerdote ac populum luxuriose vivere docuit, irritans furorem Domini: "Wittiza left a poor example to his clergy and his people by his unchaste life, thus provoking the fury of the Lord." The Chronicle of Alfonso III mentions his many wives and mistresses and how he brought "ruin to Hispania", while the Chronicle of 754, written less than a half century after his death, records that he brought "joy and prosperity" to the kingdom.

The "sons of Wittiza", who are otherwise unknown, are made out by the Chronicle of Alfonso III to be traitors who helped deliver Hispania to the Moors. Oppa, a shadowy but historical figure, is reputed to have been either a brother, half-brother, or a son of Wittiza, though the latter is impossible based simply on Wittiza's youthfulness and Oppa's reputed age in 711. According to the Rotensis version of the Chronicle of Alfonso III, Wittiza had three sons: Olmund [ca], Romulus, and Ardabast (Artabasdus), who became Count of the Christians of Coimbra. Olmund is a Gothic name, Romulus is Roman, and Ardabast (Artavasdes) is Persian (through Armenian).

Olmund's daughter, Sara al-Qutiyya, and her brothers had their lands appropriated in the succession crisis, by their uncle Ardabast. She travelled to Damascus to petition Hisham ibn Abd al-Malik for their return, which he then ordered.

== Legend ==
According to American writer and historian Washington Irving, in the first part of his 1835 Legends of the Conquest of Spain, Wittiza's reign initially showed great promise. "He redressed grievances, moderated the tributes of his subjects, and conducted himself with mingled mildness and energy in the administration of the laws." However, the honeymoon lasted only a short while. Soon Wittiza "showed himself in his true nature, cruel and luxurious."

Coming to doubt the security of his throne, he ended the careers of two relatives regarded as rivals: Favila, Duke of Cantabria, and Theodofred, duke of Córdoba, who lived in retirement at court. Wittiza had Favila killed and Theodofred blinded then imprisoned in the Córdoba dungeon. The son of Favila, who we are told was Pelayo, happened to be elsewhere at the time and was thus spared for the major role he would later play in history. The son of Theodofred was Roderic, duke of Baetica, who escaped to Italy.

At last feeling safe, the king "gave reins to his licentious passions, and soon, by his tyranny and sensuality, acquired the appellation of Witiza the Wicked." Specifically, using secret orders he demolished castles that he feared could be used by future internal enemies, oblivious to the possibility that he was weakening the kingdom's defenses against foreign invaders. And at court, inspired by the custom of Muslim rulers, he "indulged in a plurality of wives and concubines, encouraging his subjects to do the same."

In later times such stories were told of Wittiza because, in opposition to the policies of the Church hierarchy, he had been lenient toward the Jews and had encouraged the clergy to marry. Therefore, when the kingdom met sudden ruin in the first year of his successor Roderic (a favorite of the Church), this was readily explained by alleging that the sins of Wittiza "had drawn down the wrath of Heaven upon the unhappy nation."

As the story goes, it was in an attempt to save Hispania from such divine punishment that the exiled Roderic returned from Italy with an army. Wittiza was soon defeated in the field and taken captive. Roderic was then crowned king at Toledo, after which he avenged his father by having Wittiza blinded and imprisoned at Córdoba. There the former king "passed the brief remnant of his days in perpetual darkness, a prey to wretchedness and remorse."

== Sources ==
- Bachrach, Bernard S. "A Reassessment of Visigothic Jewish Policy, 589–711." The American Historical Review, Vol. 78, No. 1. (Feb., 1973), pp 11–34.
- Collins, Roger. "'Sicut lex Gothorum continet': Law and Charters in Ninth- and Tenth-Century León and Catalonia." The English Historical Review, Vol. 100, No. 396. (Jul., 1985), pp 489–512.
- Collins, Roger. The Arab Conquest of Spain, 710–97. Oxford: Blackwell Publishing, 1989. ISBN 0-631-15923-1.
- Collins, Roger. Visigothic Spain, 409–711. Blackwell Publishing, 2004.
- García Moreno, Luis A. "Prosopography, Nomenclature, and Royal Succession in the Visigothic Kingdom of Toledo." Journal of Late Antiquity, 1(1:2008), 142–56.
- Hodgkin, Thomas. "Visigothic Spain." The English Historical Review, Vol. 2, No. 6. (Apr., 1887), pp 209–34.
- Irving, Washington. Legends of the Conquest of Spain, originally from The Crayon Miscellany, Volume 3 (1835); in Irving, Pierre M. Spanish Papers. Philadelphia: J.B. Lippincott and Company, 1871.
- King, P. D. "King Chindasvind and the First Territorial Law-code of the Visiogothic Kingdom." Visigothic Spain: New Approaches. ed. Edward James. Oxford: Clarendon Press, 1980. pp 131–57.
- López Sánchez, Fernando. "La moneda del reino visigodo en Toledo: ¿Por qué? ¿Para quién?" Mainake, Vol. 31 (2009), pp 175–86.
- Thompson, E. A. The Goths in Spain. Oxford: Clarendon Press, 1969.

== Notes ==
Regnal titles
Preceded by Egica	King of the Visigoths; 694–710	Succeeded by Roderic and Achila II
