= Egica =

Visigoth King of Hispania and Septimania from 687 to ~702 AD

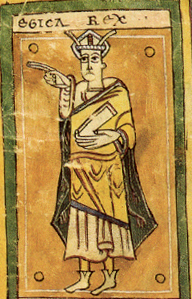
- Egica in the 9th-century Codex Vigilanus

King of the Visigoths
- Reign: 15 November 687 – 701/703
- Predecessor: Erwig
- Successor: Wittiza
- Born: c. 640; Visigothic Kingdom
- Died: 701/703 (aged 61 or 63); Visigothic Kingdom
- Spouse: Cixilo (m. 680)
- Issue: Wittiza; Oppas

Egica, Ergica, or Egicca (c. 640 – 701/703), was the Visigoth King of Hispania and Septimania from 687 until his death. He was the son of Ariberga and the nephew of Wamba.

== Accession ==
He was married (c. 680) to Cixilo (also known as Cixilona, Cioxillo, or Cixila), the daughter of his royal predecessor Erwig and that king’s wife Liuvigoto. On his deathbed on 14 November 687, Erwig confirmed Egica as his heir and sent him with the royal court to Toledo to be crowned. He was anointed on 24 November. Upon Egica's marriage to Cixilo, Erwig had made him swear an oath to protect Erwig's children. Before his death Erwig required a second oath, swearing not to deny justice to the people. Shortly after taking the throne, Egica called the Fifteenth Council of Toledo on 11 May 688, at which he claimed the two oaths were contradictory (because to do justice to the people required "harming" Erwig's children) and asked the council of bishops to release him from one or the other. Egica, however, met the opposition of Julian of Toledo. The council allowed Egica to abandon his wife but only partially rescinded the oath to protect Erwig's children. Egica waited until Julian's death in 690 to call a second provincial council of Tarraconensis, which resulted in Erwig's widow, Liuvigoto, being sent to a convent.

== Notable events ==
In 691, Egica oversaw the beginning of the building of the Church of San Pedro de la Nave in Zamora.

In 693, the metropolitan of Toledo, Sisebert, led a rebellion against Egica in favor of raising a man named Suniefred to the throne. The rebels controlled Toledo for a time, because they were able to mint coins in the potential usurper's name. The plan to assassinate Egica, the dowager queen Liuvigoto, and several main counsellors failed, and Sisebert was defrocked, excommunicated and his descendants were barred from holding office. The other rebels and their descendants were sold into slavery.

== Legislation ==
In 693, Egica enacted severe anti-Jewish laws described as the most significant such laws by a Visigothic king yet. This was in response, so Egica claimed to the Seventeenth Council of Toledo, to a conspiracy of domestic and foreign Jews to overthrow Christian leaders. Egica declared all Jewish-held land forfeit, all Jews to be enslaved to Christians, and all Jewish children over the age of seven to be taken from their homes and raised as Christians. Jewish-owned Christian slaves were to be invested with the Jews' property and to be responsible for paying the taxes on the Jews. This law was not applied in towns where Jews were deemed indispensable to the economy. Indeed, in light of disintegrating Visigothic power, it was hardly enforced beyond the capital city of Toledo itself.

Shortly before he died, Egica amended a law that stated that anyone accused of theft of goods worth 300 solidi was to undergo a trial by boiling water. Under Egica's changes, anyone accused of theft for whatever amount would have to undergo this ordeal. At the same time, Egica published several laws that dealt harshly with the issue of fugitive slaves, while simultaneously rescinding laws that permitted slaveholders to mutilate their slaves as punishment. Egica also remitted taxes, but this does not seem to have raised his popularity. He got the bishops to order prayers to be said in his name and that of his family in every cathedral in Hispania.

== Death and succession ==
As early as 694 he co-ruled with Wittiza, his son by Cixilo, even though Wittiza was a minor. In one of his very last acts he had Wittiza anointed in 700. Egica died in his bed, with his succession secured, sometime between 701 and 703.

His other two sons were Don Oppas, and Sisebuto. Don Oppas, who was possibly a bastard son, was Archbishop or Bishop of Seville and joined Musa bin Nusair and Tariq ibn Ziyad against Roderic during the Umayyad conquest of Hispania. Sisebuto became the Comes of the Christians of Coimbra, as did his son Ataulfo, his grandson Atanarico and his great-grandson Teudo in 770, 801/802 and 805.

== Sources ==
- Collins, Roger. The Arab Conquest of Spain, 710–97. Oxford University Press, 1989.
- Collins, Roger. Visigothic Spain, 409–711. Blackwell Publishing, 2004.
- Thompson, E. A. The Goths in Spain. Oxford: Clarendon Press, 1969.

== Notes ==
Regnal titles
Preceded by Erwig	King of the Visigoths; 15 November 687 – November/December 702	Succeeded by Wittiza
