= Suniefred =

Suniefred was a Visigothic nobleman who rebelled during the reign of Egica (r. 687 – c. 702) and briefly ruled as king from Toledo.

A single coin that is related stylistically to those of the sole reign of Egica indicates that a king of the name of SVNIEFREDVS seized power in Toledo at some point in these years, and for long enough to have the mint start issuing in his name.

Suniefred is probably the same person as the "chief cupbearer and duke" of the same name in the canons of the Thirteenth Council of Toledo (683).

== Sources ==
- Thompson, E. A. The Goths in Spain. Clarendon Press, 1969.
- Collins, Roger. Visigothic Spain, 409–711. Blackwell Publishing, 2004.
- Livermore, Harold. Twilight of the Goths. Intellect Books, 2006.
- Montenegro, Julia; Castillo, Arcadio del. "Theodemir's Victory over the Byzantines in the Joint Reign of Egica and Witiza: A reference by the Chronicle of 754". Byzantion, 74, 2 (2004), pp. 403–415.
