= 397 =

397 in various calendars
- Gregorian calendar: 397; CCCXCVII
- Ab urbe condita: 1150
- Assyrian calendar: 5147
- Balinese saka calendar: 318–319
- Bengali calendar: −197 – −196
- Berber calendar: 1347
- Buddhist calendar: 941
- Burmese calendar: −241
- Byzantine calendar: 5905–5906
- Chinese calendar: 丙申年 (Fire Monkey); 3094 or 2887 — to — 丁酉年 (Fire Rooster); 3095 or 2888
- Coptic calendar: 113–114
- Discordian calendar: 1563
- Ethiopian calendar: 389–390
- Hebrew calendar: 4157–4158
- Hindu calendars
- Vikram Samvat: 453–454
- Shaka Samvat: 318–319
- Kali Yuga: 3497–3498
- Holocene calendar: 10397
- Iranian calendar: 225 BP – 224 BP
- Islamic calendar: 232 BH – 231 BH
- Javanese calendar: 280–281
- Julian calendar: 397; CCCXCVII
- Korean calendar: 2730
- Minguo calendar: 1515 before ROC 民前1515年
- Nanakshahi calendar: −1071
- Seleucid era: 708/709 AG
- Thai solar calendar: 939–940
- Tibetan calendar: མེ་ཕོ་སྤྲེ་ལོ་ (male Fire-Monkey); 523 or 142 or −630 — to — མེ་མོ་བྱ་ལོ་ (female Fire-Bird); 524 or 143 or −629

Year 397 (CCCXCVII) was a common year starting on Thursday of the Julian calendar. In the Roman Empire, it was known as the Year of the Consulship of Caesarius and Atticus (or, less frequently, year 1150 Ab urbe condita). The denomination 397 for this year has been used since the early medieval period, when the Anno Domini calendar era became the prevalent method in Europe for naming years.

== Events ==
=== By place ===
==== Roman Empire ====
- Revolt of Alaric I: Stilicho traps the Visigoths under King Alaric in the Peloponnese, but decides to abandon the campaign against the Visigoths in Greece, thus allowing King Alaric to escape north to Epirus with his loot. Presumably, Stilicho has left Greece in order to prepare for military action in northern Africa, where a rebellion (see Gildonic Revolt in 398) seems imminent.
- Emperor Honorius passes a law making barbarian styles of dress illegal in the city of Rome. As a result of this law, everybody in Rome is forbidden from wearing boots, trousers, animal skins, and long hair. This law is passed in response to the increasing popularity of barbarian fashions among the people of Rome.

==== China ====
- The Xiongnu occupy the Gansu area, an economically important province situated along the Silk Road.

=== By topic ===
==== Religion ====
- April 4 – Ambrose, Archbishop of Milan, dies in his diocese after 23 years in office, during which he dominated the political life of the Roman Empire.
- August 28 – Council of Carthage: The biblical canon is definitely declared.
- September 7 – First Council of Toledo: Hispanic bishops, including Lampius, condemn Priscillianism.
- November 13 – John Chrysostom is appointed Archbishop of Constantinople.
- Mor Gabriel Monastery is founded and located on the Tur Abdin plateau near Midyat (Turkey).
- Sulpicius Severus writes the earliest biography of Martin of Tours, the first known "life of a saint" ever written.
- Augustine of Hippo begins his Confessions, an autobiography that recounts his intellectual and spiritual development.
- Scottish missionary Ninian establishes a church (Candida Casa) at Whithorn, and begins his work among the Picts.

== Births ==
- March 30 or March 31 – Kʼukʼ Bahlam I, king of Palenque (Yucatán Peninsula, Mexico)

== Deaths ==
- April 4 – Aurelius Ambrosius, bishop of Milan
- November 8 – Martin of Tours, bishop and saint
- Murong Hui, imperial prince of Later Yan (b. 373)
- Murong Long, general and prince of Later Yan
- Empress She, wife of emperor Yao Chang
