= Council of Toledo of 447 =

The Council of Toledo of 447 was the second Council of Toledo (though the Council of Toledo of 527 is normally called this). It was a national council held against the Priscillianists (a schismatic sect with Gnostic-Manichaean, Sabellian, and Monophysite doctrine), as called for by Pope Leo I. Nineteen bishops participated in the council, which condemned the heresy and the followers of Priscillian and affirmed the earlier First Council of Toledo, on which its Creed is based. It gave a profession of faith against all heretics with 18 anathemas attached against the doctrines of Priscillian. The council is notable for its successful subduing of Priscillianism, expressing a definition of dyophysitism before the Council of Chalcedon, its affirmation of the First Council of Toledo, and being the first known western council to include the "filioque" in its creed, following in the doctrine from Pope Leo I.

There is some controversy as to the reality of this Council. It was called for by Pope Leo I, in a letter preserved in the register, but there is no contemporary evidence that it was held. The letter in question is Leo’s Epistula 15 (Migne, ed., PL 54, 678-695). Vague mention is made of the supposed Toledo council at the First Council of Braga, held in 562, but some have argued that the bishops there were confused, and instead had a copy of the profession of faith from I Toledo. See Concilio de Braga I, ed. José Vives, in Concilios visigóticos e hispano-romanos, 65-67. There is a full discussion in Domingo Ramos-Lissón, Historia de los concilios de la España romana y visigoda, in the chapter “Los concilios hispánicos antes de Recaredo”.
