= Leocadia =

1st/2nd-century Spanish saint and martyr

Saint Leocadia
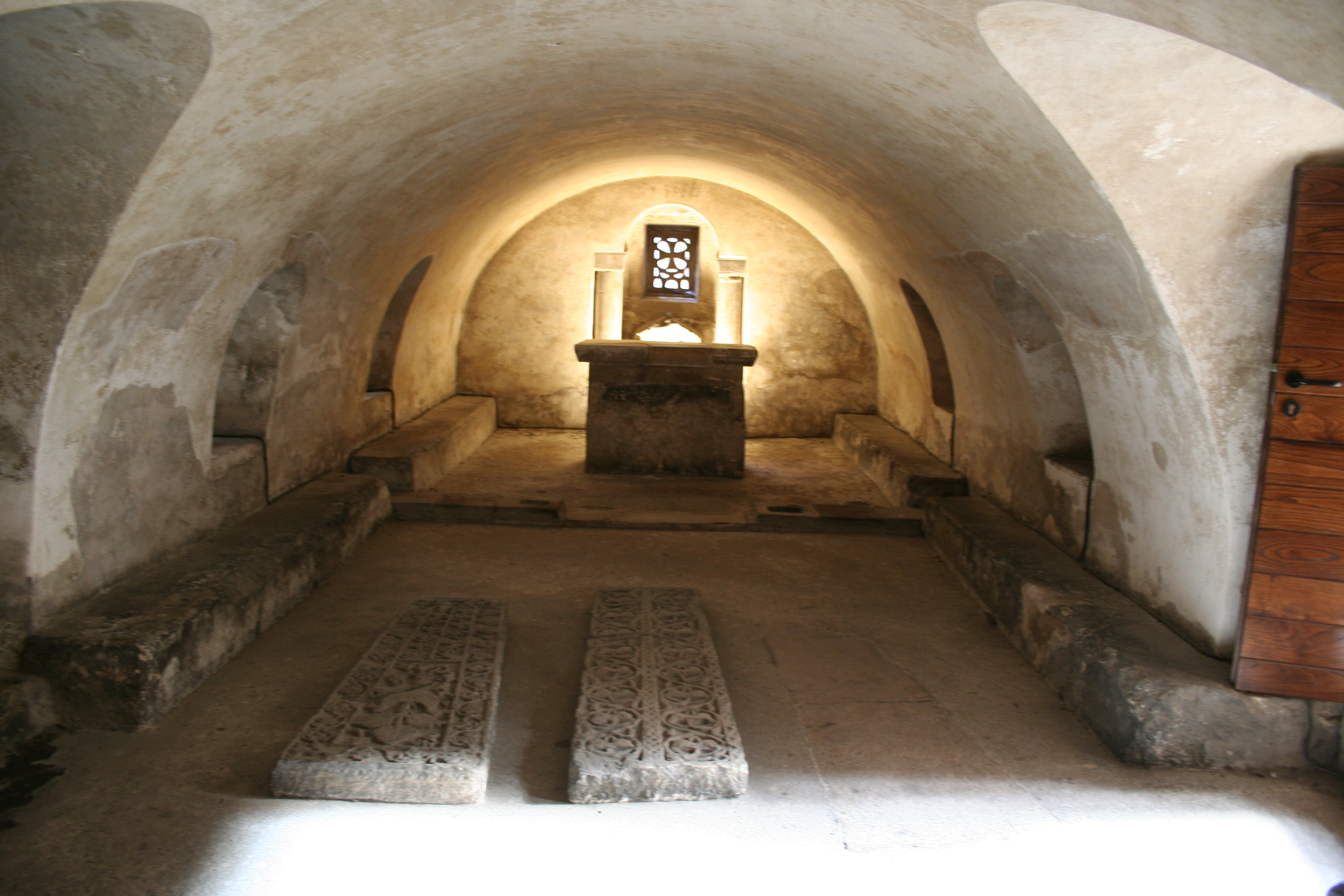
- Crypt of Saint Leocadia, Oviedo.
- Died: December 9, c. 304
- Venerated in: Roman Catholic Church; Eastern Orthodox Church
- Major shrine: Toledo, Spain
- Feast: 9 December
- Attributes: Represented with a tower, to signify that she died in prison.
- Patronage: Archdiocese of Toledo

Saint Leocadia (French: Sainte Léocadie; Spanish: Santa Leocadia) is a Spanish saint. She is thought to have suffered martyrdom and died on December 9, ca. 304, in the Diocletianic Persecution.

The feast day for St. Leocadia of Toledo appears under 9 December in the historical martyrologies of the ninth century. Her name is not mentioned by Prudentius in his hymn on the martyrs of Spain. However, in very early times there was a church dedicated to her at Toledo.

In the first half of the seventh century "the church of Saint Leocadia" was mentioned as the meeting-place of the Fourth Synod of Toledo in 633, as well as of the fifth in 636, and the sixth in 638.

Of her veneration, the Catholic Encyclopedia writes that "long before that date, therefore, Leocadia must have been publicly honoured as a martyr. The basilica in question was evidently erected over her grave. There is no doubt of the historical fact of her martyrdom, whilst the date of 9 December for her annual commemoration obviously rests on the tradition of the Church of Toledo. More recently compiled Acts relate that Leocadia was filled with a desire for martyrdom through the story of the martyrdom of St. Eulalia."

By order of the governor, Decianus, described in the martyrology as the most furious persecutor of the Christians in Spain, she was seized and cruelly tortured in order to make her apostatize, but she remained steadfast and was sent back to prison, where she died from the effects of the torture.

A church was built over her grave, besides which are two others at Toledo dedicated to her.

== Leocadia's Relics ==
She was buried in the local cemetery, near the Tagus, where soon a cult sprung around her grave. It is thought that a basilica was built in the fourth century, improved upon in 618 by Sisebut. The seventh century saw a flourishing of her cult.

During the reign of Alfonso X of Castile, the prison where she is said to have been incarcerated still carried proof of her habitation. A contemporary witness records: "There still existed, and we touched it, a sign of the cross impressed in the stone because the martyr constantly touched the walls with her fingers that sign of our redemption."

During the ninth century, her relics were moved during the persecutions of Abd ar-Rahman II. They were moved to Oviedo; Alfonso the Chaste erected a basilica there in her honor. In the eleventh century, a Count of Hainault arrived in Spain as a pilgrim to Compostela. He fought alongside Alfonso VI of Castile in campaigns of the Reconquista, and received in recompense the relics of Saint Leocadia and Saint Sulpicius. Thus, her relics were taken out of Spain.

Her relics were known to have been located at the Benedictine abbey of Saint-Ghislain, in present-day Belgium.

Her relics were venerated there by Philip the Handsome and Joanna of Castile, who recovered for Toledo a tibia of the saint. The abbey of Saint-Ghislain suffered depredations in the wars of the 16th century. Fernando Álvarez de Toledo, 3rd Duke of Alba attempted unsuccessfully to rescue the rest of her relics. However, a Jesuit named Miguel Hernández, a native of Toledo Province, found her relics in 1583. After many travels, he brought them to Rome in 1586. They were brought to Valencia by sea, and then finally brought to Toledo from Cuenca. Philip II of Spain presided over a solemn ceremony commemorating the final translation of her relics to Toledo, in April 1587.

The small town of Leocadia, near Samaraes, between Braga and Guimarães in Northern Portugal, is named after her.

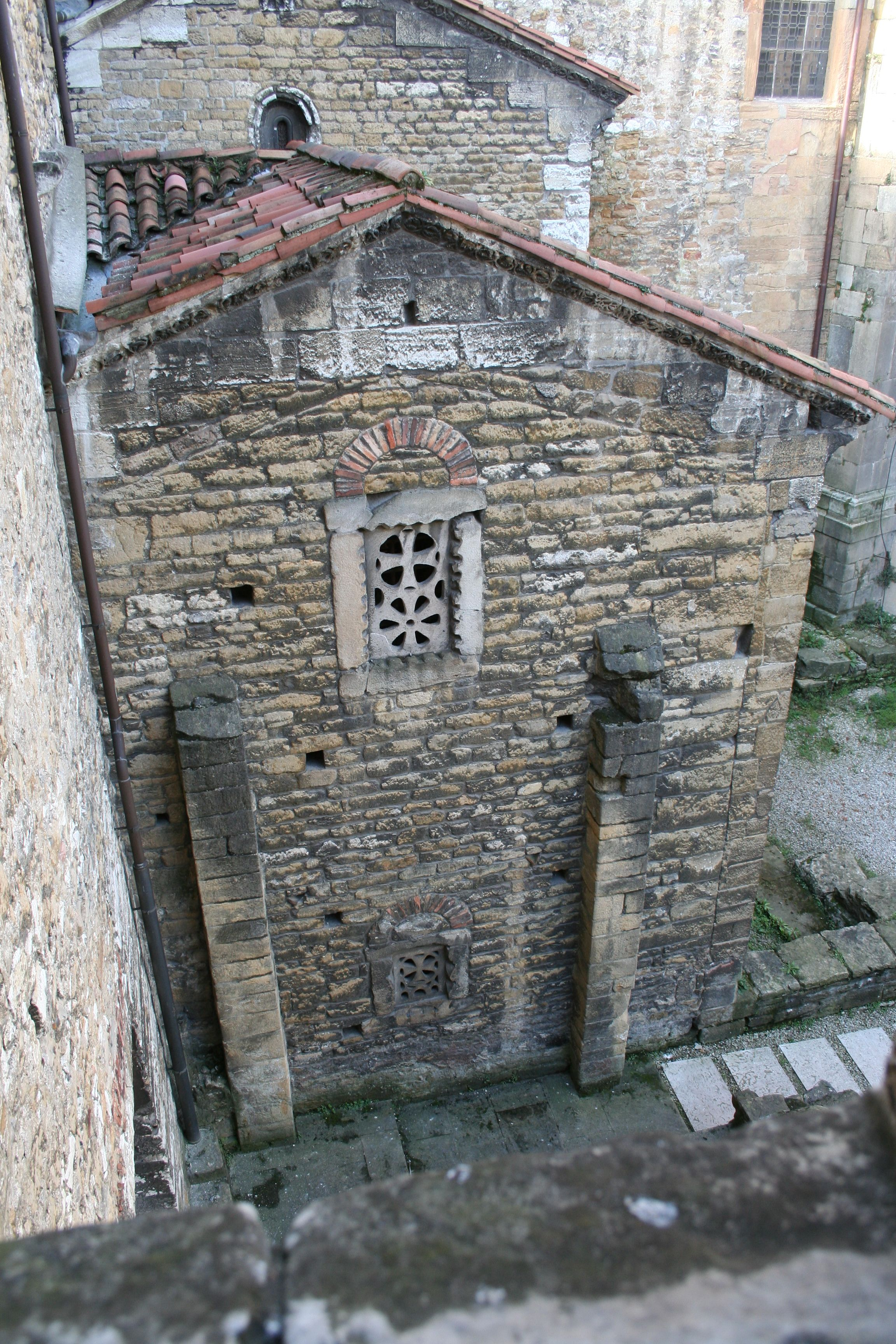
Exterior of the holy chamber of Saint Leocadia

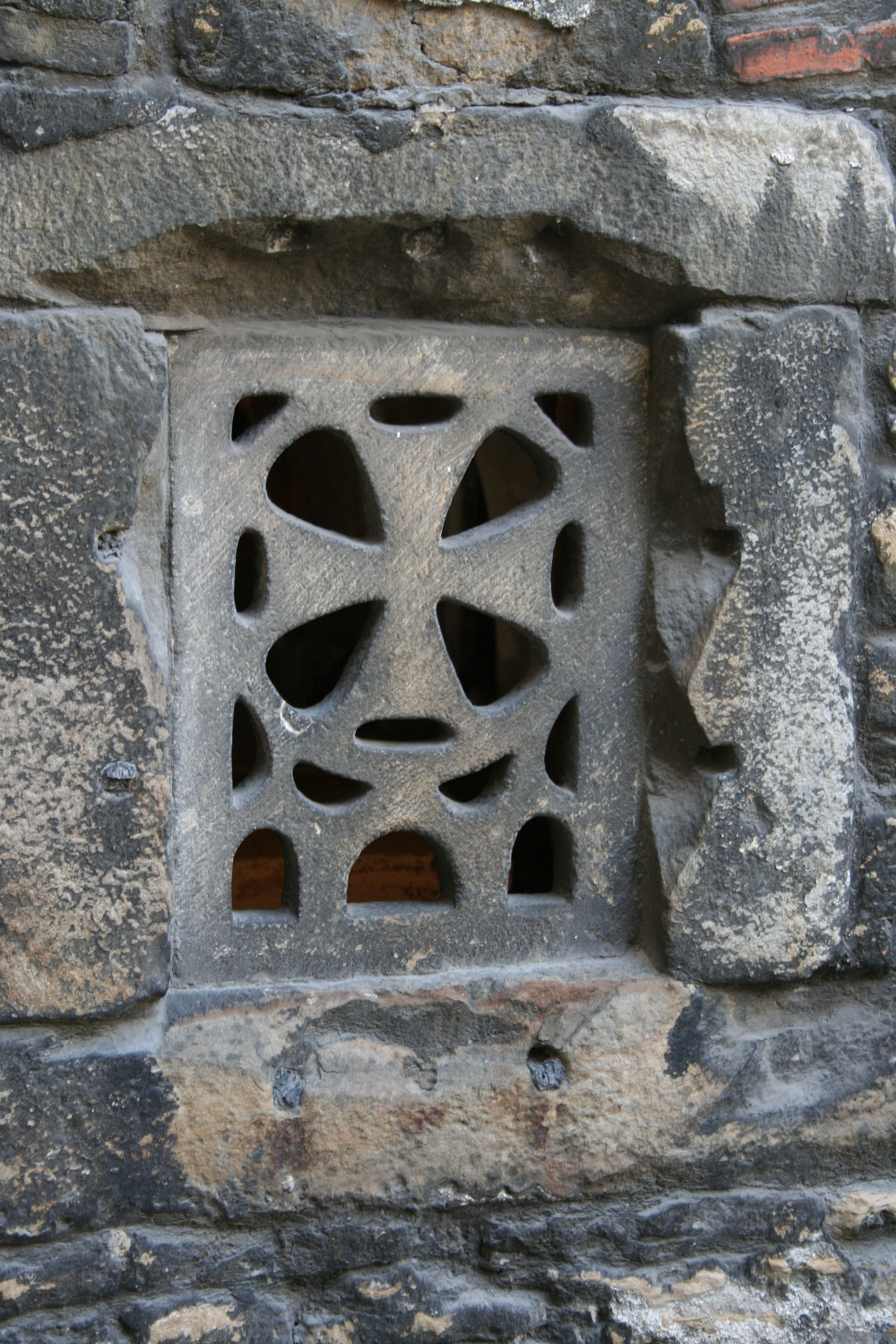
Lattice window of the crypt of Saint Leocadia

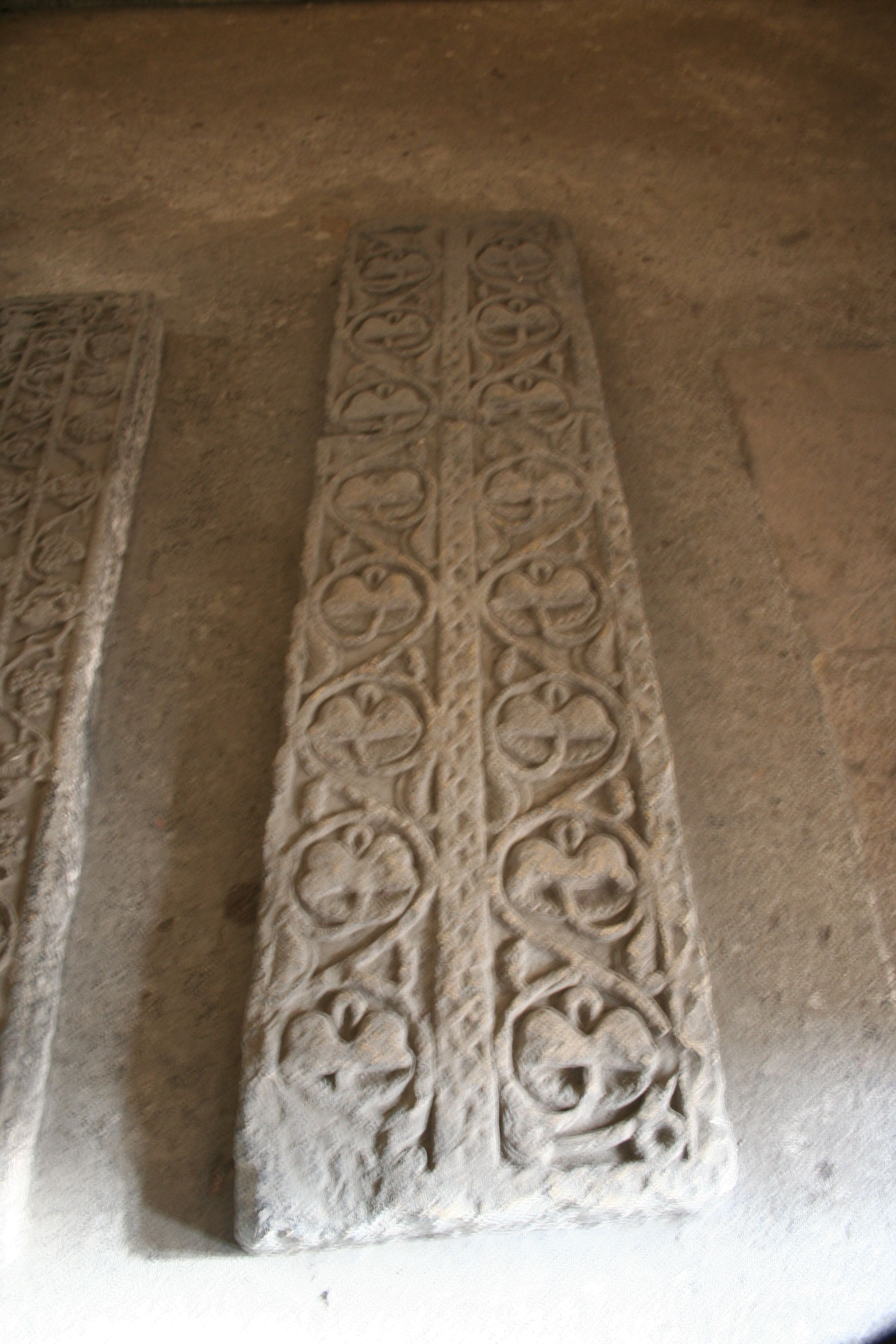
Lid of the central crypt
