= Councils of Toledo =

Synods held in present-day Toledo, Spain from the 5th-7th centuries

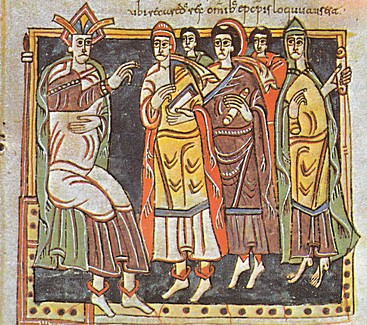
Reccared I and bishops. Council III of Toledo, 589. Códice Vigilano, fol. 145, Biblioteca del Escorial.

From the 5th century to the 7th century AD, about thirty synods, variously counted, were held at Toledo (Concilia toletana) in what would come to be part of Spain. The earliest, directed against Priscillianism, assembled in 400. The "third" synod of 589 marked the epoch-making conversion of King Reccared from Arianism to Catholic Chalcedonian Christianity. The "fourth", in 633, probably under the presidency of the noted Isidore of Seville, regulated many matters of discipline and decreed uniformity of liturgy throughout the kingdom. The Britonia of Galicia accepted the Latin liturgical rite. The "twelfth" council in 681 assured to the archbishop of Toledo the primacy of Hispania (present Iberian Peninsula). As nearly one hundred early canons of Toledo found a place in the Decretum Gratiani, they exerted an important influence on the development of ecclesiastical law.

The later synod of 1565 and 1566 concerned itself with the execution of the decrees of Trent; and the last council of Toledo, that of 1582 and 1583, was so guided in detail by Philip II that the pope ordered the name of the royal commissioner to be expunged from the acts.

The seventh century is sometimes called, by Spanish historians, the Siglo de Concilios, or "Century of Councils".

== Councils ==
- First Council of Toledo (400)
- Council of Toledo of 447 (447)
- Second Council of Toledo (527)
- Third Council of Toledo (589)
- Fourth Council of Toledo (633)
- Fifth Council of Toledo (636)
- Sixth Council of Toledo (638)
- Seventh Council of Toledo (644)
- Eighth Council of Toledo (653)
- Ninth Council of Toledo (655)
- Tenth Council of Toledo (656)
- Eleventh Council of Toledo (675)
- Twelfth Council of Toledo (681)
- Thirteenth Council of Toledo (683)
- Fourteenth Council of Toledo (684)
- Fifteenth Council of Toledo (688)
- Sixteenth Council of Toledo (693)
- Seventeenth Council of Toledo (694)
- Eighteenth Council of Toledo (ca. 702)

== Museum ==
In Toledo there is a museum which features the councils and other aspects of Visigothic culture, the Museo de los Concilios y de la Cultura Visigoda. It is housed in the church of San Roman.
