= Argiovito =

Bishop of Porto in Portugal in the sixth century

Argiovito, also referred to as Argiovitro, one Arbricio was bishop of Porto in Portugal during the late sixth century.

== Biography ==
Argiovito was an Arian bishop and was appointed to Porto in 585, when the Visigoth king Leovigild conquered the Suebi kingdom, decreed exile for all Catholic bishops who did not to accept conversion to Arianism and designated Arian prelates to occupy them. Bishop Constancio, who headquarters was Catholic before this date, refused to leave the diocese, and both lived together, each in their religion, but the persecution of Catholics ceased the following year with the Leovigild's death and with the succession of his son Reccared, newly converted to Catholicism. Argiovito was one of the bishops who abjured Arianism in the Third Council of Toledo, held in 589, embracing Catholicism. You may like other converts in the same situation will respect the dignity of bishop, although the jurisdiction fall on legitimate Bishop Constancio, and that happen to it after his death, or it may abandon the ecclesiastical state. Some authors suspect that Argiovito was the same person with the name of Argeverto or Argevato confirmed in Toledo Gundemaro decree of the year 610, in which the king granted to the diocese of Toledo the primacy over all others in the kingdom. Others mention them as two different characters.

== Sources ==
- Rodrigo da Cunha, https://books.google.com/books?id=AD_kAAAAMAAJ&pg=PA58, chap. V and VI (1623).
- Enrique Flórez, https://books.google.com/books?id=NDLvzyToHzoC&pg=PA25, vol. XXI, p. 25-28 (1766).
- Bernardo de Brito, https://books.google.com/books?id=jV5JAAAAcAAJ&pg=PT397, Book VI, chap. XIX.
- Vicente de la Fuente, https://books.google.com/books?id=eA3MASnGYX4C&pg=PA243, vol I, p. 243.
- José de Sousa Amado, https://books.google.com/books?id=KAdCAAAAYAAJ&pg=PA177, p. 177-178.
- Luis Agustín García Moreno, https://books.google.com/books?id=jZ3dQmQtObgC&hl=es&pg=PA164, p. 164.
