= Ninth Council of Toledo =

The Ninth Council of Toledo was a provincial synod of bishops of Carthaginiensis. It began on 2 November 655 under the auspices of King Reccesuinth. It ended on November 24 in the Church of Santa María.

It was attended by only sixteen or seventeen bishops, six abbots, two dignitaries, and four counts of the palace. The bishops promulgated seventeen canons about the honesty of the clergy, the property of the church, and clerical celibacy. The council closed by scheduling another synod for 1 November 655, but the Tenth Council of Toledo, a general council, was called first and the planned provincial synod never met.

The council authorised bishops to transfer up to a third of the income of any church in their diocese to any other church of their choosing. The council decided that if a cleric, from subdeacon to bishop, had a child by a woman, free or slave, that child became automatically a slave of the church in which his father served. No freed male or female ecclesiastic was allowed to marry a freeman (Hispano-Roman or Visigoth) and if one did, the children of such a union were enslaved to the church.

The council gave a layman the privilege of Jus patronatus for each church he built, but the founder had no proprietary rights.

Finally, the synod declared that all conversos, not only converted Jews also others who had come during the Migration Period, had to pass Christian festivals in the presence of their bishop so as to prove the veracity of their faith. Lack of compliance with this last rule resulted in flogging or forced fasting, depending on the age of the offender.

== Sources ==
- Thompson, E. A. (1969), The Goths in Spain, Oxford: Clarendon Press.
- Synodus Toletana nona, minutes from the Collectio Hispana Gallica Augustodunensis (Vat. lat. 1341)
