= Third Council of Toledo =

589 synod in which Visigothic Spain entered the Catholic Church

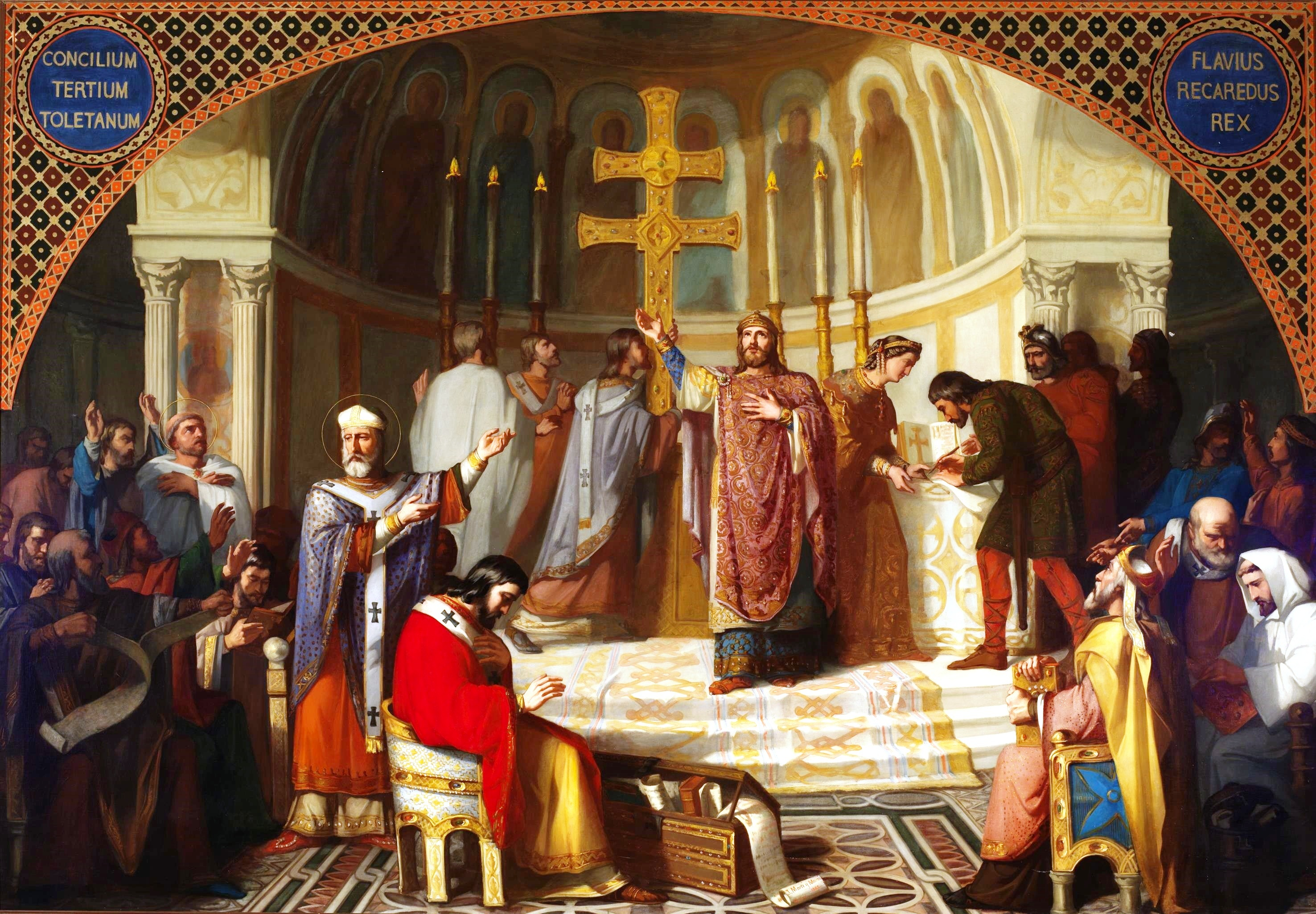
- Reccared I and St Isidore of Seville at Toledo
- Date: 589
- Accepted by: Catholic Church
- Previous council: Second Council of Toledo
- Next council: Fourth Council of Toledo
- Convoked by: Reccared I
- President: Leander of Seville
- Attendance: 72 bishops
- Topics: Rejection of Arianism by the Visigoths, transference of the Arian bishops and clerics to their respective Catholic dioceses. Jews and their relationship with Christian society.
- Location: Toledo

The Third Council of Toledo (589) marks the entry of Visigothic Spain into the Catholic Church, and is known for codifying the filioque clause into Western Christianity. The council also enacted restrictions on Jews, and the conversion of the country to Catholic Christianity led to repeated conflict with the Jews.

== Arian Goths ==
In the 4th century, the bishop Wulfila (c 310 – 383) invented a script for the Gothic language, translated the Bible into Gothic, and converted the Goths to Arian Christianity. When the Visigoths traveled west, they encountered Latin Christians, for whom Arianism was anathema. The Visigoths held to their Arian beliefs and refused to join the Catholic Church.

== Attempts to unify ==
Prior to the Council in Toledo, King Reccared had convened informal assemblies of bishops to resolve the religious schism in his kingdom. At the second assembly both Arian and Catholic bishops presented their arguments, while Reccared pointed out that no Arian bishop had ever performed a healing miracle. The last assembly consisted of only Catholic bishops, whereupon Reccared accepted the Catholic faith.

== Bishop Leander and King Reccared ==
The Council was organized by Bishop Leander of Seville, who had worked tirelessly to convert the Arian Visigothic kings and had succeeded with Reccared. Abbot Eutropius had the chief day-to-day management of the council, according to the chronicler John of Biclaro. In the king's name, Leander brought together bishops and nobles in May of 589. However, King Reccared and Bishop Leander were able to persuade only eight Arian bishops to attend the council.

== Council proceedings ==
=== Opening ===
The Council opened on May 4, with three days of prayer and fasting. Then, the public confession of King Reccared was read aloud by a notary. Its theological precision defining Trinitarian and Arian tenets, establishing Reccared's newly achieved orthodoxy, and its extensive quotation from scripture revealed that it was in fact ghostwritten for the king, doubtless by Leander.

=== Declarations ===
In it, Reccared declared that God had inspired him to lead the Goths back to the true faith, from which they had been led astray by false teachers. (In fact they had been Christianized by the Arian Ulfilas, but Leander's theme was reconciliation.) He declared that not only the Goths but the Suebi, who by the fault of others had been led into heresy, had been brought back to the faith. These nations he dedicated to God by the hands of the bishops, whom he called on to complete the work. He then anathematized Arius and his doctrine, and declared his acceptance of the councils of Nicaea, Constantinople, Ephesus, Chalcedon and pronounced an anathema on all who returned to Arianism after being received into the Church by the chrism, or the laying on of hands; then followed the creeds of Nicaea and Constantinople and the definition of Chalcedon, and the tome concluded with the signatures of Reccared and Baddo his queen. This confession was received with a general acclamation.

One of the Catholic bishops then called on the assembled bishops, clergy, and Gothic nobles to declare publicly their renunciation of Arianism and their acceptance of Chalcedonian Christianity. They replied that although they had done so already when they had gone over with the king to the Church, they would comply.

=== Anathemas ===
Then followed 23 anathemas directed against Arius and his doctrines, succeeded by the creeds of Nicaea and Constantinople and the definition of Chalcedon, the whole being subscribed by 8 Arian bishops with their clergy, and by all the Gothic nobles. The bishops were Ugnas of Barcelona, Ubiligisclus of Valencia, Murila of Palencia, Sunnila of Viseu, Gardingus of Tuy, Bechila of Lugo, Argiovitus of Porto, and Froisclus of Tortosa. The names of the eight are Germanic in origin. Four come from sees within the former kingdom of the Suebi, probably showing that Leovigild, after his conquest, had displaced the Catholic bishops by Arians.

=== Canons ===
Reccared then instructed the council with his licence to draw up any requisite canons, particularly one directing the creed to be recited at Communion, so that henceforward no one could plead ignorance as an excuse for misbelief. Then followed 23 canons with a confirmatory edict of the king.

- The 1st confirmed the decrees of previous councils of the Catholic Church and synodical letters of the popes;
- the 2nd directed the recitation of the creed of Constantinople at Holy Communion, with the addition of the Filioque clause: Credo in Spiritum Sanctum qui ex patre filioque procedit ("I believe in the Holy Spirit who proceeds from the Father and Son") which was never accepted in the Christian East and led to drawn-out controversy; some believe this to be a result of residual Semi-Arian heresy that was refuted at the First Council of Constantinople
- the 5th forbade the converted Arian bishops, priests, and deacons to live with their wives;
- the 7th directed that the Scriptures should be read at a bishop's table during meals;
- the 9th transferred Arian churches to the bishops of their dioceses;
- the 13th forbade clerics to proceed against other clerics before lay tribunals;
- the 14th forbade Jews to have Christian wives, concubines, or slaves, ordered the children of such unions to be baptized, and disqualified Jews from any office in which they might have to punish Christians. Christian slaves whom they had circumcised, or made to share in their rites, were ipso facto freed;
- the 21st forbade civil authorities to lay burdens on clerics or the slaves of the church or clergy;
- the 22nd forbade wailing at funerals;
- the 23rd forbade celebrating the eves of Saint's days with dances and songs, characterized as "indecent".

The canons were subscribed first by the king, then by 5 of the 6 metropolitans, of whom Masona signed first; 62 bishops signed in person, 6 by proxy. All those of Tarraconensis and Septimania appeared personally or by proxy; in other provinces several were missing.

=== Closing ===
The proceedings closed with a triumphant homily by Leander on the conversion of the Goths, preserved by his brother Isidore as Homilia de triumpho ecclesiae ob conversionem Gothorum a homily upon the "triumph of the Church and the conversion of the Goths."

== Effects of the council ==
The proscriptions against Jews were soon followed by required conversions, which led to a wholesale flight of Jews from Visigothic Spain to Ceuta and technically Visigothic nearby territories in North Africa. There, a community of exiles and malcontents formed, that were later to provide useful alliance and information at the time of the Moorish invasion in 711.

The filioque clause spread through the Latin-literate West but not through the Greek-speaking East. The Franks adopted it, but its use caused controversy in the 9th century. Its use spread to Rome soon after 1000, and it contributed to the Great Schism (1054) between the Eastern Orthodox and Catholics.

== Sources ==
- Thompson, E. A. (1969) The Goths in Spain. Oxford: Clarendon Press.
- Synodus Toletana tertia, minutes from the Collectio Hispana Gallica Augustodunensis (Vat. lat. 1341)

== See also ==
- Argiovito, one of the bishops who abjured Arianism in the Third Council of Toledo
