= Twelfth Council of Toledo =

Synod convened by Visigothic King Erwig in 681 AD

The Twelfth Council of Toledo, held in Toledo, Spain, was initiated on 9 January 681 by the Visigothic King Erwig, who was elected king in 680. One of its first actions was to release the population from the laws of Wamba and recognise Erwig, anathematising all who opposed him.

The Council was attended by thirty eight bishops, four abbots, and five palatine officials. It recognised the right of the metropolitan archbishop of Toledo to consecrate all bishops appointed by the king, even if they were outside his own province. Thus was born the primacy of the Toledan diocese over all Spain.

The council implemented various measures against the Jews, enacting against them twenty-eight laws. The bishops ordered the reading in all the churches of the canons against the Jews and conserved all acts of abjuration and conversion of Jews, prohibiting conversos from returning to Judaism. The canons were first read in the church of Santa María in Toledo on 27 January. Otherwise, the persecution of Jews was isolated to confiscation of goods.

The council, at the request of Erwig, revised the Forum Iudicum of Reccesuinth to right perceived injustices and contradictions. The revised law came into effect on 21 October. Laws against violence to slaves were suppressed. The general trend of all modifications and new legislation was in favour of the nobles and their privileges.

In religious matters, the bishops dealt with penance, death, excommunication, the number of sees, the election of bishops, the mass, and clerical discipline. The nomination of bishops by the kings was forbidden (despite tacit recognition of it in fact). The date of provincial synods was fixed on 1 November every year. The previous date had been in May, since the Fourth Council. The provinces were ordered to hold at least one synod each year. The church of Galicia was sanctioned in its treatment of slaves (see Tenth Council of Toledo) and the extant paganism of the province condemned.

The short council terminated on 25 January.

== Sources ==
- Thompson, E. A. (1969) The Goths in Spain. Oxford: Clarendon Press.
- Falsified minutes from the Council from the IXth century by Benedictus Levita: Concilium Toletanum duodecimum, in the Collectio Hispana Gallica Augustodunensis (Vat. lat. 1341)
