= Fifth Council of Toledo =

Catholic church council held in Toledo in 636

The Fifth Council of Toledo was convoked by King Chintila and opened on 30 June 636 in the church of Saint Leocadia in Toledo. It was attended by twenty two bishops and two episcopal representatives. The bishops of Narbonensis were absent for political reasons. It primarily dealt with political matters.

The council's first act was to grant special protection to the persons of the king and his family. As to this and royal elections the council made the following decrees:

- Only the higher nobility (with military functions) and the Visigothic palatine officials could participate in royal elections.
- The descendants of the king had the right to enjoy properties justly acquired by the king and willed to them. Anathema was pronounced on those who molested or injured the king. The closest councillors of the king were also protected in their possession of properties granted them by their royal patron.
- Those who consulted seers to know the future of the king, who cursed the king, or who plotted or conspired to place another on the throne would be excommunicated. Those who aspired to the throne without due election were also anathematised.
- The council established three days of litanies between 13 and 15 December each year.

The councils decrees, however, failed in their chief political aim of securing the king on his throne and putting an end to internal intrigues. Chintila continued to have to fight dissenters while Spain was otherwise at peace with the outside world. In 638, Chintila was forced to convoke the Sixth Council of Toledo.

== Sources ==
- Thompson, E. A. (1969) The Goths in Spain. Oxford: Clarendon Press.
- Concilium Toletanum quintum, minutes from the Collectio Hispana Gallica Augustodunensis (Vat. lat. 1341)
