= Sixth Council of Toledo =

The Sixth Council of Toledo was the second council convoked by King Chintila and opened on 9 January 638 in the church of St. Leocadia in Toledo. It was attended by fifty three bishops, including those from Narbonensis who had not participated in the prior council for political reasons. The council was thus a reunion of the whole church of Spain (of both Hispania and Gallia). Its primary purpose was to reaffirm the decrees of the Fifth Council of 636 and to restore internal peace.

Four of the nineteen canons of the council were specifically political, the rest covered Jews, monks, penitents, freedmen, holy orders, benefices, and ecclesiastical property.

The council affirmed the Fifth Council's decrees about the security of the king and his family. It also excommunicated those who fled overseas and there plotted against the king or otherwise endangered him. Anathema was pronounced on all who attacked the king or conspired to overthrow him and usurp his throne. A successor to an assassinated king was dishonoured if he did not punish the regicides.

The council confirmed the permanent possession of property given to the church by anyone and laid down punishments for simony. Finally, certain measures were first taken against the Jews, it seems to please the pope, who had demanded them in a letter.

== Sources ==
- Thompson, E. A. (1969) The Goths in Spain. Oxford: Clarendon Press.
- Concilium Toletanum sextum, minutes from the Collectio Hispana Gallica Augustodunensis (Vat. lat. 1341)
