= Lampius =

Barcelona bishop (393–400)

Lampius (Catalan: Lampi; Spanish: Lampio) (died 400 AD) was bishop of Barcelona from 393 to 400 AD. He is best remembered for being responsible for the ordination of Saint Paulinus of Nola on Christmas, 393 AD, in the cathedral of Barcelona. He also attended the First Council of Toledo.
