= Tenth Council of Toledo =

The Tenth Council of Toledo was summoned to meet in Toledo on 1 December 656 by King Reccesuinth of Hispania.

In November 655, the bishops of Carthaginiensis had held a provincial synod in Toledo, the Ninth Council of Toledo. They scheduled a second council for 1 November the next year, but a general council was called by the king. The tenth council was attended by only seventeen bishops and five deputies from Carthaginiensis and Gallaecia. The metropolitan of Toledo, Eugenius II, joined by his fellow metropolitans, Fugitivus of Seville and Potamius of Braga, attended from Baetica, but no bishops came from Tarraconensis or Gallia Narbonensis. This made it the most poorly attended of the great general councils of the Siglo de Concilios (7th century).

The council declared that all clerical oathbreakers were to be defrocked and/or exiled, leaving it up to the king to decide whether both punishments were necessary. The council also expelled from the family of the church, all clerics of all ranks who, in the future, were caught trading Christian slaves with Jews. The bishops further worked to ameliorate conflicts within the church and enforce ecclesiastical discipline. Potamius of Braga admitted to carnal sins and was retired to a monastery, replaced by Fructuosus, whose old see of Dumio had its own conflict. The last will and testament of the recently deceased bishop of Dumium, Riccimer, was disputed by those who saw his freeing of slaves and distribution of monies to the poor without compensation as responsible for the subsequent impoverishment of that see. It was given to his successor (Fructuosus) to decide exactly what to do, but his actions without compensation were considered unlawful.

The council closed and Reccesuinth did not call another for the rest of his reign; he died on 1 September 672.

As an aside, it is possible that the later King Wamba was summoned to produce the will of St Martin of Braga by Reccesuinth.

== Sources ==
- Thompson, E. A. (1969), The Goths in Spain, Oxford: Clarendon Press.
- Synodus Toletana decima, minutes from the Collectio Hispana Gallica Augustodunensis (Vat. lat. 1341)
