= First Council of Toledo =

The First Council of Toledo was held at Toledo, Spain, in September of 400. The council was assembled under Archbishop Patronus with its primary purpose to condemn the Priscillian heresy, to receive back Priscillians, and uphold the Nicene Creed. Eighteen other Hispanic bishops participated, including Lampius, bishop of Barcelona. Many Priscillians were readmitted into the Catholic Church, notably Priscillian bishop Dictinnius. The council also reformed the clergy. Twenty canons were published by this council. It would be another 47 years before a council met again in Toledo.

== Canons of the First Council of Toledo ==
The following text is taken from Charles-Joseph Hefele's English translation of the Canons of the First Council of Toledo, in the public domain:

1. Those deacon or priests who, before the law of celibacy was published by the Lusitanian bishops, have had intercourse with their wives, shall not be promoted to higher posts.
2. A penitent shall not be received among the clergy.
3. A reader (lector) who marries a widow can at the most only become a sub-deacon.
4. A sub-deacon who, after the death of his wife, marries a second time, shall be degraded to the office of an ostiarius or reader, and may not read the epistle and gospel. But if he marries a third time (quod nec dicendum aut audiendum est) he must do penance for two years, and even then, after being reconciled, may only communicate with the laity.
5. Every cleric must daily attend divine service.
6. A virgin dedicated to God shall hold no communication with men with whom she is not nearly related, especially not with a reader or confessor (= cantor). (Note: "Confiteri" is often used in the Holy Scriptures for "Dei laudes decantare" and hence "confessor" comes to mean "cantor;" cf. Du Cango, Glossar.)
7. If the wife of a cleric sins, her husband shall keep her in confinement, and impose fasts and the like upon her.
8. Those who have served in war may become clerics, but may not be raised to the diaconate.
9. A virgin dedicated to God, or a widow, may not, in absence of the bishop, sing the Antiphons at home in company with her servants or a confessor. (Note: See canon 6.) Neither may the Lucernarium (vespers) be held without a bishop, priest, or deacon. (Note: On the "Licernarium," cf. the notes of Binius in Mansi, t. iii. p. 1016.)
10. Clerics who are not entirely free may not be ordained without the consent of their patrons.
11. If a powerful man plunders a clergyman, monk, or poor person, and refuses to answer for it to the bishop, letters shall be at once addressed to all the bishops of the province; and any others who are in any way accessible, so that the person in question may everywhere be treated as excommunicate, until he has submitted and given back the stolen property. (Note: Cf. Kober, Kirchenbann, 1863, pp. 192 sq.)
12. A cleric may not forsake his bishop to take service with another.
13. Those who never communicate in the church shall be shut out.
14. Those who do not really consume the Holy Eucharist which they have received from the priest, shall be treated as "sacrilegious."
15. No one may hold intercourse (have communications or dealings) with an excommunicated person.
16. If a virgin dedicated to God falls (into sexual sin), she can only be readmitted to communion after ten years of penance. The same punishment is incurred by the partner of her guilt. But if such a virgin marries, she can only be admitted to penance on her giving up conjugal intercourse with her husband.
17. If a Christian has a believing wife and also a concubine, he may not be admitted to communion; but if he has no wife and only one concubine, he may be admitted. (Note: In Roman law, concubinatus was a respectable monogamous alternative to marriage. Though not necessarily permanent, it was meant to be a commitment of some duration, though without an intention to have children. Reasons for entering into concubinatus varied. Widowers of the highest rank might simplify family relations by taking a concubina instead of a second wife; younger men might have a concubina, as St. Augustine did, before they were ready to settle into a career and marriage. In early Christianity, upper-class Christian women might have to choose between marrying non-Christian men of their own social rank or concubinatus with Christian men of lower standing. For reasons that are unclear, many former slaves who rose to the middle class also took concubinae instead of marrying.)
18. If the widow of a bishop, priest, or deacon marries a second time, she shall be shut out from the Church, and may only receive the sacrament on her deathbed.
19. If the daughter of a bishop, priest, or deacon, who has dedicated herself to God, sins and marries, her parents may no longer hold any intercourse [communications or dealings] with her, and she herself shall be excommunicated, and may only receive the sacrament on her deathbed.
20. Only a bishop, not a priest, may consecrate the chrism (and he may do so on any day); but before Easter, deacons or sub-deacons shall fetch the chrism from him.

== Sources ==
- Thompson, E. A. The Goths in Spain. Oxford: Clarendon Press, 1969.
- Concilium Toletanum primum, minutes from the Collectio Hispana Gallica Augustodunensis (Vat. lat. 1341) from the Edition of forged collection of capitularies of Benedictus Levita (Edition der falschen Kapitularien des Benedictus Levita).
