= Second Council of Toledo =

The Second Council of Toledo was held by 8 bishops of the Visigothic Kingdom of Toledo in the city of Toledo in 527 or 531, under the presidency of Montanus (Montà), the metropolitan bishop of Toledo. The chief issue with which the synod dealt was Arianism. This council was the first in which Toledo was identified as a metropolitan see. Five new canons were decreed.

== Canons of the Second Council of Toledo ==
The following is a paraphrase taken from Charles-Joseph Hefele's English translation of the Canons of the Second Council of Toledo, in the public domain:

1. Those who, as children, were dedicated by their parents to the clerical office shall, soon after receiving the tonsure, or after admission to the office of lector, be instructed by one set over them in a building belonging to the Church, under the eyes of the bishop. If they have reached the age of eighteen, the bishop should ask them whether they wish to marry. If they choose celibacy, and vow its observance then shall they be dedicated to the sweet yoke of the Lord, at twenty years of age as subdeacons, and, if they are worthy, as deacons after the completion of their twenty-fifth year. Yet care must be taken that they do not, unmindful of their vow, contract matrimony, or practise secret cohabitation. If they do this, they must, as guilty of sacrilege, be excommunicated. If, however, at the time that the bishop asks them they declare their intention to enter into matrimony, the permission granted by the apostle (1 Corinthians 7:2, 7:9) shall not be withheld from them. If in more advanced years they, as married, with the consent of the other partner, take a vow of abstinence from the works of the flesh, then they may rise to the sacred offices.
2. If anyone is thus educated from his youth for one church, he must not go even to another, and no strange bishop must receive such an one.
3. No cleric, from a subdeacon onwards, may live along with a woman, be she free, freed, or a slave. Only a mother, or a sister, or a near relation is allowed to take care of his house. If he has no near relation, then the woman who takes care of the house must live in another house, and under no pretext enter his dwelling. Whoever acts in opposition to this shall not only lose his clerical office and the doors of the church be closed, but he shall be excluded from the communion of all Catholics, of laymen also, even from speech with them.
4. If a cleric has laid out, on ground belonging to the Church, vineyards or small fields for his own sustenance, he may retain them to the end of his life, but then they fall to the Church; and he must not dispose of them by testament to anyone, unless the bishop allows it.
5. No Christian is allowed to marry a blood-relation.

== Sources ==
- Thompson, E. A. (1969) The Goths in Spain, Oxford: Clarendon Press.
- Synodus Toletana secunda, minutes from the Collectio Hispana Gallica Augustodunensis (Vat. lat. 1341)
