= Priscillianism =

Christian sect in Roman Spain

Priscillianism was a Christian sect developed in the Roman province of Hispania in the 4th century by Priscillian. It is derived from the Gnostic doctrines taught by Marcus, an Egyptian from Memphis. Priscillianism was later considered a heresy by both the Eastern Orthodox Church and the Catholic Church.

== History ==
Marcus, a native of Memphis in Egypt, came to Spain and taught Gnostic theories. Two of his followers, a Spanish woman named Agape and the rhetorician Helpidius, converted Priscillian, who was a layman "of noble birth, of great riches, bold, restless, eloquent, learned through much reading, very ready at debate and discussion". Through his oratorical gifts and reputation for extreme asceticism, Priscillian attracted a large following, including Helpidus and two bishops, Instantius and Salvianus.

They established a new sect as an oath-bound society, attracting the attention of the bishop Hyginus of Cordoba. Hyginus made his fears known to Hydatius, Bishop of Emerita, and Ithacius of Ossonoba. The bishops of Hispania and Aquitaine held a synod at Zaragoza in 380. Though summoned, the Priscillianists refused to appear. The synod pronounced sentence of excommunication against the four leaders, Instantius, Salvianus, Helpidius and Priscillian.

Ithacius was chosen to enforce the synod's decrees, but he failed to bring the heretics to terms. In defiance Priscillian was ordained to the priesthood and appointed Bishop of Avila. Ithacius then appealed to the imperial authorities. The emperor Gratian issued a decree which deprived the Priscillianists of their churches and sentenced them to exile. Instantius, Salvianus and Priscillian proceeded to Rome to gain the aid of Pope Damasus I (also from Hispania) in having this sentence revoked. On their journey they were joined by many supporters from Gaul, including a large number of women mentioned in contemporary sources. Reports of improper behavior by their followers and benefactors – possibly fabricated – were circulated against them.

Denied an audience by Pope Damasus, they went to Milan to make a similar request of St. Ambrose, but with the same result. They then resorted to intrigue and bribery at the court with such success that they were not only freed from the sentence of exile, but permitted to regain possession of their churches in Hispania, where, under the patronage of the imperial officials, they enjoyed such power as to compel Ithacius to leave the country. He, in turn, appealed to Gratian, but before anything had been accomplished the emperor was murdered in Lyon, and Magnus Maximus had taken his place.

Maximus treated the matter not as one of ecclesiastical rivalry, but as one of morality and society. As he wished to curry favour with the orthodox bishops and to replenish his treasury through confiscations, the Emperor gave orders for a synod, which was held in Bordeaux in 384. Instantius was first tried and condemned to deposition. Priscillian appealed to the emperor at Trier. Ithacius acted as his accuser and was so vehement in his denunciations that St. Martin of Tours, who was then in Trier, intervened. After expressing his disapproval of bringing an ecclesiastical case before a civil tribunal, he obtained from the emperor a promise not to carry his condemnation to the extent of shedding blood.

After St. Martin had left the city, the emperor appointed the prefect Evodius as judge. He found Priscillian and some others guilty of the crime of magic. This decision was reported to the emperor, who ordered the execution of Priscillian and several of his followers. The property of others was confiscated and they were banished. The conduct of Ithacius was severely criticized. St. Martin, hearing what had taken place, returned to Trier and compelled the emperor to rescind an order to military tribunes, who were on their way to Hispania to extirpate the heresy. The Church did not invoke civil authority to punish heretics. The pope censured not only the actions of Ithacius but also that of the emperor. St. Ambrose was equally stern in his denunciation of the case. Some of the Gallican bishops, who were in Trier under the leadership of Theognistus, broke off communion with Ithacius. He was subsequently deposed from his see by a synod of Hispanic bishops, and his friend and abettor Hydatius was compelled to resign.

After the executions of Priscillian and his followers by the emperor, however, the numbers and zeal of the heretics increased. In 400 another synod was held in Toledo to deal with this problem; many, including bishops Symphonius and Dictinnius, were reconciled to the Church through this synod. Dictinnius was the author of a book Libra (Scales), a moral treatise from the Priscillianist viewpoint. The upheaval in the Hispania due to the invasion of the Vandals, the Alans and the Suevi aided the spread of Priscillianism. Paulus Orosius, a Gallaecian priest from northwest Hispania, wrote to St. Augustine (415 CE) to enlist his aid in combating the heresy. Pope Leo I at a later date took active steps for its repression and at his urgent insistence, councils were held in 446 and 447 at Astorga, Toledo and Braga. In spite of these efforts, the sect continued to spread during the fifth century. In the following century it began to decline. After the First Council of Braga (561), which specifically targeted its doctrines, it soon died out.

== Teaching ==
The Priscillianists taught a Gnostic doctrine of dualism, a belief in the existence of two kingdoms, one of Light and one of Darkness. Angels and the souls of men were said to be severed from the substance of the Deity. Human souls were intended to conquer the Kingdom of Darkness, but fell and were imprisoned in material bodies. Thus both kingdoms were represented in man. Their conflict was symbolized on the side of Light by the Twelve Patriarchs, heavenly spirits, who corresponded to certain of man's powers, and on the side of Darkness by the Signs of the Zodiac, the symbols of matter and the lower kingdom. The salvation of man consists in liberation from the domination of matter. The twelve heavenly spirits having failed to accomplish their release, the Saviour came in a heavenly body that appeared to be like that of other men. Through His doctrine and His apparent death, he released the souls of the men from the influence of earthly matter.

These doctrines could be harmonized with the teaching of Scripture only by a complex system of exegesis, rejecting conventional interpretations and relying on personal inspiration. The Priscillians respected most of the Old Testament but rejected the Creation story. They believed that several of the apocryphal Scriptures were genuine and inspired. Because the Priscillians believe that matter and nature were evil, they became ascetics and fasted on Sundays and Christmas Day. Because their doctrines were esoteric and exoteric, and because it was believed that men in general could not understand the higher paths, the Priscillianists, or at least those of them who were enlightened, were permitted to tell lies for the sake of a holy end. Augustine wrote a famous work, Contra Mendacium ("Against Lying"), in reaction to this doctrine.

== Writings and rediscovery ==
Some writings by Priscillian were accounted orthodox and were not burned. For instance, he divided the Pauline epistles (including the Epistle to the Hebrews) into a series of texts based on their theological points and wrote an introduction to each section. These "canons" survived in a form edited by Peregrinus. They contain a strong call to a life of personal piety and asceticism, including celibacy and abstinence from meat and wine. The charismatic gifts of all believers are equally affirmed. Study of scripture is urged. Priscillian placed considerable weight on the deuterocanonical books of the Bible, not as being inspired but as helpful in discerning truth and error; however, several of the books were considered to be genuine and inspired.

It was long thought that all the writings of Priscillian himself had perished, but in 1885, Georg Schepss discovered at the University of Würzburg eleven genuine tracts, published as Priscilliani quae supersunt [What remains of Priscillian], edited by Georg Schepss (Corpus scriptorum ecclesiasticorum latinorum, 18), Vienna, 1889. Though they bear Priscillian's name, four describing Priscillian's trial appear to have been written by a close follower.

According to Raymond Brown's Epistle of John, the source of the Comma Johanneum appears to be the Latin book Liber Apologeticus by Priscillian.

== Zoroastrian influence ==
The potential influence of Zoroastrian thought on Priscillianism remains a matter of scholarly debate. While direct evidence of Persian religious influence in 4th-century Hispania is limited, several scholars have identified theological parallels between Priscillianist and Zoroastrian concepts.

=== Contemporary accusations ===
Jerome, in his Letter to Ctesiphon, provides one of the most direct contemporary sources linking Priscillianism to Zoroastrian practices. Writing as part of a polemic against Pelagius and his followers, Jerome describes Priscillian as "a most devoted student of the magus Zoroaster" (Zoroastris magi studiosissimum) who "from a magus became bishop." This characterization appears within a catalog of heretical pairs, where Jerome positions Priscillian as a successor to Agape and Elpidius.

The connection to Zoroastrian practices in Jerome's account may have been influenced by Orosius' earlier report of Priscillian's interest in astrology.

=== Theological parallels ===
Analysis of the Würzburg Tractates identifies astrological elements in Priscillian's teachings that show similarities to Zoroastrian priestly traditions, particularly in their understanding of celestial bodies' spiritual significance. These elements demonstrate sophisticated cosmological frameworks that parallel Persian models.

The movement's dualistic tendencies, often criticized by orthodox Christians as Manichaean, may indicate earlier Zoroastrian influences. Burrus argues that while Priscillianism's dualism was less absolute than that found in Manichaeism, it shows distinct patterns that could suggest indirect Zoroastrian sources. The emphasis on the struggle between light and darkness in Priscillian's theology bears notable similarities to Zoroastrian concepts of cosmic conflict.

=== Historical context ===
Archaeological evidence from late Roman Hispania shows trading connections with the East, providing possible channels for Persian religious ideas.[8] However, Van Dam suggests that many of Priscillianism's apparently "eastern" elements could be explained by broader ascetic trends in late antique Christianity.

Jerome's association of Priscillian with Zoroastrian practices reflects a common late antique heresiological strategy of linking heterodox Christian movements to "eastern" or "Persian" influences. While this does not necessarily demonstrate direct Zoroastrian influence on Priscillianism, it shows that such connections were perceived or constructed by contemporary critics.

== See also ==
- Christian vegetarianism
