= Flavius Paulus =

7th-century Roman general and rebel

King of the East (Septimania & Tarraconensis)
- Reign: Spring – 3 September 673
- Predecessor: Hilderic? (Note: The Visigothic count Hilderic preceded Paulus as the leader of the uprising in Septimania, but it is not clear whether he proclaimed himself king.)
- Successor: Wamba (Visigothic Kingdom)
- Died: Before 683?

Paulus or Paul was a 7th-century Roman (Note: Specifically Hispano-Roman, though he would have self-identified and been identified by others simply as 'Roman'. Paulus being a Roman is assumed considering that his name was Roman and not Gothic.) general in service of the Visigothic Kingdom. In 673, Paulus accompanied the Visigothic king Wamba (r. 672–680) on a campaign against the Basques, but when news reached them of a revolt led by the count Hilderic in Septimania, the northernmost and easternmost province of the kingdom, Paulus was dispatched with a considerable contingent of troops to put down the rebellion. Upon arrival in Septimania, Paulus not only completely disregarded his mission, but made himself the leader of the rebels and was anointed as king. Paulus managed to cement his authority over Septimania and the neighbouring province of Tarraconensis through the size of his army, and possibly through the two provinces being among the last properly Romanised regions of the kingdom. Titling himself as 'king of the east' (rex orientalis), Paulus ruled from Narbonne and sought to break away from Visigothic central control.

Supported by not only his contingent of Visigothic troops, but also the local Gothic, Frankish, Gallo-Roman and Hispano-Roman populace in Septimania, as well as the local Jewish minority, Paulus' revolt threatened the future of the Visigothic Kingdom as he may have intended to eventually take over all of Hispania. After ruling in the northeast in opposition to Wamba for several months, Paulus was defeated and captured on 3 September 673. Wamba spared him the legal punishment for his actions, excommunication and death, instead only subjecting him to ritual humiliation in a triumph in Toledo, the Visigothic capital, and keeping him imprisoned. The nobles convicted of the 673 revolt were pardoned by Wamba's successor Erwig (r. 680–687) in 683, but Paulus may already have died by that point.

== Background ==
Given his name, it is probable that Paulus was of Hispano-Roman, rather than Gothic, origin. Paulus lived two centuries after the collapse of the Western Roman Empire, in a time when Roman identity was rapidly declining in Western Europe. In Paulus' time, the Goths and Romans formed two parallel populations within the Visigothic Kingdom, although the Romans are at this point in time mentioned less frequently in the sources than in earlier periods. Though the common societal structure in the barbarian kingdoms had previously been a nearly completely Roman civil administration and aristocracy and a near-completely barbarian military, individuals identified as Romans could at this time be generals in the armies of the Visigothic Kingdom. In the 580s, the dux Lusitaniae Claudius, explicitly identified as a Roman, aided the Visigothic king Reccared I (r. 586–601) in putting down a rebellion in Septimania.

The Visigothic monarchy was formally and traditionally elective, though in practice it most often abided by primogeniture, with the sons of previous kings usually inheriting power. Out of the majority of Visigothic kings, most either inherited power or took the throne through revolt. Though Romans were allowed significant posts in the military and in the civil administration, they were explicitly excluded from taking the Visigothic throne: Visigothic laws established that the king of the Visigoths had to be of Gothic noble origin. As in many other monarchies of its time, revolts by nobles aimed at deposing and replacing the Visigothic king were relatively common.

== Biography ==
=== Background ===
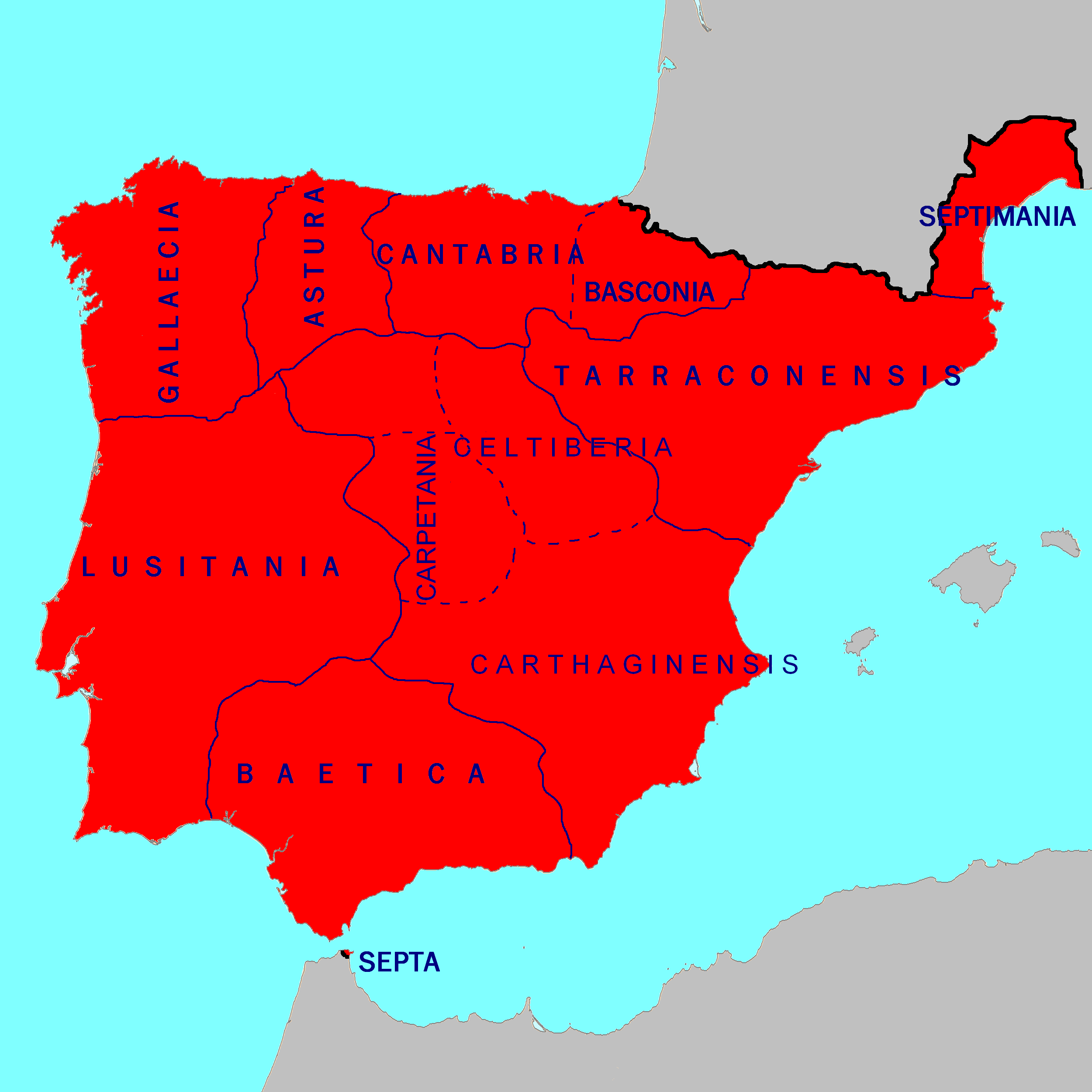
The Visigothic Kingdom and its provinces in AD 700

Paulus was a general in service of the Visigothic Kingdom. He served the Visigothic king Wamba (r. 672–680). Wamba, an elderly man, became king of the Visigoths in 672, being elected after the death of Recceswinth (r. 649–672) on account of his great prestige in the kingdom. Little is known of Wamba before he became king, but he must have been a distinguished courtier under Recceswinth and possibly a member of some important faction in the Visigothic nobility. Since Wamba lacked connections to previous Visigothic royalty, he wished to solidify his position on the throne with a military success, and thus in the spring of 673 marched against the Basques, who often descended from their mountains to plunder the northern lands of the kingdom. Alternatively, it is possible that the Basques had already began plundering Visigothic lands, in which case Wamba's campaign was a defensive engagement. While away on this campaign, Wamba learnt of rebellion in Septimania, the remaining territories held by the Visigoths in Gaul. The situation was serious given that it was not just a simple peasant revolt, but an uprising led by Hilderic, the governor of Nîmes, who might have proclaimed himself king. The reasons for this uprising are not entirely clear, but it might have simply had to with wishing to break free from Visigothic central control. Hilderic, like Wamba, was a Visigoth, and his main supporters were Gunhild, Bishop of Maguelonne, local Visigothic garrisons and forces, as well as the local Jewish minority, eager to aid in fighting against the oppressive religious policies imposed upon them by the Visigothic kings. Hilderic may also have reached out to the Basques, and possibly the Frankish Kingdom to the north, for further support.

Given that Hilderic did not control all of Septimania, and was thus not an immediate threat, Wamba and his advisors agreed that it was not necessary for them to halt their campaign against the Basques, but that the matter could be resolved by sending a smaller expeditionary force to deal with the uprising. They selected Paulus to lead the army to defeat Hilderic, the earliest surviving reference to Paulus' existence. (Note: Considering when he first appears, Paulus must also have initially accompanied Wamba on the campaign against the Basques. It is also possible that a count by the name of Paulus, attested as a signatory at both the Eighth (653) and Ninth (655) Councils of Toledo is the same person as Paulus.) Paulus was selected on account of his fighting expertise and bravery, and was appointed as dux Septimaniae. Leading a force of some thousands of men, Paulus left the Basque provinces for Septimania. On his way there, he met with the dux of Tarraconensis, Ranosindo, probably in Barcelona. The later rebellion of Paulus is among the best-recorded revolts in the Visigothic Kingdom, owing to detailed contemporary accounts by Julian of Toledo (642–690).

=== Rebellion and kingship ===
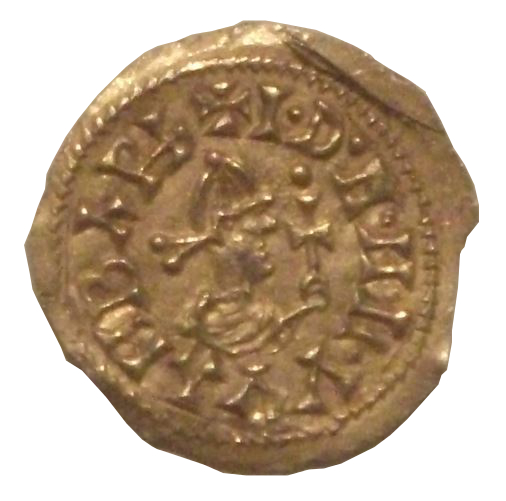
Coin of Wamba, king of the Visigoths (r. 672–680)

Upon arriving in Septimania, Paulus not only disobeyed Wamba's orders, but managed to become the leader of the rebels, being proclaimed king in opposition to Wamba, despite the laws against non-Gothic kings. Paulus was the first Roman to revolt against Visigothic rule since Petrus in the early 6th century, and the last recorded Roman rebel in the kingdom's history. Given his non-Gothic origin, the revolt threatened the future of Visigothic rule in Hispania. It is unknown what motivated Paulus to betray Wamba. The uprising was strengthened through Paulus being joined by the palace official Hildigisio and by Ranosindo of Barcelona. At Narbonne, Paulus summoned the heads of his army and prominent locals and induced them to elect him as king, owing to Wamba's "tyranny". The coronation of Paulus was carried out completely in-line with Visigothic coronation formalities. It was important that he was crowned at Narbonne, since this city was the seat of an Archbishop, and thus in religious terms of equal status as the Visigothic capital Toledo. Paulus was crowned with a golden votive crown that had been dedicated to the body of Saint Felix of Nîmes in Girona by the Visigothic king Reccared I, most likely being anointed by Archbishop Argebad. Though he might have proclaimed himself as king earlier, Hilderic for unknown reasons joined Paulus and accepted him as his ruler. Perhaps the most simple possible explanation for the wide support of Paulus was that the army he had brought with him was the only considerable military force in the region.

Wamba, who learned of Paulus' rebellion while still campaigned against the Basques, did not act against Paulus for a week, busy defeating the Basques, which allowed Paulus to consolidate his power further. Wamba divided his army into three groups, attacking over the Pyrenees by way of Llívia (then the capital of Cerdanya), Auch, and the coastal road. Aware that he could not defeat the Visigothic army alone, Paulus sent emissaries to foreign powers for aid. The Basques denied aid, as they were unwilling to incite further conflict with the Visigoths, and the Franks declined on account of internal division. Paulus even reached out to the Byzantine Empire in the east, though no aid could be sent on account of an impending Arab attack on Constantinople. Wamba swiftly recaptured Barcelona and camped by the Pyrenees, resting there for two days. At the Pyrenees, Wamba received a defiant letter from Paulus, wherein he proclaimed himself as rex orientalis (the "eastern king") and referred to Wamba as rex australis (the "southern king"), challenged Wamba to enter his domain and take his crown, and even challenged the Visigothic king to single combat. Paulus' letter to Wamba has an unclear sarcastic tone, with numerous animal comparisons, and reads as follows:

In the name of the Lord, Flavius Paulus, anointed king of the East, sends greetings to Wamba, king of the South. If you have already traversed the harsh and uninhabitable cliffs of the mountains, if you have already broken deep into the forest by narrow passes, like the lion of mighty breast, if you have utterly defeated the goats at running, the deer at springing, and the bears and wild pigs in voracity, if you have already disgorged the venom of snakes and vipers, make this known to us, warrior, make this known to us, lord, friend of forests and crags. For if all these have collapsed before you and you are now hastening towards us in order to repeat for us at length the song of the nightingale, and on that account, splendid man, your heart rises in self-assurance, then come down to Clausurae, (Note: A stronghold located near Le Perthus.) for there you will find a mighty champion with whom you may legitimately fight.

Paulus' offer could be interpreted as him ceasing to challenge Wamba's power as king of Hispania, as it acts as a proposal to divide the kingdom, rather than overthrowing Wamba. The provinces of Septimania and Tarraconensis had been ruled by a separate king before: from 569 to 572, the kings Liuva I (r. 568–572) and Liuvigild (r. 569–586) divided power, with Liuva ruling Septimania and Tarraconensis. It is also possible that attempting to be accepted as king in the east was simply the first step towards becoming king of the entire kingdom, and that Paulus thus still intended to depose Wamba and take control of all of Hispania. Wamba did not accept Paulus' challenge to single combat. Wamba's forces fought and defeated an army led by Ranosindo near Céret, capturing both Ranosindo and Hildigisio, before advancing on Narbonne, where Paulus waited with a second army. When Paulus heard of the size of Wamba's approaching army, he fled Narbonne, retreating to Nîmes and leaving Wittimir, a career soldier, in charge of Narbonne's defense. Wittimir managed to hold out against the royal forces for three hours until the walls were breached and then fought on ferociously despite the overwhelming numerical supriority of Wamba's army. After another three hours of fighting in the city, Wittimer withdrew to a church to rest, where he was captured by Wamba's men. Thereafter, Wamba began marching to Nîmes.

At Nîmes, Paulus led a defense consisting of Visigoths, Gallo-Romans, and even a contingent of Franks. After two days of failing to break through the city's defenses, Wamba on the third day of the siege elected to personally lead an assault on Nîmes, bringing the majority of his army to the field. In surviving historical records of the siege, it is noteworthy that Paulus referred to Wamba and his army solely as 'Goths' and talks of them disparagingly, as if that label did not also apply to large components of his own forces. Though a majority of his leading supporters had Gothic names, this suggests that perhaps his forces consisted of a larger number of Hispano-Romans and Gallo-Romans than otherwise thought. It is possible that the very reason behind the revolt partly owed to Hispano-Roman wishes to be free from Visigothic rule. Among the provinces of the Visigothic kingdom, Septimania and Tarraconensis were the two that remained the most Romanised. Wamba's final assault was successful, and as the Visigoths broke through the defenses of the rebels, Paulus and his men took refuge in a local amphitheatre, where they were again besieged by Wamba's forces. Before Wamba even needed to launch an assault, the forces of Paulus began to distrust each other to betray the cause, and his Frankish, Gothic and Roman soldiers turned on each other, beginning to fight among themselves. Seeing that his uprising was over, Paulus, Archbishop Argebad, and some of the other leaders, surrendered to Wamba on 3 September 673. Wamba's forces entered the amphitheatre and chained those of Paulus' supporters who surrendered and killed those who did not.

=== Later life ===
On 6 September 673, Paulus and his most prominent followers were judged by Wamba. Paulus was charged with the crimes of inciting the people to rebellion and of violating his oath of fealty to the king. The punishment of these crimes was normally excommunication and death, but Wamba spared the lives of Paulus and his men after they acknowledged that they were guilty. Paulus and his followers were also spared other traditional punishments, such as blinding. Some later accounts claim that Wamba had one of Paulus' hands cut off, or that he was scalped, but this is dubious considering these punishments not being mentioned in any contemporary accounts. Wamba replaced all the officials who had rebelled with new people and consolidated his control of Septimania by garrisoning troops in the larger cities. In order to deal with the Jews, who had shown considerably support for the uprising, Wamba expelled the Jews from Narbonne and went so far as to propose to end Judaism in his kingdom by mandating Jewish children to be baptised and taught Christianity.

Although Paulus was thus spared from the worst punishments, he did not go completely unpunished. Paulus and his most prominent supporters were subjected to ritual humiliation, being forced to participate in Wamba's triumph in Toledo, wherein they were paraded through the streets. The heads of the rebels were shaved and their beards were cut off, they were dressed in dirty robes and were forced to be barefoot, mounted on chariots drawn by camels. As Paulus had been the leader of the revolt, and had been proclaimed king, his head was adorned with a mock crown, either made of black leather or the bones of herrings, depending on the account. After this, Paulus and his followers were imprisoned. In 683, ten years after Paulus' defeat, Wamba's successor as king, Erwig (r. 680–687) pardoned all those who had been convicted of the revolt against Wamba. It is possible that Paulus benefitted from this and was freed, (Note: He could be the same person as a Paulus mentioned as a signatory of the Sixteenth Council of Toledo (693).) but considering that he must have been old, seemingly having been a prominent noble already in the 650s, it is more likely that he died during his imprisonment.
