= Wamba (king) =

King of the Visigoths from 672 to 680

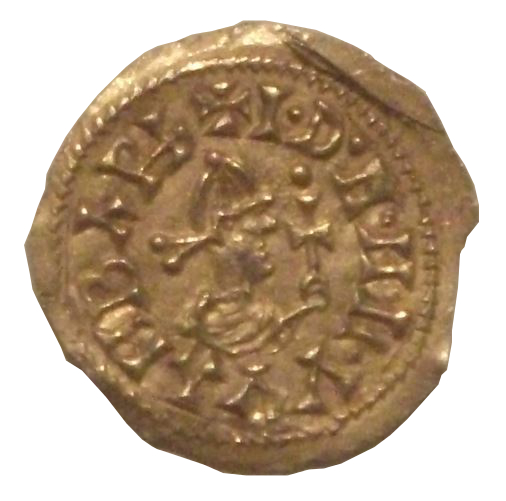
- Coin of Wamba bearing his effigy

King of the Visigoths
- Reign: 1 September 672 – 14 October 680
- Predecessor: Recceswinth
- Successor: Erwig
- Born: c. 630; Visigothic Kingdom
- Died: 687/688; Visigothic Kingdom

Wamba (Medieval Latin: Vamba, Wamba; c. 630 – 687/688) was the king of the Visigoths from 672 to 680. During his reign, the Visigothic kingdom encompassed all of Hispania and part of southern Gaul known as Septimania.

According to Herwig Wolfram, Wamba means "big paunch" in Gothic (like German: "Wampe", cognate to English "womb") and may have been a nickname. Both Julian of Toledo in his Historia Wambae (History of Wamba) and the decisions of the eleventh Council of Toledo, held under Wamba's auspices, refer to the king only as Wamba.

== History ==
=== Military events ===
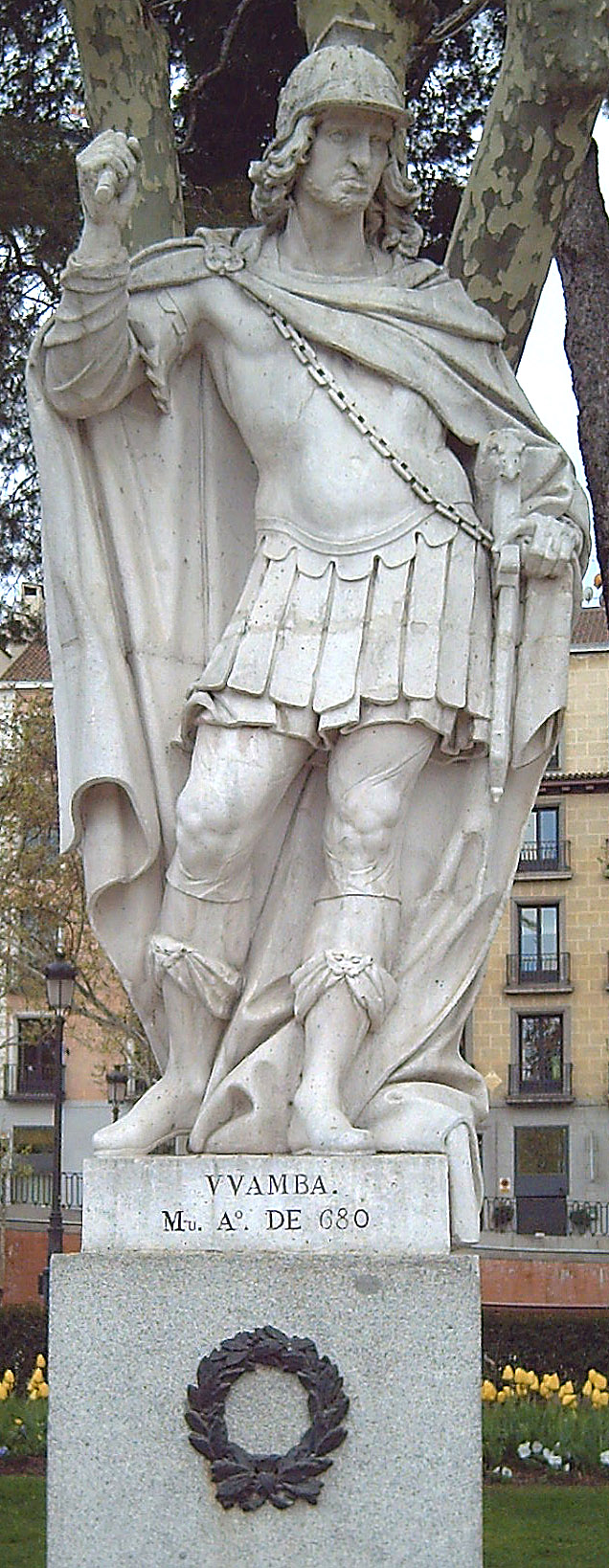
Statue in Madrid (A. Carnicero, 1750–53).

After ascending the throne on 1 September 672, Wamba faced a revolt from Hilderic, governor of Nîmes, who had himself aspired to the kingship. Hilderic was supported by Gunhild, Bishop of Maguelonne. Wamba sent the dux (general) Paul to put down the rebels, but upon his arrival at Narbonne, he induced his officers to renounce their loyalty to Wamba and elect him king as Flavius Paulus. He was joined by Hilderic and his followers, as well as Duke Ranosind of Tarraconensis and the gardingatus (a palace official) Hildigis. Paul recruited "multitudes" of Franks and Basques to bolster his forces. Following this the Visigothic cities in Gaul and a large part of northeastern Hispania came over to Paul's side.

During these events, Wamba was in Cantabria campaigning against the Basques. In response, Wamba marched into the Tarraconensis region, and in a few days turned most of the cities back to his side. He then divided his forces into three groups, attacking over the Pyrenees by way of Llívia (then the capital of Cerdanya), Auch, and the coastal road, taking the fortresses of Collioure, Vulturaria, and Llívia, finding "much" gold and silver there.

As Wamba moved on Narbonne, Paul placed General Wittimer in charge of the city and retired to Nîmes. Wamba's forces quickly subdued Narbonne and then, after some difficulty, secured the surrender of Nîmes on September 3, 673. Paul and the other rebel leaders surrendered and, three days later, were brought to trial, scalped, and imprisoned for life.

A period of peace followed and, in 674, Wamba rebuilt the Roman walls around Toledo. He also fortified other sites about this time, possibly Hondarribia (Fuenterrabia), a small village in Spain facing the French border over the Txingurri bay, as a military thrust along the Bay of Biscay up to the Pyrenees is attested to in contemporary sources. Wamba brought the Astures and Ruccones (Luggones) under his control and incorporated them into a new province. They had been fighting for their independence since the Visigothic invasions of the 5th century but now finally relented.

After the rebellion, the kingdom faced a new threat in the form of Saracen raiders. In the Chronicle of Alfonso III (written 200 years later) it stated, "In Wamba's time, 270 Saracen ships attacked the coast of Hispania and there all of them were burned." A single attack of this size is doubtful, however, because no other source mentions it. The Chronicle of 754 declared Moors "had long been raiding" Andalusia, "and simultaneously devastating many cities"; however, the Chronicle of 754's most recent English translator, Kenneth Baxter Wolf, holds that this refers to the year before the defeat of King Roderic by the Moors, over three decades after the removal of Wamba.

The law books and decrees of the time reveal a substantial erosion of domestic tranquility and order within the kingdom. In the Visigothic law books, Wamba decrees that all the people, regardless of their religion, and even if they are clergy, are required to defend the kingdom if it is attacked by a foreign foe. This law was created to solve a problem of desertion: "For, whenever an enemy invades the provinces of our kingdom … [many of] those who inhabit the border … disappear so that, by this means, there is no mutual support in battle." This rationale may imply a frequency of raids. That the people were often unwilling to defend the kingdom is further shown by another of Wamba's edicts, in which slaves were freed in order to the fill the ranks of the army. This suggests not only a shortage of volunteers from among the Hispano-Romans who made up the bulk of the population ruled by the Visigothic lords, but also an army heavy in conscripts and the coerced.

=== Religious events ===
In 675, the Third Council of Braga was held in Braga (Bracara), Gallaecia. This Catholic conclave promulgated eight decrees affecting ritual, the handling of sacred vessels, who may or may not live with a priest, unacceptable forms of punishment of clergy, and unacceptable forms of payment of clergy and rectors. In the same year, the Eleventh Council of Toledo was convened in November.

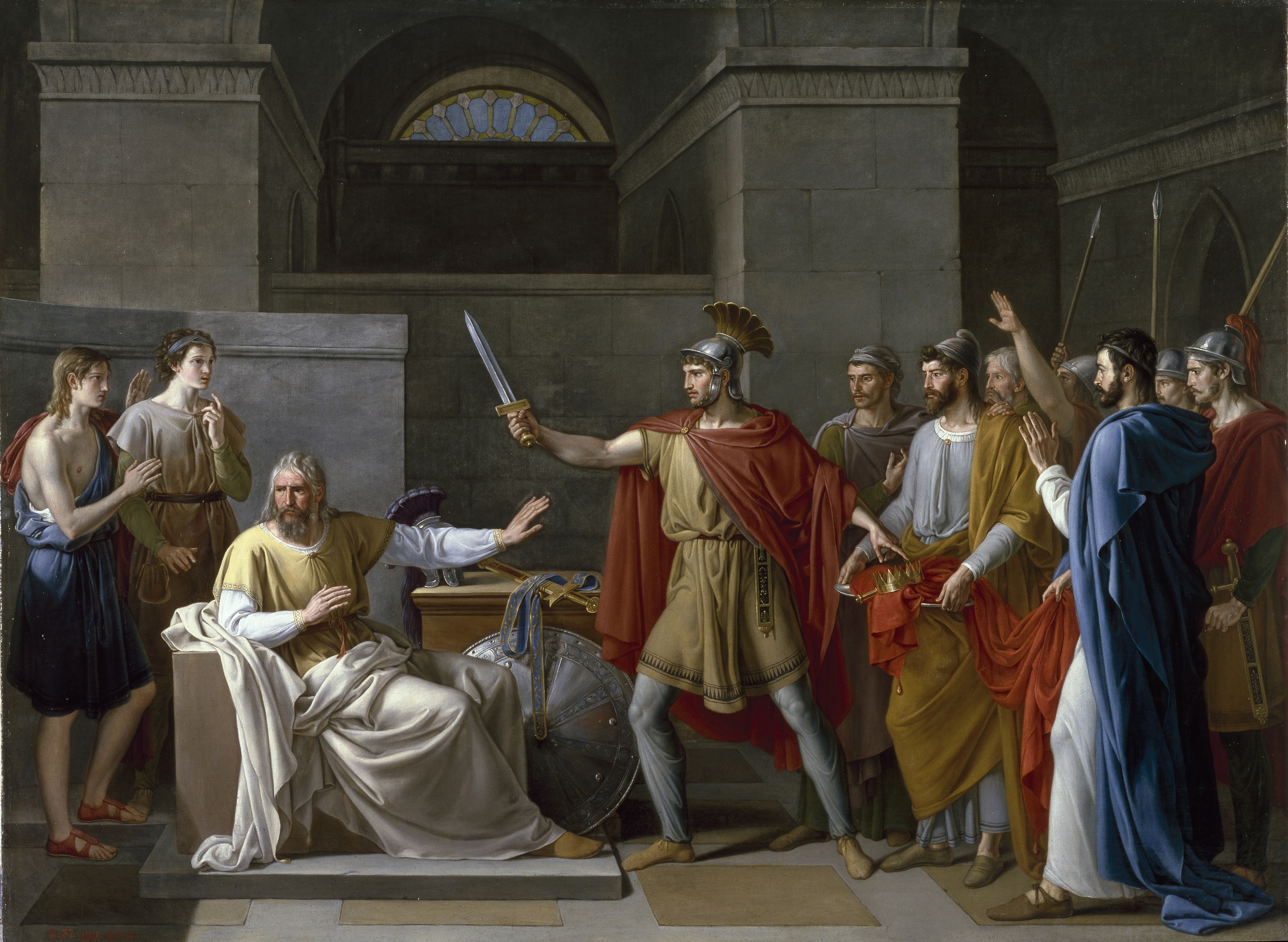
Wamba renouncing the Crown. Oil on canvas by Juan Antonio de Ribera (1819)

Wamba was a reformist king who, according to Charles Julian Bishko, "tried to set up at Aquis (Chaves) in Gallaecia a monastic see of the same type as Dume–Braga, i. e., involving the sort of episcopus sub regula associated with early pactualism. This manoeuvre was successfully blocked by the metropolitan church of Emérita with the full support of the fathers of the XIIth Council of Toledo (681)."

=== Succession ===
In 680, Wamba fell ill or (according to the Chronicle of Alfonso III two hundred years later) was poisoned in Pampliega, near Burgos. He received the order of penance in anticipation of his death, and as a result was forced to step down as king upon his recovery. The Chronicle of Alfonso III blames Wamba's successor Erwig for this; some modern commentators have blamed Julian of Toledo, who was made primate of the Visigothic church by Erwig (in reward for his services?). But Julian perpetuated the memory of Wamba in his account of the revolt of Paul, Historia Wambae Regís.

=== Birthplace ===
According to one tradition, Wamba was born in Egitânia, a settlement surrounded by Roman walls that is today called Idanha-a-Velha in the Idanha-a-Nova municipality, and located to the northeast of Castelo Branco in Portugal. A Spanish tradition has him born in Galicia in the parish of Santa María de Dozón in an old house with a shield. Manuel de Sousa da Silva, a seventeenth-century Portuguese genealogist, in his work Nobiliário das Gerações de Entre-Douro-e-Minho, refers to this possibility, adding that he was of the lineage of the Gothic kings, but so poor that he was a farmer. Modern genealogists make him a son of Tulga, a possibility sustained by the fact of his being a humble man of royal descent, since his father was deposed at a young age, and when his own sons were still infants.

However, the most famous tradition says he held land and possessions in Pujerra (or Buxarra as it was once called) in Málaga Province, an Andalusian mountain village, nestled amid forests of chestnut trees near the Genil river in southern Spain. The ruins of Molino de Capilla (Mill of the Chapel) are nearby, and close to which lay the village of Cenay, which some consider to be Wamba's actual birthplace.

=== Kingship ===
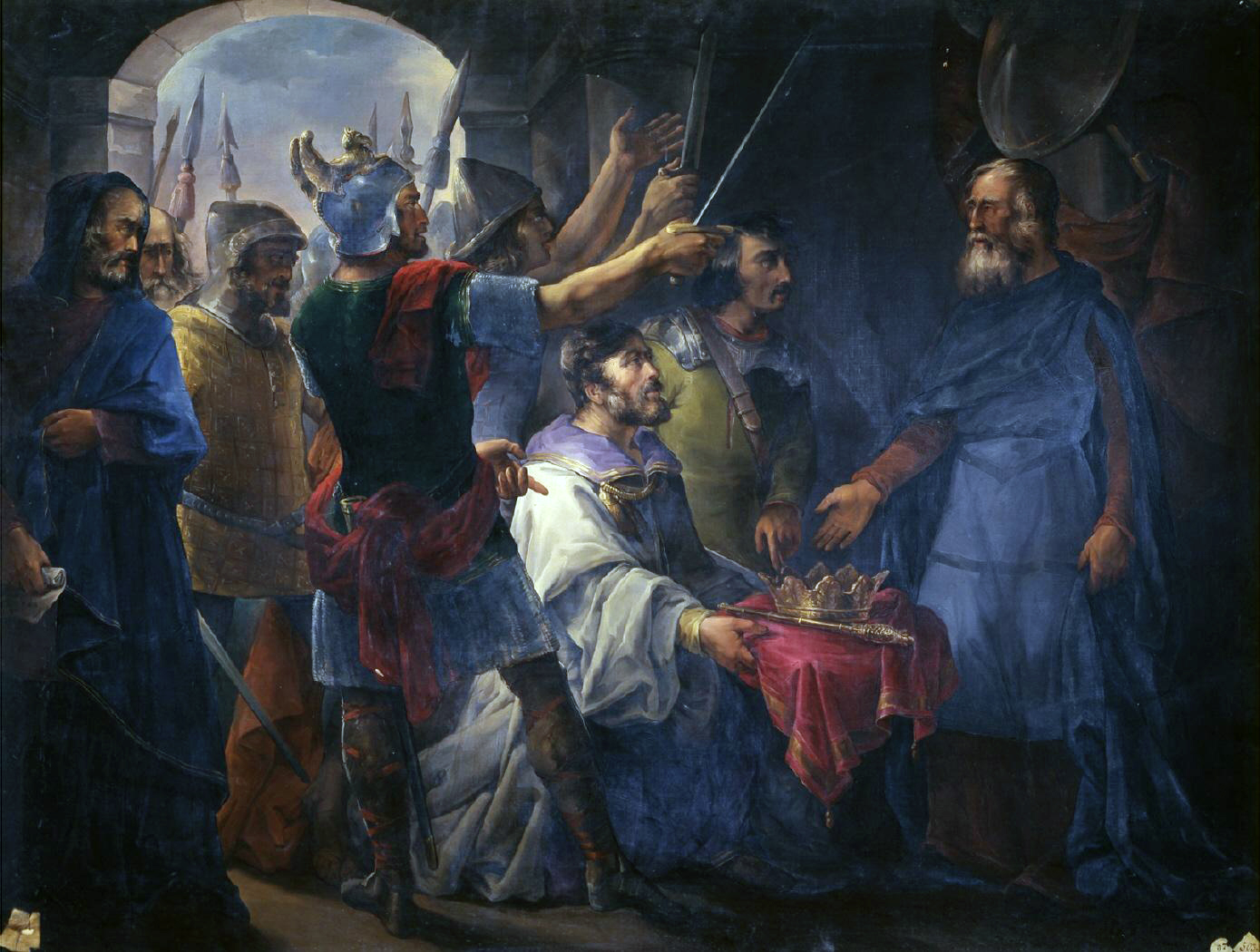
The Election of Wamba as King. Oil on canvas by Francisco de Paula Van Halen (1843)

There are at least two legends associated with how Wamba became king.

One legend begins with Wamba's father, king of the Visigoths, who in this story was also named Wamba. Two women of his court, a servant girl and a noble lady, became pregnant at the same time. To avoid a scandal that might implicate the king, both women fled the capital. They found their way to an Andalusian village that, because it was so well hidden in the forest, provided an ideal place for secret births. Both women brought forth boys, and they were placed in the care of a servant girl to be raised in the area.

When the time came to groom a successor for the king, there seemed to be no suitable heir. Soldiers were dispatched to the village to find the illegitimate children. After their arrival, they overheard a peasant woman call to her son named Wamba, who was tending cattle with a stick. The soldiers knew they had come upon the youth they sought and declared: "You are the rightful king and we must ask you to come with us to the palace." Wamba was unwilling, or at least pretended to be. He took his stick and thrust it into the ground, saying, "I will only accept the throne if this stick takes root." The stick he carried was of chopo or black poplar, which easily takes root in fertile soil. When it began to grow, Wamba agreed to go with the soldiers to become the new king of the Visigoths, being elected and crowned in what is today the tiny village of Wamba in the region around Madrid.

A second legend is related by Charles Morris in Historical Tales: Spanish ("The Good King Wamba"). In this version, instead of being a boy, Wamba was an old man in the village, and owned land and possessions there. According to Morris:

In those days, when a king died and left no son, the Goths elected a new one, seeking their best and worthiest, and holding the election in the place where the old king had died. It was in the little village of Gerticos, some eight miles from the city of Valladolid, that King Recesuinto had sought health and found death. Hither came the electors—the great nobles, the bishops, and the generals—and here they debated who should be king, finally settling on a venerable Goth named Wamba, the one man of note in all the kingdom who throughout his life had declined to accept rank and station.

Saint Leo, declaring he had been given divine guidance, instructed the electors to seek out a husbandman named Wamba. So scouts were dispersed until Wamba was found tilling one of his fields. "Leave your plough in the furrow", they said to him; "nobler work awaits you. You have been elected king of Hispania." "There is no nobler work", answered Wamba. "Seek elsewhere your monarch. I prefer to rule over my fields."

The heralds did not know what to make of this. To them, the man who would not be king must be a saint—or an idiot. They reasoned, begged and implored until Wamba, who wanted to get rid of them, said: "I will accept the crown when the dry rod in my hand grows green again—and not till then."

After he thrust it into the ground, all were astonished to see it suddenly become a green plant with leaves growing out of the top. Everyone believed heaven had decided the matter. So Wamba "went with the heralds to the electoral congress". Once there, however, he again tried to refuse the throne. At this, one of the Visigothic chieftains drew his sword and threatened to behead Wamba if he did not accept the crown. Wamba relented and consented.

The legend of the stick thrust into the ground is also associated with the town of Guimarães, southwest of Braga in the Costa Verde of Portugal (the northwest corner of the country). There, because Wamba never withdrew the stick afterwards, it is said it grew into an olive tree. Though the tree is now gone, the site is marked either by the monastery of Nossa Senhora da Oliveira (Our Lady of the Olive) or the Largo da Oliveira town square, each named for the legendary tree.

=== Saint Giles ===
In a 10th-century Life of Saint Giles, written for the benefit of pilgrims, a legend is recorded about how, one day, when King Wamba (also known as Flavius) was out hunting in the forest between Arles and Nîmes in Provence, he began to pursue a hind (deer). The animal fled, seeking refuge in the cave where Giles the hermit was quietly praying. (In some versions of the story, the hind, provided by God, was Giles' sole companion and sustained him on its milk.) Wamba shot his arrow into the opening. But he missed the hind, striking Giles instead, wounding him in the leg and causing a permanent disability. The king's hunting dogs then rushed in for the kill. But when Wamba arrived he found his dogs miraculously rooted to the spot. Discovering what he had done, he begged forgiveness and tried to make amends. But Giles continued his prayers, refusing all help or recompense. The king nonetheless had doctors care for the wound. He also offered Giles the land upon which to build a monastery. But Giles refused.

Over time, however, because of the saint's fame as a sage and miracle worker, multitudes gathered at his cave. Around 674, Wamba built them a monastery. Giles became its first abbot. Soon a little town grew up there, known as Saint-Gilles-du-Gard.

Because of this tradition, Giles became the patron saint of cripples, lepers, and nursing mothers. His emblem is an arrow. The Catholic Encyclopedia noted that the king in this story must have originally been a Frank, "since the Franks had expelled the Visigoths from the neighbourhood of Nîmes almost a century and a half earlier".

=== Loss of the crown ===
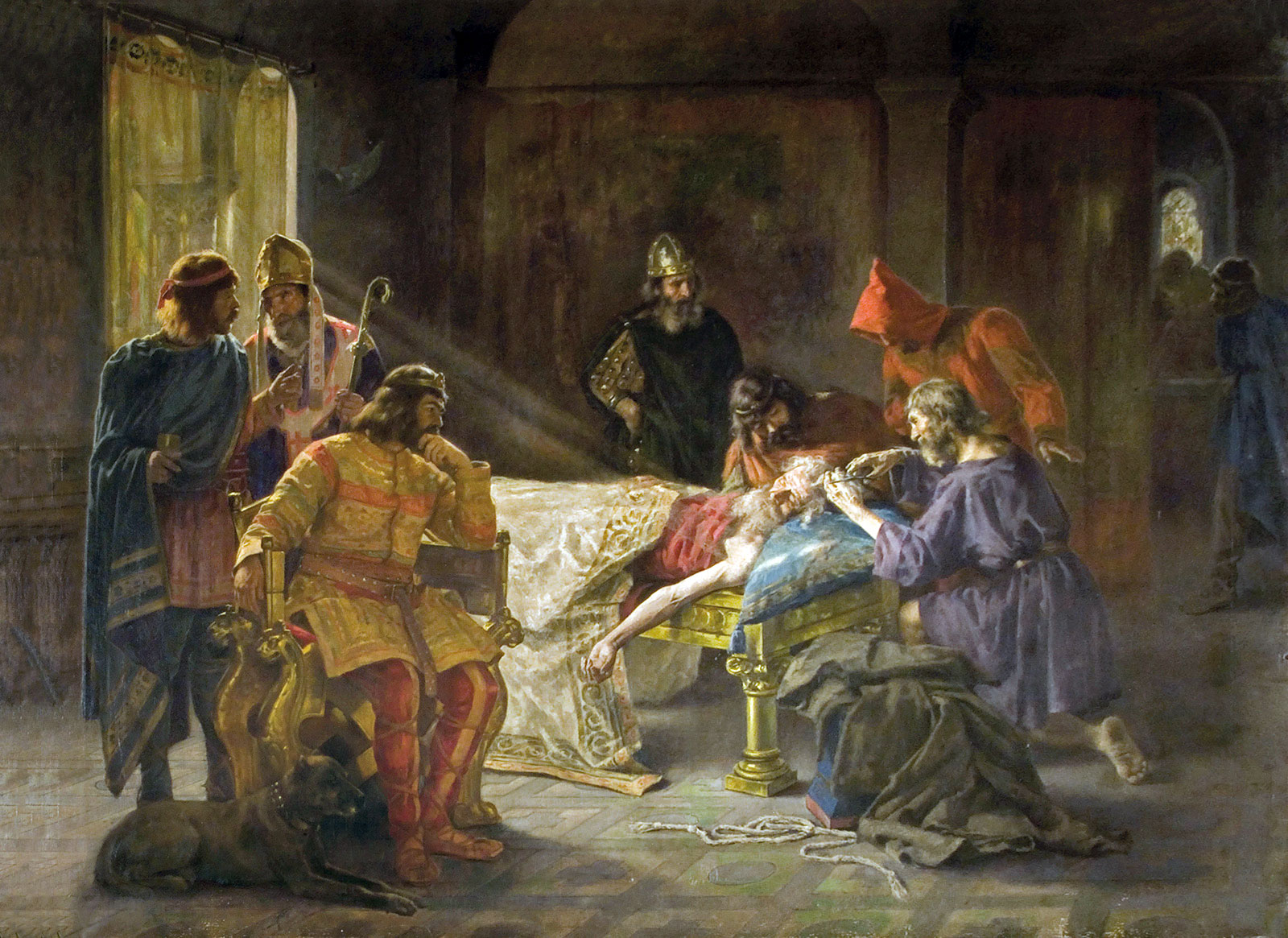
The tonsuring of king Wamba by Joan Brull. Oil on canvas (1894)

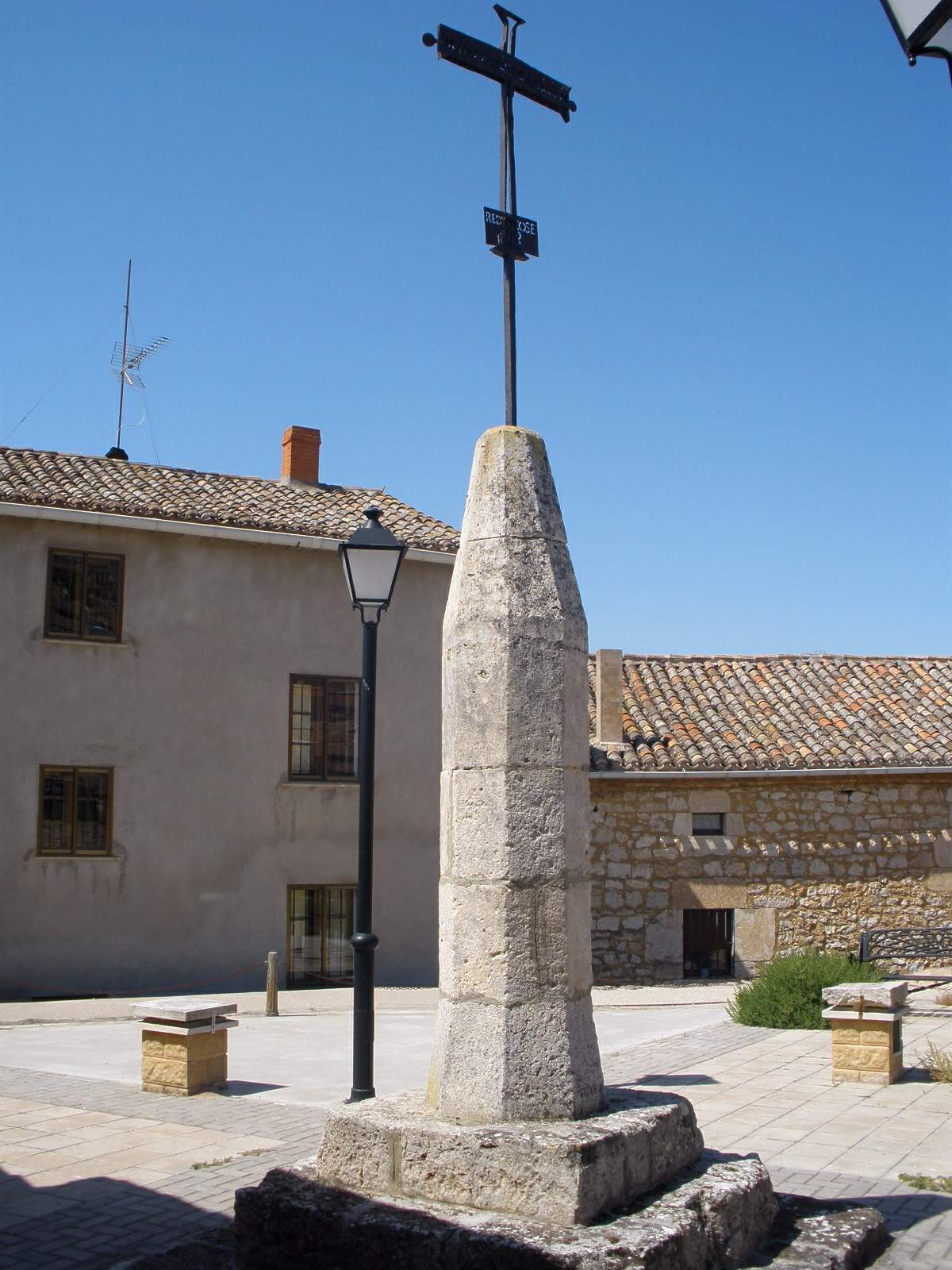
Commemorative cross king Wamba, in the place where the Monastery of Black Monks of San Vicente de Pampliega existed, in which he died and was buried in the year 688.

Charles Morris writes that, during Wamba's reign:

One ambitious noble named Paul, who thought it would be an easy thing to take the throne from an old man who had shown so plainly that he did not want it, rose in rebellion. He soon learned his mistake. Wamba met him in battle, routed his army, and took him prisoner. Paul expected nothing less than to have his head stricken off, but Wamba simply ordered that it should be shaved.

A shaved or tonsured head meant that Paul had assumed monastic orders, so he could not serve as king or chieftain.

Later an ambitious youth named Erwig, pursuing the overthrow of the king, administered a sleeping potion. While Wamba was under, Erwig shaved the crown of his head. Erwig said he did it at Wamba's request. As before, Gothic law was clear. Wamba could no longer be king. Erwig became king in his place.

Wamba accepted this change and happily assumed monastic orders, abdicating the throne to live out the last seven years of his life as a monk.

According to Morris, Wamba acquitted himself well in all his stations—farmer, king, and monk—and his name has come down to us from the mists of time as one of those rare men of whom we know little, but all that we know is good.

Ironically, it was Wamba's nephew, son of his sister Ariberga, Egica, who married Erwig's daughter and became the new king at his father in law's death.

== Bibliography ==
- Charles Julian Bishko, "Portuguese Pactual Monasticism in the Eleventh Century: The Case of São Salvador De Vacariça", Estudos de História de Portugal: Homenagen a A.H. de Oliveira Margues (Lisbon: Editorial Estampa, 1982).
- Henry Bradley, The Goths: from the Earliest Times to the End of the Gothic Dominion in Spain, chapter 33. 2nd ed., 1883, New York: G.P. Putnam's Sons.
- Julian of Toledo, Historia Wambae regís, in Mon. Ger. Hist., Scriptores rerum Merovingicarum, V, 486–535; and cf. Dahn, Könige der Germanen, V, 207–212, 217–218; R. Altamira, Cambridge Medieval History, II, 179.
- Charles Morris, Historical Tales, the Romance of Reality: Spanish. 1898, Philadelphia: J.B. Lippincott Company.
- Manuel de Sousa da Silva, Nobiliário das Gerações de Entre-Douro-e-Minho

== See also ==
- Wamba, Valladolid
- Castle of Ródão
- Idanha-a-Velha
- City walls of Toledo

== Notes ==
Regnal titles
Preceded by Recceswinth	King of the Visigoths; 1 September 672 – 14 October 680	Succeeded by Erwig
