= Bertrand de Montredon =

French Catholic bishop

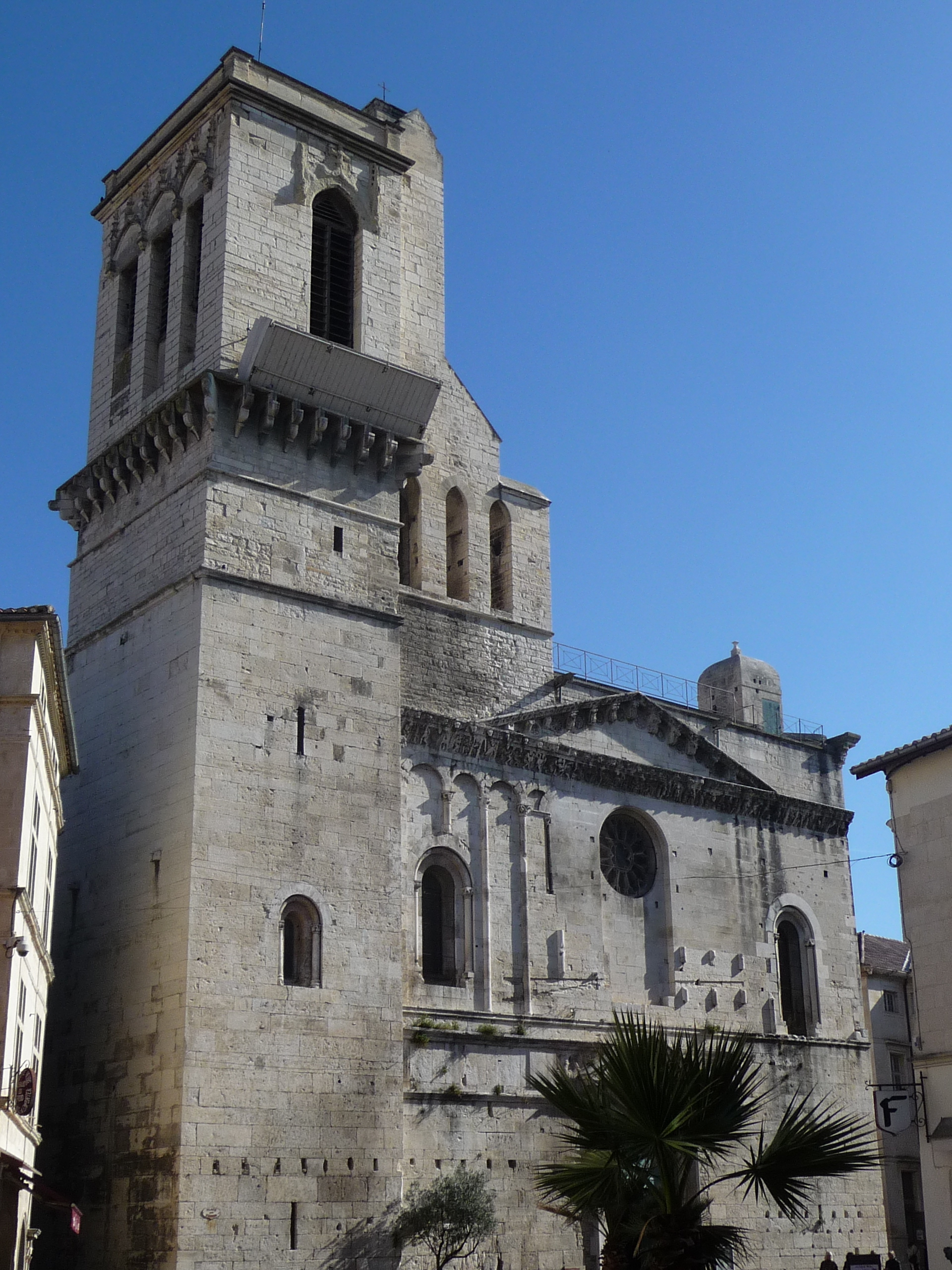
File:Cathédrale Notre-Dame de Nîmes.

Bertrand de Montredon was an 11th-century Catholic bishop.

== Bishop of Nimes ==
He was consecrated by Pope Urban II, and was bishop of Nîmes from 1095 to 1097 and then of Narbonne from 1097–1106. As Bishop of Nimes he attended the Council of Clermont in 1095, and the synod convened for the blessing of Maguelonne island and the founding of a church there, He was also at the wedding of count Raymond of Saint-Giles.

== Archbishop of Narbonne ==
After serving as Archbishop of Narbonne, he was replaced in the dispute between Psalmodi and St. Victor of Marseille by the mediator Raymond William of Montpellier, possibly as late as 1106, when he is recorded by Pascal II.

It is not known the reason why Bertrand was deposed. He was replaced by cardinal Richard, Abbot of St Victor of Marseille on Nov 5, 1106. He had served the diocese for 10 years and it is said that he died of mort de chagrin(died of sorrow.)
