= Arnaud de Lévezou =

French bishop (died 1149)

Arnaud de Lévézou (died 30 September 1149), son of Aicfred of Lévézou (Rouergue) and of Arsinde de Millau, was the scion of a powerful family who had fortified Lévézou in the preceding century.

Arnaud was prior of the abbey of Cassan, bishop of Béziers (1095/6) and Archbishop of Narbonne (16 April 1121) and a papal legate. His cousin Richard de Millau (died 15 February 1121) preceded him as Archbishop of Narbonne. During the minority of the viscountess Ermengarde of Narbonne from 1134, Arnaud encouraged the regency of Alphonse I of Toulouse, who invaded Narbonne in 1139 with the support of the Archbishop, whom he made governor of Narbonne.
