= Francisco de Paula Van Halen =

Spanish painter (1814–1887)

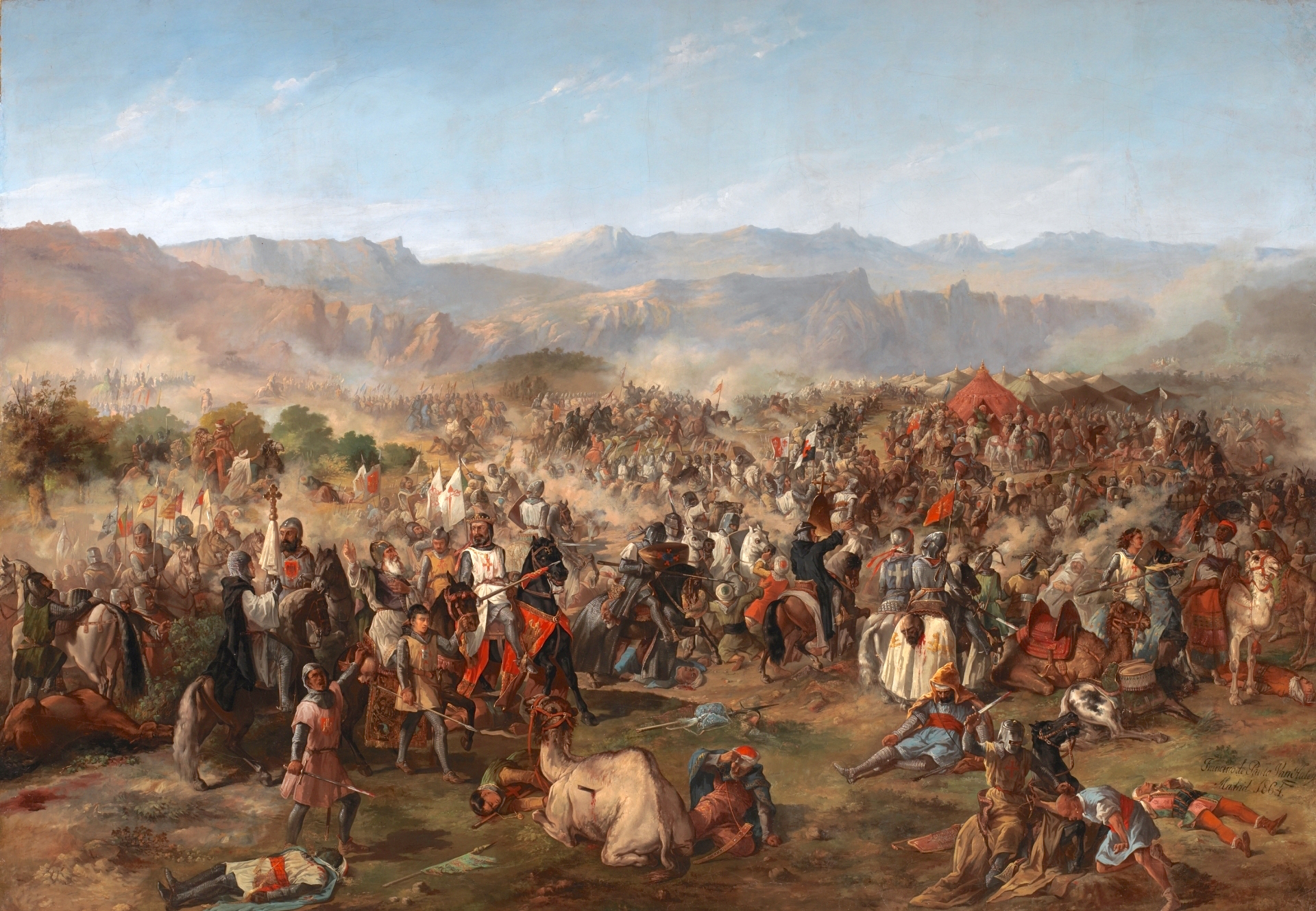
The Battle of Las Navas de Tolosa

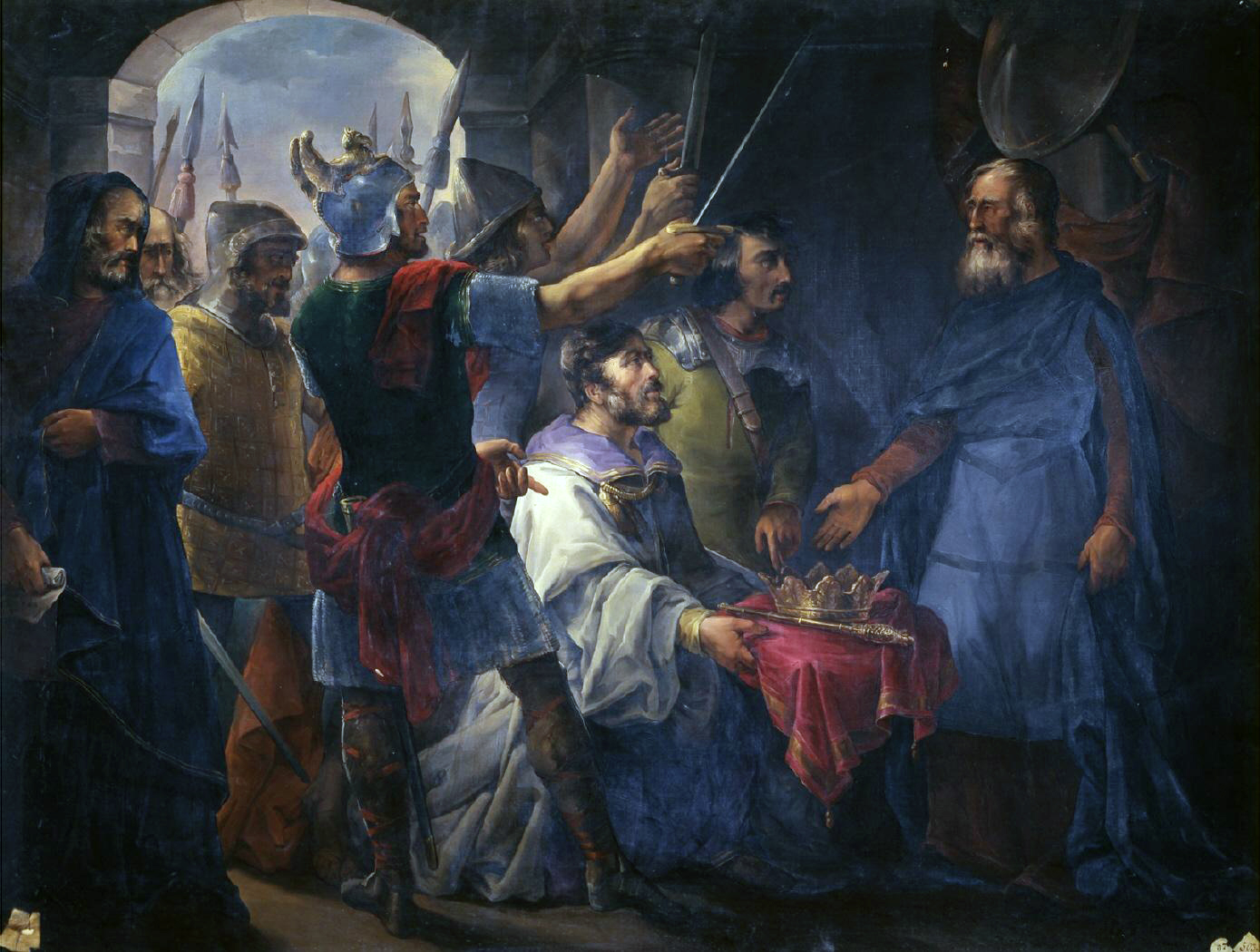
The election of Wamba as king of the Visigoths

Francisco de Paula Van Halen y Gil (3 March 1814, Vic – 11 February 1887, Madrid) was a Spanish painter, known primarily for battle scenes and other historical works.

== Biography ==
Long thought to be a nephew of the General and military adventurer, Juan Van Halen, recent research by Juan Van Halen Acedo indicates that he was probably the General's son.

He began his career in Barcelona, then moved to Madrid, where he enrolled at the Real Academia de Bellas Artes de San Fernando and studied with José Aparicio. In 1838, he made his public début at the age of 24 with his rendering of the death of Don Álvaro de Luna; displayed at an exposition of the "Liceo Artistico y Literario".

After that, he found work as an illustrator and engraver for some of Madrid's major magazines. He also edited several collections of lithographs, including La España Pintoresca y Artística, El Museo Histórico Español and Museo Militar. One of his most popular collections, which was reissued in the 1950s, was Función de Toros.

In 1851, he was named a court painter for Queen Isabel II and was elected a member of the San Fernando Academy. His work for the Queen included the creation of scientific drawings for the Museo Nacional de Ciencias Naturales and one of his two best-known battle paintings, the "Batalla de los Siete Condes" was commissioned by her. The other painting, Battle of Las Navas de Tolosa, is on display in the Senate Palace. Many of his other paintings are on display in the Royal Palace. From 1860, he was a frequent participant in the National Exhibition of Fine Arts.

His wife, Margarita, was the sister of poet and progressive politician, Fernando Corradi. He was a Commander in the Order of Isabella the Catholic. A street in Vic is named after him.
