= Castle of Ródão =

Castle in Castelo Branco, Portugal

- Castelo de Ródão
- Castelo Branco, Beira Baixa, Central Region, Portugal in Portugal
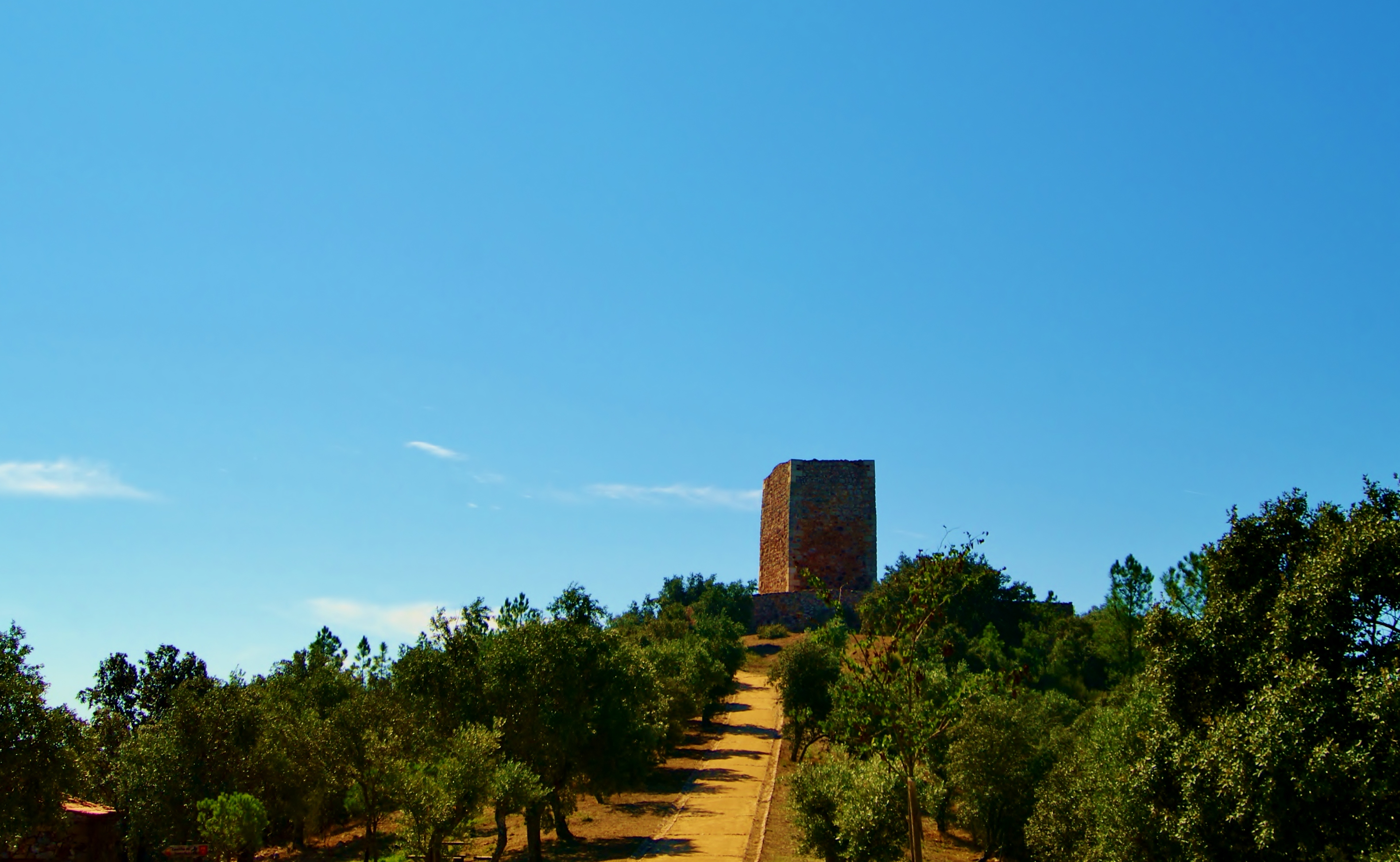
- A distant perspective of the castle of King Wamba in the territory of Ródão

Site information
- Type: Castle
- Owner: Portuguese Republic
- Open to the public: Public

Location
- Coordinates: 39°38′50.7″N 7°41′23.7″W

Site history
- Built: 11th century
- Materials: Granite, Mortar, Schist

The Castle of Ródão (Portuguese: Castelo de Ródão) is a medieval castle located in the civil parish of Vila Velha de Ródão, in the municipality of Vila Velha de Ródão, Portuguese Castelo Branco.

== History ==
Legend suggests that Visigoth Wamba (672-680) erected a castle on this site sometime during the 7th century, but archaeological excavations don't confirm this perspective.

The construction of the current structure and watchtower was erected between 11th and 12th century, likely over the pre-existing castro by the initiative of the Knights Templar: the tower erected could have been either a watchtower or keep tower. In 1199, the Herdade da Açafa was donated by King D. Sancho to the Templars.

By 1505, circling walls had already been greatly destroyed.

By the middle of the 18th century, the castle was used as an artillery spot for the protection of the Tagus passage. The battlements and artillery posts were constructed on the flank overlooking the Tagus, in the area referred to as Batarias.

At the beginning of the 19th century, the castle was reconstructed, during the preparation for the first French invasion of the peninsula, during the Napoleonic Wars, through the initiative of the Marques de Alorna.

In August 1999, the municipal council of Castel Branco, IPPAR and IPA determined to recuperat the Castle of King Vamba and its surrounding area, including walls.

Between 2000 and 2001, the municipal council and the Associação de Altos Estudos do Tejo (Tagus Higher Studies Association) undertook archeological surveys in the castle, under the direction of Dr. Fernando Branco (from the University of Évora).

By June 2004, there was a new project by the municipal council of Vila Velha de Ródão, that included the consolidation and rehabilitation of the tower and walls, by the DREMC. In the preceding years (from 2004 to 2006) the Direcção Geral dos Edifícios e Monumentos Nacionais ( General-Directorate for Buildings and National Monuments) began work to recuperate the tower and walls that included the construction of an interior staircase and floor in the tower, to act as viewpoint, and arrangements to the exterior. Dr. Pilar Reis accompanied and excavated the area around the tower and interior courtyard in 2006.

== Architecture ==
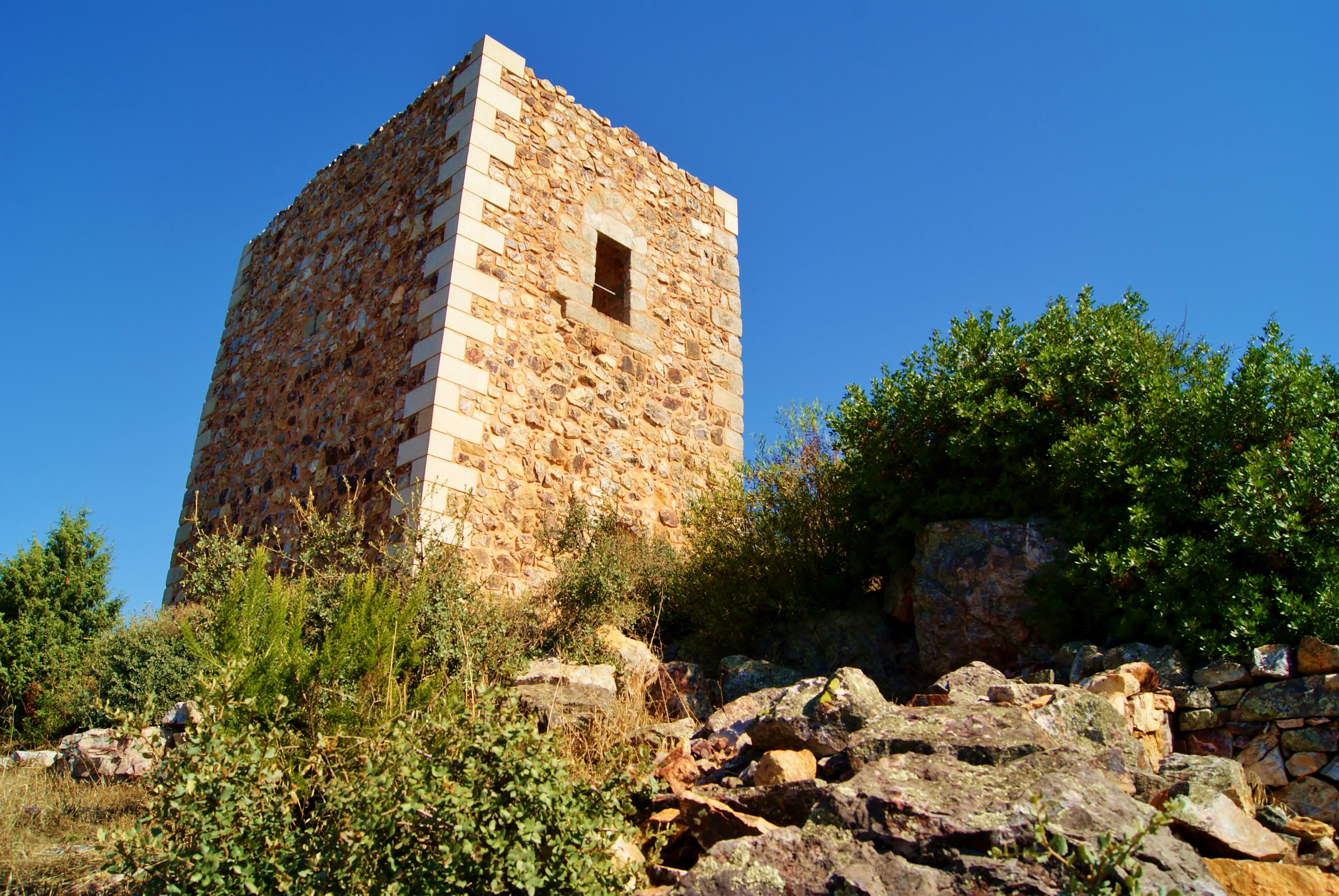
A view of the castle keep/watchtower from the flanks of the hilltop

The Castle of Ródão is situated on the extreme southern part of the Serra das Talhas (or Serra de São Miguel) on the flanks of a mountaintop comprising schist and covered in arboreal and scrub brush forest. The site overlooks the Tagus River valley, dominated by a geological feature called the Portas do Rodão, located 315 metres (1,033 ft) above sea level.

The walled fortification follows an irregular, oval plan, consisting of two, partial battlements of masonry, vestiges of a built construction consisting of small granite blocks in an area dominated by a large granite stone surface. In the area outside the walls there was a discovery of various ceramic fragments. The lookout tower is implanted in the northeast, a rectangular plan, without ceiling. The southern elevation's first floor includes a large rhombus of great dimensions. The second floor includes a rounded doorway with rectangular lintel and tympanum with a sculpted cross of the Order of the Temple. On one of the undulations is the mark of the sculpture, in the form of a horizontal "S". The northern, southern and western elevations are similar with embrasures and incomplete decoration, partially destroyed.
