= Hilderic of Nîmes =

7th-century Hispanian nobleman and rebel leader

Hilderic or Hilderuc was Visigothic count of Nîmes during the reigns of Recceswinth and Wamba. Immediately upon the latter's accession in 672, Hilderic rebelled. Many oppressed Jews joined this rebellion. When Wamba sent the Duke Paul to end the hostilities, the latter became a rebel himself in Septimania (Narbonensis and Tarraconensis). Hilderic's fate is unknown, though Wamba crushed the rebels, he let Paul live.
