= Ancient Diocese of Narbonne =

Roman Catholic diocese in France (3rd century - 1801)

Coordinates: 43°11′2″N 3°0′14″E

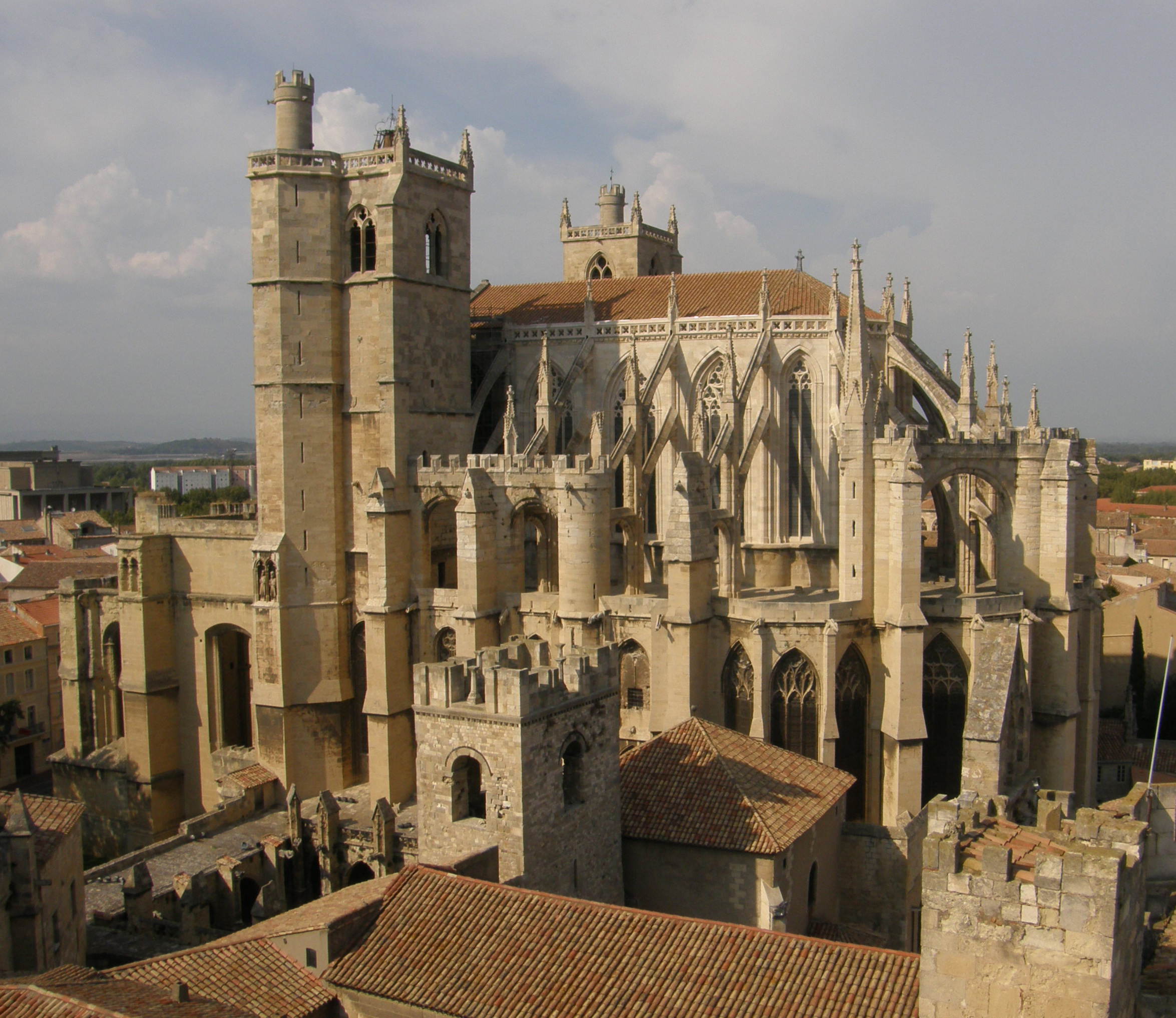
Cathedral of St-Just, Narbonne

The former Catholic diocese of Narbonne existed from early Christian times until the French Revolution. It was an archdiocese, with its see at Narbonne, from the year 445, and its influence ran over much of south-western France and into Catalonia.

At the beginning of the 18th century, the ecclesiastical province of Narbonne included the dioceses of: Agde, Alais, Béziers, Carcassonne, Alet, Lodève, Montpellier, Nimes, Elne, Saint-Pons, and Uzès.

== History ==
Bishop Selva (c. 633–638) subscribed as a metropolitan bishop at the Council of Toledo in 633.

In a bull of 20 August 896, which confirmed the rights, privileges, and possessions of Narbonne, Pope Stephen VI granted the church of Narbonne the right to elect a bishop without outside interference, even from the king.

In 908, at the command of Charles the Simple, King of the Western Franks, Archbishop Arnustus of Narbonne consecrated, with the assistance of bishops Nantigius of Urgel and Teudericus of Barcelona, one of the members of the king's court, Vigo (Guigui) to be bishop of Gerona. On 21 November 908, a meeting of the clergy, nobility, and people was held in the church of S. Felix in Gerona at the call of Count Wifred of Barcelona, Gerona, and Ausona (Osona), to acknowledge, elect, and install their new bishop. The consecrators were present. The proceedings demonstrate the power and influence of lay magnates over church appointments.

Archbishop Arnustus (893–912) was assassinated by his enemies while he was on his way to a council to be held in Barcelona. In preparing for the election of a successor, the clergy and people of Narbonne invited each of the suffragan bishops of the archdiocese, and, following an old custom, the archbishop of Arles and his suffragans as well. Archbishop Rostagnus of Arles set out, but when he reached Agde, he and the bishops of Uzès and Maguelonne uncanonically elected and consecrated Gérard, who was the nephew of Bishop Amelius of Uzès. The bishops of the province of Narbonne and the clergy and people of the archdiocese immediately elected the abbot Agius, and sent a letter of protest to Pope Anastasius III, asking that the election of Gérard be voided, and that archbishop-elect Agius be dispensed from having to appear at the Roman court due to the danger of travel. Gérard, however, set off for Rome. Pope Anastasius died in October 913, and it was left to his successor Pope John X to deal with the case. Gérard did not wait, however, but forged some papal documents in his favor and returned to Narbonne, hoping to expel Archbishop Agius. The bishops of the province of Narbonne wrote to the pope again with additional particulars, and Pope John voided the election of Gérard. He sent the archbishop of Besançon to Narbonne to bestow the pallium on Archbishop Agius and to drive Gérard out of the diocese.

A provincial synod was held in Narbonne by Archbishop Aymeric on 27 March 1247. The principal business was a petition presented by the clergy and people of Elne for a new bishop. In discussion at the council, the representatives of Elne came to agree on Riculf, a choice which was approved by the council. Several months later, Archbishop Aymeric held a synod in the diocese of Elne, at a place called in Fontis, in which the bishops of Gerona and Urgel were deposed. in accordance with a decree of Pope Innocent IV, though they were restored by the council as an act of mercy.

=== French Revolution ===
The National Constituent Assembly ordered the replacement of political subdivisions of the ancien régime with subdivisions called "departments", to be characterized by a single administrative city in the center of a compact area. The decree was passed on 22 December 1789, and the boundaries fixed on 26 February 1790, with the effective date of 4 March 1790. A new department was created, called "Aude", and its administrative center was fixed at Carcassonne, with Narbonne as one of its districts.

The National Constituent Assembly then, on 6 February 1790, instructed its ecclesiastical committee to prepare a plan for the reorganization of the clergy. At the end of May, its work was presented as a draft Civil Constitution of the Clergy, which, after vigorous debate, was approved on 12 July 1790. There was to be one diocese in each department, a policy later adhered to by Napoleon. Under the Civil Constitution of the Clergy, the diocese of Narbonne was combined with the dioceses of Carcassonne, Alet, Saint-Papoul and Mirepoix into the new Diocese of the Aude, with its seat at Narbonne. It included 565 parishes. It was a part of the Métropole du Sud, which included ten départements.

=== Restoration ===
The French Directory fell in the coup engineered by Talleyrand and Napoleon on 10 November 1799. The coup resulted in the establishment of the French Consulate, with Napoleon as the First Consul. To advance his aggressive military foreign policy, he decided to make peace with the Catholic Church in France and with the Papacy. In the concordat of 1801 with Pope Pius VII, and in the enabling papal bull, "Qui Christi Domini", the constitutional diocese of Aude and all the other dioceses in France, were suppressed. This removed all the institutional contaminations and novelties introduced by the Constitutional Church, and voided all of the episcopal appointments of both authentic and constitutional bishops.

In restoring the pre-revolutionary ecclesiastical structure, the template provided by the Constitutional Church was followed, in providing for only ten metropolitan archbishoprics. The ecclesiastical province of Narbonne was not restored, nor was the archdiocese of Narbonne. The dioceses of the ecclesiastical province were either transferred to other ecclesiastical provinces, or were not restored. The territory of the former diocese of Narbonne was merged under the Concordat of 1801 into the diocese of Carcassonne, and the diocese of Carcassone was assigned to the ecclesiastical province of Toulouse.

After the Restoration of the Bourbons following Napoleon's defeat at Waterloo, new national boundaries were drawn by the Congress of Vienna and the Treaty of Paris (1815). This required, on the part of the Papacy, the negotiation of new concordats with the various Powers, in the light of events of the previous quarter-century. This resulted in a treaty between Louis XVIII and Pope Pius VII, the Concordat of 11 June 1817. The archdiocese of Narbonne was to be reestablished through the bull "Commissa divinitus", The proposed concordat was submitted to the French National Assembly, but it was defeated by members who were still of liberal political persuasion and hostile to the reactionary policies of the Bourbon government.

On 6 October 1822, a revised version of the bull of 1817, "Commissa divinitus", now called "Paternae charitatis", was signed, and on demand of the king was enacted into French law in 1823. In paragraph 13 of that bull, the decision is taken not to restore the ecclesiastical province of Narbonne or the diocese. The archdiocese of Toulouse became the archdiocese of Toulouse-Narbonne.

=== Modern times ===
After more than a century, a new metropolitan see was created for the Languedoc region, with the elevation of the bishopric of Montpellier to the rank of Metropolitan Archbishop on 8 December 2002. The diocese of Carcassonne was transferred from the metropolitanate of Toulouse to that of Montpellier, and on 14 June 2006 the name of the diocese of Carcassonne was changed to the Diocese of Carcassonne and Narbonne. Toulouse no longer carries the title Toulouse-Narbonne.

== Bishops and archbishops ==
=== To 1000 ===
- [ Paul of Narbonne ]
- [ Saint Etienne (third century) ]
- [ (359) : Gavidius ]
- (417–422) : Hilarius
- (427–461) : Rusticus (427, 461, c. 441–445)
- [ (462) : Hermes ]
- Caprarius (c. 506)
- (560) : Aquilinus
- Athaloc (c. 589)
- (c. 589–597) : Migetius (Migecio)
- (c. 610) : Sergius
- Selva (c. 633–638)
- Argebaud (c. 672)
- Sunifred (c. 683–688)
- [ Aribertus (c. 768) ]
- Daniel (c. 769–c. 798)
- (c. 790–c. 825) :Nebridius (Nefridius) (c. 790–822 or c. 799–c. 825)
- (c. 827–844) : Bartholomeus
- (c. 842–c. 850) : Berarius
- (c. 855–872) : Fredoldus
- (873–885) : Sigebaud
- (885–893) : Theodard
- (893–912) : Arnustus
- [ (912) : Gerard ]
- (912–924) : Agio
- (926–977) : Aimery
- (977–1017/1019) : Ermengaud (Ermengol)

=== 1000–1300 ===
- (1019–1079) : Guifred de Cerdagne

[ (1079–1085) : Peter Berenger of Narbonne [

- (1081–1097) : Dalmatius
- (1097–1106) : Bertrand de Montredon
- (1106–1121) : Richard de Millau (Milhau)
- (1121–1149) :Arnaud de Lévezou
- (1150–1156) : Pierre d'Anduze
- (1156–1162) : Berenger of Narbonne
- (1162–1181) : Pons D'Arce
- (1182–1191) : Bernard Gaucelin
- (1191–1212) : Berengar of Barcelona
- (1212–1225) : Arnaldus Amalric, O.Cist.
- (1226–1245) : Pierre Amiel (Petrus Amelii)
- (1245–1257) : Guillaume de Broue
- (1257–1259) : Jacques
- (1259–1261) : Guy de Foulques
- (1263–1272) : Maurinus
- (1272–1286) : Pierre de Montbrun
- (1287–1311) : Gilles I Aycelin de Montaigu

=== 1300–1500 ===
- (1311–1341) : Bernard de Fargis
- (1341–1346) : Gausbert du Val (Cardinal)
- (1347–1375) : Pierre de La Jugie
- (1375–1391) : Jean Roger
- (1391–1432) : François de Conzié
- (1433–1436) : Francesco Condulmer (Cardinal) in commendam
- (1436–1451) : Jean D'Harcourt
- (1451–1460) : Louis D'Harcourt
- (1460–1472) : Antoine du Bec-Crespin
- (1473–1482) : Renaud de Bourbon
- (1482–1484) : Georges d'Amboise
- (1484–1491) : François Ilallé
- (1492–1494) : Georges d'Amboise, second time
- (1494–1502) : Pierre D'Abzac

=== after 1500 ===
- (1502–1507) : François-Guillaume de Castelnau
- (1507–1514) : Cardinal Guillaume Briçonnet
- (1515–1523) : Cardinal Giulio de Medici (later Pope Clement VII)
- (1524–1550) : Jean, Cardinal of Lorraine
- (1550–1551) : Cardinal Ippolito d'Este, Cardinal of Ferrara
- (1551–1563) : Francesco Pisani (Cardinal)
- (1563–1572) : Cardinal Ippolito d'Este
- (1572–1575) : Simon Vigor
- (1581–1588) : Cardinal François de Joyeuse
- (1588–1594) : Raymond Cavalésy, O.P.
- (1600–1628) : Louis de Vervins, O.P.
- (1628–1659) : Claude de Rebé
- (1659–1673) : François Fouquet
- (1673–1703) : Pierre de Bonzi
- (1711–1715) : Charles Legoux de La Berchère
- (1726–1738) : René-François de Beauvau du Rivau
- (1739–1751) : Jean-Louis de Berton de Crillon
- (1752–1762) : Charles-Antoine de La Roche-Aimon
- (1763–1790) : Arthur Richard de Dillon (1806)

Constitutional church (schismatic)

- (1791–4 February 1801) : Guillaume Besaucèle (Constitutional Bishop of Aude)

== See also ==
- Catholic Church in France
- List of Catholic dioceses in France

== Bibliography ==
=== Reference works ===
- Gams, Pius Bonifatius (1873). Series episcoporum Ecclesiae catholicae: quotquot innotuerunt a beato Petro apostolo. Ratisbon: Typis et Sumptibus Georgii Josephi Manz. pp. 582–584. (Use with caution; obsolete)
- Eubel, Conradus, ed. (1913). Hierarchia catholica, Tomus 1 (second ed.). Münster: Libreria Regensbergiana. (in Latin) pp. 356.
- Eubel, Conradus, ed. (1914). Hierarchia catholica, Tomus 2 (second ed.). Münster: Libreria Regensbergiana. (in Latin) p. 199.
- Eubel, Conradus; Gulik, Guilelmus, eds. (1923). Hierarchia catholica, Tomus 3 (second ed.). Münster: Libreria Regensbergiana. p. 253.
- Gauchat, Patritius (Patrice) (1935). Hierarchia catholica IV (1592–1667). Münster: Libraria Regensbergiana. pp. 252.
- Ritzler, Remigius; Sefrin, Pirminus (1952). Hierarchia catholica medii et recentis aevi V (1667–1730). Patavii: Messagero di S. Antonio. pp. 280.
- Ritzler, Remigius; Sefrin, Pirminus (1958). Hierarchia catholica medii et recentis aevi VI (1730–1799). Patavii: Messagero di S. Antonio. p. 301.
- Sainte-Marthe, Denis de; Hauréau, Barthélemy (1739). Gallia Christiana: In Provincias Ecclesiasticas Distributa, De provincia Narbonensi (in Latin). Vol. Tomus sextus (VI). Paris: Typographia Regia. pp. 1–222, Instrumenta, 1–72.

=== Studies ===
- De Vic, Cl.; Vaissete, J. (1876). Histoire generale de Languedoc (in French). Vol. Tome IV. Toulouse: Edouard Privat. pp. 243–260. [Archbishops of Narbonne].
- Duchesne, Louis (1907). Fastes épiscopaux de l'ancienne Gaule: I. Provinces du Sud-Est (in French) (2nd ed.). Paris: Fontemoing. pp. 300–306.
- Jean, Armand (1891). Les évêques et les archevêques de France depuis 1682 jusqu'à 1801 (in French). Paris: A. Picard. pp. 250–254.
- Mortet, Victor (1899). Notes historiques et archéologiques sur la cathédrale: le cloitre et le palais archiépiscopal de Narbonne 13e-16e siècles (in French). Toulouse: E. Privat.
