= Argebad =

Argebad or Argebaud was the Visigothic Archbishop of Narbonne (fl. c. 672). He played a major role in the Septimanian rebellion in 672 A.D.

Argebad was a strong supporter of King Recceswinth, and remained a supporter of his successor.

== Sources ==
- Thompson, E. A. The Goths in Spain. Oxford: Clarendon Press, 1969.
