= Eleventh Council of Toledo =

675 Ecnumenical Council

The Eleventh Council of Toledo convened first on 7 November 675. It was attended by seventeen bishops and two deacons representing the sees of Segovia and Ergávica (also Ercávica or Arcávica) as well as five abbots.

The council dealt mostly with religious matters, primarily ecclesiastical disciplinary reform. It also ordered the celebration of annual synods in all the provinces as they had theretofore been in Carthaginiensis alone. These synods would be held at the order of the king on a date determined by him and the metropolitan.

The singing of the Psalms was standardised in all the provinces and sanctions were placed on bishops who had relations with noblewomen.

The council tried to curb simony by making bishops swear an oath that they had neither paid nor promised to pay for their see before their consecration. If the oath was ignored, the consecration could not take place. Those guilty of simony were exiled for two years, but could retain their sees. This last provision probably signifies that simony was becoming less common already.

This small local Council, attended by only 17 bishops, has little significance today except for the confession of faith which was recited at its opening. The official value of this document consists in the fact that in subsequent centuries it was kept in highest regard and considered a genuine expression of the Trinitarian faith; it is one of the important formulas of doctrine. In fact, hardly anywhere is the reflection of the early Church on the Trinitarian mystery and on Christ expressed with such precision and acumen as in this Creed which sums up the tradition of the earlier Councils and patristic theology of the West.

== Sources ==
- Thompson, E. A. (1969), The Goths in Spain, Oxford: Clarendon Press.
- Concilium Toletanum undecimum, minutes from the Collectio Hispana Gallica Augustodunensis (Vat. lat. 1341)
- Neuner and Dupuis, The Christian Faith in the Doctrinal Documents of the Catholic Church, (New York; Alba House, 1982), pp. 102-106.
