= Richard de Millau =

Richard de Millau (Milhau) was an 11th-century Cardinal and a major player in the Gregorian reform implemented in the South of France at the turn of the eleventh and twelfth centuries.

== Career ==
He entered the Order of Saint Benedict early in life and first entered the monastery of S. Paolo fuori le mura, Rome.

He was created cardinal in 1078, elected abbot of Saint-Victor de Marseille (1079–1106), appointed papal legate, then Archbishop of Narbonne (1106–1121), he was a major player in papal policy to regain control of the hierarchy the Church, between Toulouse and Marseille. He was involved in the investiture quarrel between the papacy and the Emperor of the Holy Roman Empire between 1075 and 1122. Much of which revolved around the Provençal lands in the Kingdom of Burgundy, attached to the Holy Roman Empire.

== Family ==
Born about 1052 into an extremely powerful house at the time, his family were of viscounts of Millau, and their actions involved the continuity of power strategies between the various aristocratic families of France. He was the fourth child of Richard II (? – 1051), Vicount de Millau (1023) and his wife Rixinde of Narbonne. His brother Bernat had been abbot of abbé de Saint-Victor before him. He was made Archbishop of Narbonne, in circumstance of controversy and held the see from 1106 until his death. His nephew Arnaud de Lévézou would also be Bishop of Narbonne and other nephews would hold see in Arles and d'Aix.

His father Richard was Viscount of Millau and Rixinde, His mother a daughter of Bérenger, Viscount of Narbonne. So Richard was therefore part of the viscount family of Millau and the Gévaudan, holders of the Rodez County, Count of Toulouse. Through his mother, he is allied to the viscount of Narbonne, and the house of Carcassonne.

Of his siblings tree, (Berenger, Raymond and Hughes) shared the viscountal power. While Richard, his brother Bernard who he succeeded as abbot of Saint-Victor de Marseille entered the church. Through marriage he was connected to the main noble houses in Southern France.

As bishop he granted the Abbey of Saint-Victor de Marseille very large donations and gifts are the source of several important priories born ? and died February 15, 1121.

== Career ==
=== Politics ===
Richard was intimately involved in the quarrel of investitures between the papacy and the Emperor of the Holy Roman Empire between 1075 and 1122. He supported the anti-pope Clement III unto 1083 and was therefore deposited by Pope Gregory VII. when Richard repented, the new Pope reinstalled him.

He was a legate under Pope Gregory VII in Spain in 1078.

However, Richard fell into disgrace again under Pope Victor III however he was reinstated by Pope Urban II, on February 20, 1089, Richard in office.

Medieval Counties of France

In 1104, acting at the request of Pope Paschal II, he chaired a council in Troyes for absolving King Philip I of France and marking the alliance between the kingdom of France and the papacy against the empire.

In 1110 when he was 27, he presided over a council at Clermont and one in Toulouse convened at his request, to suppress damage to the abbey of Mauriac. When his brother died he was given the Abbotship of the Abbey of St Victor.

When Richards maternal uncle Aicard, Archbishop of Arles, took the side of the pope, He was placed as head of Montmajour Abbey by Pope Gregory VII with the Bull of 18 April 1081.

=== Reform ===
Richard becomes the great promoter of the Episcopal reform movement in Provence and Languedoc relying on his powers as Cardinal and Legate. In the early 1080s, Richard succeeds in installing the monks of his monastery on bishoprics beginning with the dioceses closest to the abbey: Marseille and Aix-en-Provence. [8] In Aix, he is a member of the Viscount's family Marseille he has earned the Gregorian cause, in Marseille, a monk of modest origin. Richard also plays an important role in the implementation of the Victorine monks of Marseille in Narbonne city, despite the canonical opposition.

Despite his support for the Gregorian reform, Richard constantly appears as a faithful representative of his family Millau-Gévaudan. Using his role of leader of the reform movement and its proximity to the abbey of St. Victor, it encourages "out of his family reduced its mountain" and close to accession to important positions power in Provence and Languedoc, to the detriment of other aristocratic families.

Thus, in 1073 [ref. required] play a role, it seems, decisive in the marriage of his nephew Gilbert Gevaudan with Gerberge, the Countess of Provence. In 1112, aside from the estate of the same county, rival local families by intervening to the Counts of Barcelona. It also promotes, against the interests of the family of Narbonne, another of his nephews, Arnaud de Lévézou for his own succession to the Archbishop of Narbonne in 1121. Finally, many indications that this is another nephew, Atton Bruniquel, Richard up in 1115 in the diocese of Arles after the complicated episode of archiépiscopats Aicard and Gibelin.

The action of Richard Millau therefore shows that around the year 1100, the diffusion of ideas in the Gregorian Midi mingles closely with rivalries and local vicomtales comtales families.

=== Building ===
At the Abbey of Saint-Victor he continued the construction on the Grand cartulary of the abbey, which had been begun under his brother Bernat in the 1070s. The work was completed before 1100AD under his direction.

According to Joseph Vaissète, he participated in the appointment of his nephew Atton, of the family of viscounts of Millau – as he and the Countess of Provence Douce – the Archbishopric of Arles in 1115.

He died February 15, 1121, and his nephew Arnaud de Lévézou succeeded as Archbishop of Narbonne 16 April of the same year.
