= Catholic art =

Art produced by or for members of the Catholic Church

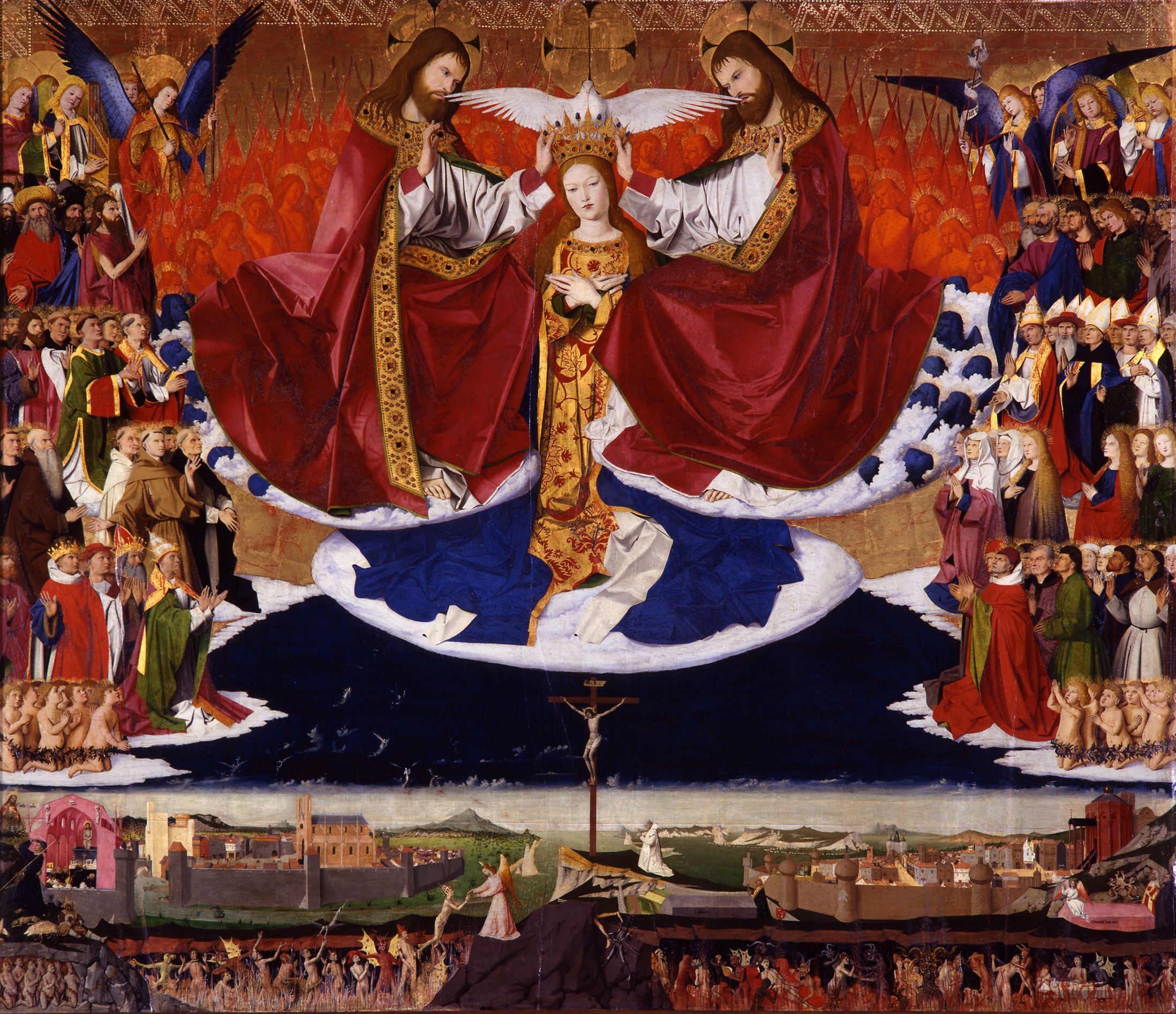
Coronation of the Virgin by Enguerrand Quarton (1453-54), with Christ and God the Father as identical figures, as specified by the cleric who commissioned the work.

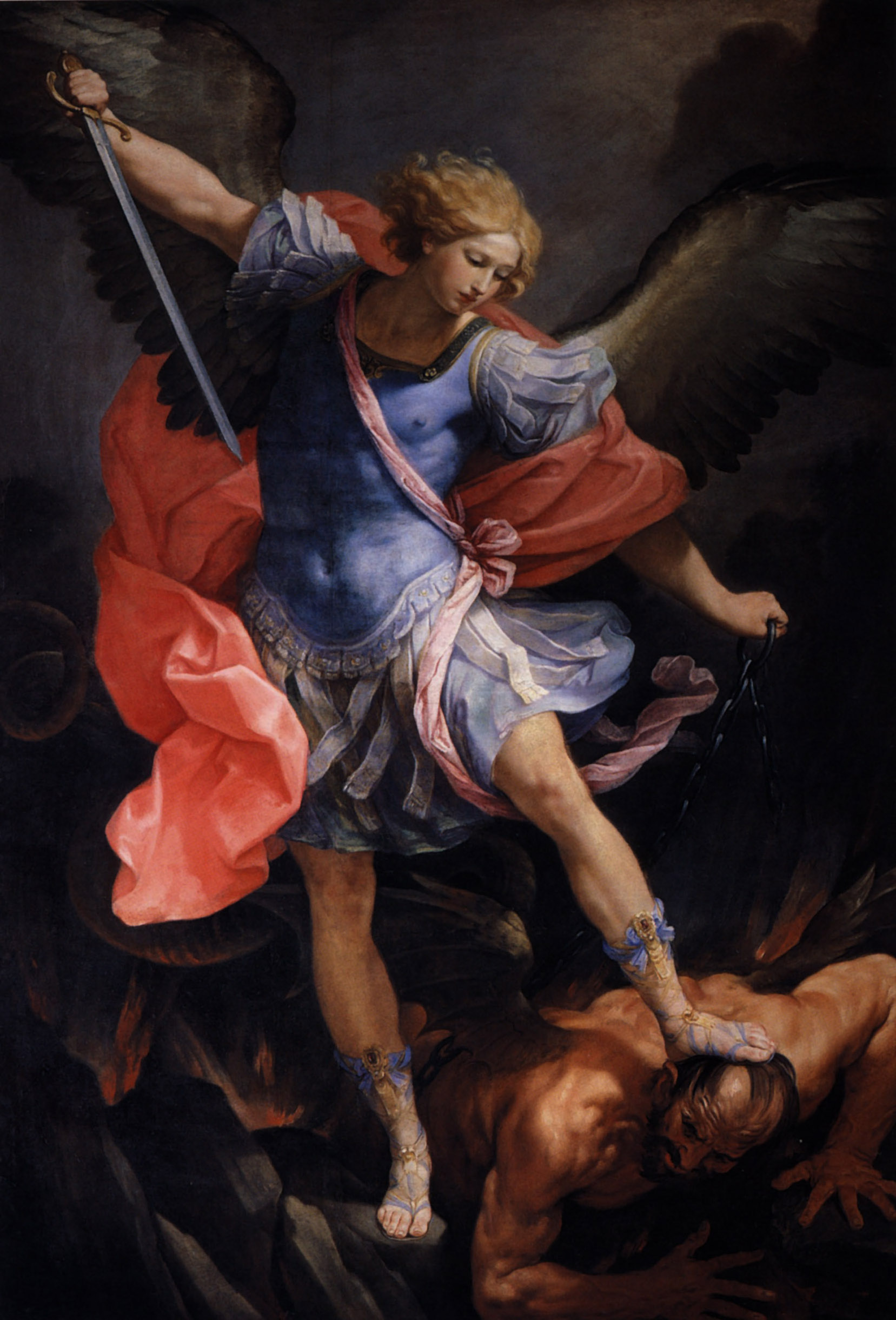
Guido Reni's Archangel Michael tramples Satan (c. 1636, in the Capuchin church of Santa Maria della Concezione, Rome).

Catholic art is art produced by or for members of the Catholic Church. This includes visual art (iconography), sculpture, decorative arts, applied arts, and architecture. In a broader sense, Catholic music and other art may be included as well. Expressions of art may or may not attempt to illustrate, supplement and portray in tangible form Catholic teaching. Catholic art has played a leading role in the history and development of Western art since at least the 4th century. The principal subject matter of Catholic art has been the life and times of Jesus Christ, along with people associated with him, including his disciples, the saints, and motifs from the Catholic Bible.

The earliest surviving artworks are the painted frescoes on the walls of the catacombs and meeting houses of the persecuted Christians of the Roman Empire. The Church in Rome was influenced by the Roman art and the religious artists of the time. The stone sarcophagi of Roman Christians exhibit the earliest surviving carved statuary of Jesus, Mary and other biblical figures. The legalisation of Christianity with the Edict of Milan (313) transformed Catholic art, which adopted richer forms such as mosaics and illuminated manuscripts. The iconoclasm controversy briefly divided the Western Church and the Eastern Church, after which artistic development progressed in separate directions. Romanesque and Gothic art flowered in the Western Church as the style of painting and statuary moved in an increasingly naturalistic direction.

The Protestant Reformation in the 16th century produced new waves of image-destruction, to which the Catholic Church responded with the dramatic, elaborate emotive Baroque and Rococo styles to emphasise beauty as a transcendental. In the 19th century the leadership in Western art moved away from the Catholic Church which, after embracing historical revivalism, was increasingly affected by the modernist movement, a movement that in its "rebellion" against nature counters the church's emphasis on nature as a good creation of God.

== Beginnings ==
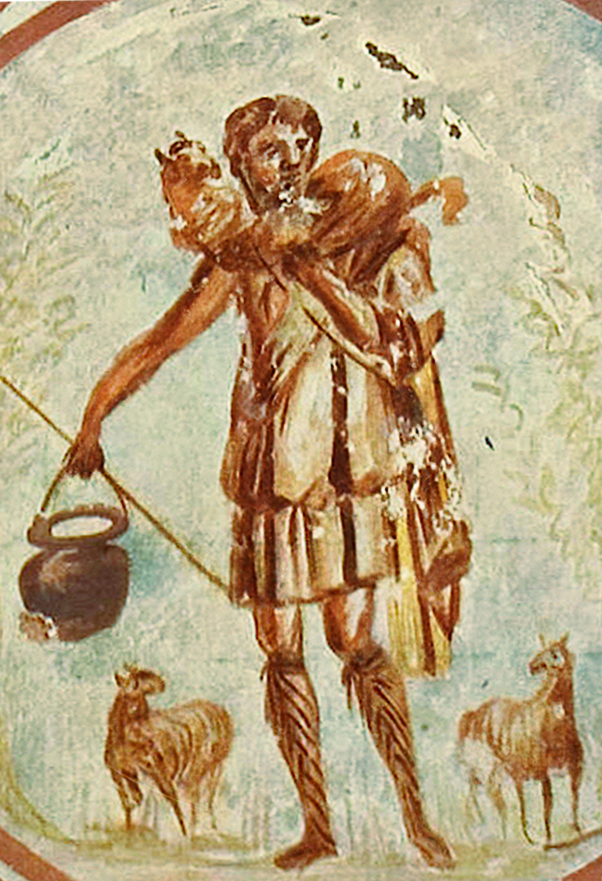
Christ Jesus, the Good Shepherd, 2nd century.

Christian art is nearly as old as Christianity itself. The oldest Christian sculptures are from Roman sarcophagi, dating to the beginning of the 2nd century. As a persecuted sect, however, the earliest Christian images were arcane and meant to be intelligible only to the initiated. Early Christian symbols include the dove, the fish, the lamb, the cross, symbolic representation of the Four Evangelists as beasts, and the Good Shepherd. Early Christians also adapted Roman decorative motifs like the peacock, grapevines, and the good shepherd. It is in the Catacombs of Rome that recognizable representations of Christian figures first appear in number. The recently excavated Dura-Europos house church on the borders of Syria dates from around 265 AD and holds many images from the persecution period. The surviving frescoes of the baptistry room are among the most ancient Christian paintings. We can see the "Good Shepherd", the "Healing of the paralytic" and "Christ and Peter walking on the water". A much larger fresco depicts the two Marys visiting Christ's tomb.

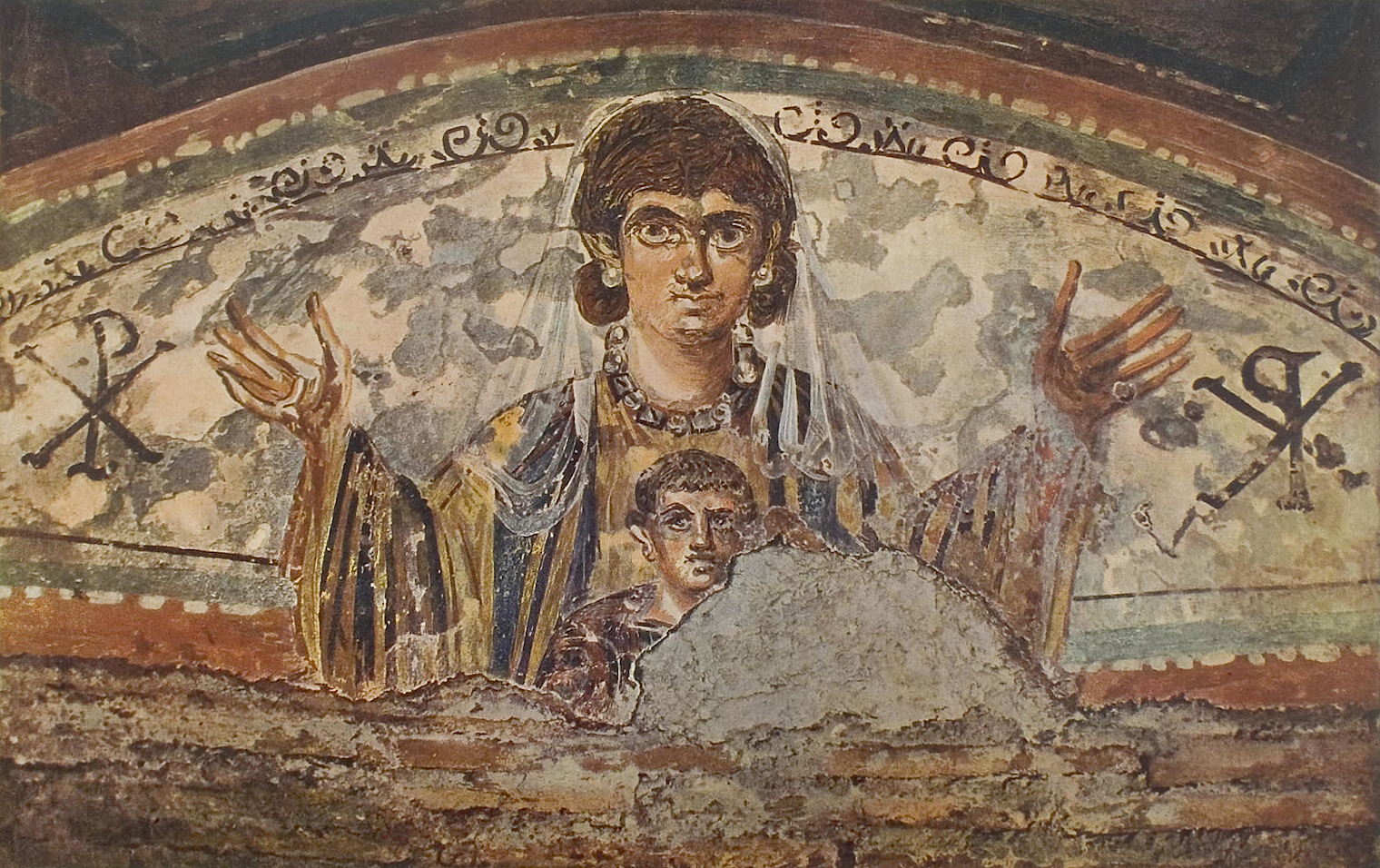
Virgin and Child. Wall painting from the early catacombs, Rome, 4th century.

In the 4th century, the Edict of Milan allowed public Christian worship and led to the development of a monumental Christian art. Christians were able to build edifices for worship larger and more handsome than the furtive meeting places they had been using. Existing architectural formulas for temples were unsuitable because pagan sacrifices occurred outdoors in the sight of the gods, with the temple, housing the cult figures and the treasury, as a backdrop. As an architectural model for large churches, Christians chose the basilica, the Roman public building used for justice and administration. These basilica-churches had a center nave with one or more aisles at each side and a rounded apse at one end: on this raised platform sat the bishop and priests, and also the altar. Although it appears that early altars were constructed of wood (as is the case in the Dura-Europos church) altars of this period were built of stone, and began to become more richly designed. Richer materials could now be used for art, such as the mosaics that decorate Santa Maria Maggiore in Rome and the 5th century basilicas of Ravenna, where narrative sequences begin to develop.

Much Christian art borrowed from Imperial imagery, including Christ in Majesty, and the use of the halo as a symbol of sanctity. Late Antique Christian art replaced classical Hellenistic naturalism with a more abstract aesthetic. The primary purpose of this new style was to convey religious meaning rather than accurately render objects and people. Realistic perspective, proportions, light and colour were ignored in favor of geometric simplification, reverse perspective and standardized conventions to portray individuals and events. Icons of Christ, Mary and the saints, ivory carving, and illuminated manuscripts became important media – even more important in terms of modern understanding, as nearly all of the few surviving works, other than buildings, from the period consist of these portable objects.

== Byzantine and Eastern art ==
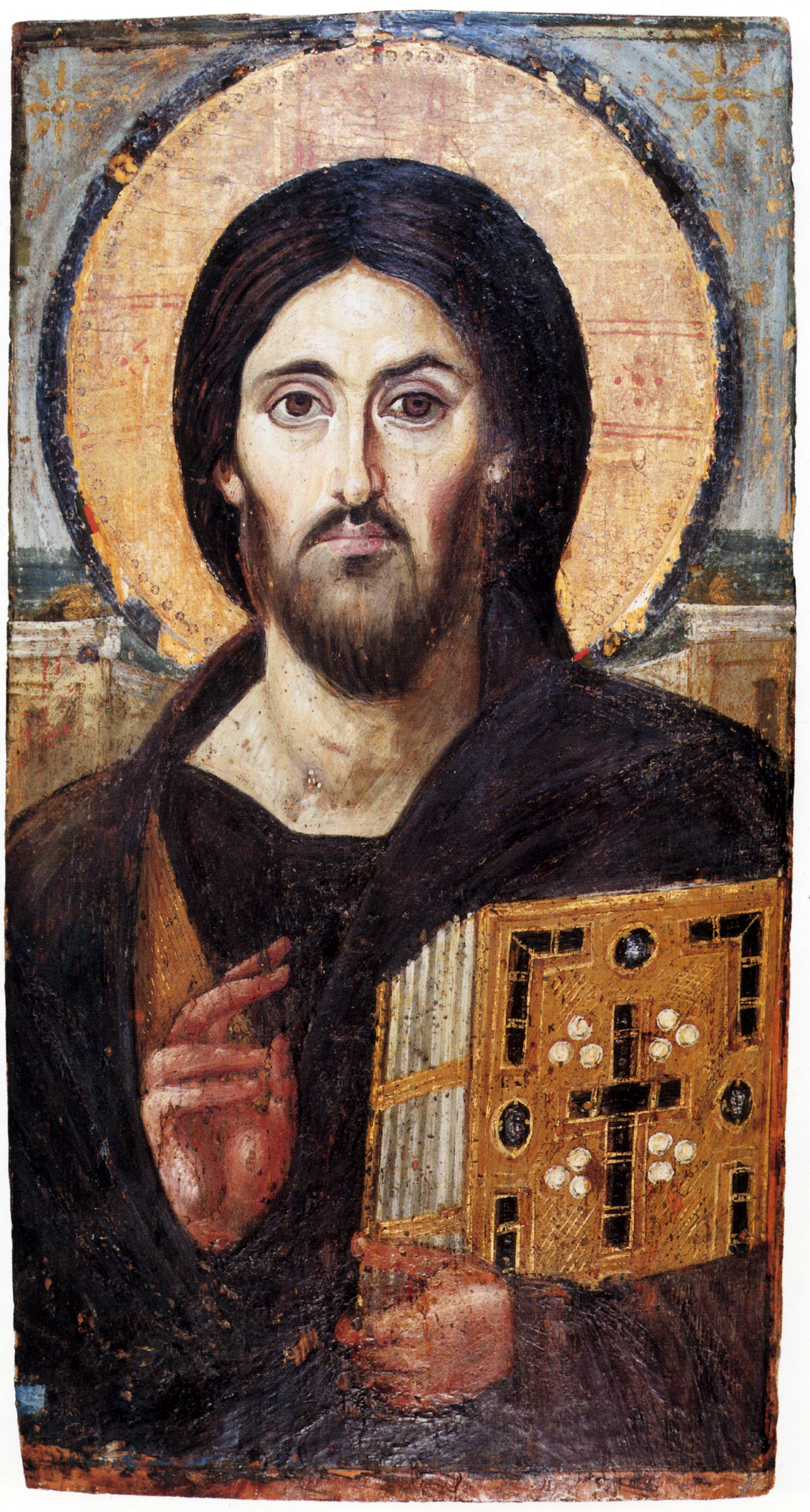
6th? century icon of Christ Pantocrator, a very rare pre-Iconoclasm icon.

The dedication of Constantinople as capital in 330 AD created a great new Christian artistic centre for the Eastern Roman Empire, which soon became a separate political unit. Major Constantinopolitan churches built under the Emperor Constantine and his son, Constantius II, included the original foundations of Hagia Sophia and the Church of the Holy Apostles. As the Western Roman Empire disintegrated and was taken over by "barbarian" peoples, the art of the Byzantine Empire reached levels of sophistication, power and artistry not previously seen in Christian art, and set the standards for those parts of the West still in touch with Constantinople.

This achievement was checked by the controversy over the use of graven images and the proper interpretation of the Second Commandment, which led to the crisis of iconoclasm or destruction of religious images, which rocked the Empire between 726 and 843. The restoration of orthodox iconodulism resulted in a strict standardization of religious imagery within the Eastern Orthodox Church. Byzantine art became increasingly conservative, as the form of images themselves, many accorded divine origin or thought to have been painted by Saint Luke or other figures, was held to have a status not far off that of a scriptural text. They could be copied, but not improved upon. As a concession to Iconoclast sentiment, monumental religious sculpture was effectively banned. Neither of these attitudes were held in Western Europe, but Byzantine art nonetheless had great influence there until the High Middle Ages, and remained very popular long after that, with vast numbers of icons of the Cretan School exported to Europe as late as the Renaissance. Where possible, Byzantine artists were borrowed for projects such as mosaics in Venice and Palermo. The enigmatic frescoes at Castelseprio may be an example of work by a Greek artist working in Italy.

The art of Eastern Catholicism has always been rather closer to the Orthodox art of Greece and Russia and in countries near the Orthodox world, notably Poland, Catholic art has many Orthodox influences. The Black Madonna of Częstochowa may well have been of Byzantine origin – it has been repainted and this is hard to tell. Other images that are certainly of Greek origin, like the Salus Populi Romani and Our Lady of Perpetual Help, both icons in Rome, have been subjects of specific veneration for centuries.

Although the influence has often been resisted, especially in Russia, Catholic art has also affected Orthodox depictions in many respects, especially in countries like Romania, and in the post-Byzantine Cretan School, which led Greek Orthodox art under Venetian rule in the 15th and 16th centuries. El Greco left Crete when relatively young, but Michael Damaskinos returned after a brief period in Venice, and was able to switch between Italian and Greek styles. Even the traditionalist Theophanes the Cretan, working mainly on Mount Athos, nevertheless shows unmistakable Western influence.

== Catholic doctrine on sacred images ==
The Catholic theological position on sacred images has remained effectively identical to that set out in the Libri Carolini, although this, the fullest medieval expression of Western views on images, was in fact unknown during the Middle Ages. It was prepared circa 790 for Charlemagne after a bad translation had led his court to believe that the Byzantine Second Council of Nicaea had approved the worship of images, which in fact was not the case. The Catholic counterblast set out a middle course between the extreme positions of Byzantine iconoclasm and the iconodules, approving the veneration of images for what they represented, but not accepting what became the Orthodox position, that images partook in some degree of the nature of the thing they represented (a belief later to resurface in the West in Renaissance Neo-Platonism).

To the Western church images were just objects made by craftsmen, to be utilized for stimulating the senses of the faithful, and to be respected for the sake of the subject represented, not in themselves. Although in popular devotional practice a tendency to go beyond these limits has often been present, the church was, before the advent of the idea of collecting old art, usually brutal in disposing of images no longer needed, much to the regret of art historians. Most monumental sculpture of the first millennium that has survived was broken up and reused as rubble in the re-building of churches.

In practical matters relating to the use of images, as opposed to their theoretical place in theology, the Libri Carolini were at the anti-iconic end of the spectrum of Catholic views, being for example rather disapproving of the lighting of candles before images. Such views were often expressed by individual church leaders, such as the famous example of Saint Bernard of Clairvaux, although many others leant the other way, and encouraged and commissioned art for their churches. Bernard was in fact only opposed to decorative imagery in monasteries that was not specifically religious, and popular preachers like Saint Bernardino of Siena and Savonarola regularly targeted secular images owned by the laity.

== Early Middle Ages ==
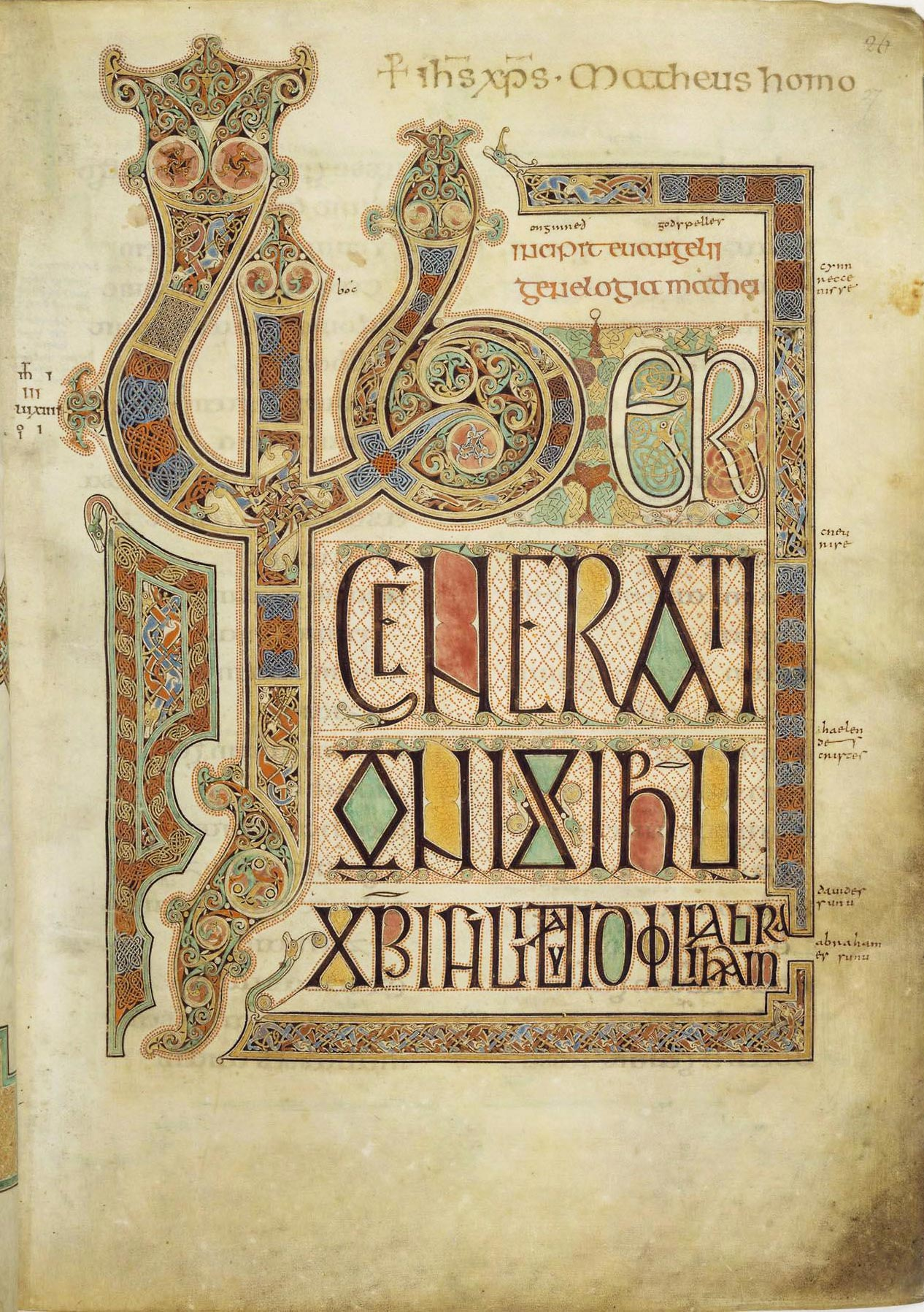
Folio 27r from the Lindisfarne Gospels contains the incipit Liber generationis of the Gospel of Matthew.

While the Western Roman Empire's political structure collapsed after the fall of Rome, the Church continued to fund art where it could. The most numerous surviving works of the early period are illuminated manuscripts, at this date all presumably created by the clergy, often including abbots and other senior figures. The monastic hybrid between "barbarian" decorative styles and the book in the Insular art of the British Isles from the 7th century was to be enormously influential in European art for the rest of the Middle Ages, providing an alternative path to classicism, transmitted to the continent by the Hiberno-Scottish mission. At this period the Gospel book, with figurative art confined mostly to Evangelist portraits, was usually the type of book most lavishly decorated; the Book of Kells is the most famous example.

The 9th century Emperor Charlemagne set out to create works of art appropriate to the status of his revived Empire. Carolingian and Ottonian art was largely confined to the circle of the Imperial court and different monastic centres, each of which had its own distinct artistic style. Carolingian artists consciously tried to emulate such examples of Byzantine and Late Antique art as were available to them, copying manuscripts like the Chronography of 354 and producing works like the Utrecht Psalter, which still divides art historians as to whether it is a copy of a much earlier manuscript, or an original Carolingian creation. This in turn was copied three times in England, lastly in an Early Gothic style.

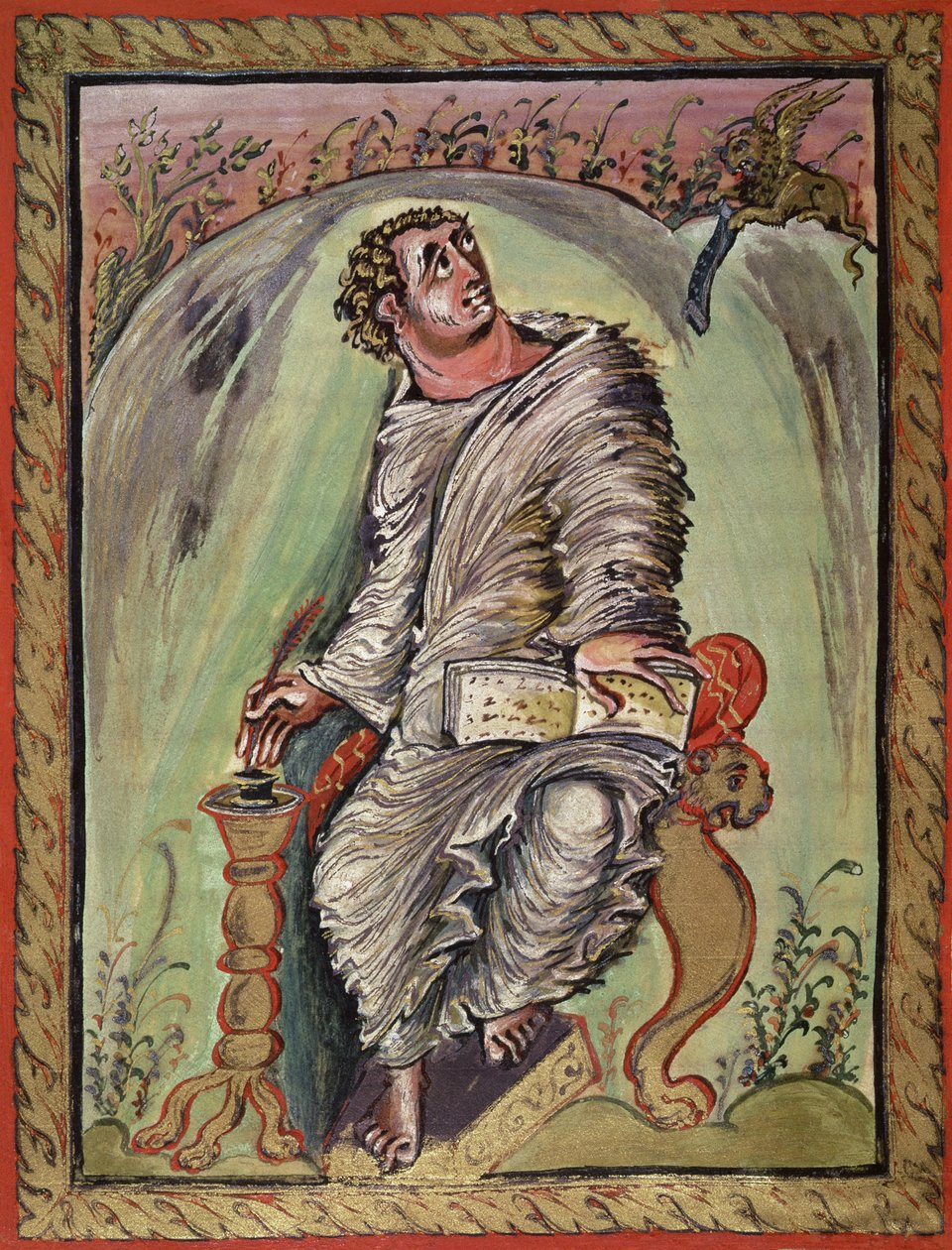
Saint Mark, from the Carolingian Ebbo Gospels.

Ivory carvings, often for book covers, drew on the diptychs of Late Antiquity. For example, the front and back covers of the Lorsch Gospels are of a 6th-century Imperial triumph, adapted to the triumph of Christ and the Virgin. However, they also drew on the Insular tradition, especially for decorative detail, whilst greatly improving on that in terms of the depiction of the human figure. Copies of the scriptures or liturgical books illustrated on vellum and adorned with precious metals were produced in abbeys and nunneries across Western Europe. A work like the Stockholm Codex Aureus ("Gold Book") might be written in gold leaf on purple vellum, in imitation of Roman and Byzantine Imperial manuscripts. Anglo-Saxon art was often freer, making more use of lively line drawings, and there were other distinct traditions, such as the group of extraordinary Mozarabic manuscripts from Spain, including the Saint-Sever Beatus, and those in Girona and the Morgan Library.

Charlemagne had a life-size crucifix with the figure of Christ in precious metal in his Palatine Chapel in Aachen, and many such objects, all now vanished, are recorded in large Anglo-Saxon churches and elsewhere. The Golden Madonna of Essen and a few smaller reliquary figures are now all that remain of this spectacular tradition, completely outside Byzantine norms. Like the Essen figure, these were presumably all made of thin sheets of gold or silver supported by a wooden core.

== Romanesque ==
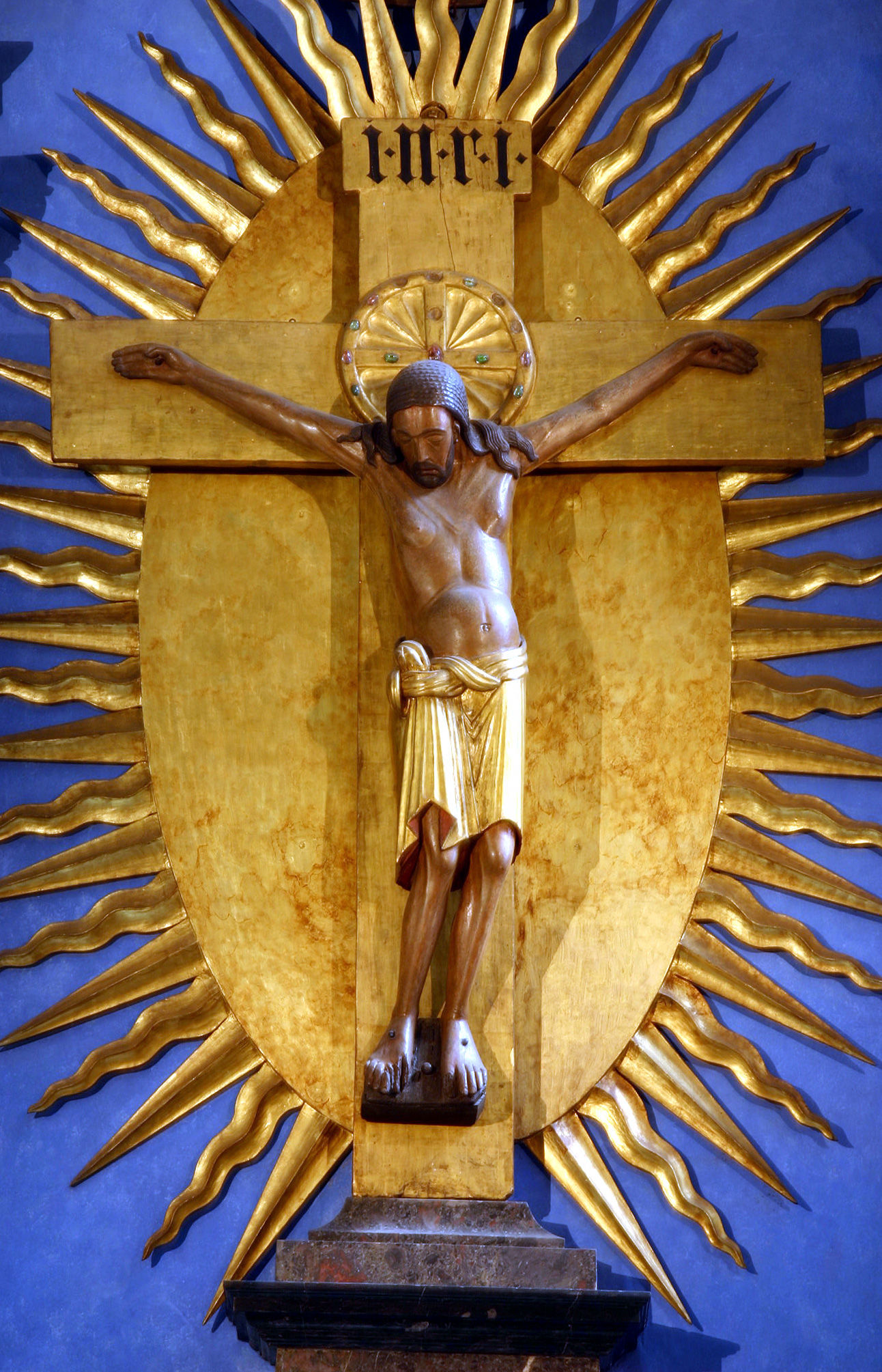
The Gero Cross of about 960 (frame later).

Romanesque art, long preceded by the Pre-Romanesque, developed in Western Europe from approximately 1000 AD until the rise of the Gothic style. Church-building was characterized by an increase in height and overall size. Vaulted roofs were supported by thick stone walls, massive pillars and rounded arches. The dark interiors were illumined by frescoes of Jesus, Mary and the saints, often based on Byzantine models.

Carvings in stone adorned the exteriors and interiors, particularly the tympanum above the main entrance, which often featured a Christ in Majesty or in Judgement, and the large wooden crucifix was a German innovation right at the start of the period. The capitals of columns were also often elaborately carved with figurative scenes. The ensemble of large and well-preserved churches at Cologne, then the largest city north of the Alps, and Segovia in Spain, are among the best places today to appreciate the impact of the new larger churches on a city landscape, but many individual buildings exist, from Durham, Ely and Tournai Cathedrals to large numbers of individual churches, especially in Southern France and Italy. In more prosperous areas, many Romanesque churches survive covered up by a Baroque makeover, much easier to do with these than a Gothic church.

Few of the large wall-paintings that originally covered most churches have survived in good condition. The Last Judgement was normally shown on the western wall, with a Christ in Majesty in the apse semi-dome. Extensive narrative cycles of the Life of Christ were developed, and the Bible, with the Psalter, became the typical focus of illumination, with much use of historiated initials. Metalwork, including decoration in enamel, became very sophisticated, and many spectacular shrines made to hold relics have survived, of which the best known is the Shrine of the Three Kings at Cologne Cathedral by Nicholas of Verdun and others (ca 1180–1225).

== Gothic art ==
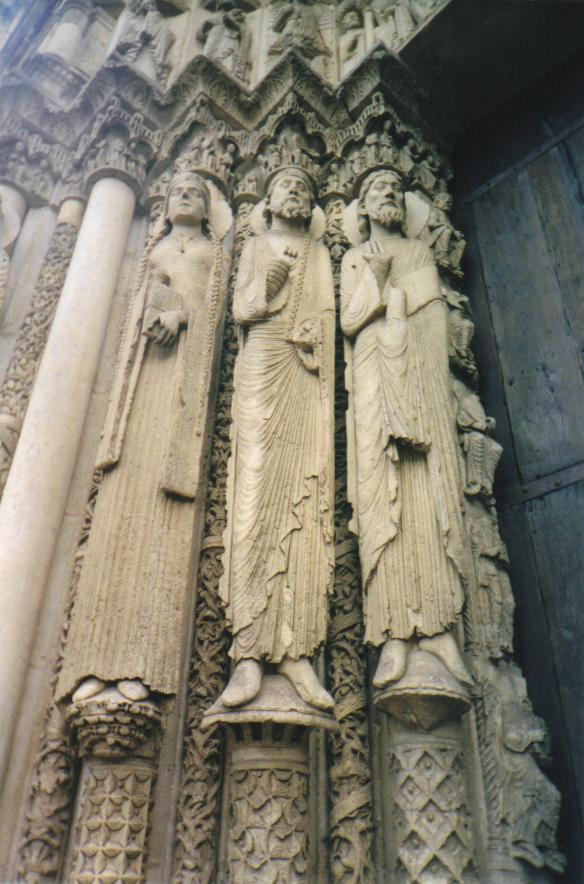
The Western (Royal) Portal at Chartres Cathedral (ca. 1145). These architectural statues are among the earliest Gothic sculptures and were a revolution in style and the model for a generation of sculptors.

Gothic art emerged in France in the mid-12th century. The Basilica at Saint-Denis built by Abbot Suger was the first major building in the Gothic style. New monastic orders, especially the Cistercians and the Carthusians, were important builders who developed distinctive styles which they disseminated across Europe. The Franciscan friars built functional city churches with huge open naves for preaching to large congregations. However, regional variations remained important, even when, by the late 14th century, a coherent universal style known as International Gothic had evolved, which continued until the late 15th century, and beyond in many areas. The principal media of Gothic art were sculpture, panel painting, stained glass, fresco and the illuminated manuscript, though religious imagery was also expressed in metalwork, tapestries and embroidered vestments. The architectural innovations of the pointed arch and the flying buttress, allowed taller, lighter churches with large areas of glazed window. Gothic art made full use of this new environment, telling a narrative story through pictures, sculpture, stained glass and soaring architecture. Chartres Cathedral is a prime example of this.

Gothic art was often typological in nature, reflecting a belief that the events of the Old Testament pre-figured those of the New, and that that was indeed their main significance. Old and New Testament scenes were shown side by side in works like the Speculum Humanae Salvationis, and the decoration of churches. The Gothic period coincided with a great resurgence in Marian devotion, in which the visual arts played a major part. Images of the Virgin Mary developed from the Byzantine hieratic types, through the Coronation of the Virgin, to more human and intimate types, and cycles of the Life of the Virgin were very popular. Artists like Giotto, Fra Angelico and Pietro Lorenzetti in Italy, and Early Netherlandish painting, brought realism and a more natural humanity to art. Western artists, and their patrons, became much more confident in innovative iconography, and much more originality is seen, although copied formulae were still used by most artists. The book of hours was developed, mainly for the lay user able to afford them – the earliest known example seems to have written for an unknown laywoman living in a small village near Oxford in about 1240 – and now royal and aristocratic examples became the type of manuscript most often lavishly decorated. Most religious art, including illuminated manuscripts, was now produced by lay artists, but the commissioning patron often specified in detail what the work was to contain.

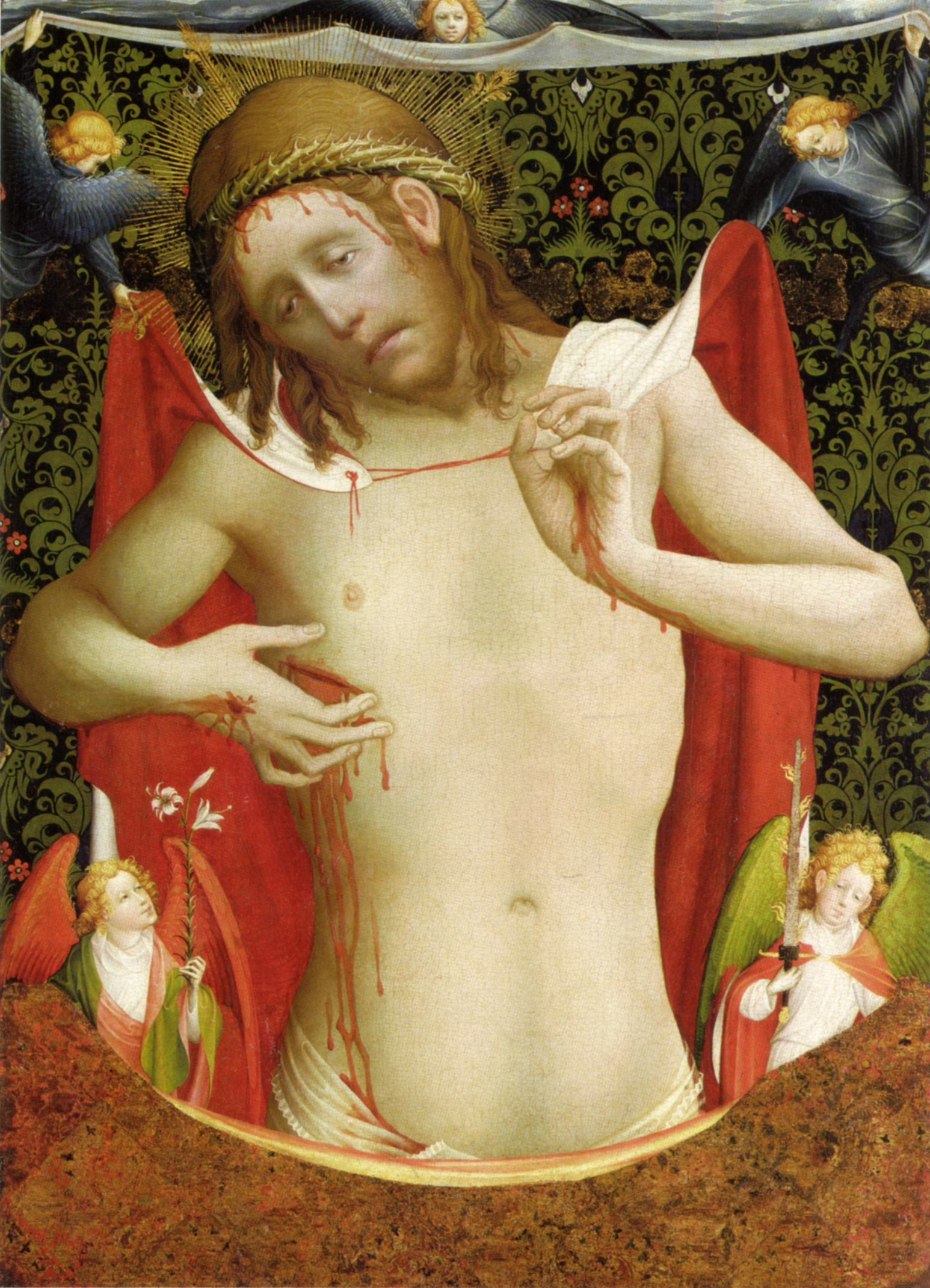
Man of Sorrows by Meister Francke, ca. 1435, Hamburger Kunsthalle

Iconography was affected by changes in theology, with depictions of the Assumption of Mary gaining ground on the older Death of the Virgin, and in devotional practices such as the Devotio Moderna, which produced new treatments of Christ in andachtsbilder subjects such as the Man of Sorrows, Pensive Christ and Pietà, which emphasized his human suffering and vulnerability, in a parallel movement to that in depictions of the Virgin. Many such images were now small oil paintings intended for private meditation and devotion in the homes of the wealthy. Even in Last Judgements Christ was now usually shown exposing his chest to show the wounds of his Passion. Saints were shown more frequently, and altarpieces showed saints relevant to the particular church or donor in attendance on a Crucifixion or enthroned Virgin and Child, or occupying the central space themselves (this usually for works designed for side-chapels). Over the period many ancient iconographical features that originated in New Testament apocrypha were gradually eliminated under clerical pressure, like the midwives at the Nativity, though others were too well-established, and considered harmless.

In Early Netherlandish painting, from the richest cities of Northern Europe, a new minute realism in oil painting was combined with subtle and complex theological allusions, expressed precisely through the highly detailed settings of religious scenes. The Mérode Altarpiece (1420s) of Robert Campin and the Washington Van Eyck Annunciation or Madonna of Chancellor Rolin (both 1430s, by Jan van Eyck) are examples.

In the 15th century, the introduction of cheap prints, mostly in woodcut, made it possible even for peasants to have devotional images at home. These images, tiny at the bottom of the market, often crudely coloured, were sold in thousands but are now extremely rare, most having been pasted to walls. Souvenirs of pilgrimages to shrines, such as clay or lead badges, medals and ampullae stamped with images were also popular and cheap. From the mid-century blockbooks, with both text and images cut as woodcut, seem to have been affordable by parish priests in the Low Countries, where they were most popular. By the end of the century, printed books with illustrations, still mostly on religious subjects, were rapidly becoming accessible to the prosperous middle class, as were engravings of fairly high-quality by printmakers like Israhel van Meckenem and Master E. S.

For the wealthy, small panel paintings, even polyptychs in oil painting, were becoming increasingly popular, often showing donor portraits alongside, though often much smaller than, the Virgin or saints depicted. These were usually displayed in the home.

== Renaissance art ==
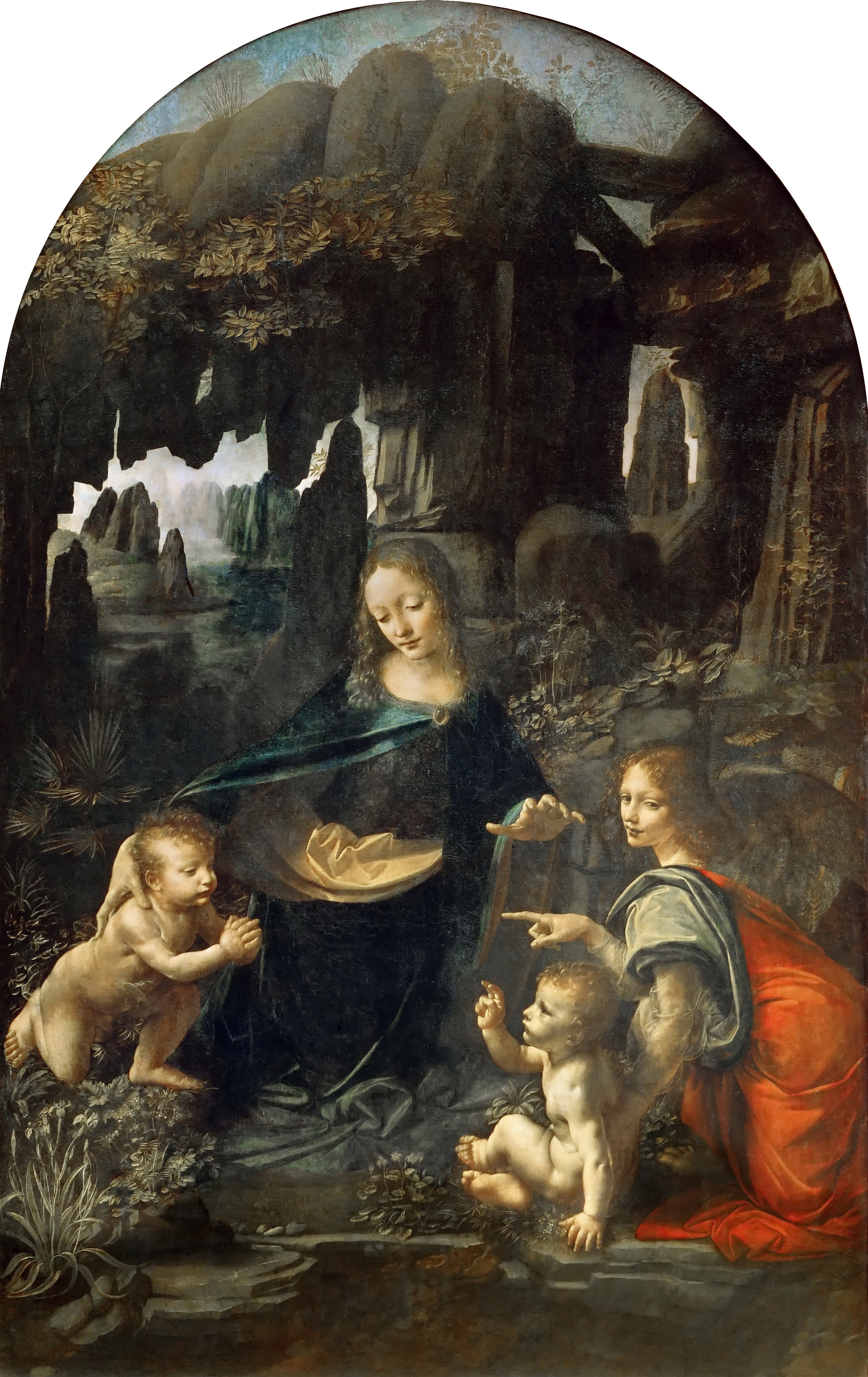
Virgin of the Rocks, (Louvre version), Leonardo da Vinci, 1483–1486

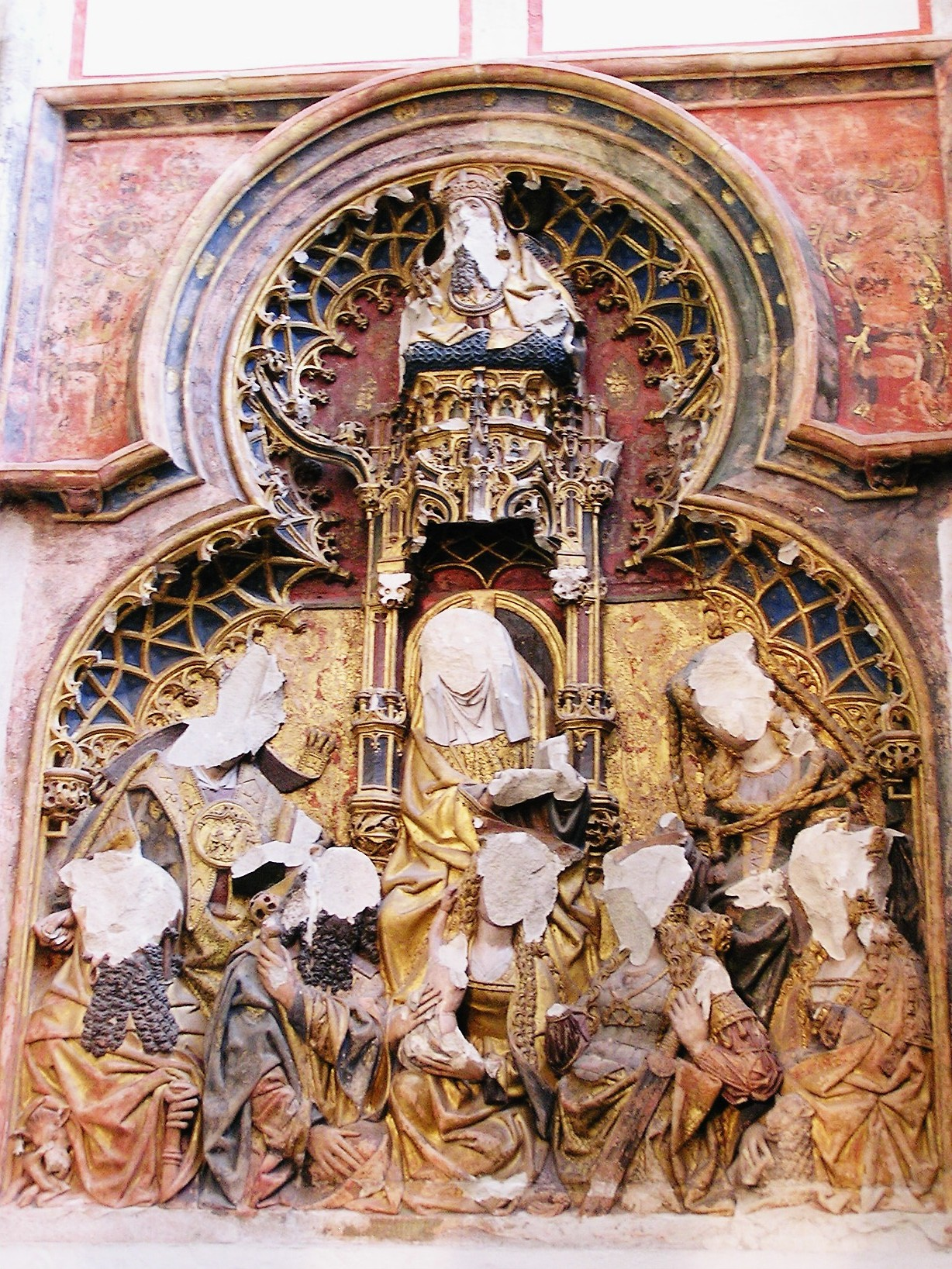
Statues in the Cathedral of Saint Martin, Utrecht, attacked in Reformation iconoclasm in the 16th century.

Renaissance art, heavily influenced by the "rebirth" (French: renaissance) of interest in the art and culture of classical antiquity, initially continued the trends of the preceding period without fundamental changes, but using classical clothing and architectural settings which were after all very appropriate for New Testament scenes. However a clear loss of religious intensity is apparent in many Early Renaissance religious paintings – the famous frescoes in the Tornabuoni Chapel by Domenico Ghirlandaio (1485–1490) seem more interested in the detailed depiction of scenes of bourgeois city life than their actual subjects, the Life of the Virgin and that of John the Baptist, and the Magi Chapel of Benozzo Gozzoli (1459–1461) is more a celebration of Medici status than an Arrival of the Magi. Both these examples (which still used contemporary clothes) come from Florence, the heart of the Early Renaissance, and the place where the charismatic Dominican preacher Savonarola launched his attack on the worldliness of the life and art of the citizens, culminating in his famous Bonfire of the Vanities in 1497; in fact other preachers had been holding similar events for decades, but on a smaller scale. Many Early Renaissance artists, such as Fra Angelico and Botticelli were extremely devout, and the latter was one of many who fell under the influence of Savonarola.

The brief High Renaissance (c. 1490–1520) of Leonardo da Vinci, Michelangelo and Raphael transformed Catholic art more fundamentally, breaking with the old iconography that was thoroughly integrated with theological conventions for original compositions that reflected both artistic imperatives, and the influence of Renaissance humanism. Both Michelangelo and Raphael worked almost exclusively for the Papacy for much of their careers, including the year of 1517, when Martin Luther wrote his Ninety-Five Theses. The connection between the events was not just chronological, as the indulgences that provoked Luther helped to finance the Papal artistic programme, as many historians have pointed out.

Most fifteenth-century pictures from this period were religious pictures. This is self-evident, in one sense, but "religious pictures" refers to more than just a certain range of subject matter; it means that the pictures existed to meet institutional ends. The Church commissioned artwork for three main reasons: The first was indoctrination, clear images were able to relay meaning to an uneducated person. The second was ease of recall, depictions of saints and other religious figures allow for a point of mental contact. The third is to incite awe in the heart of the viewer, John of Genoa believed that this was easier to do with image than with words. Considering these three tenets, it can be assumed that gold was used to inspire awe in the mind and heart of the beholder, where later during the Protestant Reformation the ability to render gold through the use of plain pigments displayed an artist's skill in a way that the application of gold leaf to a panel does not

The Protestant Reformation was a holocaust of art in many parts of Europe. Although Lutheranism was prepared to live with much existing Catholic art so long as it did not become a focus of devotion, the more radical views of Calvin, Zwingli and others saw public religious images of any sort as idolatry, and art was systematically destroyed in areas where their followers held sway. This destructive process continued until the mid-17th century, as religious wars brought periods of iconoclast Protestant control over much of the continent. In England and Scotland destruction of religious art, most intense during the English Commonwealth, was especially heavy. Some stone sculpture, illuminated manuscripts and stained glass windows (expensive to replace) survived, but of the thousands of high quality works of painted and wood-carved art produced in medieval Britain, virtually none remain.

In Rome, the sack of 1527 by the Catholic Emperor Charles V and his largely Protestant mercenary troops was enormously destructive both of art and artists, many of whose biographical records end abruptly. Other artists managed to escape to different parts of Italy, often finding difficulty in picking up the thread of their careers. Italian artists, with the odd exception like Girolamo da Treviso, seem to have had little attraction to Protestantism. In Germany, however, the leading figures such as Albrecht Dürer and his pupils, Lucas Cranach the Elder, Albrecht Altdorfer and the Danube school, and Hans Holbein the Younger all followed the Reformers. The development of German religious painting had come to an abrupt halt by about 1540, although many prints and book illustrations, especially of Old Testament subjects, continued to be produced.

== Council of Trent ==
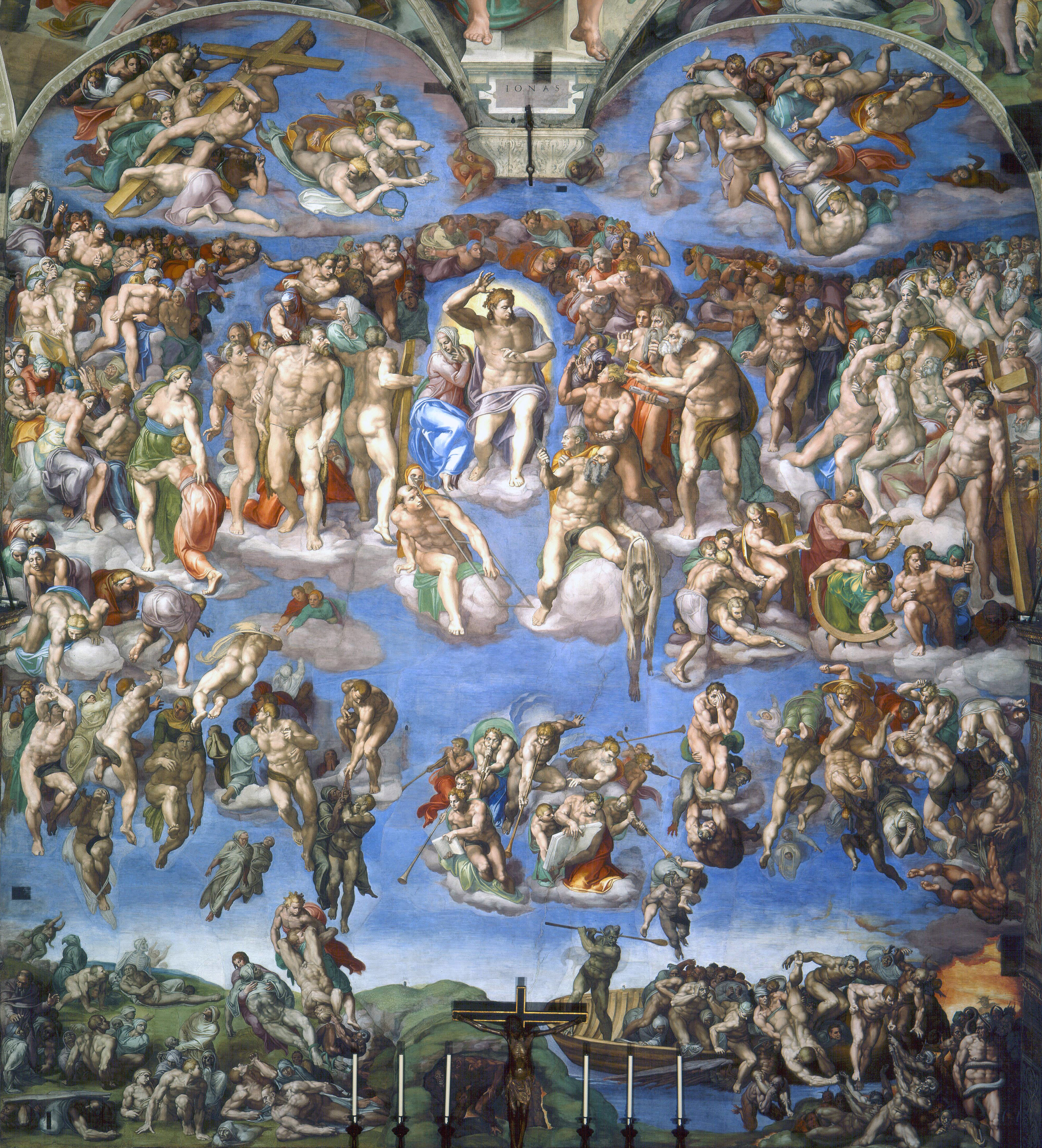
The Last Judgment fresco in the Sistine Chapel by Michelangelo (1534–1541) came under persistent attack in the Counter-Reformation for, among other things, nudity (later painted over for several centuries), not showing Christ seated or bearded, and including the pagan figure of Charon.

Italian painting after 1520, with the notable exception of the art of Venice, developed into Mannerism, a highly sophisticated style, striving for effect, that drew the concern of many churchman that it lacked appeal for the mass of the population. Church pressure to restrain religious imagery affected art from the 1530s and resulted in the decrees of the final session of the Council of Trent in 1563 including short and rather inexplicit passages concerning religious images, which were to have great impact on the development of Catholic art. Previous Catholic Church councils had rarely felt the need to pronounce on these matters, unlike Orthodox ones which have often ruled on specific types of images.

The decree confirmed the traditional doctrine that images only represented the person depicted, and that veneration to them was paid to the person themselves, not the image, and further instructed that:

...every superstition shall be removed ... all lasciviousness be avoided; in such wise that figures shall not be painted or adorned with a beauty exciting to lust... there be nothing seen that is disorderly, or that is unbecomingly or confusedly arranged, nothing that is profane, nothing indecorous, seeing that holiness becometh the house of God. And that these things may be the more faithfully observed, the holy Synod ordains, that no one be allowed to place, or cause to be placed, any unusual image, in any place, or church, howsoever exempted, except that image have been approved of by the bishop ...

Ten years after the decree Paolo Veronese was summoned by the Inquisition to explain why his Last Supper, a huge canvas for the refectory of a monastery, contained, in the words of the Inquisition: "buffoons, drunken Germans, dwarfs and other such scurrilities" as well as extravagant costumes and settings, in what is indeed a fantasy version of a Venetian patrician feast. Veronese was told that he must change his painting within a three-month period – in fact he just changed the title to The Feast in the House of Levi, still an episode from the Gospels, but a less doctrinally central one, and no more was said. But the number of such decorative treatments of religious subjects declined sharply, as did "unbecomingly or confusedly arranged" Mannerist pieces, as a number of books, notably by the Flemish theologian Molanus (De Picturis et Imaginibus Sacris, pro vero earum usu contra abusus ("Treatise on Sacred Images"), 1570), Cardinal Federico Borromeo (De Pictura Sacra) and Cardinal Gabriele Paleotti (Discorso, 1582), and instructions by local bishops, amplified the decrees, often going into minute detail on what was acceptable. One of the earliest of these, Degli Errori dei Pittori (1564), by the Dominican theologian Andrea Gilio da Fabriano, joined the chorus of criticism of Michelangelo's Last Judgement and defended the devout and simple nature of much medieval imagery. But other writers were less sympathetic to medieval art and many traditional iconographies considered without adequate scriptural foundation were in effect prohibited (for example the Swoon of the Virgin), as was any inclusion of classical pagan elements in religious art, and almost all nudity, including that of the infant Jesus. According to the medievalist Émile Mâle, this was "the death of medieval art".

== Baroque art ==
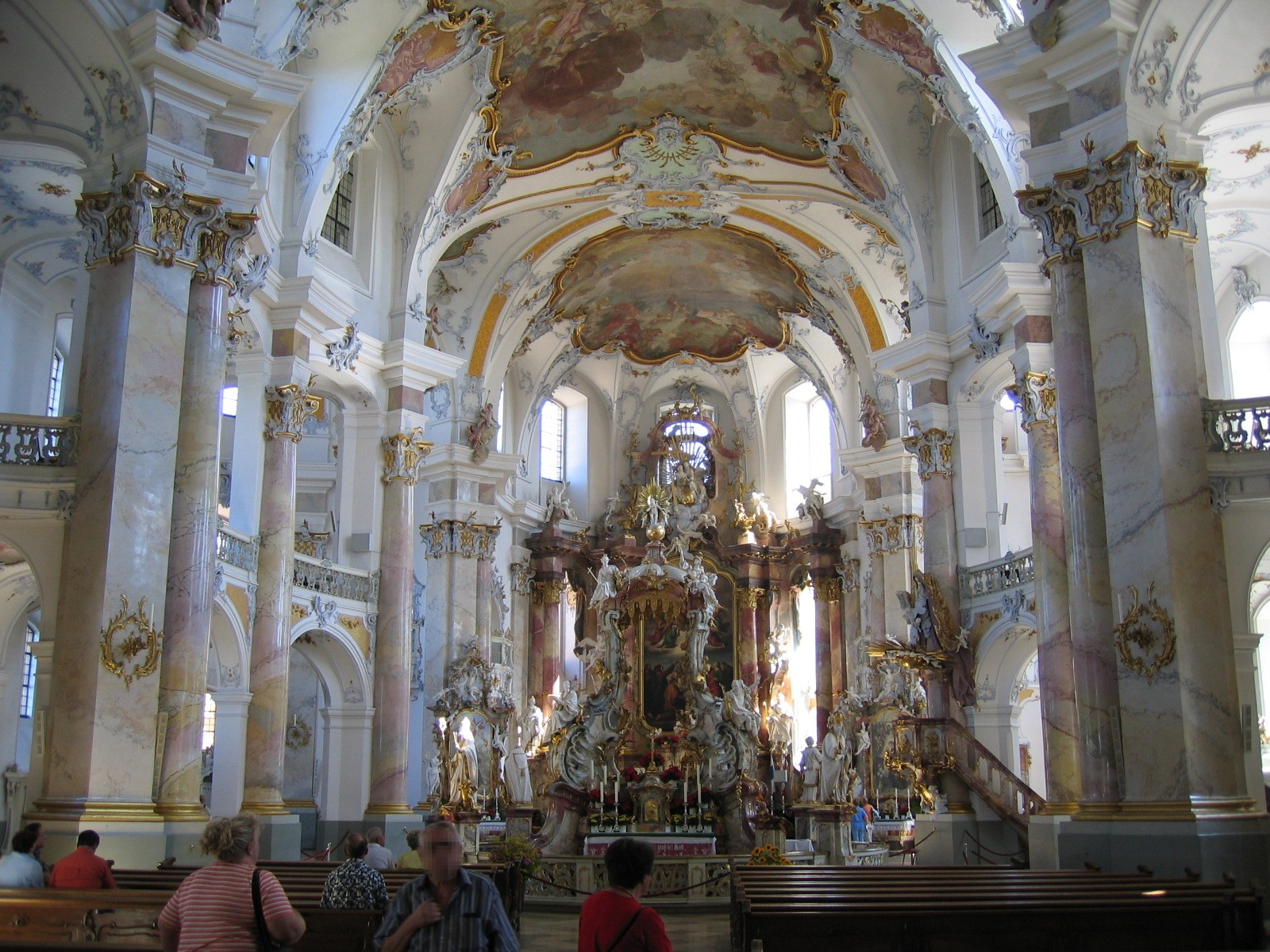
The altar of the Vierzehnheiligen, pilgrimage church in Upper Franconia

Baroque art, developing over the decades following the Council of Trent, though the extent to which this was an influence on it is a matter of debate, certainly met most of the council's requirements, especially in the earlier, simpler phases associated with the Carracci and Caravaggio, who nonetheless met with clerical opposition over the realism of his sacred figures.

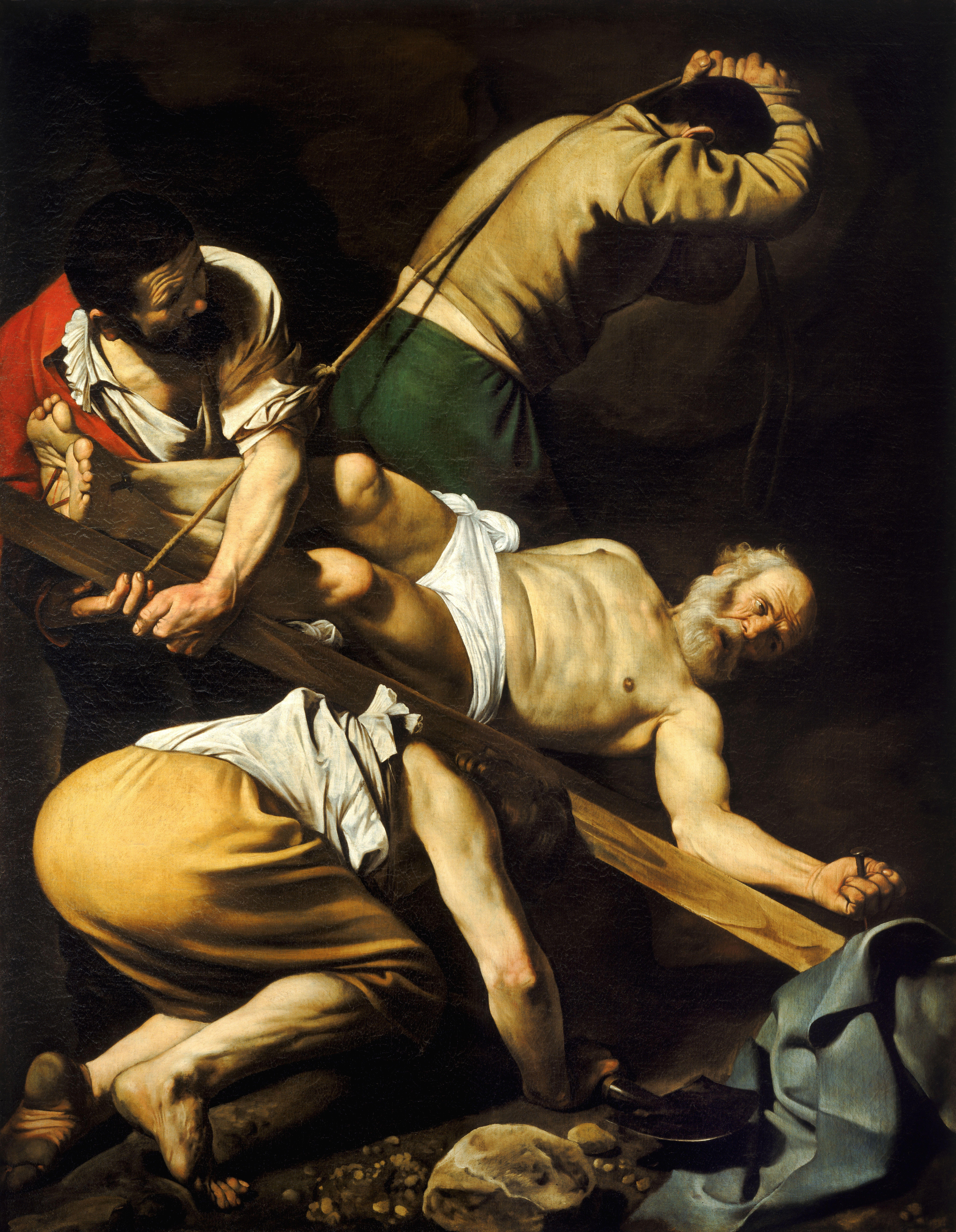
Michelangelo da Caravaggio,The Crucifixion of Saint Peter, 1601. Cerasi Chapel, Santa Maria del Popolo, Rome

Subjects were shown in a direct and dramatic fashion, with relatively few abstruse allusions. Choice of subjects was widened considerably, as Baroque artists delighted in finding new biblical episodes and dramatic moments from the lives of saints. As the movement continued into the 17th century simplicity and realism tended to reduce, more slowly in Spain and France, but the drama remained, produced by the depiction of extreme moments, dramatic movement, colour and chiaroscuro lighting, and if necessary hosts of agitated cherubs and swirling clouds, all intended to overwhelm the worshipper. Architecture and sculpture aimed for the same effects; Bernini (1598–1680) epitomises the Baroque style in those arts. Baroque art spread across Catholic Europe and into the overseas missions of Asia and the Americas, promoted by the Jesuits and Franciscans, highlighting painting and/or sculpture from Quito School, Cuzco School and Chilote School of Religious Imagery.

New iconic subjects popularized in the Baroque period included the Sacred Heart of Jesus, and the Immaculate Conception of Mary; the definitive iconography for the latter seems to have been established by the master and then father-in-law of Diego Velázquez, the painter and theorist Francisco Pacheco, to whom the Inquisition in Seville also contracted the approval of new images. The Assumption of Mary became a very common subject, and (despite a Caravaggio of the subject) the Death of the Virgin became almost extinct in Catholic art; Molanus and others had written against it.

== 18th century ==
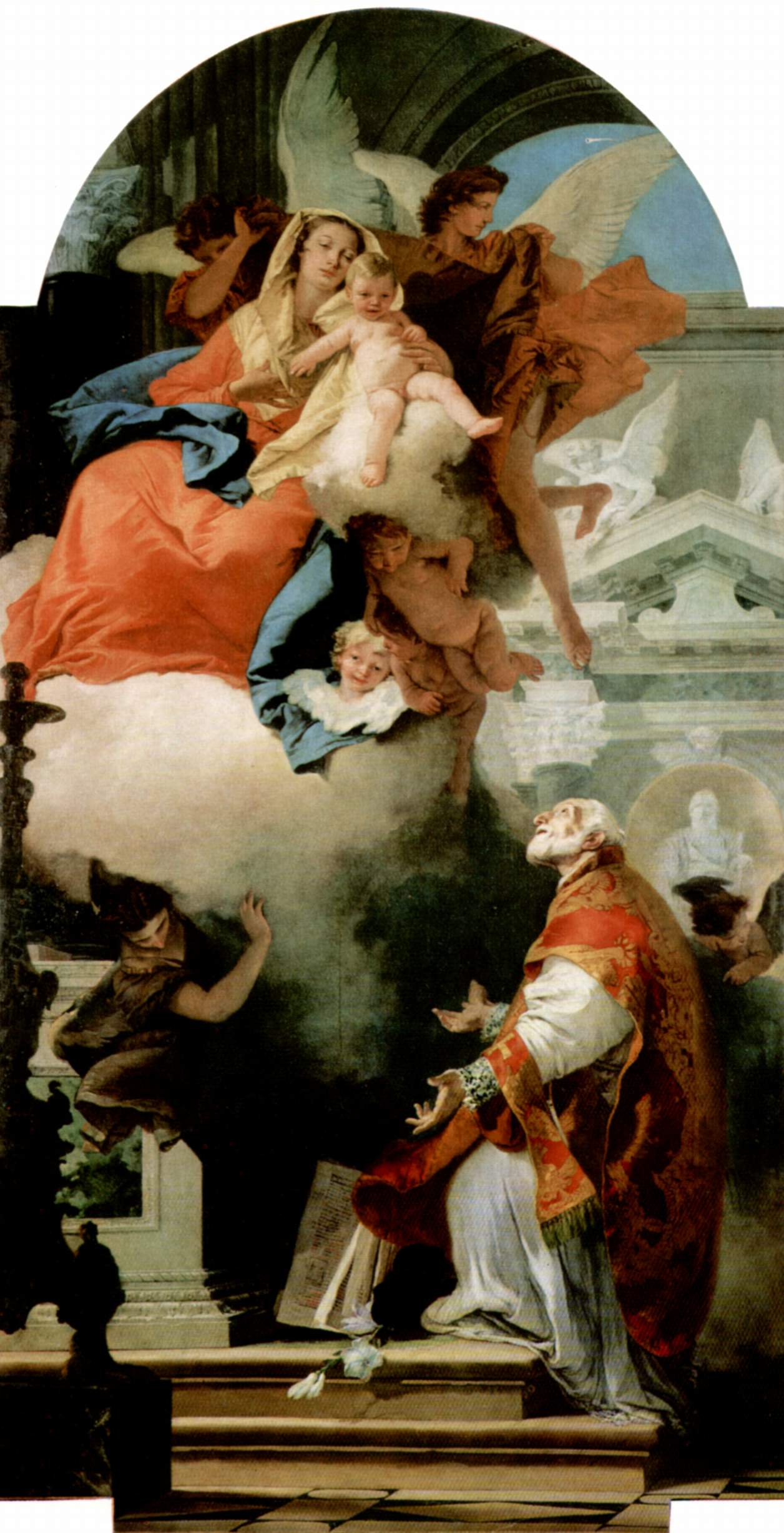
Gianbattista Tiepolo, Madonna and Child with Saint Philip Neri, 1739–40

In the 18th Century, secular Baroque developed into the still more flamboyant but lighter Rococo style, which was difficult to adapt to religious themes, although Gianbattista Tiepolo was able to do so. In the later part of the century there was a reaction, especially in architecture, against the Baroque, and a turning back to more austere classical and Palladian forms.

By now the rate of production of religious art was noticeably slowing down. After a spate of building and re-building in the Baroque period, Catholic countries were mostly clearly overstocked with churches, monasteries and convents, in the case of some places such as Naples, almost absurdly so. The Church was now less important as a patron than royalty and the aristocracy, and the middle class demand for art, mostly secular, was increasing rapidly. Artists could now have a successful career painting portraits, landscapes, still lifes or other genre specialisms, without ever painting a religious subject – something hitherto unusual in the Catholic countries, though long the norm in Protestant ones. The number of sales of paintings, metalwork and other church fittings to private collectors increased during the century, especially in Italy, where the Grand Tour gave rise to networks of dealers and agents. Leonardo da Vinci's London Virgin of the Rocks was sold to the Scottish artist and dealer Gavin Hamilton by the church in Milan that it was painted for in about 1781; the version in the Louvre having apparently been diverted from the same church three centuries earlier by Leonardo himself, to go to the King of France.

The wars following the French Revolution saw large quantities of the finest art, paintings in particular, carefully selected for appropriation by the French armies or the secular regimes they established. Many were sent to Paris for the Louvre (some to eventually be returned, others not) or local museums established by the French, like the Brera in Milan. Suppression of monasteries, which had been under way for decades under Catholic Enlightened despots of the Ancien Régime, for example in the Edict on Idle Institutions (1780) of Joseph II of Austria, intensified considerably. By 1830 much of the best Catholic religious art was on public display in museums, as has been the case ever since. This undoubtedly widened access to many works, and promoted public awareness of the heritage of Catholic art, but at a cost, as objects came to be regarded as of primarily artistic rather than religious significance, and were seen out of their original context and the setting they were designed for.

== 19th and 20th centuries ==
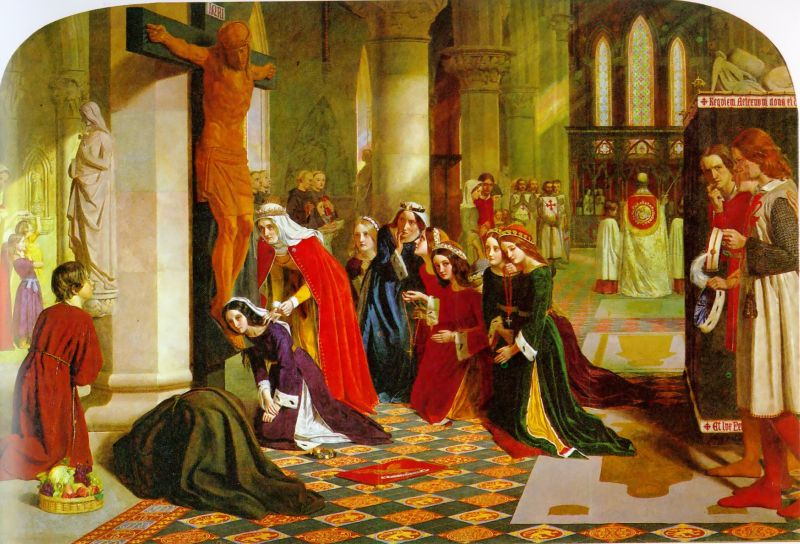
The Renunciation of St. Elizabeth of Hungary (1850) by the Pre-Raphaelite artist James Collinson, a convert to Catholicism

The 19th Century saw a widespread repudiation by both Catholic and Protestant churches of Classicism, which was associated with the French Revolution and Enlightenment secularism. This led to the Gothic Revival, a return to Gothic-influenced forms in architecture, sculpture and painting, led by people such as Augustus Pugin in England and Eugène Viollet-le-Duc in France. Across the world, thousands of Gothic churches and Cathedrals were produced in a new wave of church-building, and the collegiate Gothic style became the norm for other church institutions. Medieval Gothic churches, especially in England and France, were restored, often very heavy-handedly. In painting, similar attitudes led to the German Nazarene movement and the English Pre-Raphaelites. Both movements embraced both Catholic and Protestant members, but included some artists who converted to Catholicism. Outside these and similar movements, the establishment art world produced much less religious painting than at any time since the Roman Empire, though many types of applied art for church fittings in the Gothic style were made. Commercial popular Catholic art flourished using cheaper techniques for mass-reproduction. Colour lithography made it possible to reproduce coloured images cheaply, leading to a much broader circulation of holy cards. Much of this art continued to use watered-down versions of Baroque styles. The Immaculate Heart of Mary was a new subject of the 19th century, and new apparitions at Lourdes and Fátima, as well as new saints, provided new subjects for art.

Architects began to revive other earlier Christian styles, and experiment with new ones, producing results such as Sacre Coeur in Paris, Sagrada Familia in Barcelona and the Byzantine-influenced Westminster Cathedral in London. The 20th century led to the adoption of modernist styles of architecture and art. This movement rejected traditional forms in favour of utilitarian shapes with a bare minimum of decoration. Such art as there was eschewed naturalism and human qualities, favouring stylised and abstract forms. Examples of modernism include the Liverpool Metropolitan Cathedral of Christ the King, and Los Angeles Cathedral.

Modern Catholic artists include Brian Whelan, Efren Ordoñez, Ade Bethune, Imogen Stuart, and Georges Rouault.

== 21st century ==
The early adoption of modernist styles at the dawn of the 21st century continued with the trends from the 20th century. Artists began to experiment with materials and colours. In many cases this contributed to simplifications which led to resemblance to the early Christian art. Simplicity was seen as the best way to bring pure Christian messages to the viewer.

In the 21st century, Catholic art took influences from global art movements such as Japanese anime style. Luce, the official mascot of the 2025 Jubilee, was inspired by anime-style character designs.

== Subjects ==
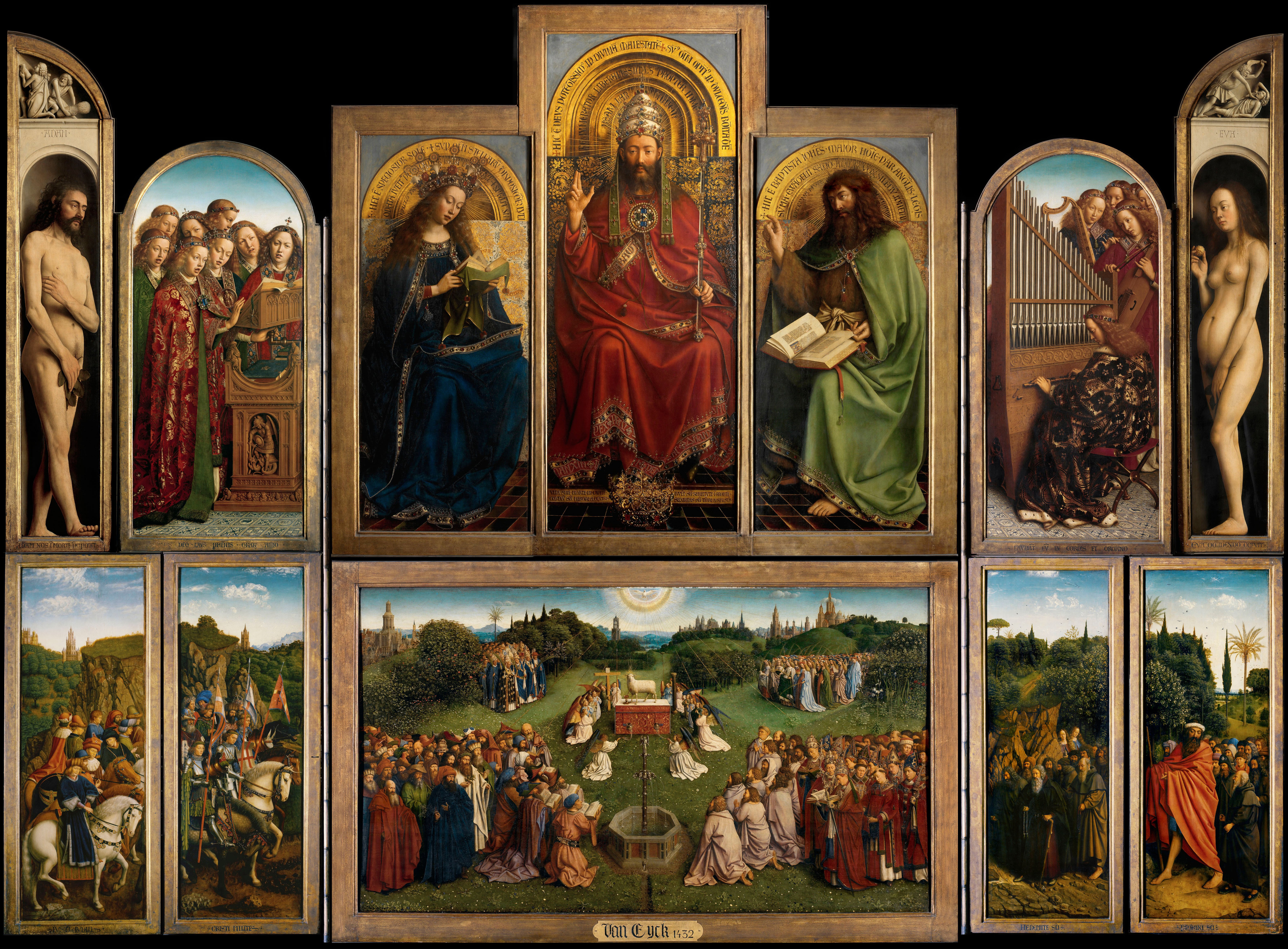
The Ghent Altarpiece: The Adoration of the Lamb (interior view) painted 1432 by Jan van Eyck

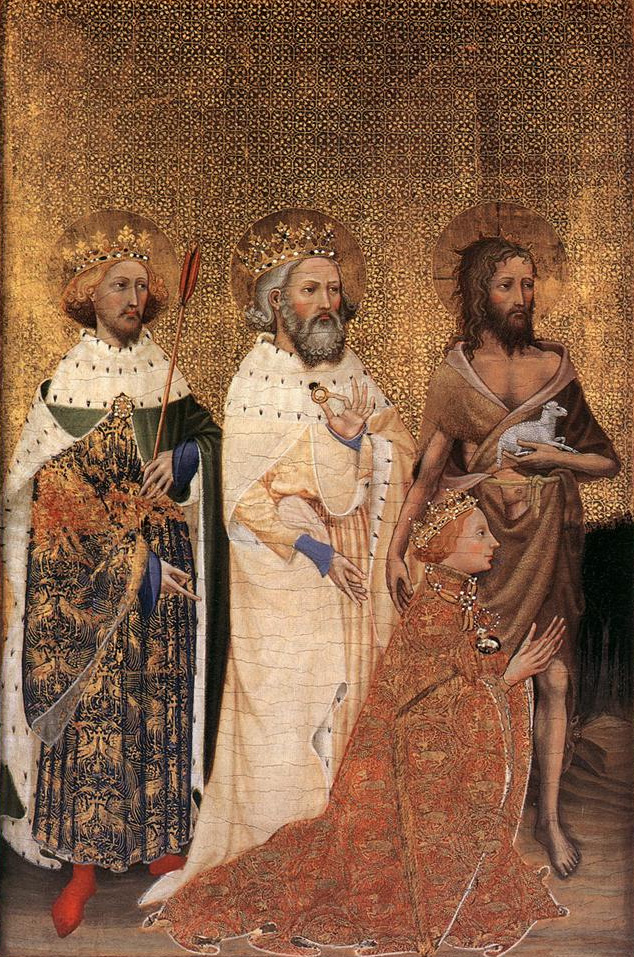
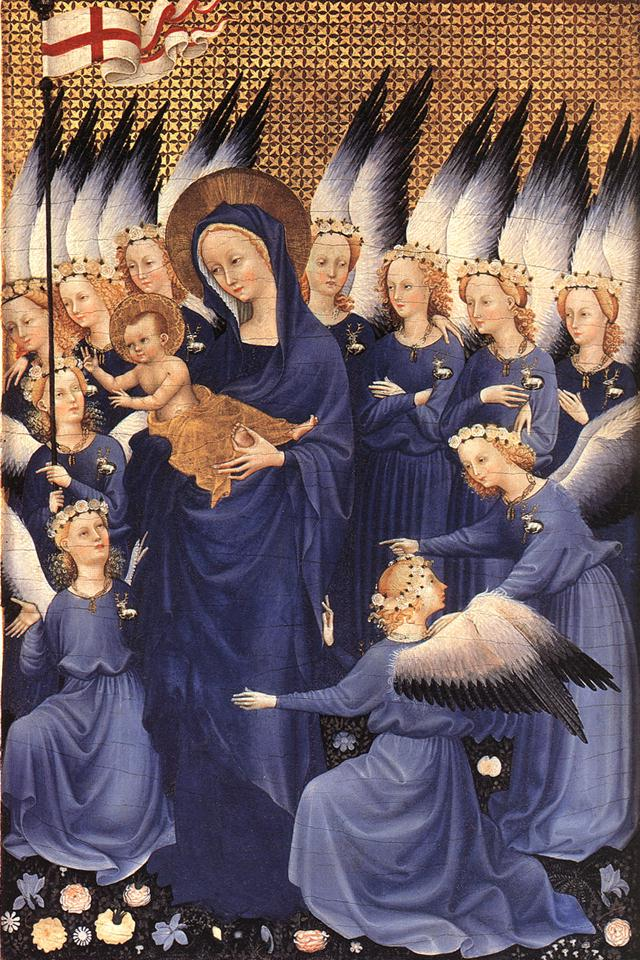
The Wilton Diptych (c. 1395–1399), tempera on wood, each section 57 cm × 29.2 cm (22.44 in × 11.50 in). National Gallery, London

Some of the most common subjects depicted in Catholic art:

- Category:Christian iconography

Life of Christ in art:

- Annunciation
- Nativity of Jesus in art
- Adoration of the Magi
- Adoration of the shepherds
- Baptism of Jesus
- The Last Supper
- Arrest of Jesus
- The Raising of the Cross
- The Crucifixion
- Descent from the Cross
- Noli me tangere
- Ascension of Jesus
- Christ in Majesty

Mary:

- Roman Catholic Marian art
- Life of the Virgin
- Christ taking leave of his Mother
- Death of the Virgin
- Assumption of the Virgin Mary in art
- Coronation of the Virgin
- The Holy Family
- Madonna (art)
- Madonna and Child
- Hortus conclusus
- Holy Kinship

Other:

- The Trinity in Art
- Angels in art
- Evangelist portrait
- Maestà
- Stations of the Cross
- Tree of Jesse

== See also ==
- Christian art
- Catholic culture
- List of Catholic artists
- Roman Catholic Marian art
- Early Renaissance painting
- Baroque architecture
- List of illuminated manuscripts
- Western Painting
