= Ende (artist) =

Spanish manuscript illuminator

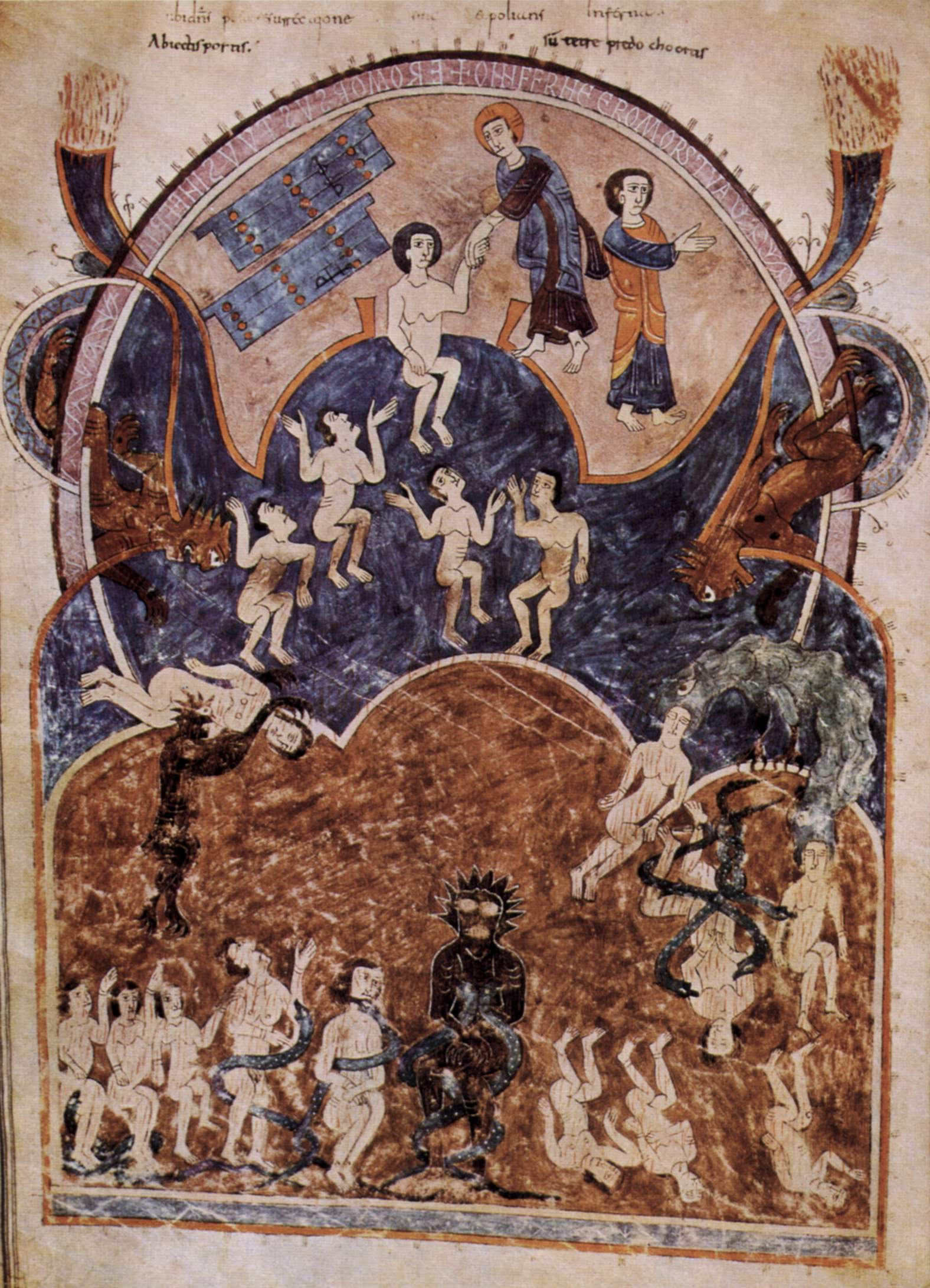
The Last Judgment, painted by Ende, from the Gerona Beatus

Ende (or En) is the first known Spanish female manuscript illuminator to have her work documented through inscription: ENDE PINTRIX ET D(E)I AIUTRIX in the colophon of the Gerona Beatus. Most information about her comes down to the inscription in her artwork as there was no other record. Her lifetime is not known but can be assumed based on the inscription era in the Gerona Beatus: AD 975. The appellation of “dei aiutrix” alludes to the fact that she was probably a nun however it has been found what her foundation was. There are a number of hands discernible in the manuscripts. The chief scribe was a priest called Senior. Historians have also attributed elements of the manuscripts to Emetrius, whose style is attributable in comparison to an earlier signed work. However, based on painting style attributes, some theorists conclude that nearly all of the manuscript illustrations were completed by Ende.

== Gerona Beatus ==
Ende worked on the 10th-century codex known as the Gerona Beatus, along with the monk Emeterius. The codex features the Commentary on the Apocalypse by the Spanish monk Beatus of Liébana, of which 26 illustrated copies are known to exist, paired with Jerome's commentary on the Book of Daniel. The Gerona Beatus was probably created at the monastery of Tabara in northwest Spain, being completed on July 6, 975.

The illuminations illustrate the Apocalyptic Vision of St. John the Divine in the Book of Revelation in the Mozarabic style. This style developed in Spain after the Muslim invasions, blending elements of Islamic art and decorative traditions, particularly the emphasis on geometry, rich colors, ornamented grounds, and stylized figures.

There is debate over whether Ende did most of the work, or if she was there to help Emeterius with what was considered “womanly” skills, such as decoration and delicate images. Emeterius is known to have worked on a previous version of Beatus' commentary known as the Tabara Beatus. However, comparisons between the illustration styles of the two codices show consistent differences that suggest Ende. Notably, Ende appears to have made frequent use of stratified backgrounds. This is the technique seen in art where the image is split into three areas. In Ende's case, she split the background into heaven, a horizon of the human world, and the ground level of the world. In addition, the colors in the Gerona Beatus are more intense than those in the Tabara Beatus, with significant use of yellow, dark blue, and orange.
