= Gerona Beatus =

10th-century illuminated manuscript

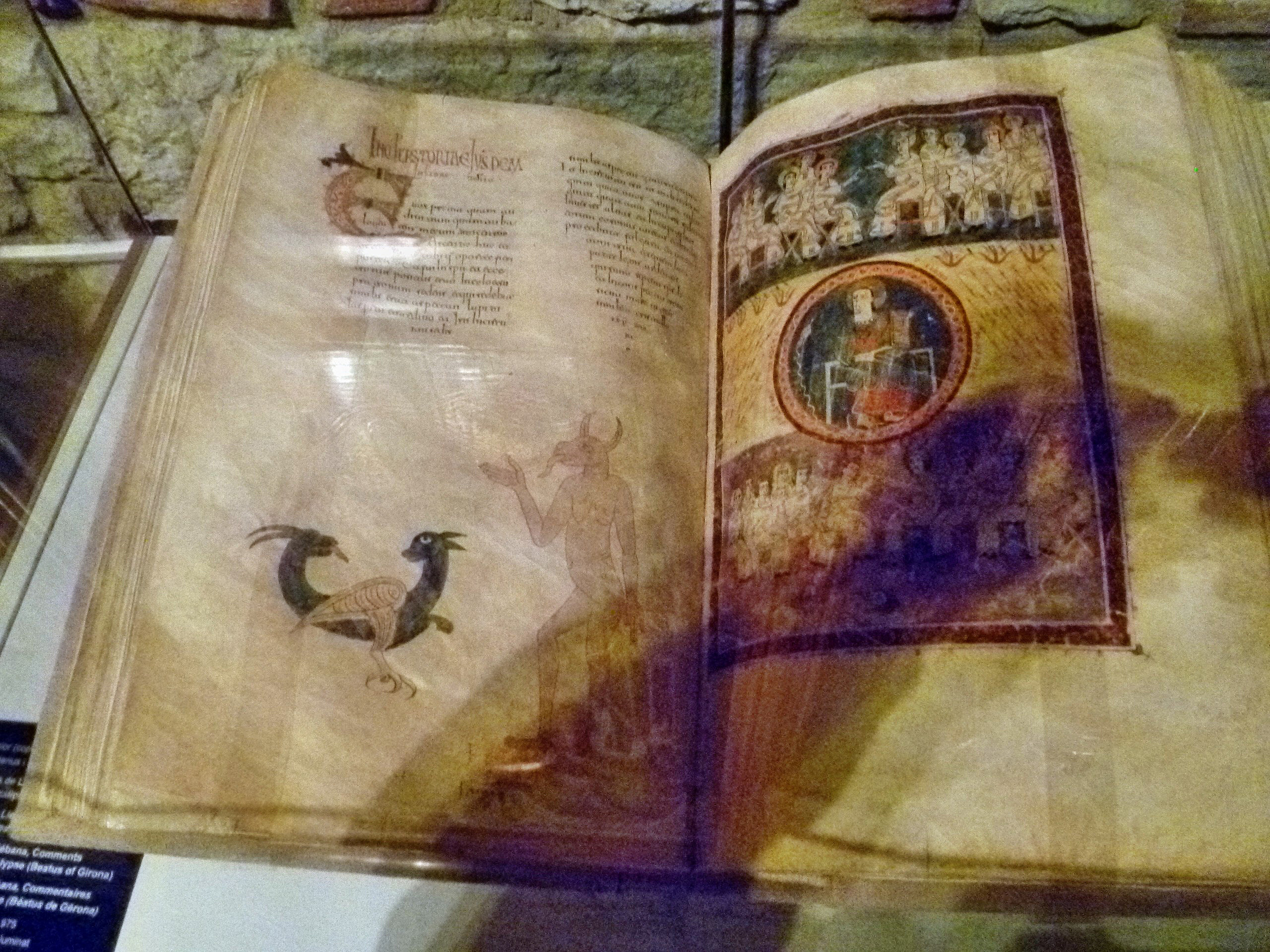
"Comments on the Apocalypse" by Beatus of Liébana; treasury of the Cathedral of Girona, Spain

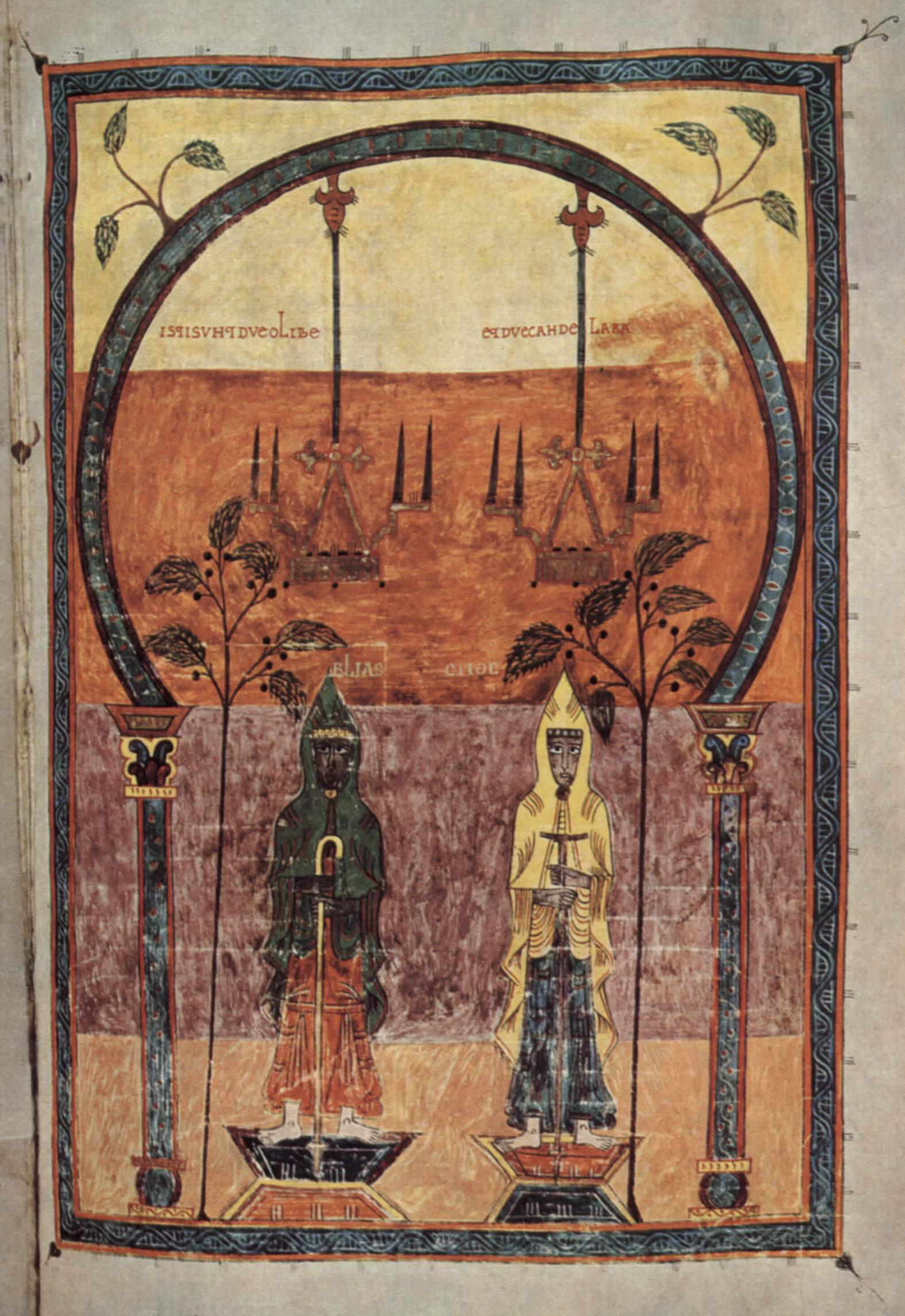
The two witnesses, Gerona Beatus (f. 164)

The Girona Beatus is a 10th-century illuminated manuscript in the museum of Girona Cathedral, Catalonia, Spain.

The manuscript contains two separate works: the Commentary on the Apocalypse by Beatus of Liébana, a late eighth-century work popular in medieval Spain (Note: So popular, that twenty-six illustrated copies have survived, dating from the late 9th to the early 13th centuries.) and Jerome's commentary on the Book of Daniel. (Note: Daniel is rich in eschatological prophecy, so the inclusion of Jerome’s commentary with Beatus’ work makes sense on a thematic basis.) It includes 284 extant folios, each measuring 400 mm by 260 mm, copiously illustrated with 184 surviving miniatures, and has been described as "one of the most richly decorated of the Beatus Commentaries, and one of the best documented."

== History ==
From inscriptions at the conclusion of the text, it is clear that the manuscript was commissioned by an Abbot Dominicus, and was completed on July 6, 975, most probably at the monastery at Tábara. (Note: Based largely on Emeterius signing his names as scribe and illuminator to another Beatus Commentary (Cod. 1097B at the National Historical Archives in Madrid), and stating that it was made at Tavara.) The scribe is identified as Presbyter Senior, and, unusually, the names of its two illuminators are included: Ende pintrix et dei aiutrix - 'Ende, woman painter and servant of God' and 'Emeterius, monk and presbyter'. (Note: The Latin used for "painter", (de)pintrix, is the feminine form. Per the medieval habit of citing names in descending order of importance, it has been concluded that the more important of the two illuminators was a woman, one of the few named female artists of the Middle Ages.)

== Style ==
The manuscript is described as containing:

... a heavily ornamental spirit, a strong tendency to the two-dimensional, a stylized approach to concrete reality which had an almost surreal air, and an unbroken luminous quality to the paint, all of them qualities we can find in a similar fashion in numerous other Mozarabic Beatus manuscripts too... certain details, such as the robes worn by a horseman or the bridle of a horse, still betray Islamic features.

Several of the manuscript's images indicate an extensive knowledge of Islamic iconography, despite the general style reflecting artistic developments in northern Europe. It has been suggested that this indicates the purpose of the original Commentaries was in opposition to Islamic rule, and a direct criticism of the Mozarabs.

== Symbolism ==
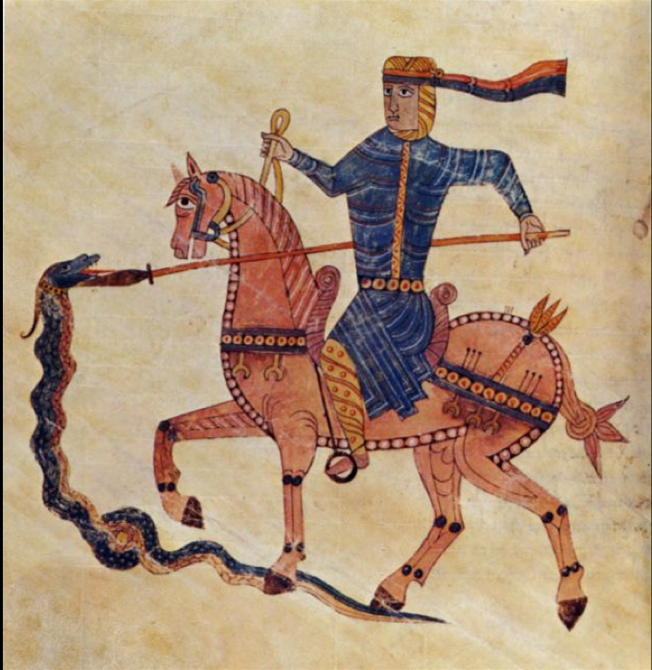
The Islamic rider, from the Gerona Beatus.

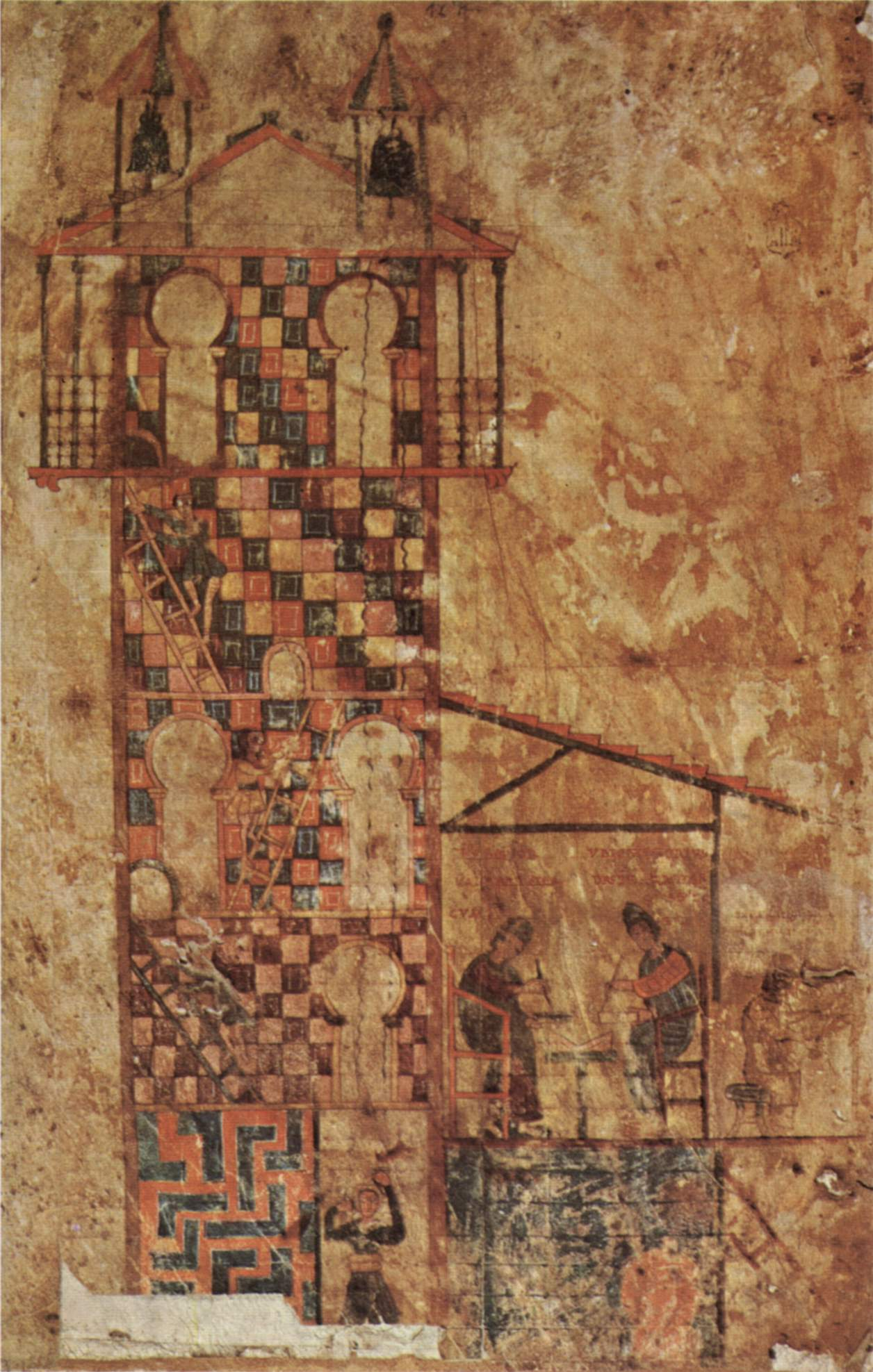
Illumination from the Girona Beatus. Scriptoria of monastery, including portraits of the miniaturists Emeterius and Ende.

The meaning of the symbols and iconography contained within the manuscript has been the subject of much debate.

Most interesting in this context is an image of a mounted figure, in Islamic dress, spearing a snake. The meaning of the rider is part of a larger debate, taking place since the early 1990s, over the purpose behind Beatus's compilations and their popularity throughout Christian Spain in the succeeding centuries.

=== Anti Islam interpretation ===
The image seems out of place, given that the snake is typically a symbol of Satan in Christian iconography. It can, however, also represent wisdom, (Note: As drawn from Jesus’ exhortation to his disciples to be "cunning as serpents," Matthew 10:16.) forcing the viewer to ask whether the mounted figure is a Mudejar, destroying the embodiment of Christian wisdom, or a Mozarab, destroying evil: which points to a rather complex and ambivalent view of Mozarabs at the time. To further complicate interpretation, the idea of the Christian as a "cunning serpent" was prominent in the Cordovan martyrs’ movement. (Note: Werckmeister, p.103-105)

=== Political interpretation ===
The manuscript can be regarded as an incitement of Christian resistance to Muslim rule in the south; the Christian eschatology predicting the fall of the godless kingdoms and the restoration of captive Israel resounded strongly with the Asturians, who by the time of Beatus had only recently gained enough strength to take a stand against Al-Andalus and claim the old Visigothic kingdom as their heritage.

In the image of the rider and snake, the snake appears to be unharmed, indicating the rider to be unambiguously Islamic, and the image is an exhortation to Christians in Al-Andalus not to fear martyrdom. (Note: Werckmeister, p.103-105.)

In that context [of the Christian stand-off with Islam], his commentary on the apocalyptic visions of John the Divine took on the nature of a political book, since its contents... could be applied directly to the contemporary struggles against those who were perceived as the heathen. The richly illustrated codices... thus articulated an ideology which was at once nationalist and theological.

However, all of Beatus's sources were composed prior to the rise of Islam in Spain, and, while it may have been possible for a reader to interpret the events of the Apocalypse in reference to Islam, there is a marked absence of contemporaneous anti-Islamic rhetoric. (Note: Klein p. 228.) Indeed, ... simple proximity to Islam by no means guaranteed Christian attention to it. In the case of Spain, the earliest attempts to comprehend Islam date from almost a century after the conquest, well after the manuscript's production.

=== Anti-adoptionism ===
Beatus is famous for his support of Asturian opposition to the doctrine of Adoptionism, proclaimed by the bishop of Toledo and declared by Asturias as heresy, and it has been suggested that the manuscript reflects his orthodox stance against the doctrine. To the Asturians, Adoptionism was a form of compromise with the Islamic invaders and Beatus, who later composed a tract attacking Adoptionism directly, may be believed to express some of the same thought in his Commentaries. (Note: Schapiro p. 328.)

The first edition compilation was completed prior to the Adoptionist controversy, and it is therefore unlikely that Beatus intended the manuscript to stand as an indictment of the doctrine.

=== Millenniary fears ===
Beatus's own chronological computations placed the end of the sixth age of the world, and the start of the events of the Apocalypse, in the year 800. It seems likely that the possible approaching end of the world was the impetus behind the production of the manuscript. (Note: Klein pp. 223–224.) Klein quotes Maius, the artist of the Morgan Beatus, who had written in the colophon that he painted the pictures so the learned may fear the coming of the future judgement and of the world’s end. For Klein, this is a fairly strong proof of millennialist anxieties.
