= Efren Ordoñez =

Efren Ordoñez (August 20, 1927 – August 21, 2011) was a Mexican artist who created paintings, sculptures and stained glass. His work often focused on religious themes and he has been called 'the painter of the divine'.

== Early life and career ==
Efren Ordoñez was born in the city of Chihuahua, but moved to Monterrey at the age of two and retained close links with that city for the rest of his life. After attending Monterrey Institute of Technology and Higher Education, he joined the School of Law and Social Sciences at the Autonomous University of Nuevo Leon, but switched to architecture.

In 1952, he set up his first art studio, also holding his first exhibition for the Third National Missionary Congress. Three years later, he mounted another exhibition of paintings in Arte AC design school, Monterrey. He was also commissioned to create prints, sculptures, murals and stained glass for the Archdiocese of Monterrey in 1955, and this earned him recognition as an artist who could translate religious themes through art.

== Later career ==
Efren Ordoñez's work was exhibited in Mexico and also the United States, including exhibitions at the Dreyer Gallery in Houston and the Palacio de Bellas Artes, Mexico City.

A retrospective of his work was held in 1976 in Monterrey. Ordoñez was awarded the "Presea Estado" (Civic Merit Award) for his art by the government of Nuevo León in 1988. In 2000, his work was included in '100 Years performed by 100 Artists, Visual Arts in Nuevo Leon'.

== Notable works ==
His portfolio includes more than 60 public, secular and religious artworks. Among the most iconic are his stained glass windows.

== External sources ==
- Examples of Ordoñez's stained glass
- Biography (in Spanish)
- Interview with the artist (in Spanish)
