= Morgan Beatus =

10th-century illuminated manuscript

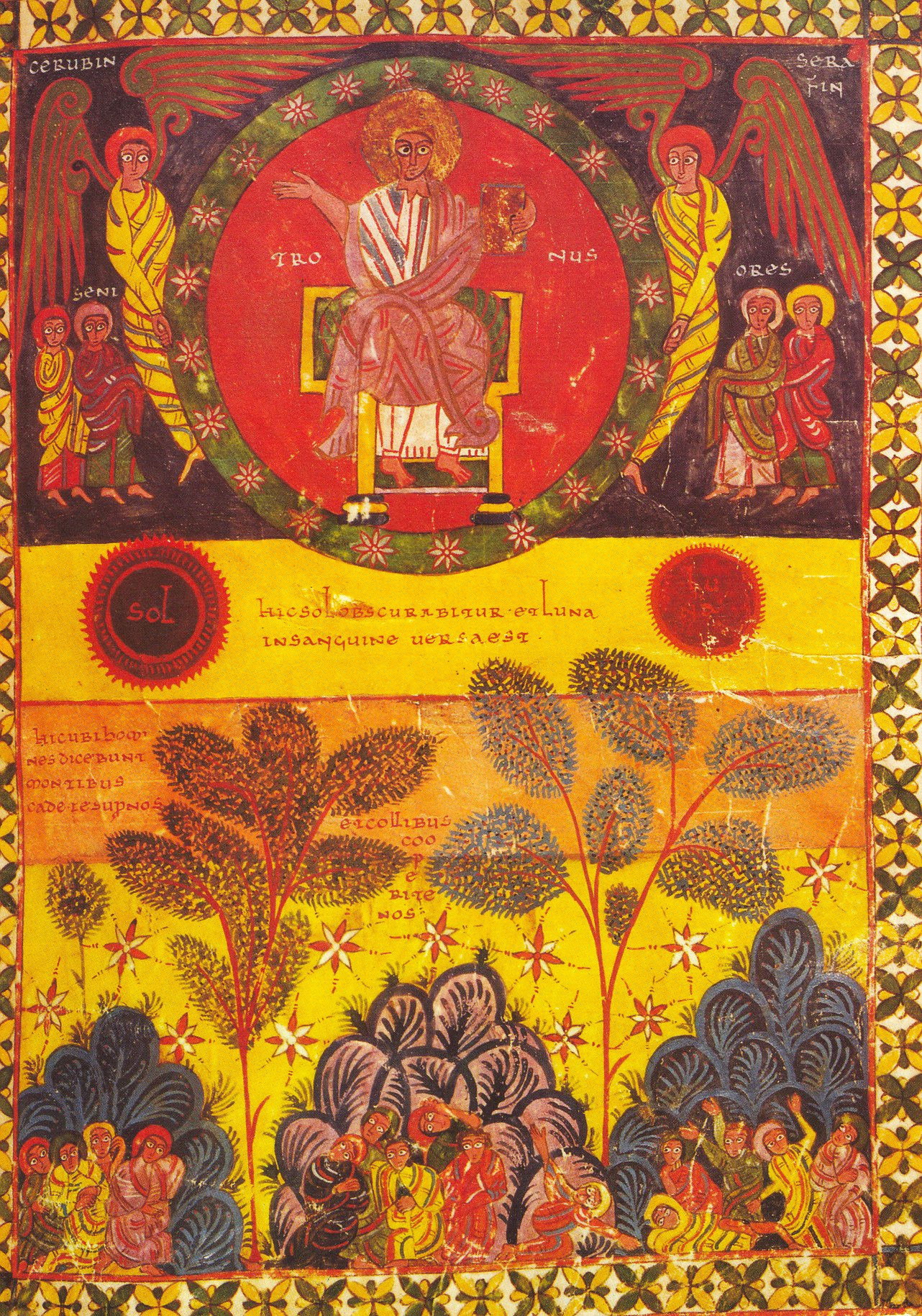
Morgan Beatus, f. 112: The opening of the Sixth Seal: "And I beheld when he had opened the sixth seal, and, lo, there was a great earthquake; and the sun became black as sackcloth of hair, and the moon became as blood" (Revelation, 6.12)

The Morgan Beatus (New York, Morgan Library & Museum, MS 644) is an illuminated manuscript with miniatures by the artist Magius (or Maius) of the Commentary on the Book of the Apocalypse by the eighth-century Spanish monk Beatus, which described the end of days and the Last Judgment. The manuscript is believed to have been produced in and around the scriptorium of the Monastery of San Miguel de Escalada in Spain.

Having been created at some time in the 10th century, the Morgan Beatus is one of the oldest examples of a revived Spanish apocalypse tradition, and one of the earliest works of so-called Mozarabic art. The Apocalypse and the commentary on this scripture by Saint Beatus of Liébana became one of the most important religious texts of the Middle Ages, and was often illustrated very fully.

== Contents ==
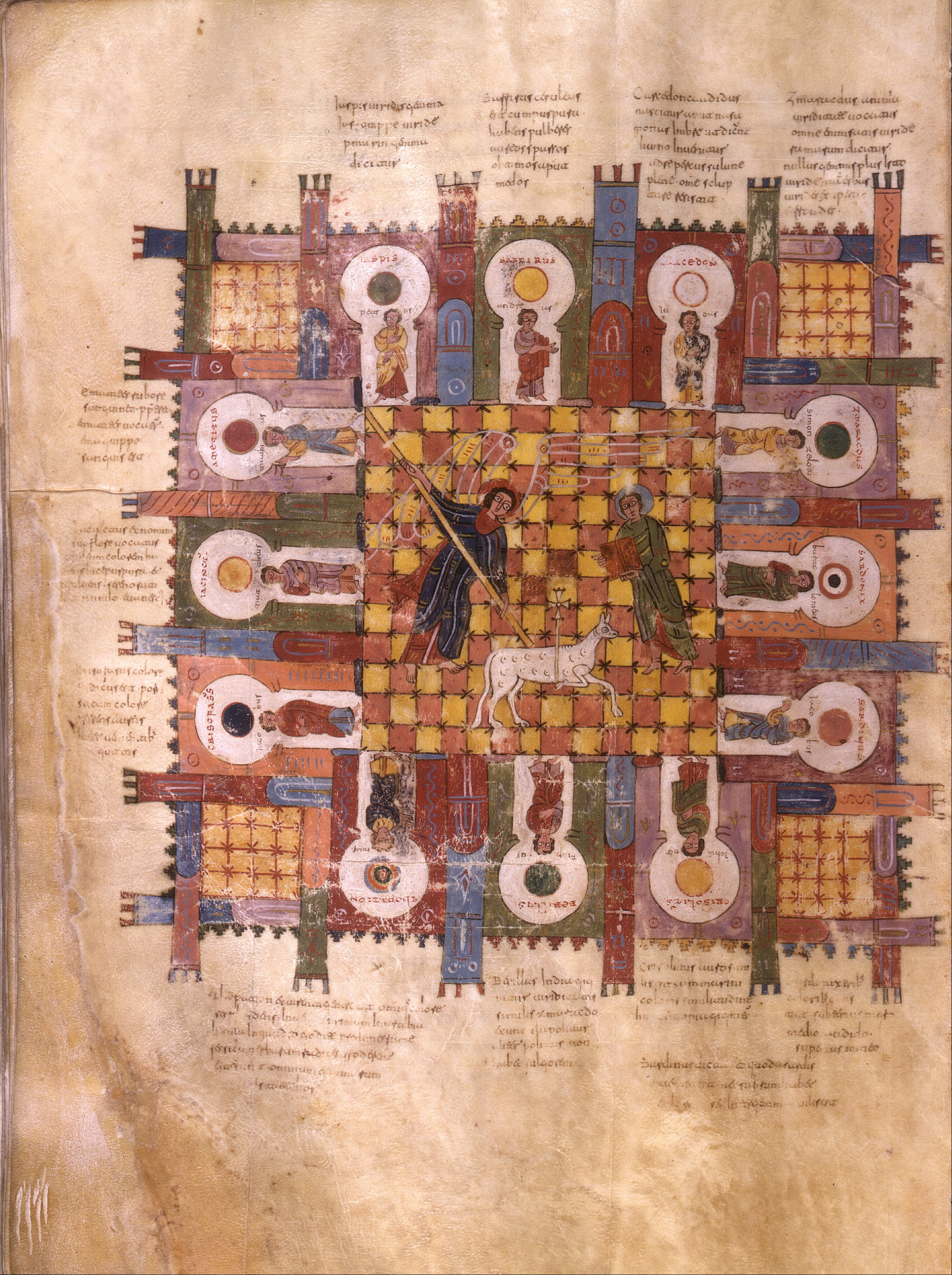
The Angel Measuring the New Jerusalem

The Morgan Beatus contains preliminary material with brilliantly painted Evangelist portraits (ff. 1–9), Beatus's Commentary on the Apocalypse, (ff. 10-233), excerpts from Isidore of Seville's De ad finitatibus et gradibus and of his Etymologies (ff. 234r-237r), St. Jerome's Commentary on Daniel, (ff. 239–293), and a third exposition of the Apocalypse (ff. 294–299). This last is a synopsis of a variety of sources and, apparently, a later addition. Its current dimensions are 387mm x 285mm (15 3/32 x 11 1/8 inches). Early folios indicate the removal of the original gold and redrawing of letters by Magius, the creator of the manuscript, and his assistants.

The 300 leaves of the manuscript are of fine-quality parchment, thick and uniform in color. Margins are wide, script and illuminations, generally well preserved. Several folios are damaged by dampness or fire. The colors are remarkably well preserved and vibrant. Magius is identified as the work's maker by means of a colophon on f. 293 and a memento on f. 233. The colophon also provides a cryptic date and references to the commissioning abbot and the monastery of St Michael.

The collation of the original quires is difficult to determine due to the loss of some leaves. In the course of combining bifolios into quires, the medieval bookmakers needed a system by which they could keep the various quires in their proper order. Catchwords eventually became the standard tool for this purpose. The Morgan Beatus, however, does not utilize this technique. Instead, this manuscript makes use of signatures consisting of Roman numerals followed by the letter "Q" There are two miniature bearing folios signed in this fashion. Intact quires consist of eight leaves (four bifolios). Most signatures are in the corner of the lower margin of the final verso. The fact that these signatures are Roman numerals, and not Arabic, suggests against the bookmakers being local or Mozarab vocations to the monastery scriptorium. At the same time it is seen as evidence dating the manuscript to the first half of the tenth century. The opening folios (ff. 1–9) seem to be a later addition, not only because they lack these signatures, but because they are composed of two sets of three bifolios.

== Woman clothed with the sun escaping from the dragon ==
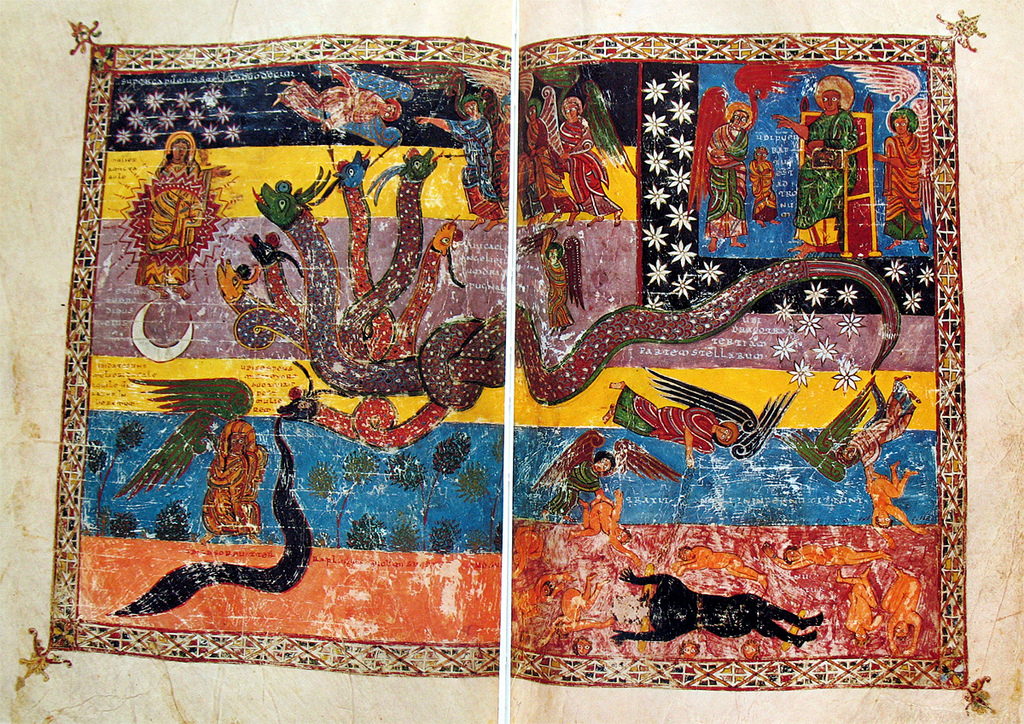
The Morgan Beatus, Woman clothed with the sun escaping from the dragon.

The Woman clothed with the sun escaping from the dragon exemplifies the artistic collaboration between the two religions. Biblically, this piece depicts scenes from Revelation 12, in which the woman represents the Virgin Mary escaping from the seven headed dragon, which is represented by the devil or Satan. The intertwined dragons, colored with red and purple ink, reference Islamic art with the perturbing red tongues and bulging eyes of the animals. These characteristics produce the distinctive blend of Christian and Muslim art, which is now categorized as Mozarabic art (a term deriving from the Arabic must’arib). With this newfound artistic style, Maius aimed to reflect biblical references through the inclusion of the angels falling from heaven fighting the dragon alongside the archangel Michael, and the crown of 12 stars above the woman’s head, referencing the imagery often associated with the Virgin Mary and the Christ child.

This piece, along with many others, serves as commentary on the apocalypse which was later defined under the term Adoptionism; the view in which Jesus was born a human child and then adopted by God as His son. This view point, spearheaded by the Christian church in Spain, was then challenged by monk Beatus of Liebana. To counter the growing Islamic powers and Christian doctrine under Moorish rule, the monk counteracted the teachings of adoptionist heresy (a belief contrary to established doctrine) and Islam, which was then further challenged by Maius’ artistic depictions throughout this manuscript. The effect of Maius’ work continues Islamic artistic and architectural stylings, and includes commentary on the power struggles between Christianity and Islam in and around the 10th century. Maius’ contributions in Woman clothed with the sun escaping from the dragon also exemplifies how he furthered the artistic abilities in Christian art. Through the use of stylized Mozarabic elements such as vibrant color palettes in the background, to the abstract depictions of humans, animals, and patterned borders, Maius offered and attesting bridge between the Christian and Islamic communities even during a time of serious power struggles.

== Gallery ==
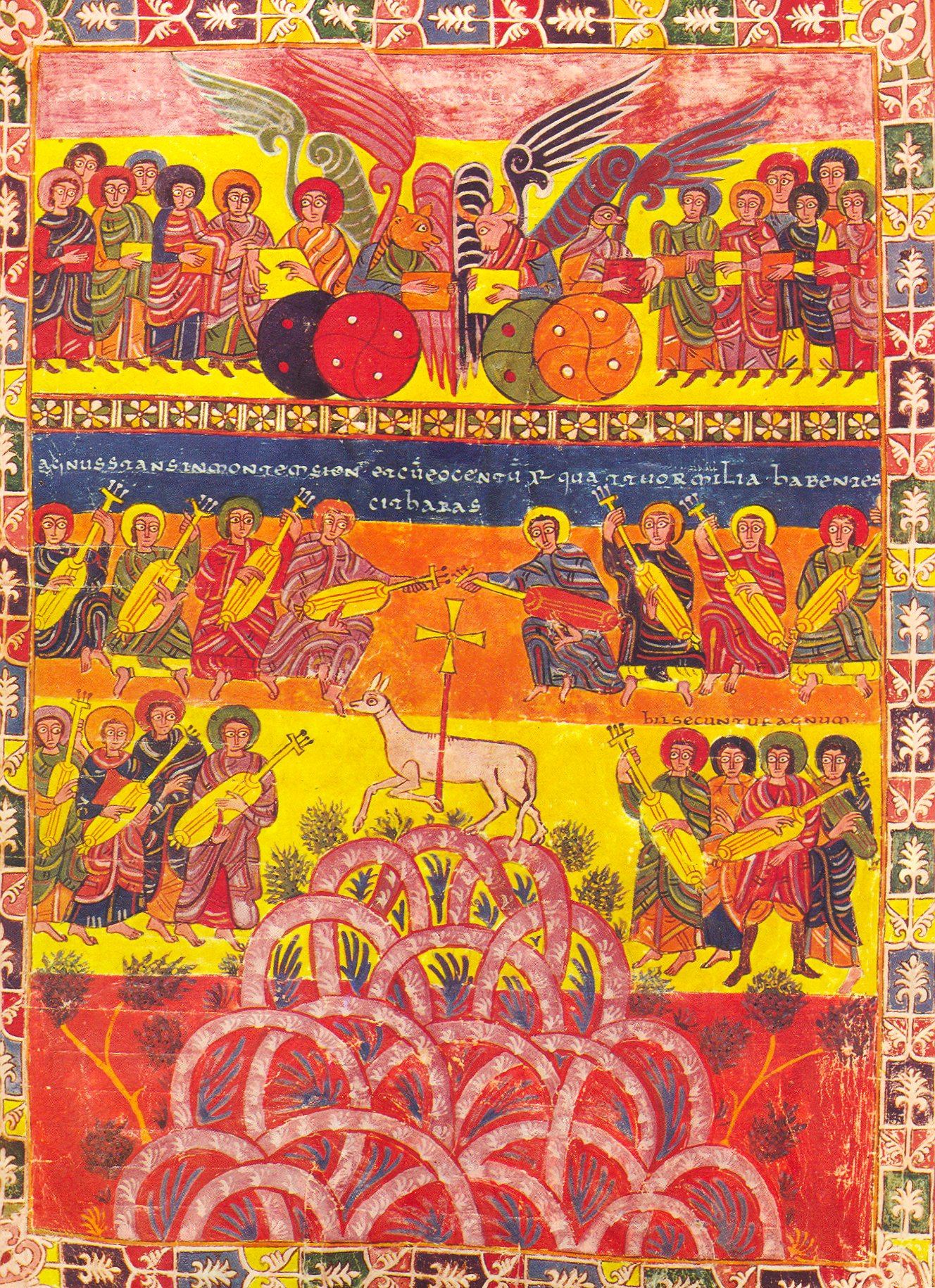
The Lamb on Mount Zion

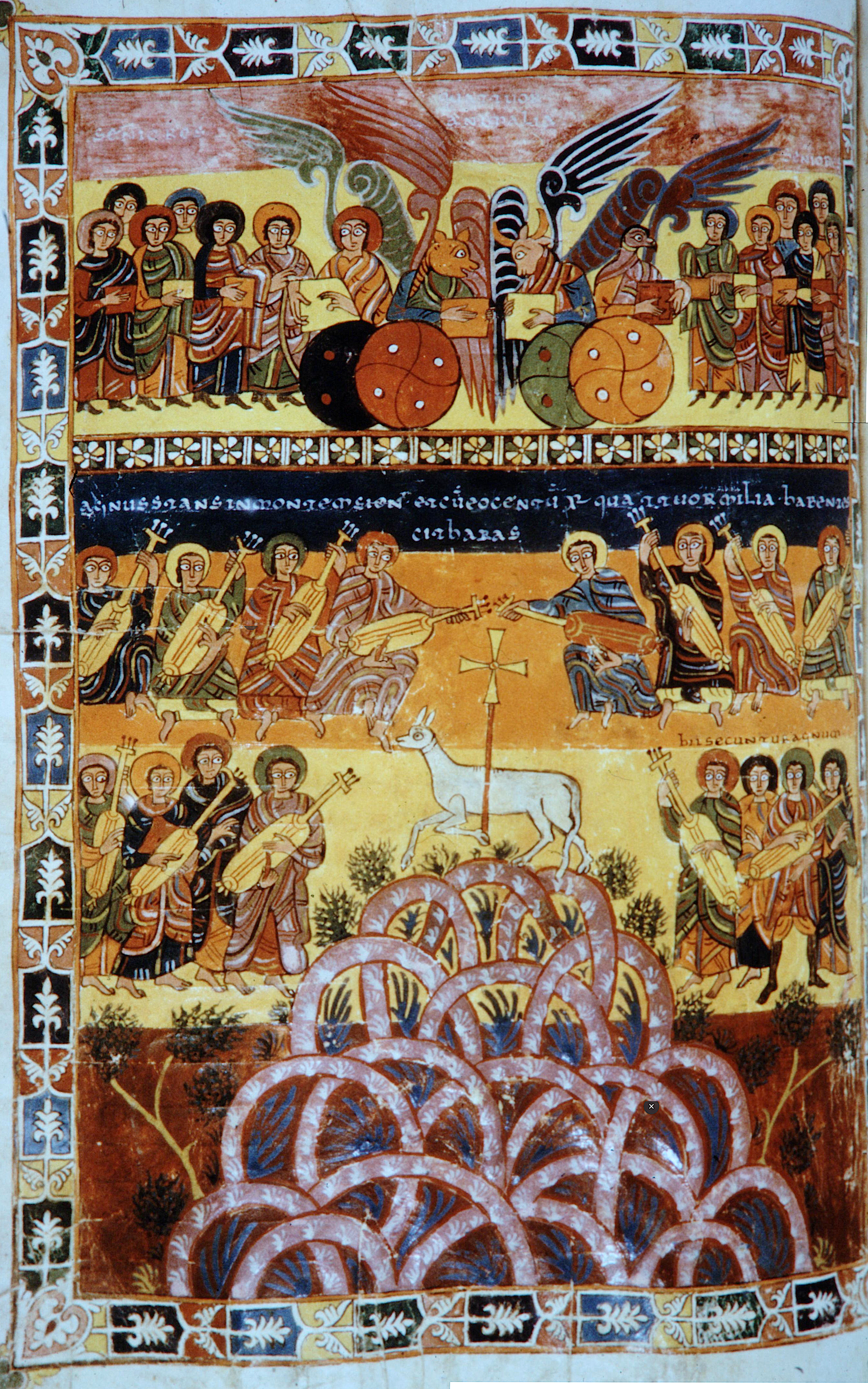
The Lamb on Mount Zion, scan of original

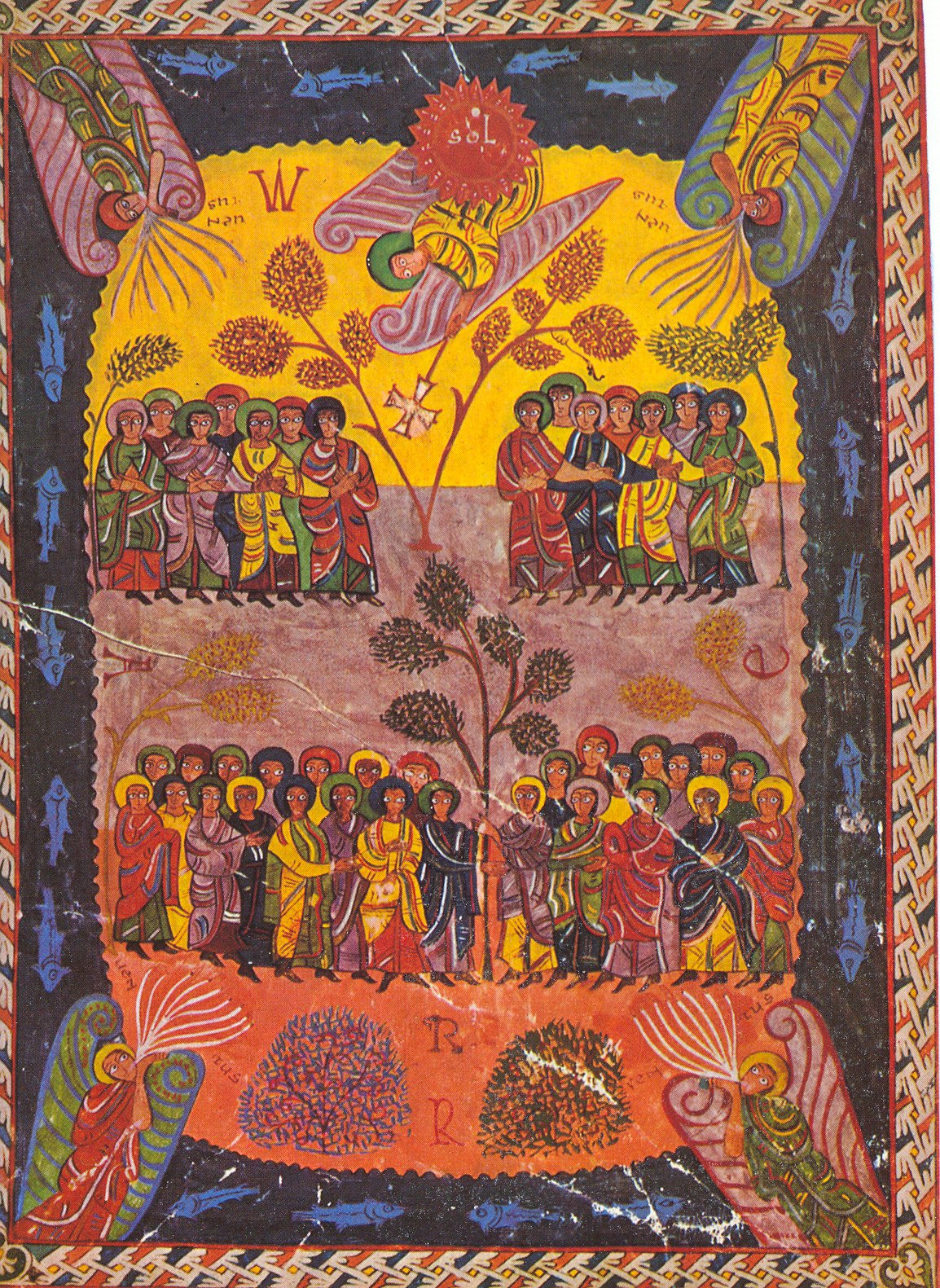
The Angel, the Sun and the Four Winds

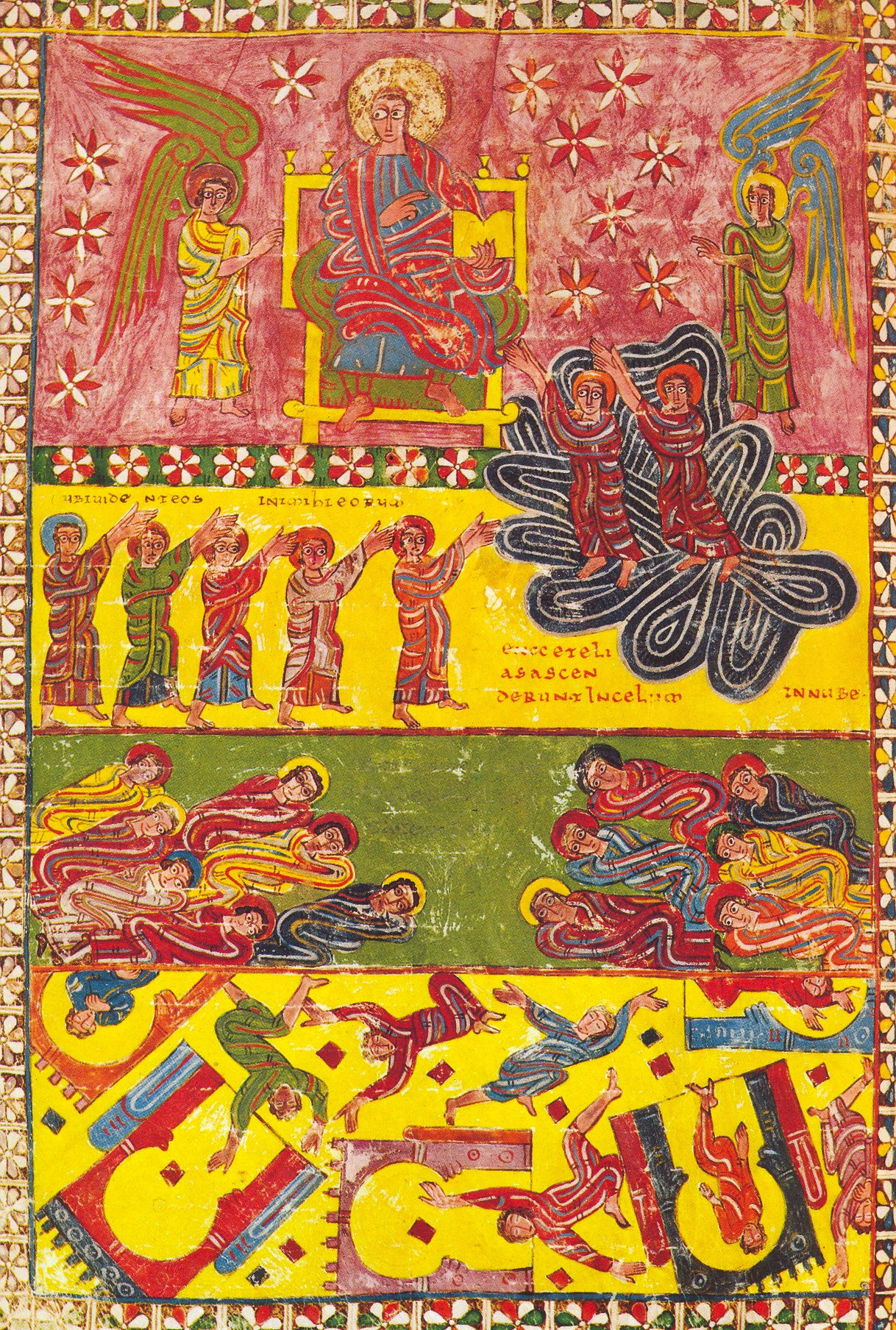
The Ascension of the Two Witnesses

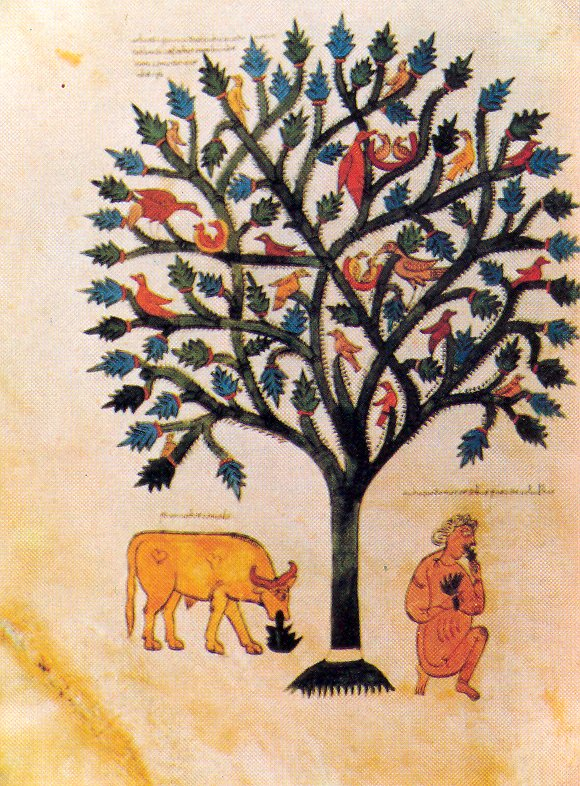
