= Illuminated Beatus manuscripts =

There are 29 known illuminated Beatus manuscripts. These are illuminated manuscripts containing a copy of the Commentary on the Book of Revelation written in Latin around 776 in Spain by Beatus of Liébana.

- Arroyo Beatus
- Berlin Beatus
- Cardeña Beatus
- Corsini Beatus
- Escorial Beatus
- Facundus Beatus
- Fanlo Beatus
- Geneva Beatus
- Gerona Beatus
- Las Huelgas Beatus
- León fragment
- Lorvão Beatus
- Milan fragment
- Morgan Beatus
- Navarre Beatus
- Osma Beatus
- Rioseco fragment
- Rylands Beatus
- Saint-Sever Beatus
- San Millán Beatus
- San Pedro de León fragment
- Silos Beatus
- Silos fragment
- Tábara Beatus
- Turin Beatus
- Urgell Beatus
- Valcavado Beatus
- Vitrina 14-1 Beatus
- Vitrina 14-2 fragment

== Bibliography ==
- Williams, John (2017). Martin, Therese (ed.). Visions of the End in Medieval Spain: Catalogue of Illustrated Beatus Commentaries on the Apocalypse and Study of the Geneva Beatus. Amsterdam University Press.
