= Tábara Beatus =

10th-century illuminated manuscript

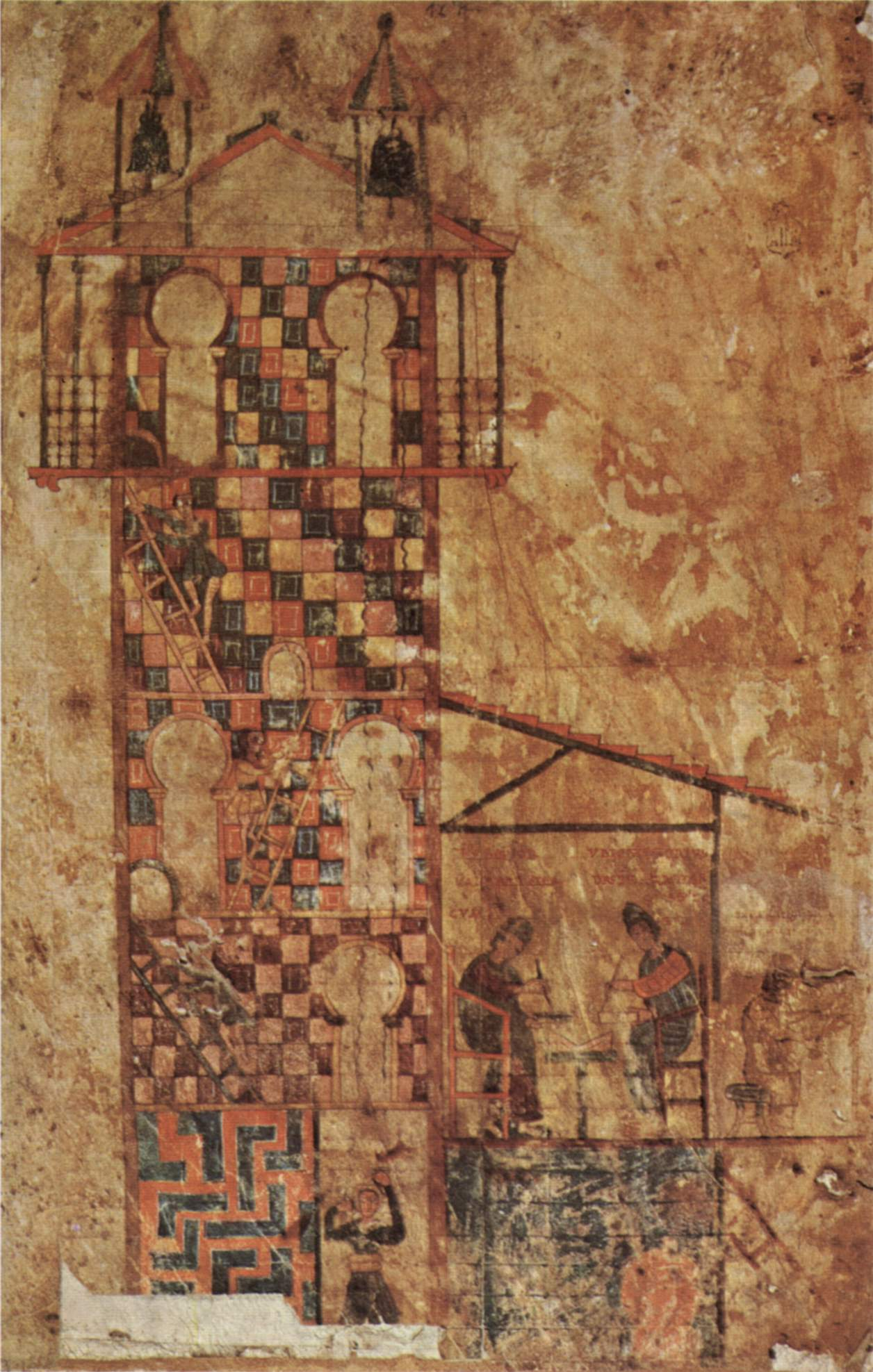
Miniature of the scriptorium tower (verso, folio 171), showing two of the named copyists and illuminators with an assistant.

The Tábara Beatus or Beatus of Tábara is a 10th-century illuminated manuscript, containing the Commentary on the Apocalypse by Beatus of Liébana. It originated in the San Salvador de Tábara Monastery and is now held in Spain's National Historical Archive in Madrid under the catalogue number L.1097B. Only eight of its original hundred miniatures survive.

== History ==
A colophon on folio 167 of the manuscript states it was completed by a scribe called Emeterius on 29 July 970 in the scriptorium of the San Salvador Monastery in Tábara. Its copyist was a monk called Monnius and its illumination was by one Magius, who could be the same man as Maius, who illuminated the Morgan Beatus but died halfway through producing the Tábara Beatus. It was copied from an unknown 10th century manuscript from the province of Leon.

When it was restored a hypothesis arose that the present manuscript is the result of binding one two-folio work with two folios from another Beatus manuscript, with that other manuscript forming folios 167 and 168 of the work as it stands today, which have been cut, possibly to make larger folios fit into the new codex. This hypothesis is not universally accepted and John Williams argue that all the work's folios belong to the same manuscript.

One of the manuscript's later owners was Ramón Alvarez de la Braña, a librarian in Leon, from which it entered the collection of the School of Diplomacy in Madrid and then its present home.

== Description ==
Its text is written in two columns in Visigothic minuscule. Glosses in Arabic are noted in the margins, showing that the monastery which produced and used it contained Mozarabic monks. It also contains large decorative capitals. It belongs to the same group of Beatus manuscripts as the Gerona Beatus and Morgan Beatus and originated in the same scriptorium.

== Bibliography ==
- John W. Williams, "The illustrated Beatus. A corpus of the illustrations of the commentary on the Apocalypse", volume II, The 9th and 10th centuries, Harvey Miller Publisher, 1994, 319 pages, p. 43-49
- (in French) John Williams, Manuscrits espagnols du Haut Moyen Âge, Chêne, 1977, 119 p. (ISBN 2851081470)
