= San Millán Beatus =

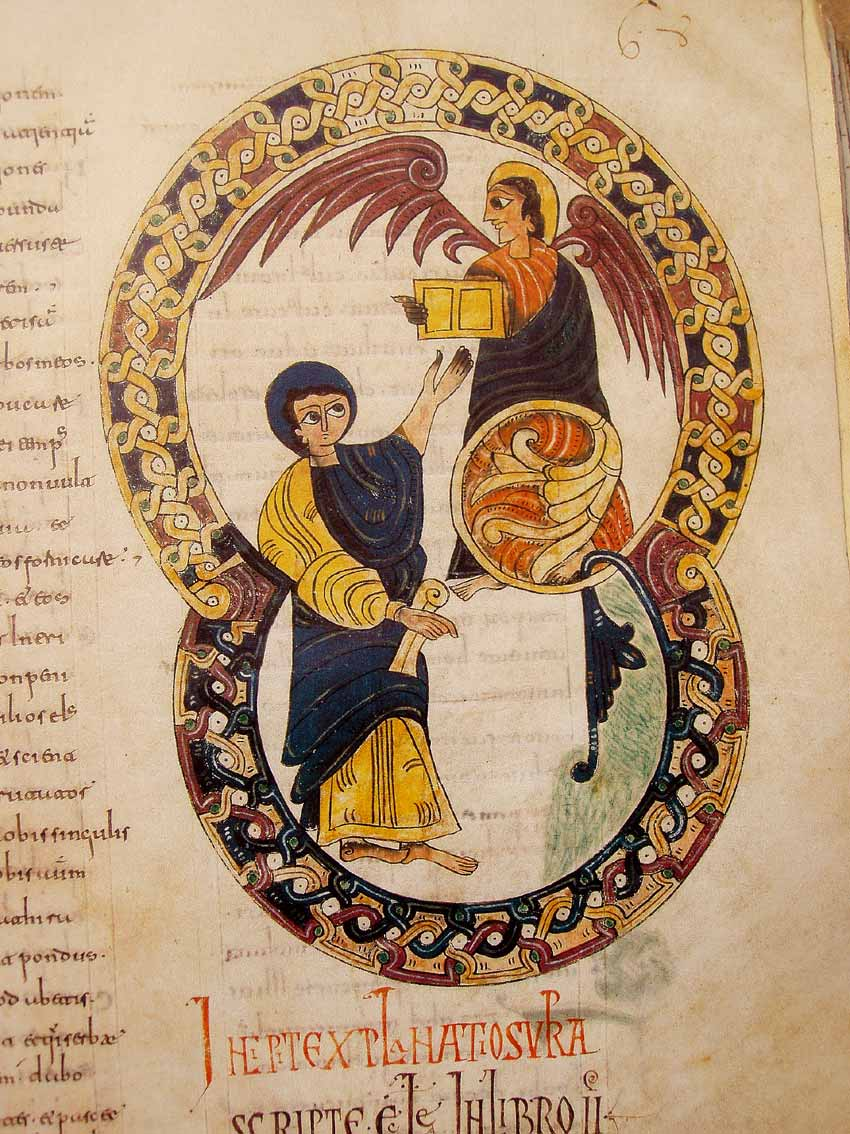
Saint John and the Angel of Thyatira, recto of folio 68

The San Millán Beatus is an illuminated manuscript now held in the Royal Academy of History in Madrid as Cod. Emil. 33. It measures 35.5 cm by 23 cm and is a copy of the Commentary on the Apocalypse by Beatus of Liébana. Its illuminations are incomplete, but its text is one of the most complete surviving copies of the commentary. As well as Beatus' commentary, it contains saint Jerome's prologue on the Apocalypse and commentary on the Book of Daniel and extracts from Isidore of Seville's Etymologiae. It is made up of 282 bound folios - there are 48 miniatures on the first 228 pages and 1 miniature on the remaining 54 pages.

It was produced in two phases. The first seems to have been in the Province of Leon at the end of the 10th century - this created the core of the text and most of the miniatures. The second phase occurred at the Monastery of San Millán de la Cogolla in La Rioja, probably at the end of the 11th century - this added colour to the existing miniatures and produced one new miniature. John Williams argues that the second phase miniatures show influences from the Romanesque style and 12th-century French illumination and so date to the start of the first quarter of the 12th century.
