= Commentary on the Apocalypse =

Book by Beatus of Liébana

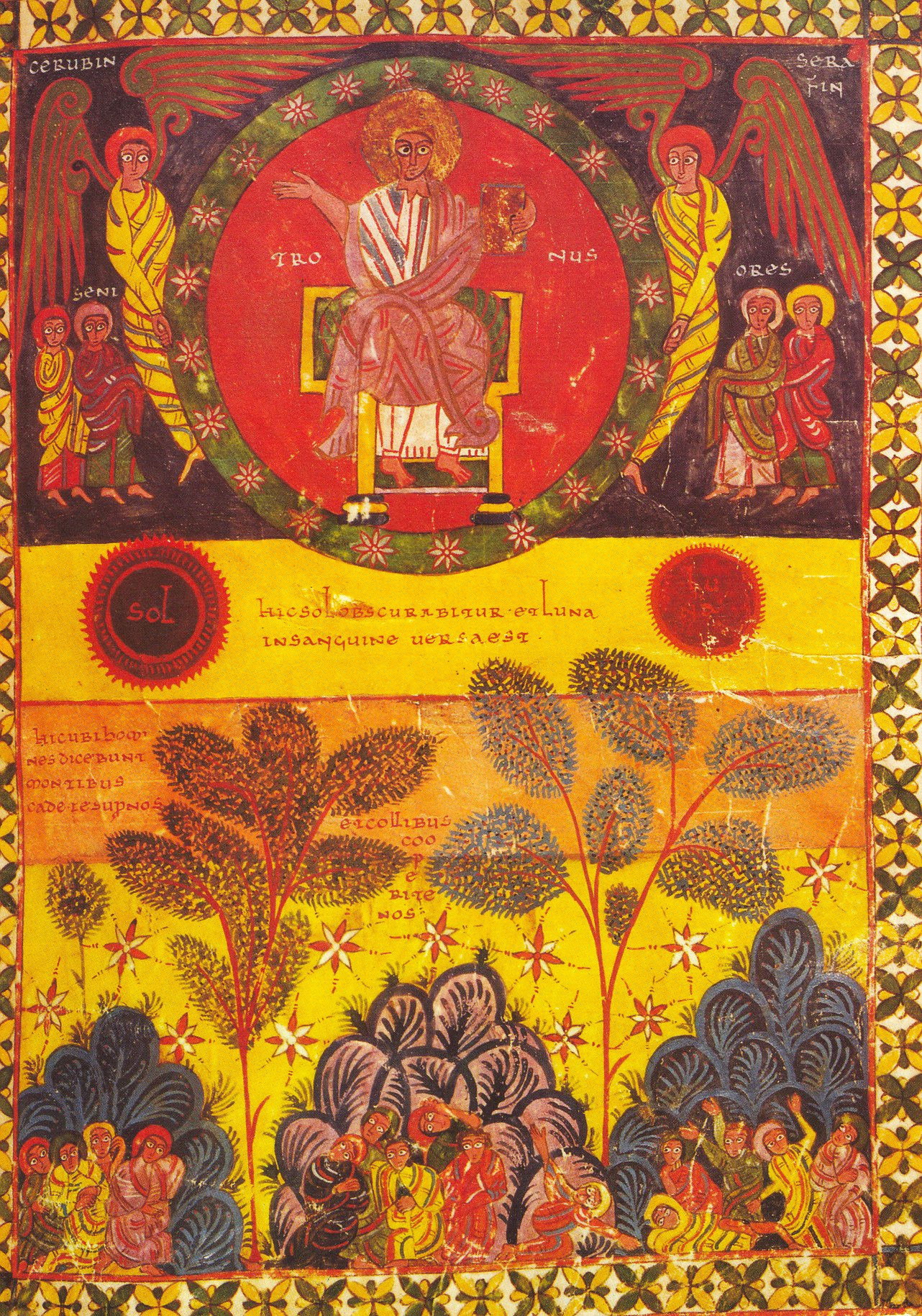
Morgan Beatus, f. 112: The opening of the Sixth Seal: "And I beheld when he had opened the sixth seal, and, lo, there was a great earthquake; and the sun became black as sackcloth of hair, and the moon became as blood" (Revelation, 6.12)

The Commentary on the Apocalypse (Commentaria in Apocalypsin) is a Latin commentary on the biblical Book of Revelation written around 776 by the Spanish monk and theologian Beatus of Liébana (c. 730–after 785). The surviving texts differ somewhat, and the work is mainly famous for the spectacular illustrations in a group of illustrated manuscripts, mostly produced on the Iberian Peninsula over the following five centuries. There are 29 surviving illustrated manuscripts (many incomplete or fragments) dating from the 9th to the 13th centuries, as well as other unillustrated and later manuscripts. Significant copies include the Morgan, Saint-Sever, Gerona, Osma, Madrid (Vitr 14-1), and Tábara Beatus codices.

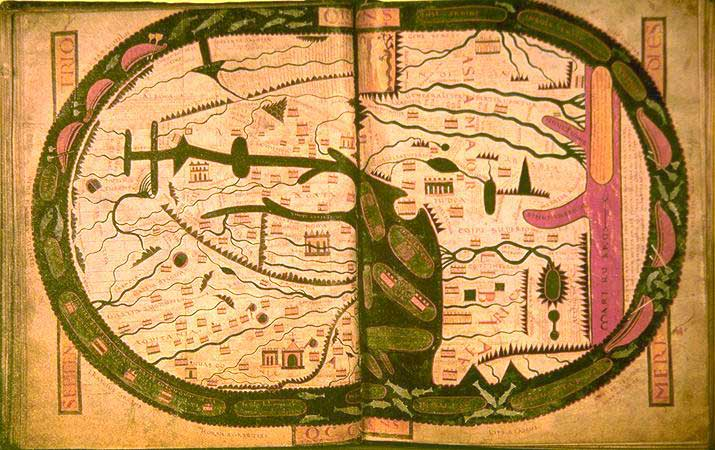
The "Beatus map" from the Saint-Sever Beatus measuring 37 X 57 cm. Saint-Sever Abbey, Aquitaine, c. 1050

Most unusually for a theological work, the imagery seems to have been included from the start, and is considered to be the work of Beatus himself, although the earliest surviving manuscripts date from about a century after he wrote the book. After about another century, around 950, the size and number of illustrations was expanded. Manuscripts of the work are typically referred to just as a Beatus. They included a Beatus map, a version of the medieval type of world map called the T and O map with added details; this is supposed to have been created by Beatus. It has only survived in some copies.

Considered together, the Beatus codices are among the most important Spanish manuscripts and have been the subject of extensive scholarly and antiquarian enquiry. The illuminated versions now represent the best known works of Mozarabic art, and had some influence on the medieval art of the rest of Europe. Among modern painters, Pablo Picasso's painting Guernica was inspired by the Saint-Sever Beatus. The Morgan Beatus (in New York City's Morgan Library) inspired the artist Fernand Léger.,

The text was not printed until 1770, and later translated into Spanish for a side-by-side edition, but despite modern Latin critical editions, it has had little influence on biblical studies after the Middle Ages.

== The text ==
We know very little about Beatus' life. The leading expert John Williams writes: "We even lack proof of his responsibility for the Commentary on the Apocalypse. Nowhere does it carry his name..." The work as it has come down to us in the Beatus manuscripts consists of several prologues (which differ among the manuscripts) and one long summary section (the "Summa Dicendum") before the first book, an introduction to the second book, and 12 books of commentary, some long and some very short. Beatus states in its dedication to his friend Bishop Etherius that states the work is meant to educate his brother monks. This dedication is the best evidence of Beatus as the author.

Beatus divided the biblical text into 68 sections or storiae, of around a dozen verses. The Vulgate text was written out, then followed by an illustration, after which came his commentary on the section. It is now generally agreed that the illustrations were included from Beatus's original version(s) onwards, although only later manuscripts have survived. This includes the map, though it is an exception, as it illustrates no biblical passage.

The text was evidently read aloud in monastic refectories during meal times; it was usual for various texts to be treated in this way.

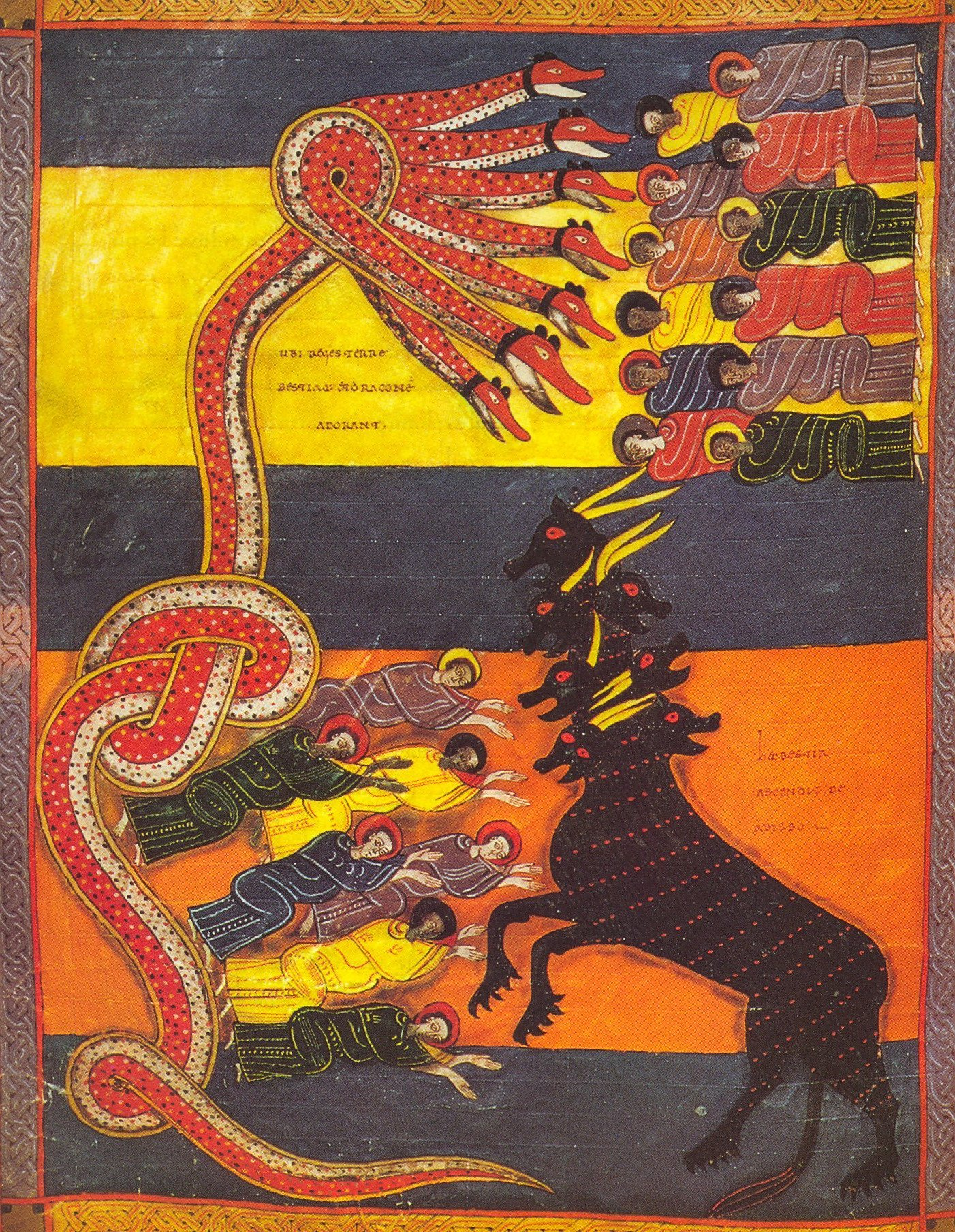
Facundus Beatus, f. 191v: The Dragon gives his power to the Beast

The commentaries are built around selections from previous Apocalypse commentaries and references by Ticonius (now mostly lost), St. Primasius of Hadrumetum, St. Caesarius of Arles, St. Apringius of Beja, and many others. There are also long extracts from the texts of the Church Fathers and Doctors of the Church, especially Augustine of Hippo, Ambrose of Milan, Irenaeus of Lyons, Pope Gregory I, Saint Jerome of Stridon, and Isidore of Seville. From the later 10th century onwards, one "line" of manuscripts adds Jerome's Commentary on the Book of Daniel, and a large genealogy of Christ, both illustrated (see below), and sometimes also a commentary on the books of Ezekiel, but these are not strictly part of the Beatus.

The creative character of the commentary comes from Beatus' writing of a wide-ranging catena of verses from nearly every book of the Bible, quotes of patristic commentary from many little known sources, and interstitial original comments by Beatus. His attitude is one of realism about church politics and human pettiness, hope and love towards everyday life even when it is difficult, and many homely similes from his own time and place. (For example, he compares evangelization to lighting fires for survival when caught far from home by a sudden mountain blizzard, and the Church to a Visigothic army with both generals and muleskinners.) His work is also a fruitful source for Spanish linguistics, as Beatus often alters words in his African Latin sources to the preferred synonyms in Hispanic Latin.

== Illustrations ==
Illustrations are believed to have been included in the earliest manuscripts of the work, now lost. Williams cautions against talking of a consistent style in the manuscripts; though the subjects and often compositions remain much the same, the artistic style tends to follow wider developments across southern Europe, with a clear Romanesque style in later manuscripts. This is especially the case with the depiction of figures.

The features most associated with Beatus manuscripts are whole page and double spread illustrations with backgrounds in broad strips of bright, flat, primary colours. These are not found in earlier manuscripts, where illustrations often occupy less than the width of a page, and figures have a blank background within a simple border. The San Millán Beatus was illustrated in two phases, over a century apart, and shows this stylistic progression within a single manuscript.

It is thought that a significant development in the illustrations took place in the mid-10th century at the San Salvador de Tábara Monastery, whose remains are now the church of Santa Maria, in Tábara, Zamora, Spain, probably led by the monk-painter Magius. An effusive tribute to Magius by his pupil Emeterius is written in the fragmentary Tábara Beatus (only 8 miniatures surviving), which Magius left unfinished at his death in 968, and Emeterius completed. The Morgan Beatus (c. 945) is thought to be all by Magius, and the Gerona Beatus by Emeterius and the nun Ende, who signed it; this was finished in 975. Apart from these three surviving MS made by the Tábara team, there are thought, on the basis of textual analysis, to have been three others, now lost.

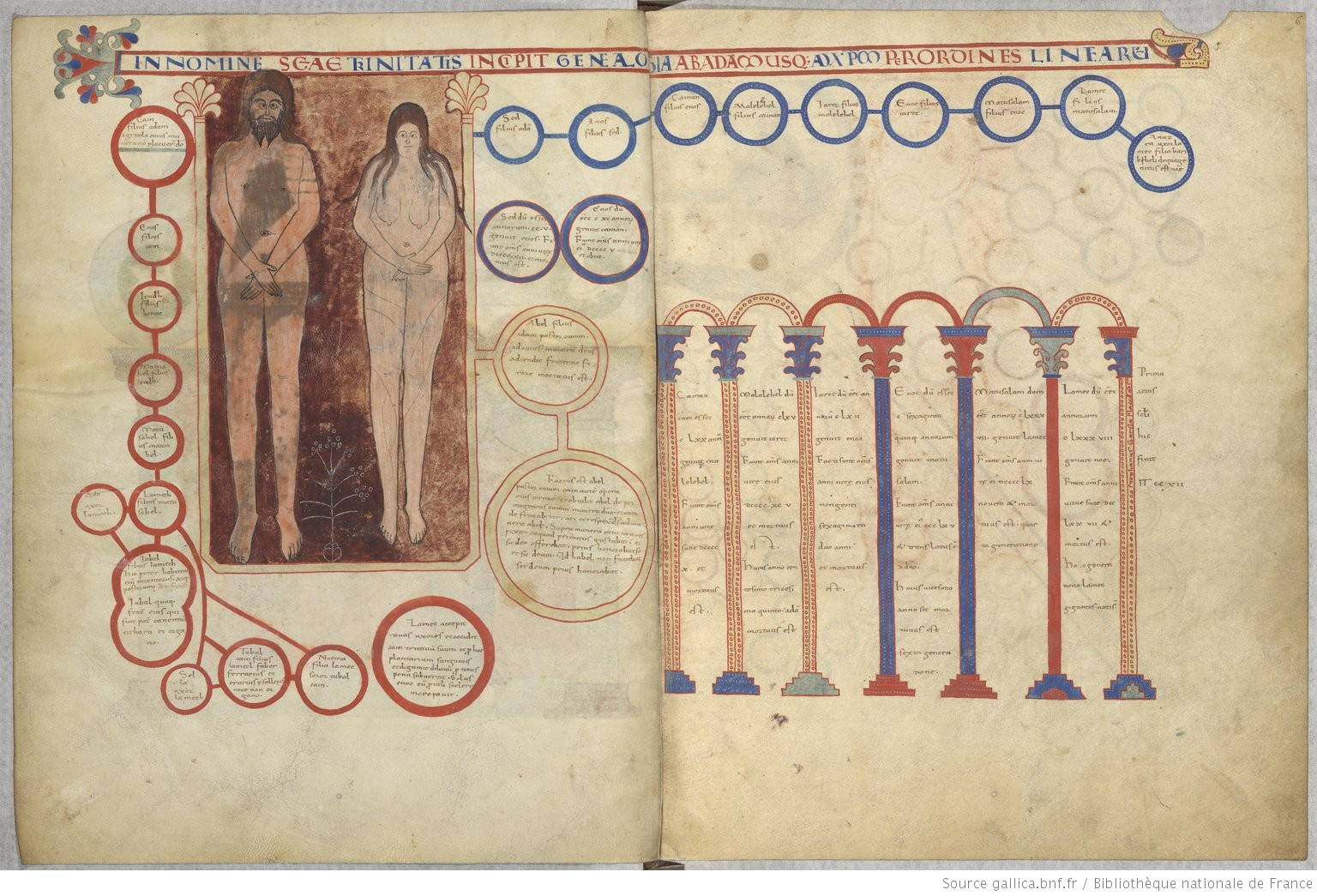
The start of the genealogy of Christ in the Saint-Sever Beatus

The innovations at Tábara included new subjects, and a move to miniatures that occupied a full page, or spread across two pages, this last being something not known from any earlier books. The "polychromatic striped backgrounds that characterize the so-called Mozarabic style of illumination" now appear; the Morgan Beatus is nearly complete, with 68 full-page miniatures, and 48 smaller, and so the best exemplar of this phase. Magius was probably influenced by his contemporary Florentius of Valeránica, who worked about 150 miles away to the east, borrowing both some images and some of his prefactory text from the León Bible of 960, illustrated by Florentius and an assistant.

Images new to Beatus manuscripts found in the Beatus and clearly taken from the León Bible of 960 (or a very similar MS) include a set of Evangelist portraits of a distinctive type, the text and decorative illumination of an extensive genealogy of Christ (over fourteen pages with about 600 names), and a set of images illustrating Jerome's Commentary on the Book of Daniel, the text of which was also included.The Morgan Adoration of the Lamb also takes distinctive features of the León Christ in Majesty.

By the time of later manuscripts such as the Saint-Sever Beatus, probably from around 1150, the decorated initials and similar elements of ornament were in a clearly Romanesque style, and figures were rather better drawn, but the old compositions and features such as the large coloured bands persisted. In the Portuguese Apocalypse of Lorvão, dated 1189, many illustrations are once again less than a full page.

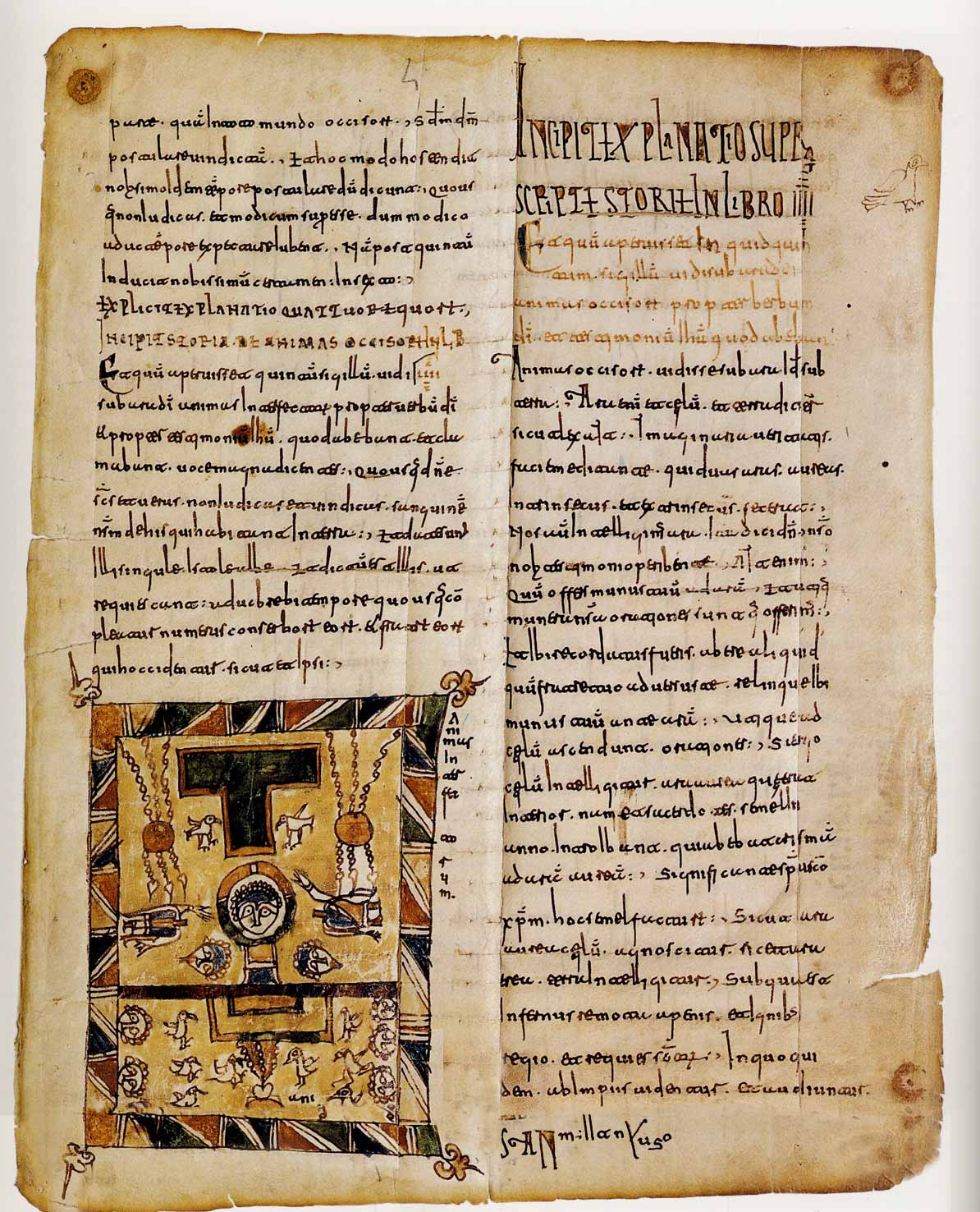
Page from the Silos fragment, the earliest survival, c. 885. Opening of the Fifth Seal

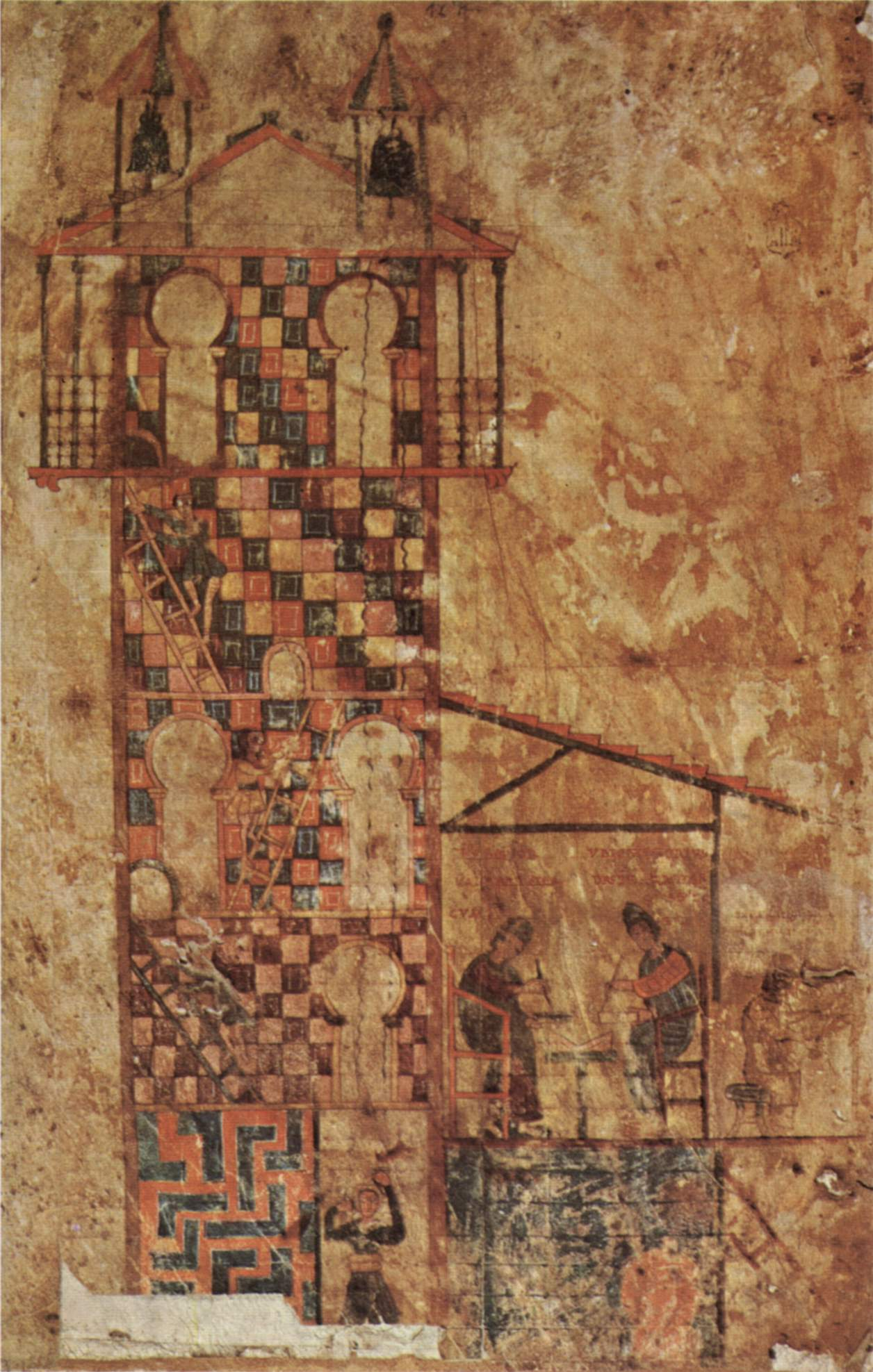
Unusual miniature from the Tábara Beatus, c. 970; the monastery tower there, with three people working in the scriptorium

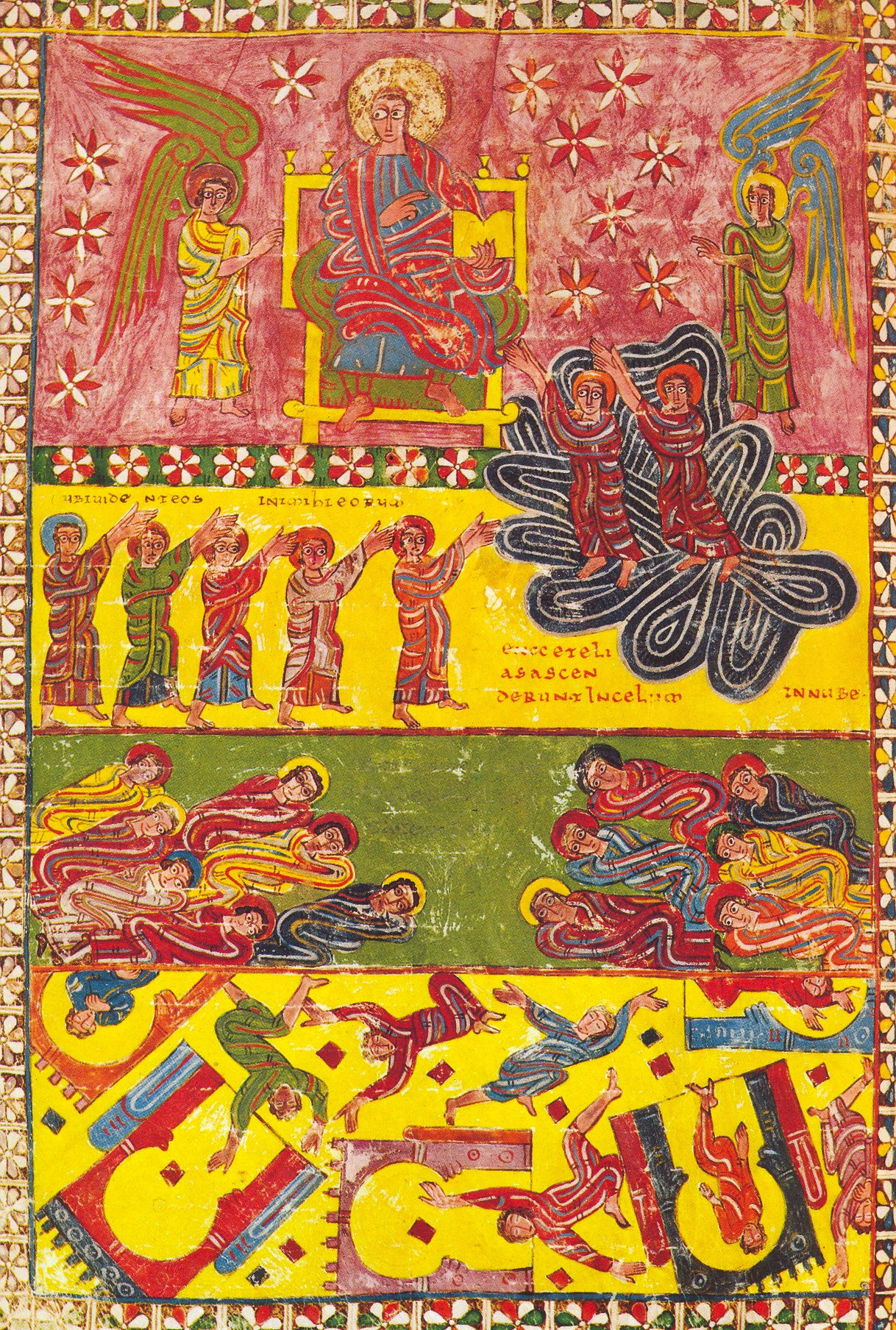
The Ascension of the Two Witnesses, Morgan Beatus (c. 945)

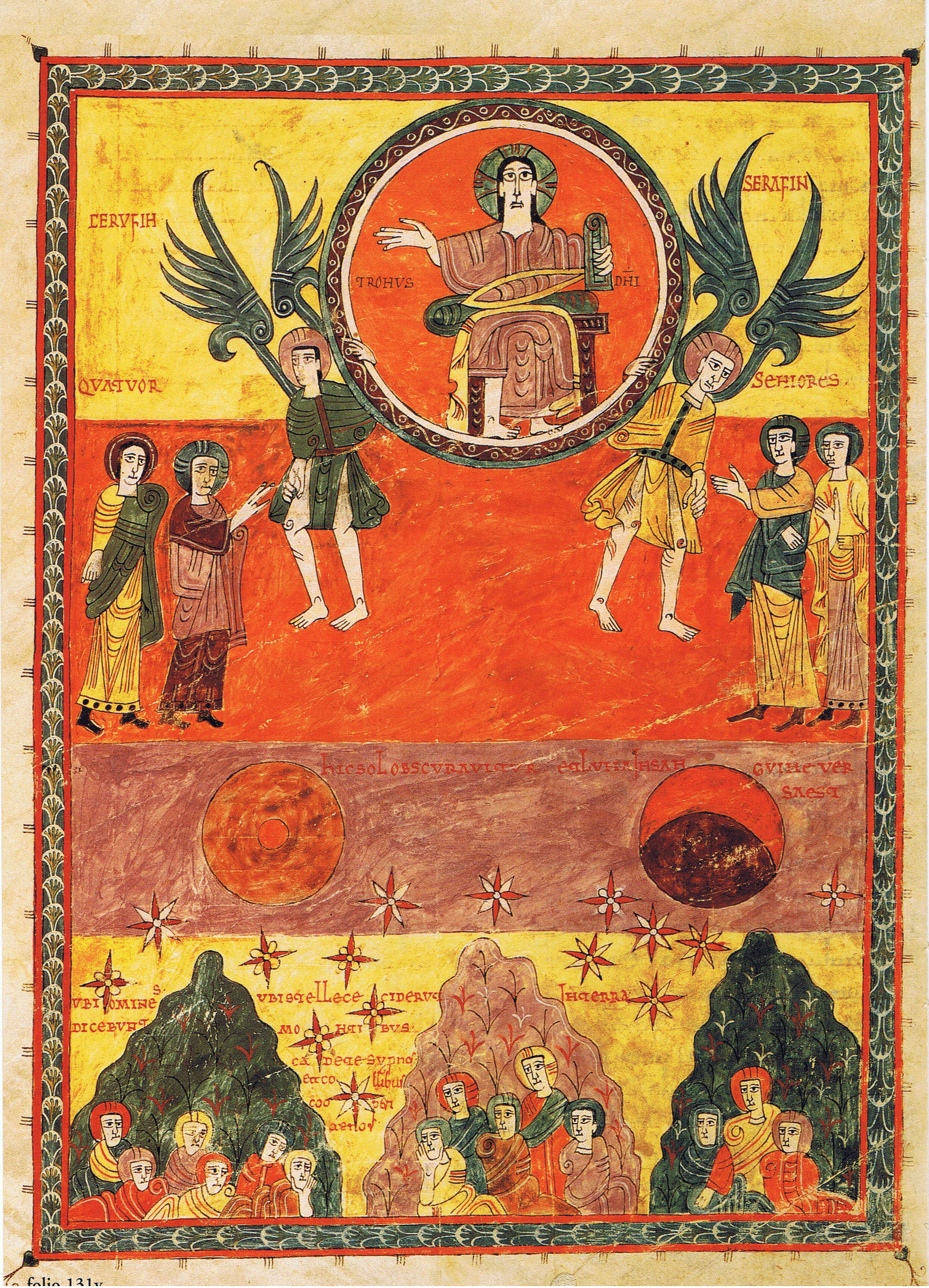
Opening of the Sixth Seal, Gerona Beatus, by 975

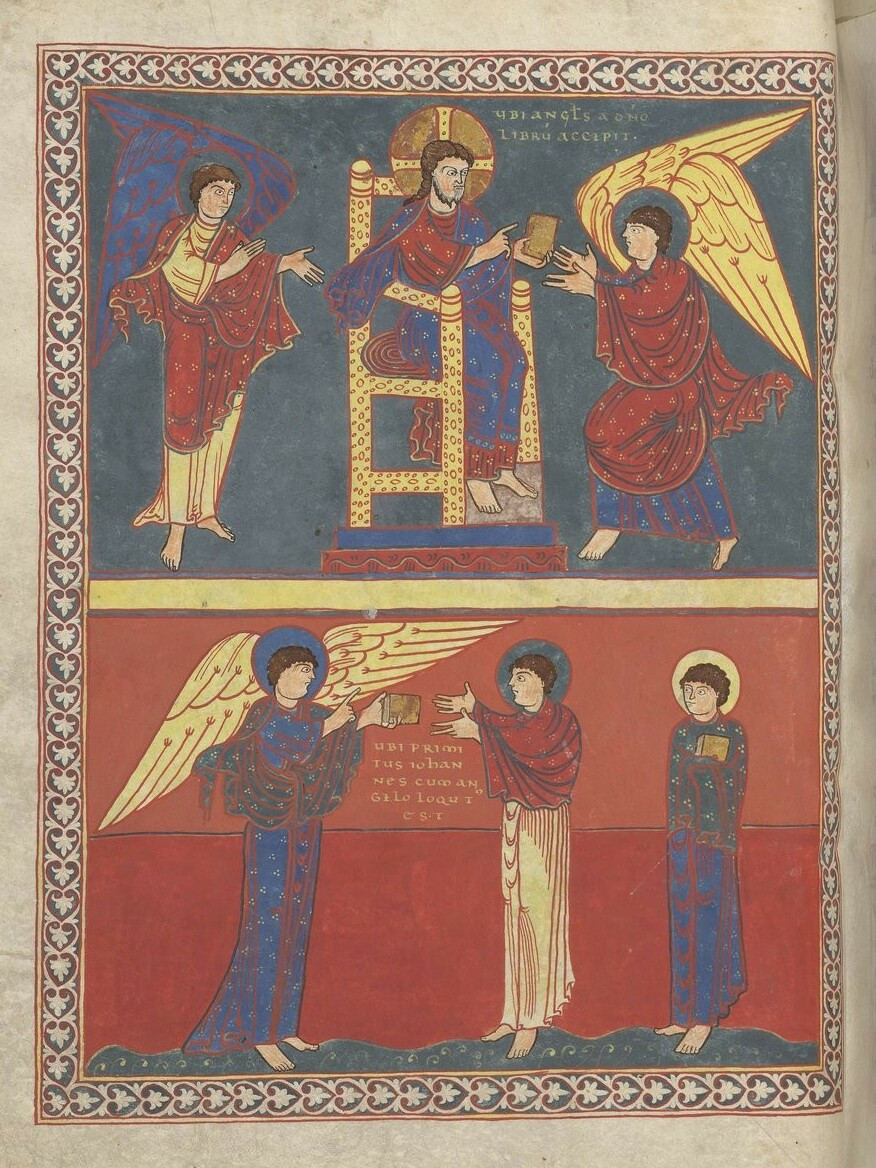
Angel transmitting the revelation of the apocalypse to John, Saint-Sever Beatus, 12th century

== Context ==
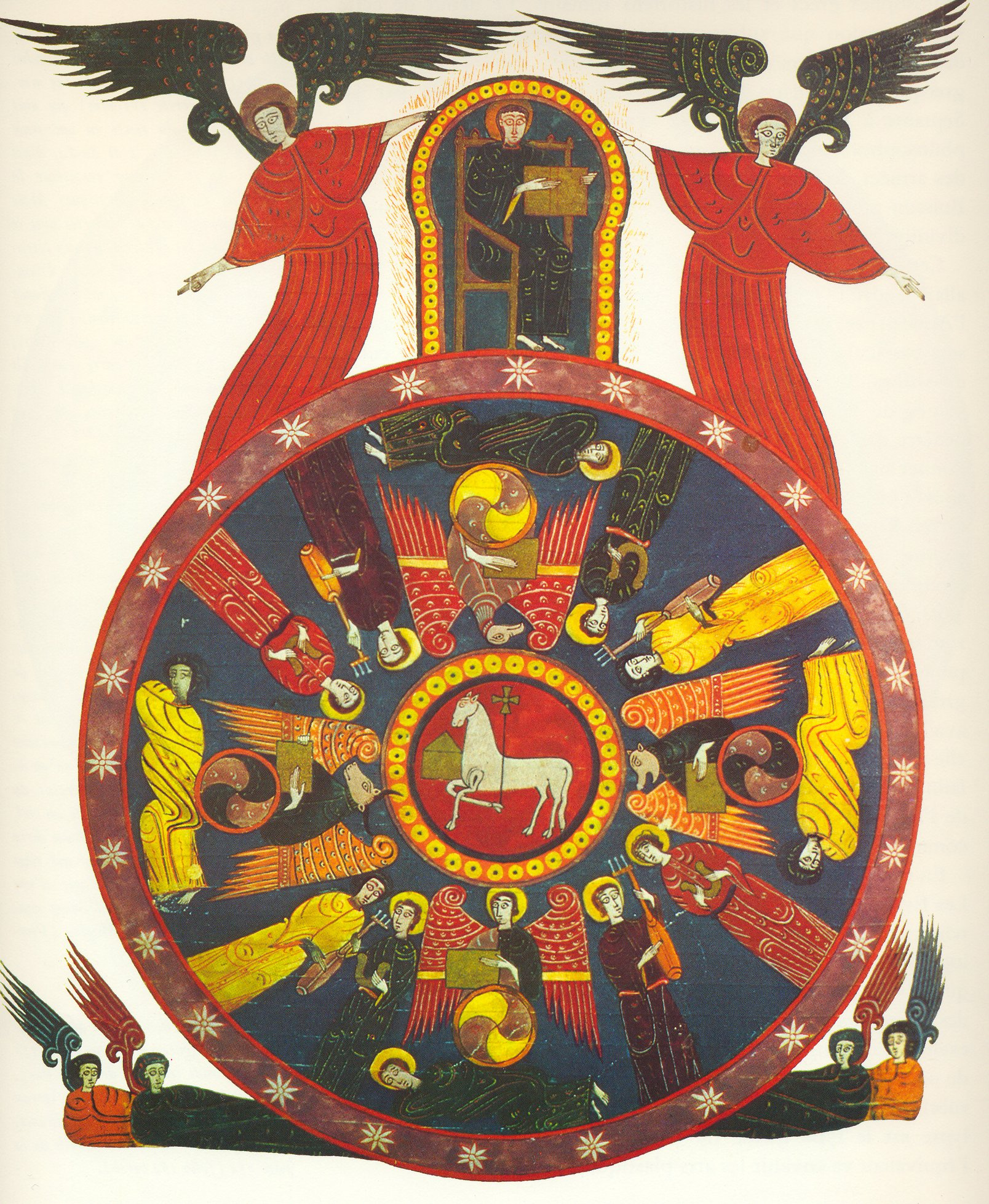
Vision of the Lamb, the four cherubim and the Twenty-Four Elders from the Facundus-Beatus (f. 117v)

The Kingdom of Toledo fell in 711, leaving most of the Iberian Peninsula in the hands of Muslim conquerors. Christians under Pelayo managed to establish the Kingdom of Asturias on the northern coast, protected by the Cantabrian Mountains, initially the only Christian state on the peninsula. Beautus lived in the Cantabrian valley of Liébana. With the recent conquest of the Iberian Peninsula, the Apocalypse and the symbolism in it took on a different meaning. The beast, which had previously been believed to represent the Roman Empire, for Iberian believers now became the Caliphate, and Babylon was no longer Rome, but Córdoba.

Revelation is a book about the Church's problems throughout all ages, not about history per se. In the middle of Book 4 of 12, Beatus does state his guess about the end-date of the world as 801 AD, from the number of the Holy Spirit plus Alpha, as well as a few other calculations, although he warns people that it is folly to try to guess a date that even Jesus in the Bible claimed not to know. This expected date, or 800 AD, was shared by many Christians at the time, although the papacy and church authorities discouraged such speculations.

Probably dying in the last years of the century, but after 785, Beatus did not quite live to see his guess disproved, but in the next century the approach of the year 1000 raised widespread concern across Europe that this would see the start of the events prophesied in Revelation; there is a particular concentration of Beatus manuscripts dated to about 950 to 975. After the millennium failed to produce, some 11th-century forecasters switched to 1033, as being 1000 years after the death and Resurrection of Jesus.

In continuity with previous commentaries written in the Tyconian tradition, and in continuity with St. Isidore of Seville and St. Apringius of Beja from just a few centuries before him, Beatus' Commentary on the Apocalypse focuses on the sinless beauty of the eternal Church, and on the tares growing among the wheat in the Church on Earth. Persecution from outside forces like pagan kings and heretics is mentioned, but it is persecution from fellow members of the Church that Beatus spends hundreds of pages on. Anything critical of the Jews in the Bible is specifically said to have contemporary effect as a criticism of Christians, and particularly of monks and other religious, and a good deal of what is said about pagans is stated as meant as a criticism of Christians who worship their own interests more than God. Muslims are barely mentioned, except as references to Christian heresies include them.

== Copies of the manuscript ==
There are 35 surviving copies, 27 of which are tabled below. Williams (building on the work of other scholars, especially Wilhelm Neuss) estimates there were once about a hundred illustrated copies, and the "family tree" he illustrates shows divergence into two, then three, branches before 900, with differences both in the text and the artistic style. The earliest surviving fragment, at the abbey of Santo Domingo de Silos, is already from about a century after the work was written. Two were produced in modern Portugal (one is the Apocalypse of Lorvão dated 1189) and the Saint-Sever Beatus in southern France, near the modern Spanish border. There appear to have been three manuscripts made in southern Italy in the 11th century.

=== Illustrated in the Iberian Peninsula ===
==== 9th through 11th centuries ====
Date finished	Manuscript ID	Names known as	Current repository	Other information	Links to image archives	Example image	Illustrator
9th century	unknown	Beatus of Cirueňa; Silos fragment Nájera fragment	Abbey of Santo Domingo de Silos	Reached Silos in the 18th century, from Nájera.			Unknown
Middle of the 10th century. Alternative dates include the end of the 9th century, 920–930 and 925–935.	Ms. Vitrina 14.1 Codex	Emilianense Beatus; Emilianense Codice; Beatus of San Millán; *Emilianense Codex	Biblioteca Nacional, Madrid.		Vit. 14-1 Beati in Apocalipsin libri duodecim. (Emilianenses Codice); Emilianense Codex images at Wikimedia Commons		
Circa 960	Ms 644	*Morgan Beatus; *Beatus of San Miguel de Escalada; *Beatus of Magius)	Morgan Library (New York)	280 x 380 mm. 89 miniatures. Some reproductions have name Pierpont attached for the Pierpont Morgan Library.	*Ms 644 Morgan Beatus. Click on image to access all pages.	Illustration from Morgan Beatus of scene from Revelation 14, which describes a vision of the Lamb, Jesus, and 144,000 people standing on Mount Zion	Illustrated by Magius, archipictor.
Circa 950–955	Ms. Cod. & II.5	*Escorial Beatus of San Millán; *Beatus of the monastery of the Escorial)	El Escorial, Real Biblioteca de San Lorenzo	225 x 355 mm. 151 leaves; 52 miniatures.	*Ms. Cod. & II.5 Escorial Beatus of San Millán.	Page of an angel blowing his horn, from the Escorial Beatus, Spain, Circa 950-970 A.D.	Unknown
Circa 968–970	AHN CODICES, L.1097	Beatus of Tábara.	Archivo Histórico Nacional	Very incomplete, only 8 illustrations surviving, some large.	*Ms 1097 B Beatus of San Salvador de Távara. Click on image to access all pages. * AHN CODICES, L.1097 Beatus of Tábara	Tabara Beatus, Angel blows horn and earth is poisoned	Magius (finished by his apprentice Emeterio at the Monastery of Tábara, Zamora.)
Circa 970	Ms. 433 (ex ms 390)	Beatus of Valcavado.	Valladolid. Biblioteca de la Universidad	97 miniatures extant	*Ms. 433 Beatus of Valcavado Click on image to access all pages.	Page from Valcavado Beatus, showing 3 Jewish youths in the fiery furnace, and people worshipping a dark god.	Painted by Oveco for the abbot Semporius.
Circa 975	Ms. 26	*Beatus of La Seu d'Urgell. *Urgell Beatus of Rioja or León; *Beatus of the Cathedral of Urgell)	archives of the Cathedral of La Seu d'Urgell	90 miniatures	*Ms. 26 Urgell Beatus. Click on image to access all pages.	Urgell Beatus, f. 209 (detail): Siege of Jerusalem by Nebudchadnezzar	Illustrator unknown
Circa 975	Ms. 7	*Gerona Beatus; Beatus of Gerona; Beatus of Távara	Girona Cathedral. Archives.	260 x 400 mm. 280 leaves. 160 miniatures	*Ms. 7 Gerona Beatus (Girona Beatus) Click on image to access all pages.: iDai BOOK-ZID1353114	Gerona Beatus, Noahs ark, the flood which wipes out mankind, which had become evil before God.	Painted by Emeterius (pupil of Magius) and by the nun Ende.
990 AD & 11th century A.D. Circa 920–930	Ms. 33	Beatus of San Millán de la Cogolla.	Real Academia de la Historia, Madrid	This was illustrated in 2 phases. Phase 1, 10th century, Mozarabic style. Phase 2, end of 11th century, in Romanesque style.	* Ms. 33 Beato de San Millan de la Cogolla. *Ms. 33 Beato de San Millan de la Cogolla. (Select images); *Ms. 33 (black and white images)		Unknown
1047	Ms. Vit. 14.2	*Codex of Fernando I and Doña Sancha *Beatus of León; *Beatus of Facundo; *Beato of Facundus; *Beatos de la Biblioteca Nacional de España; Beato de Fernando I y doña Sancha	Biblioteca Nacional, Madrid	Made for Ferdinand I and Queen Sancha. 267 x 361 mm. 312 leaves. 98 miniatures.	*VITR 14.2 (pdf)Beato of Liébana: Codice of Fernando I and Dña. Sancha. (Facundo/Facundus)	Facundus Beatus, f. 186v: "And there appeared a great wonder in Heaven; a woman clothed with the sun, and the moon under her feet, and upon her head a crown of twelve stars: And she being with child cried, travailing in birth, and pained to be delivered. And there appeared another wonder in Heaven; and behold a great red dragon, having seven heads and ten horns, and seven crowns upon his heads" (Revelation, 12.1–3) Facundus Beatus, f. 6v: "I am Alpha and Omega, the beginning and the ending, saith the Lord, which is, and which was, and which is to come, the Almighty." (Revelation, 1.8)	Illustrated by Facundo/Facundus
1040/1060		Beatus of Fanlo	Morgan Library, New York				
Circa 1086	Cod. 1	*Beatus of Burgo of Osma. *Beatus of Liébana - Burgo de Osma Codex	Cathedral of Burgo de Osma.	225 x 360 mm. 166 folios. 71 thumbnails.	*iDAI		Scribe: Petrus. Painter: Martinus.
1091–1109	Add MS 11695	*Beatus of Santo Domingo de Silos	London. British Library		* Add MS 11695 British Library access to Beatus of Santo Domingo de Silos. * Add MS 11695 Beatus of Santo Domingo de Silos. Click on image to access all pages. *Silos Apocalypse images at Wikimedia Commons	Musician in the Silos Apocalypse.	Two scribes, Dominicus and Munnius. Illuminator, the prior Petrus.

==== 12th and 13th centuries ====
Date finished	Manuscript ID	Names known as	Current repository	Other information	Links to image archives	Example image	Illustrator
Circa 12th century	Ms. Nouv. Acq. Lat. 1366	Beatus of Navarra. (Beatus of Liébana - Navarra Codex).	Bibliothèque Nationale de France, Paris.	60 illuminations.			
Date of creation unknown. 12th century.	J.II.1 (olim lat.93).	Beatus of Turin. (''Beato de Turín) (Beatus of Liébana - Turin Codex)	Held at Biblioteca Nazionale Universitaria, Turin.	214 folios, 360 x 275 mm, 106 miniatures			
ca. 1175.	Latin MS 8	Beatus super Apocalypsim, Rylands Beatus	Manchester, John Rylands Library	254 folios, 454 mm x width: 326 mm	University of Manchester, Digital Collections	Vision of the Lamb from the Beatus super Apocalypsim (The 'Rylands Beatus') (Latin MS 8), folio 89r	
Ca. 1180.	1) Museo Arqueológico Nacional in Madrid Ms. 2. (127 folios) 2) Metropolitan Museum of Art in New York (15 folios) 3) the private collection of Francisco de Zabálburu y Basabe (2 folios) 4) Museu d’Art de Girona in Girona (1).	Cardeña Beatus. (Beatus of San Pedro de Cardeña). (códice del Monasterio de San Pedro de Cardeña, Burgos).	Document split up; many pages unaccounted for. Currently accounted for folios are dispersed between collections. A facsimile edition by M. Moleiro Editor has gathered them all to recreate the original volume as it was. The Museo Arqueológical Nacional reports that the Diocesan Museum of Gerona has a folio and the Collection Heredia-Spínola of Madrid has a folio-and a-half.				
1189 A.D.		Beatus of Lorvão [L]	Arquivo Nacional da Torre do Tombo in Lisbon	created in the monastery of St Mammas in Lorvão (Portugal)			
Circa 1220. 90+ miniatures, The Morgan Library & Museum, New York. M. 429		Las Huelgas Beatus. (Beatus of Liébana - Huelga Codex).		Produced in royal monastery of Las Huelgas, probably commissioned by the queen Berengaria of Castile, sister of Alfonso VIII. (Not the Morgan Beatus, see above)			
circa 1220 A.D.	NAL 2290	Arroyo Beatus	Paris (Bibliothèque nationale) NAL 2290 and New York (Bernard H. Breslauer Collection).	Copied 1st half of the 13th century, c. 1220 in the region of Burgos, perhaps in the monastery of San Pedro de Cardeña.	https://gallica.bnf.fr/ark:/12148/btv1b10507217r	Arroyo Beatus (NAL 2290, folio 56v); the Lamb of God is adored, surrounded by the Four Evangelists (each with Elders of the Apocalypse bearing instruments and incense); the Aspostle John and an angel witness at the bottom.	

==== Not illustrated ====
- Beatus of Alcobaça. ALC. 247 Not illustrated.
- Beato ACA. Not Illustrated.
- Beato de Sahagún. Fragments. Not illustrated.

=== Copied in South Italy ===
Date finished	Manuscript ID	Names known as	Current repository	Other information	Links to image archives	Example image	Illustrator
last third of 11th century - end of 11th century A.D.	Ms. lat. 357.	Genevan Beatus	Library of Geneva, Geneva, Italy.	Originated in South Italy, Beneventan region. 97 Folios in 13 books.	e-codices page, click on image to access	Christ above, seven angels blowing trumpets below, from the Genevan Beaus.	
12th century	MS Theol. lat. Fol. 561	Berlin Beatus Beatus of Liébana Berlin Codex	Berlin, Staatsbibliothek Preussischer Kulturbesitz	98 Folios One of three Beatus manuscripts made outside Iberian Peninsula. Originated in South Italy Beatus Commentary written in Carolingian script with Beneventan notations).			
mid-11th century A.D.	Notarili 3823, fol. 2v.	Beneventan Beatus fragment.	Milan, Archivio di Stato Rubriche				

=== Copied in Southwestern France ===
Date finished	Manuscript ID	Names known as	Current repository	Other information	Links to image archives	Example image	Illustrator
circa 1038. 1060–1070 (alternate date)	Ms. Lat. 8878.	Saint-Sever Beatus Beatus of Saint-Sever	Bibliothèque Nationale de France, Paris.	Romanesque-style images	https://archive.org/details/beatusaliebanacommentariusin...beatusabtv1b52505441p/page/n2/mode/1up https://gallica.bnf.fr/ark:/12148/btv1b52505441p/f1.item	Unclean spirits. Revelation 16, verse 13: "And I saw three unclean spirits like frogs come out of the mouth of the dragon, and out of the mouth of the beast, and out of the mouth of the false prophet." (top) Seven angels with 7 plagues (bowls) illustrating Revelation 16, verse 1: "And I heard a great voice out of the temple saying to the seven angels, Go your ways, and pour out the vials of the wrath of God upon the earth."	Stephanus Garsia (and other unnamed)

== Influence ==
The Commentary on the Apocalypse strongly influenced the Guernica of Picasso.

== Gallery ==
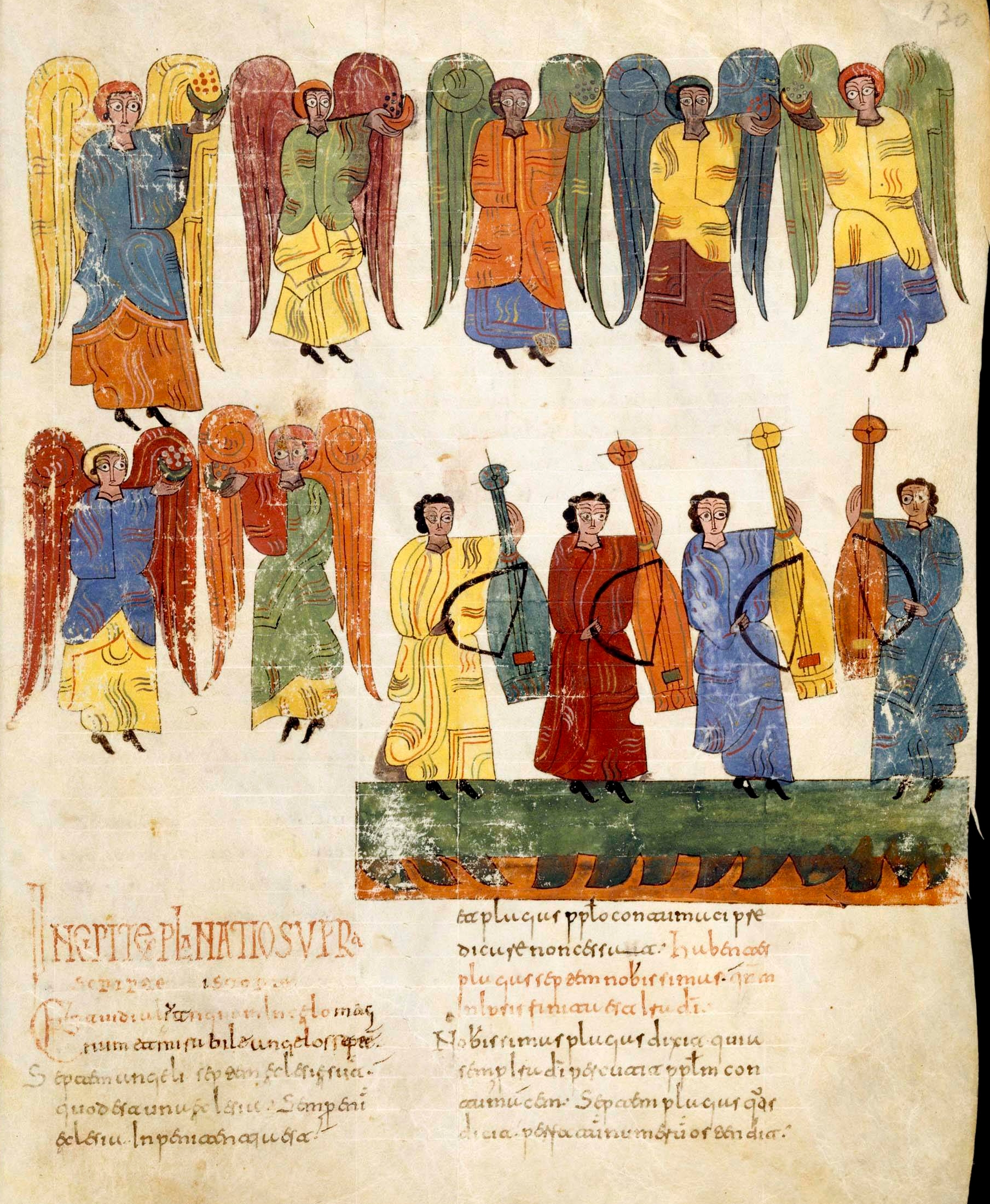
Emilianense Codice. The seven angels and the seven plagues

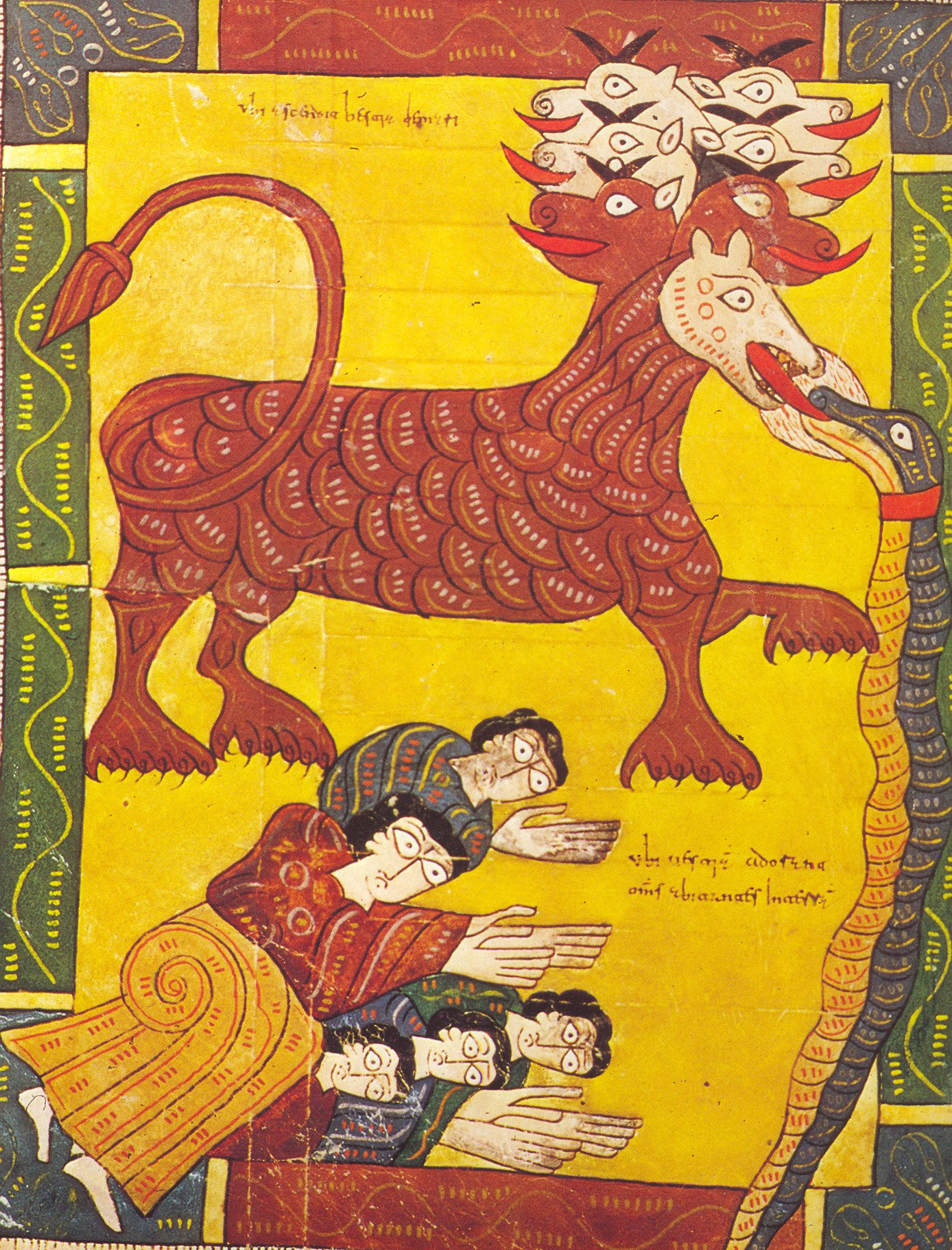
Escorial Beatus, f. 108v: Worship of the beast and dragon

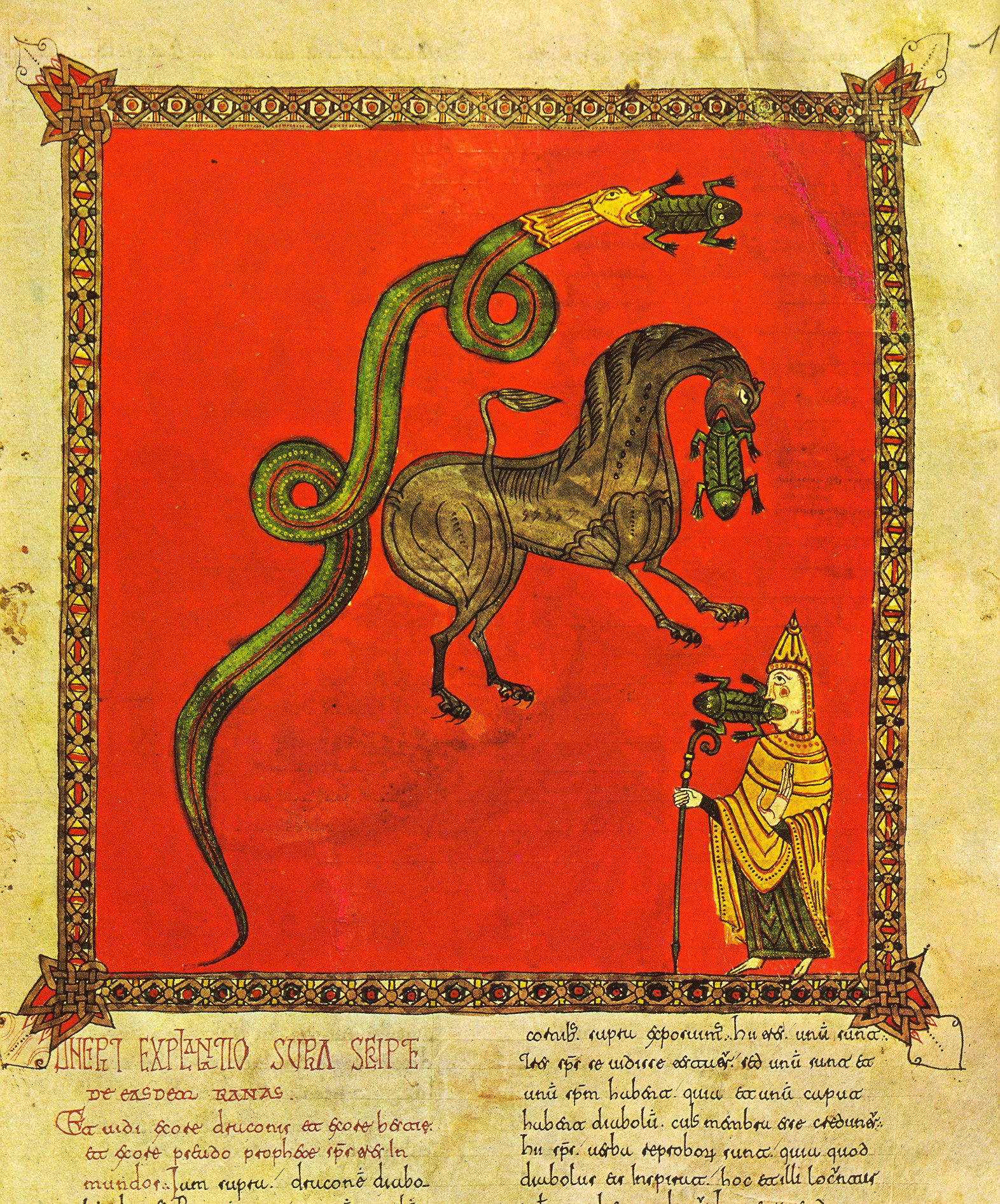
Osma Beatus, f. 139: The Frogs

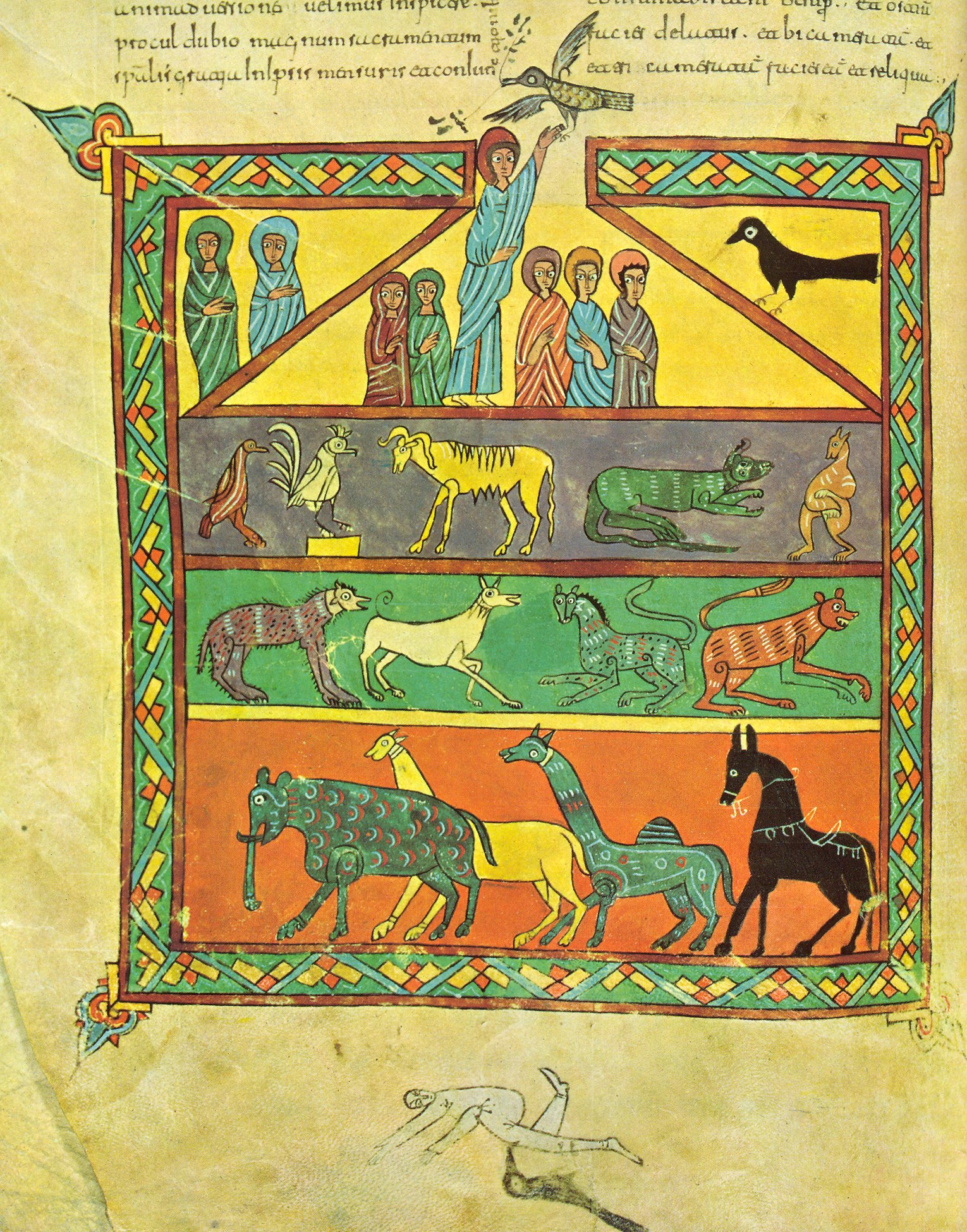
Urgell Beatus, f. 82v: Noah's Ark

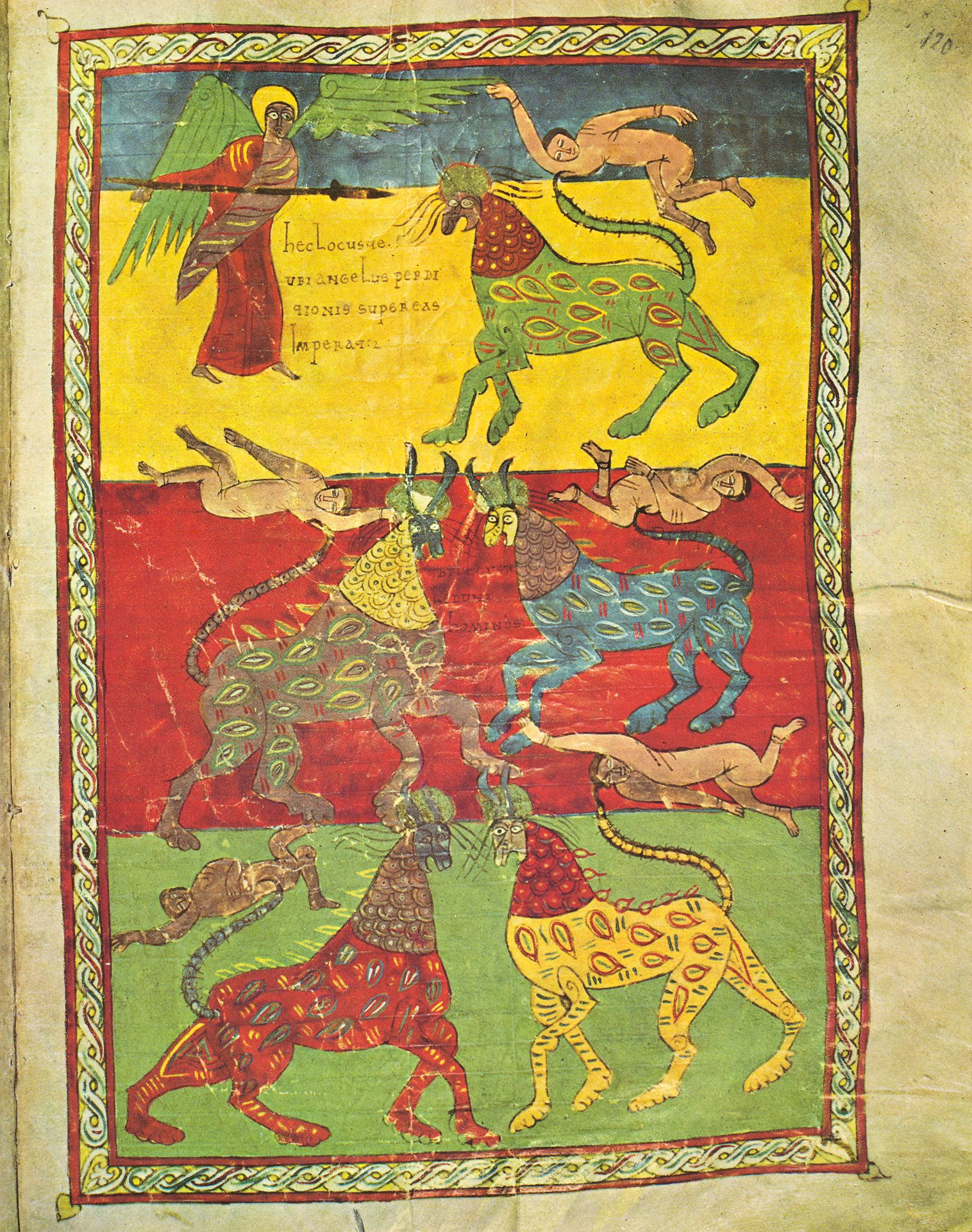
Valladolid Beatus, f. 120: The Angel of the Fifth Trumpet: "And the fifth angel sounded, and I saw a star fall from heaven unto the earth: and to him was given the key of the bottomless pit" (Revelation, 9.1)

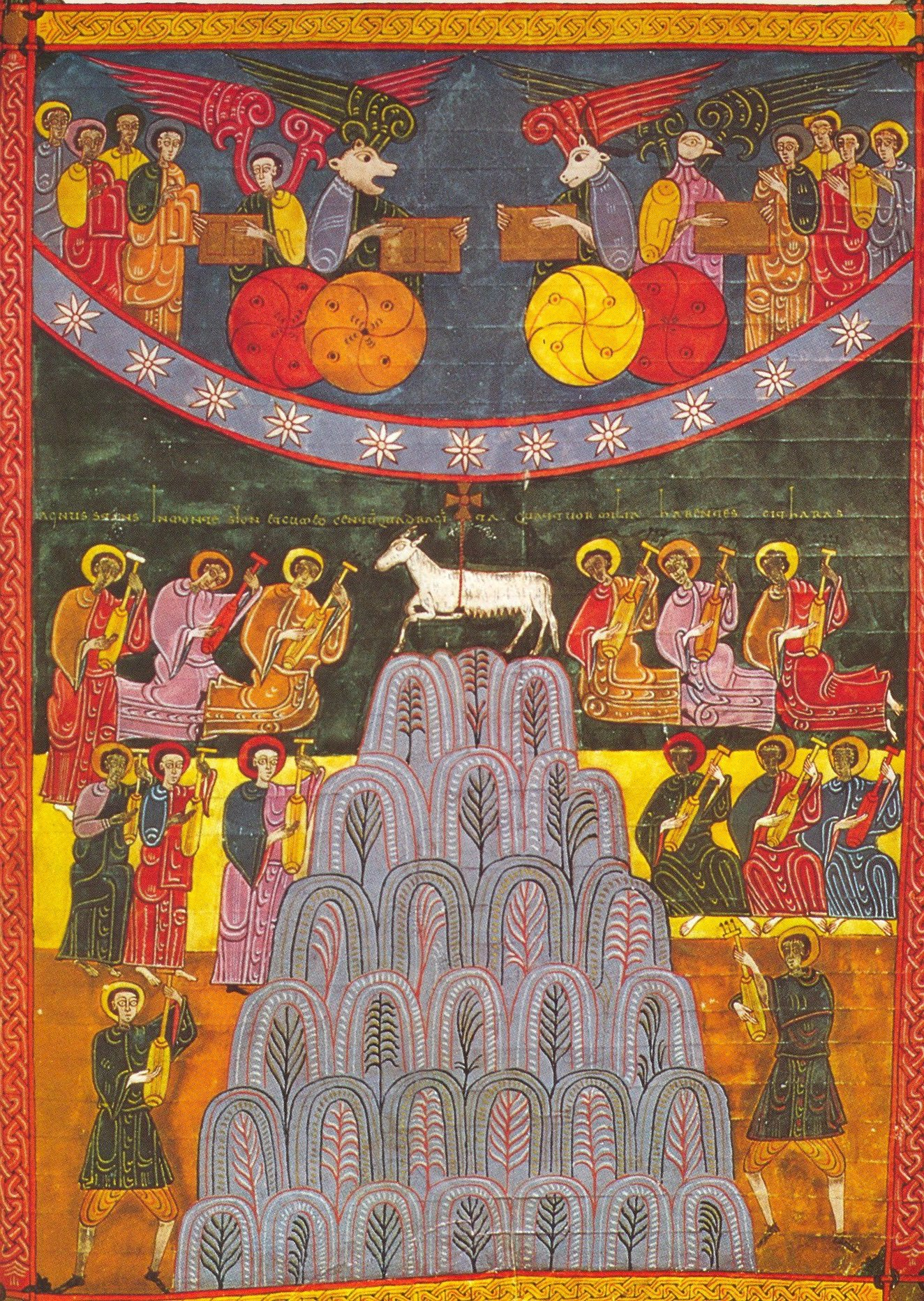
Facundus Beatus, page 410: Adoration of the Mystical Lamb on Mount Zion: A lamb stood on the Mount Zion and to one-hundred-forty-four thousand, having cytharas

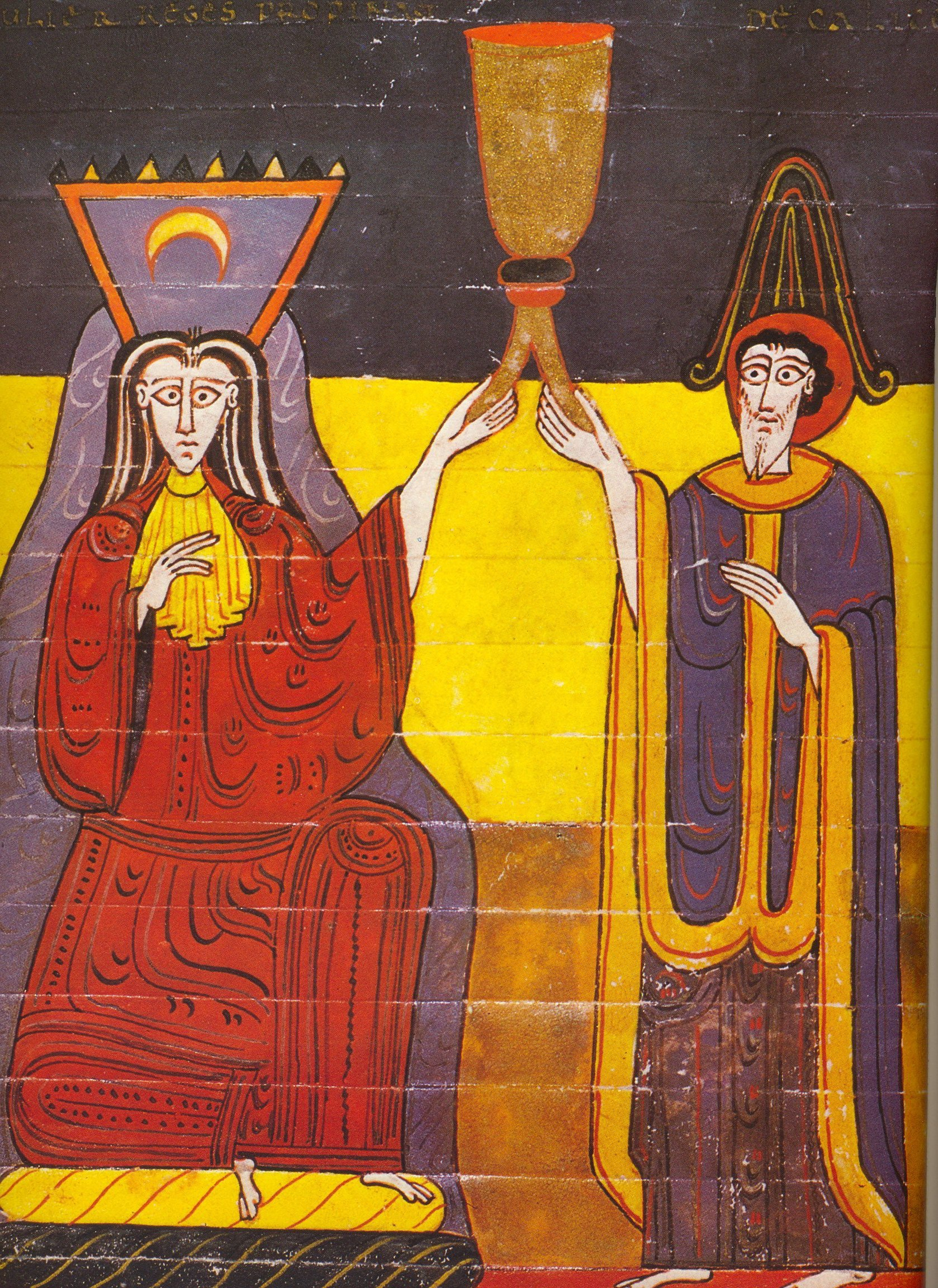
Facundus Beatus, f. 224 (detail): "And the woman was arrayed in purple and scarlet, and decked with gold and precious stone and pearls, having in her hand a golden cup full of abominations, even the unclean things of her fornication, and upon her forehead a name written: «Mystery, Babylon the Great, the mother of the harlots and of the abominations of earth.»" (Revelation, 17.4–5)

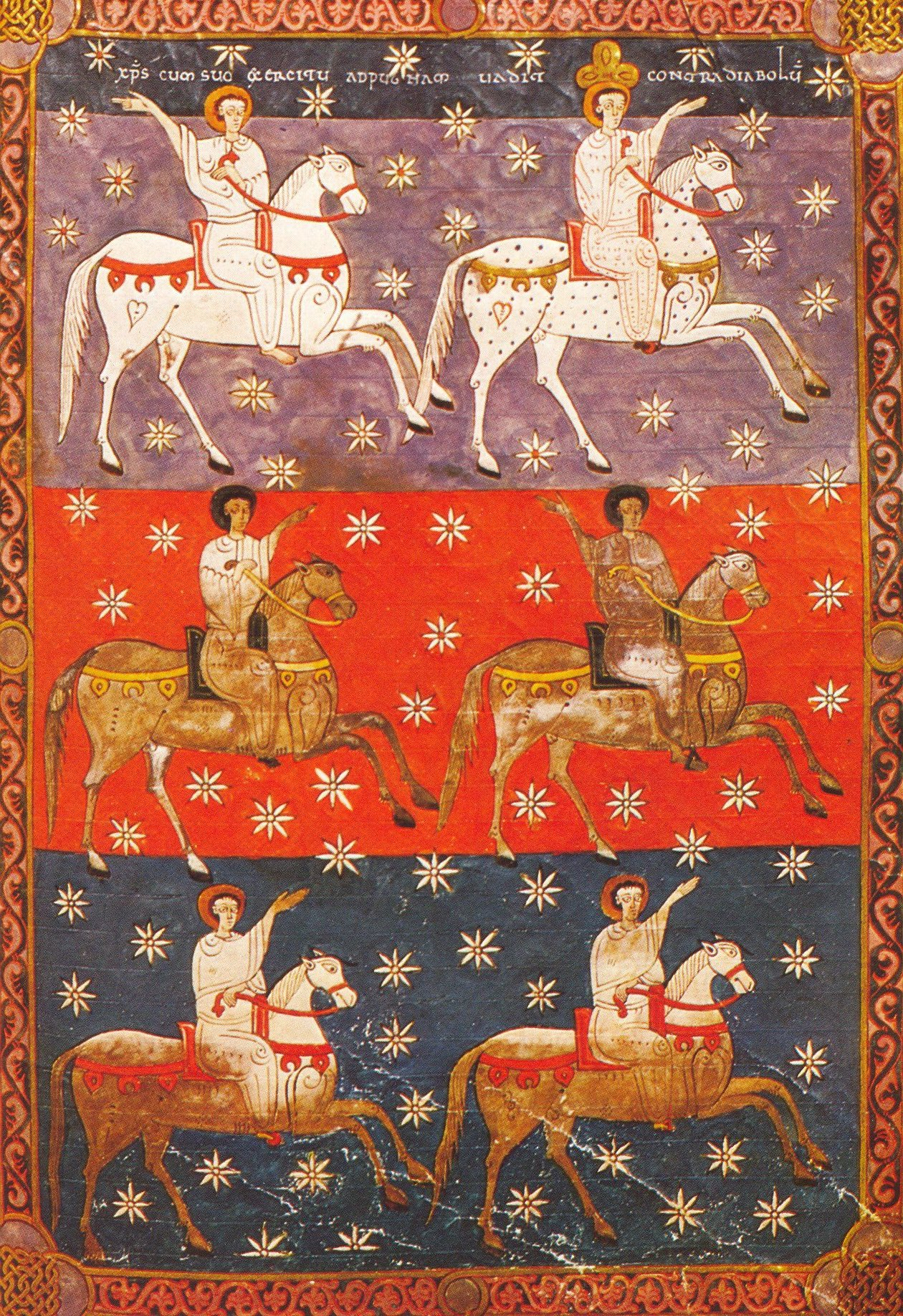
Facundus Beatus, f. 240: "And I saw heaven opened, and behold a white horse; and he that sat upon him was called «Faithful» and «True», and in righteousness he doth judge and make war. His eyes were as a flame of fire, and on his head were many crowns; and he had a name written, that no man knew, but he himself. And he was clothed with a vesture dipped in blood: and his name is called The Word of God." (Revelation, 19.11–13)

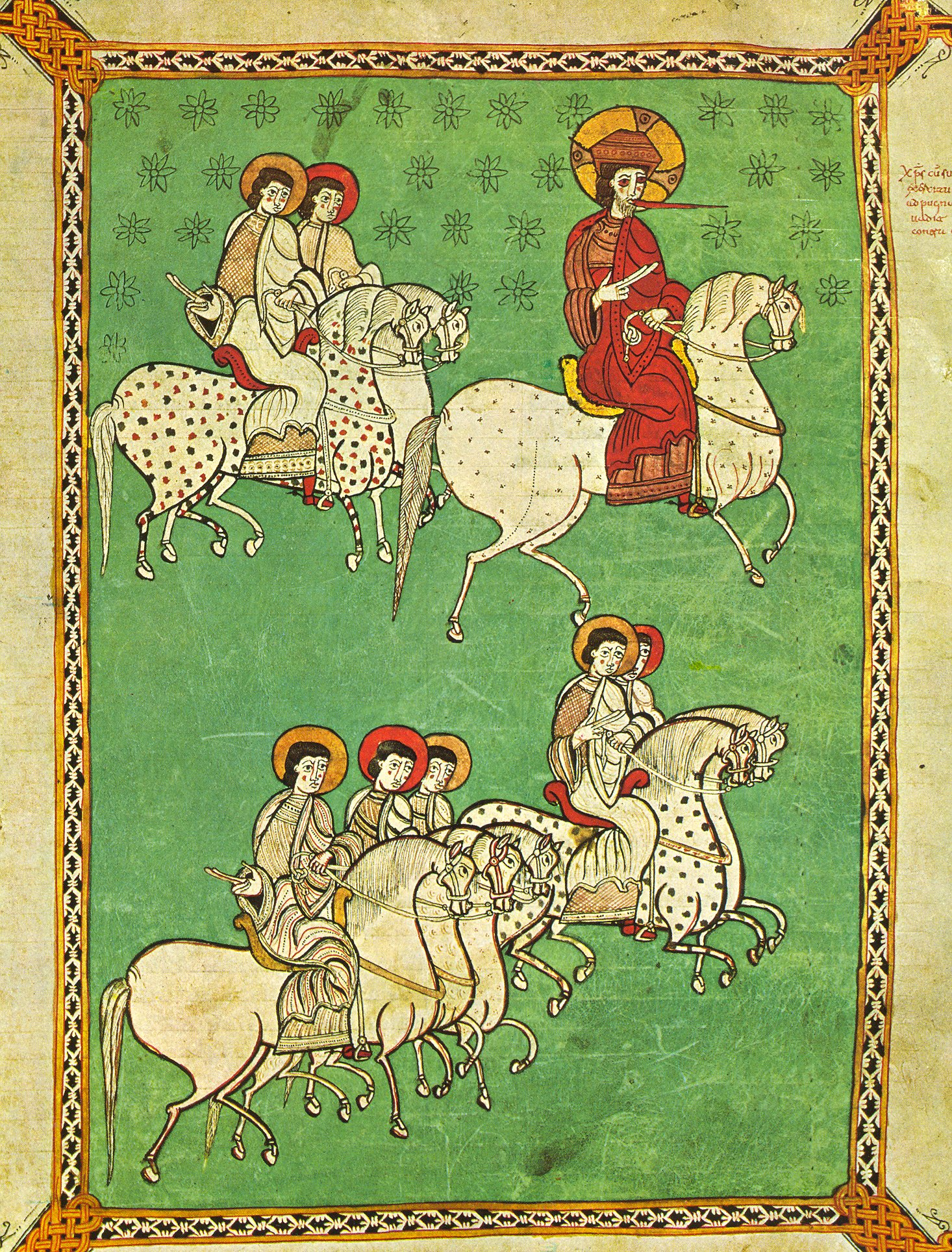
Osma Beatus, f. 151 The victorious Christ

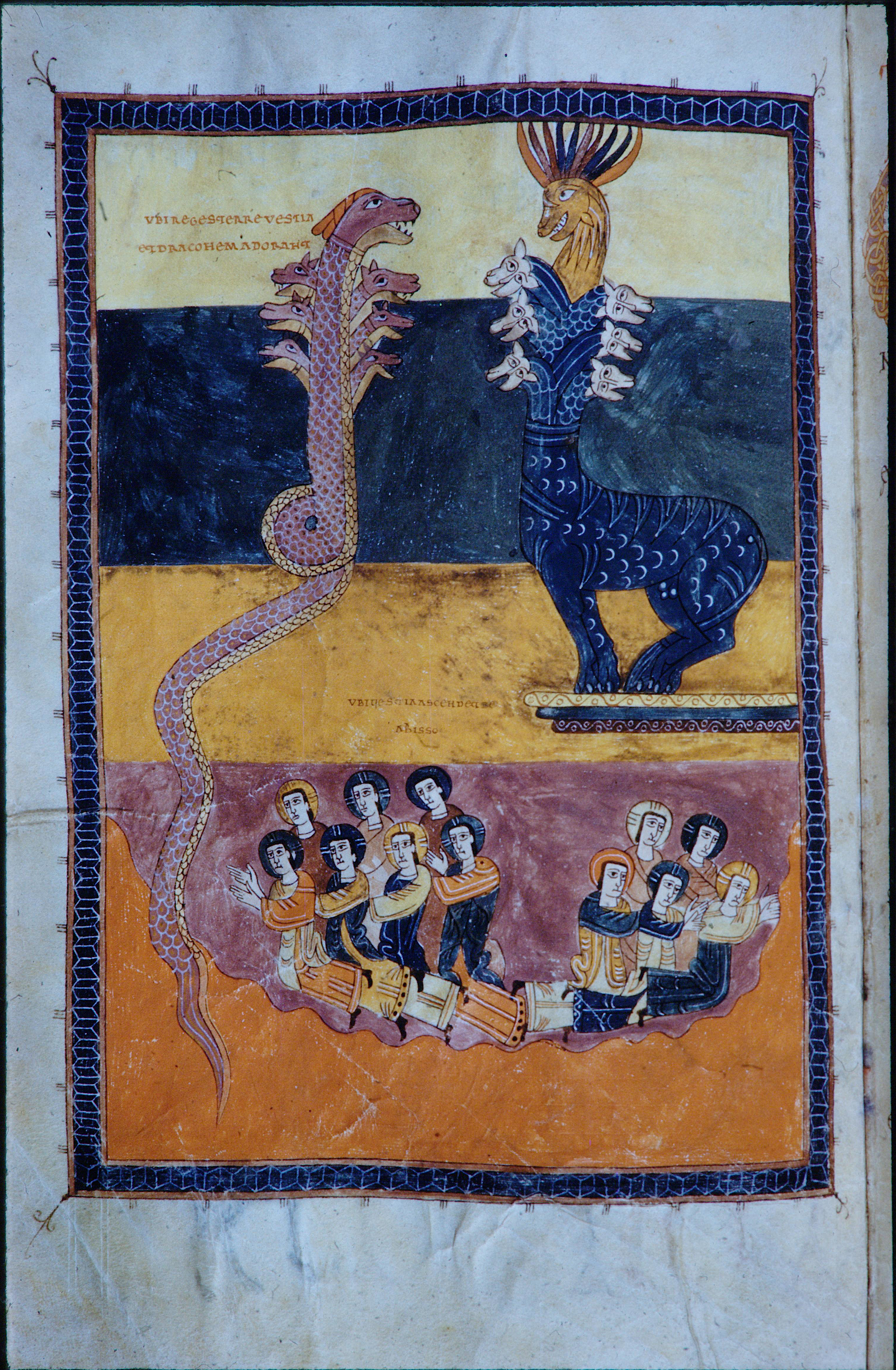
Gerona Beatus

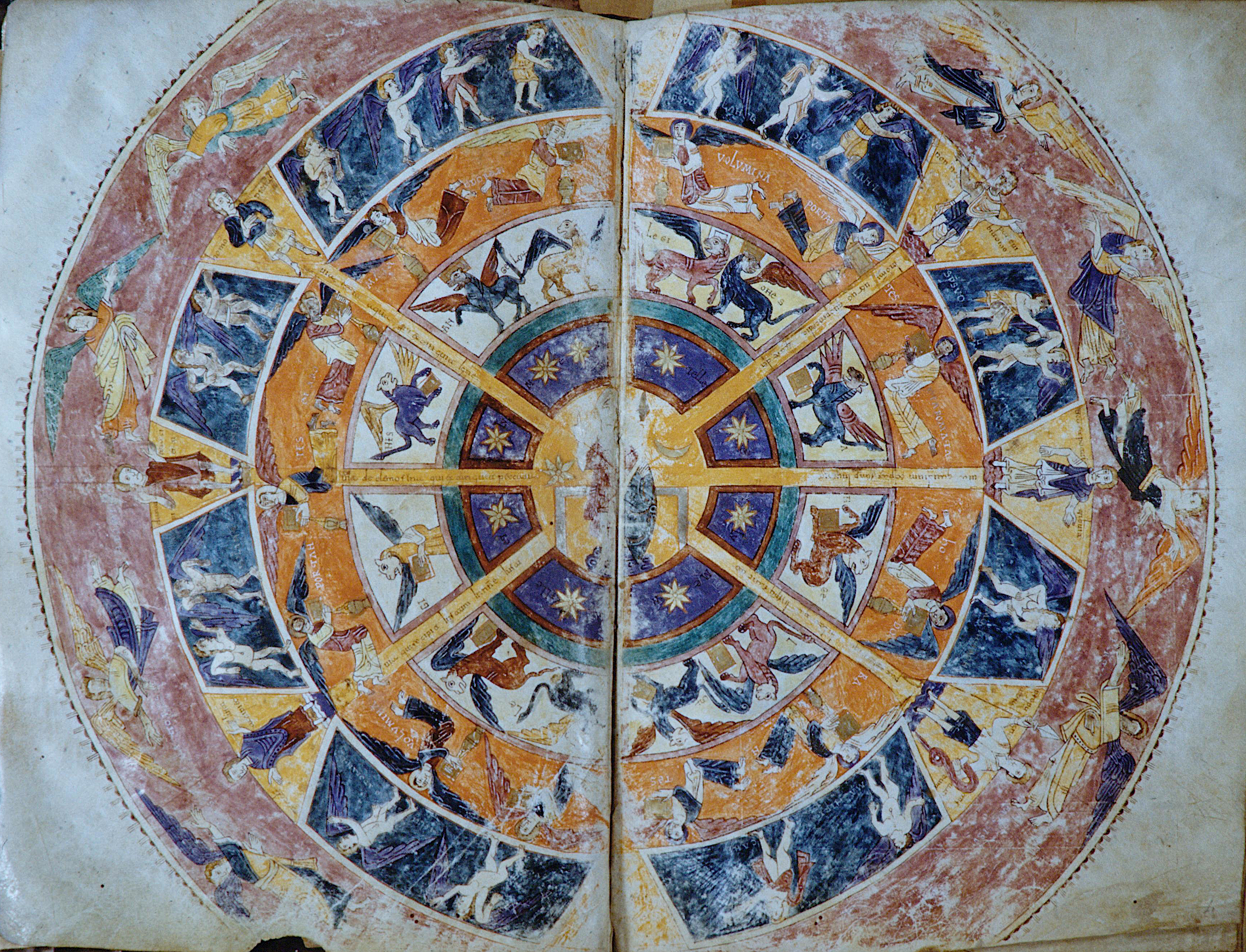
Gerona Beatus

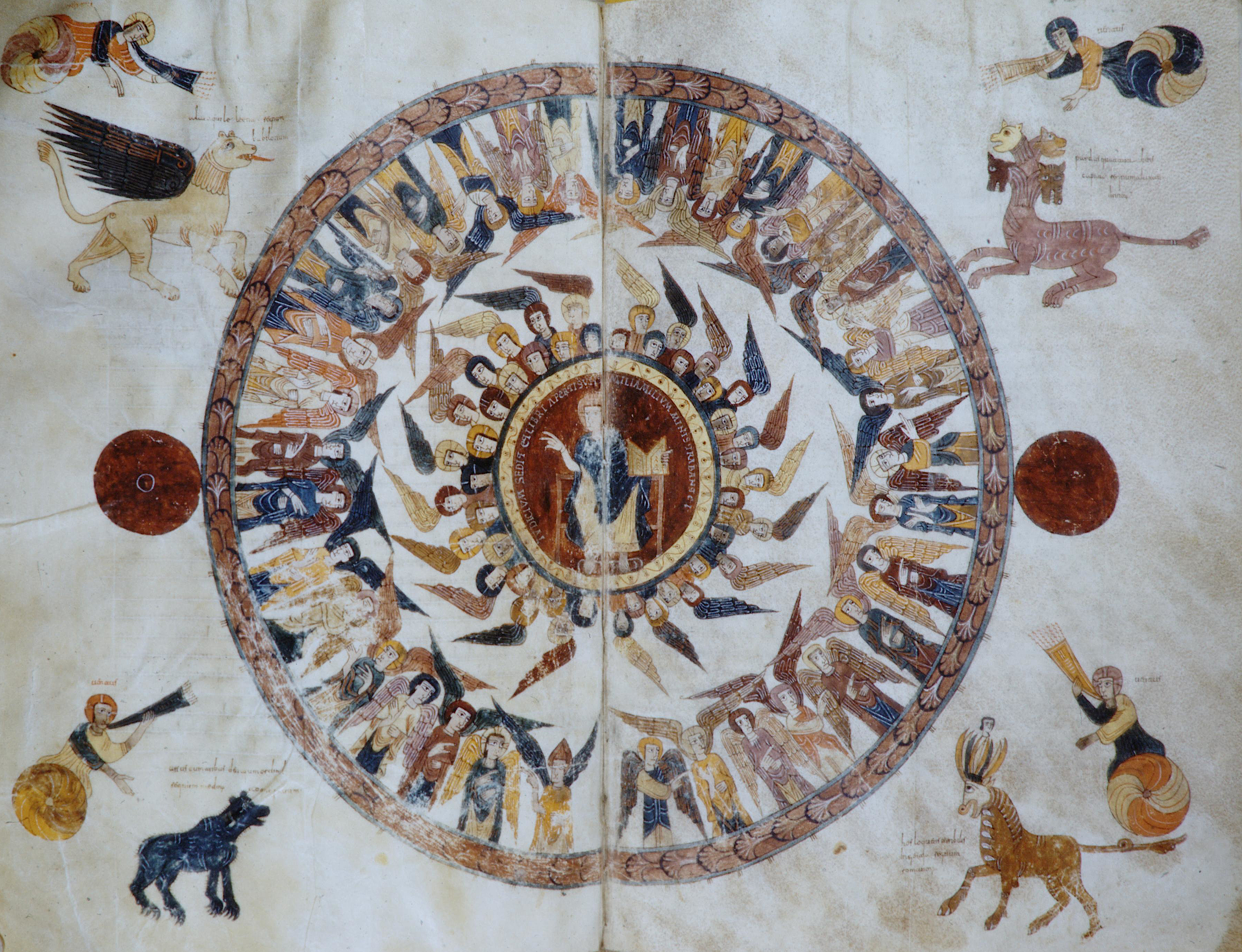
Gerona Beatus

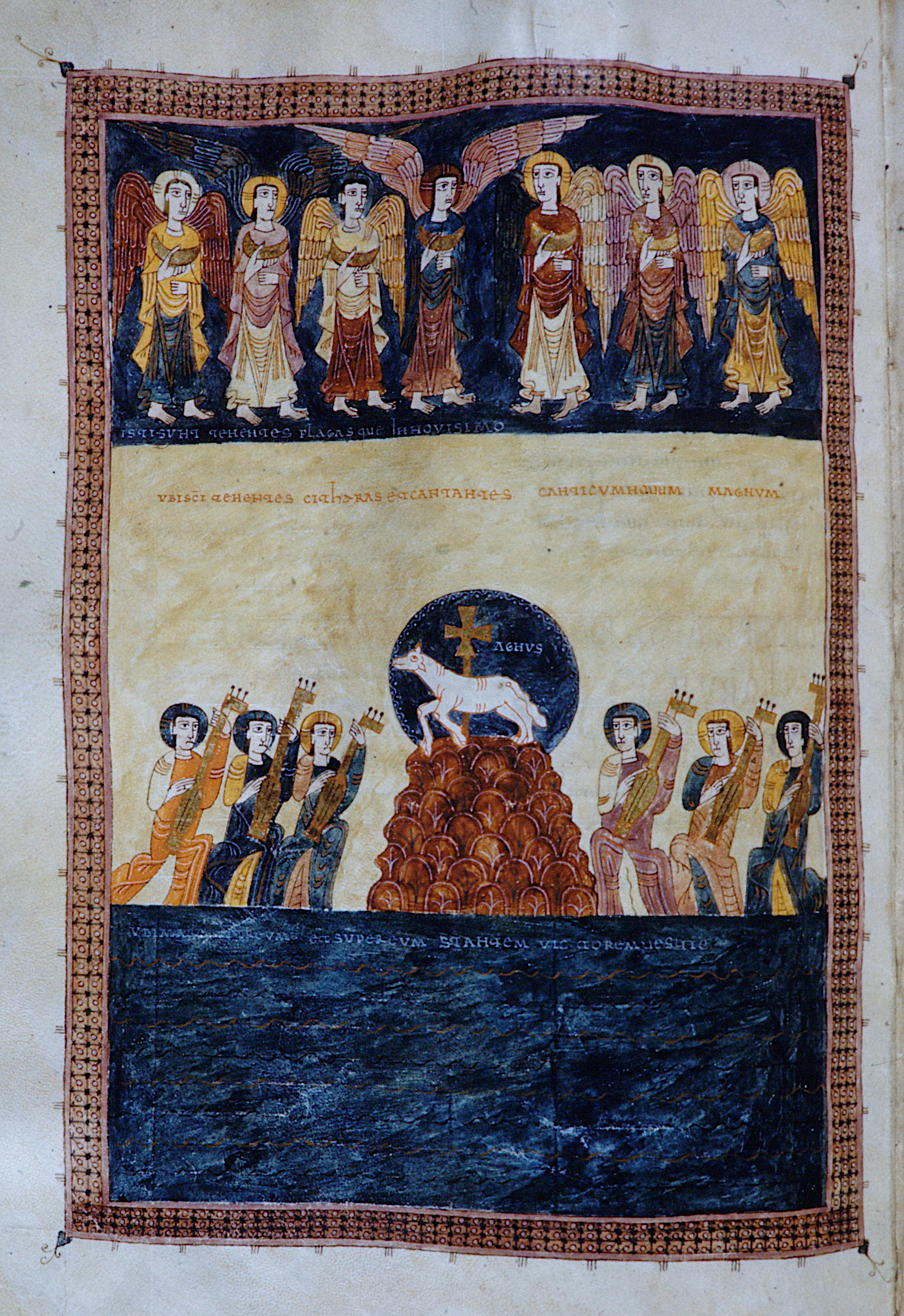
Gerona Beatus. Giving praise to the Lamb of God

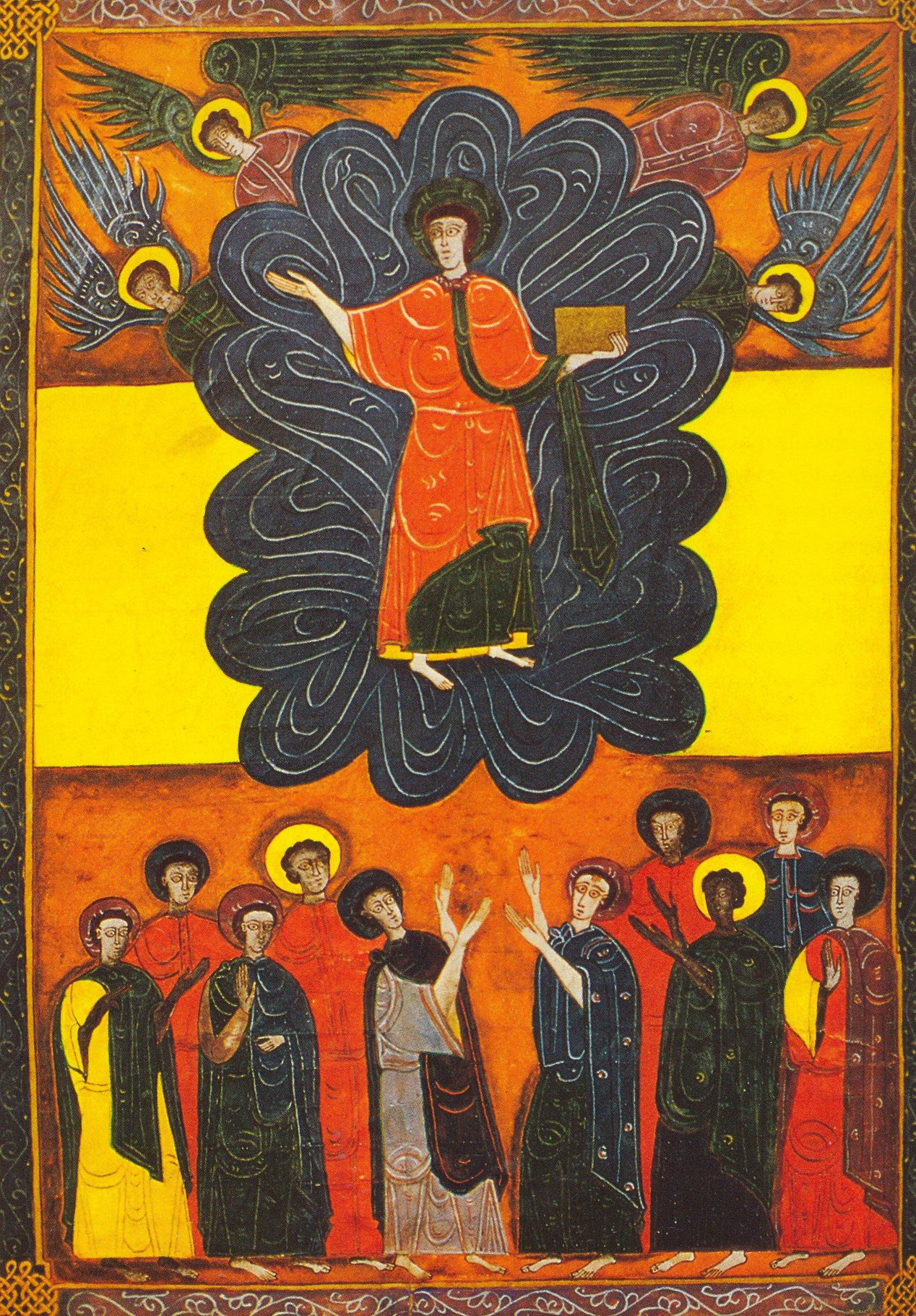
Facundus Beatus, f°43v, The great Theophany

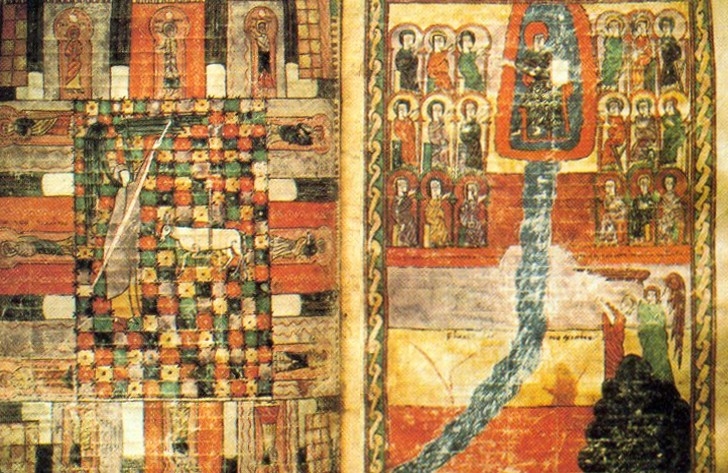
Urgell Beatus, f°198v–199 The new Jerusalem, the river of life

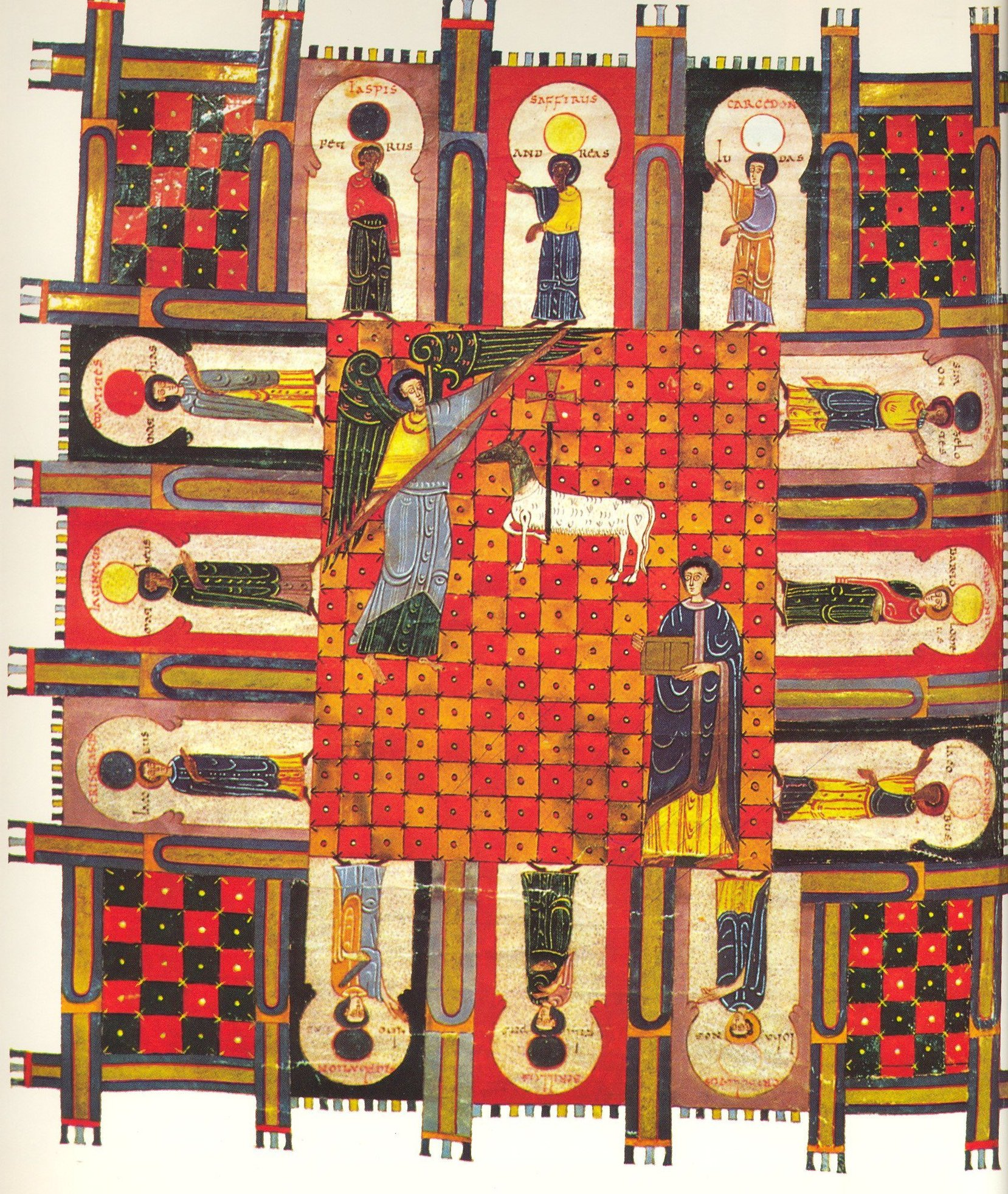
Facundus Beatus, f°253v The new Jerusalem

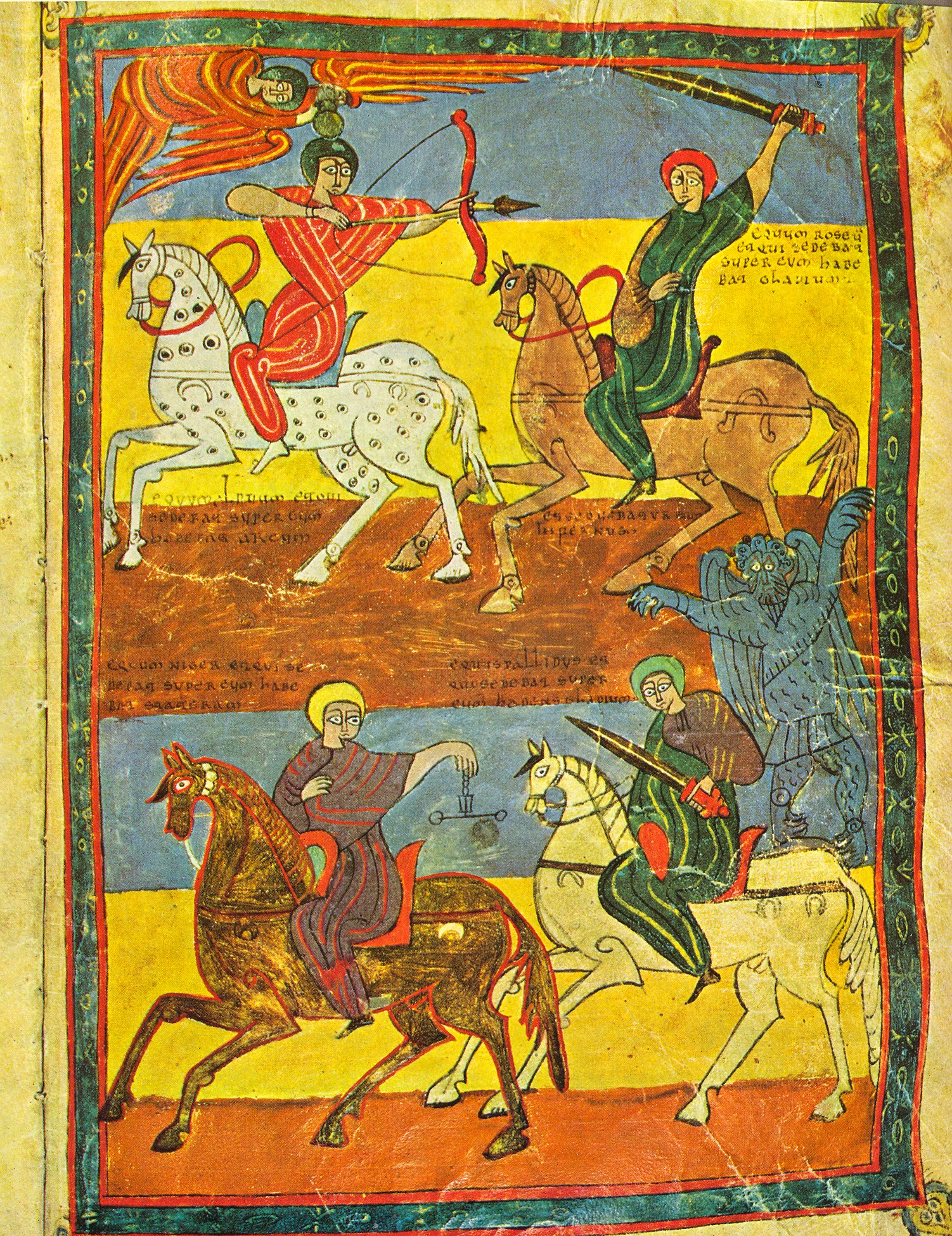
Beatus de Valladolid, f°93 The four horsemen

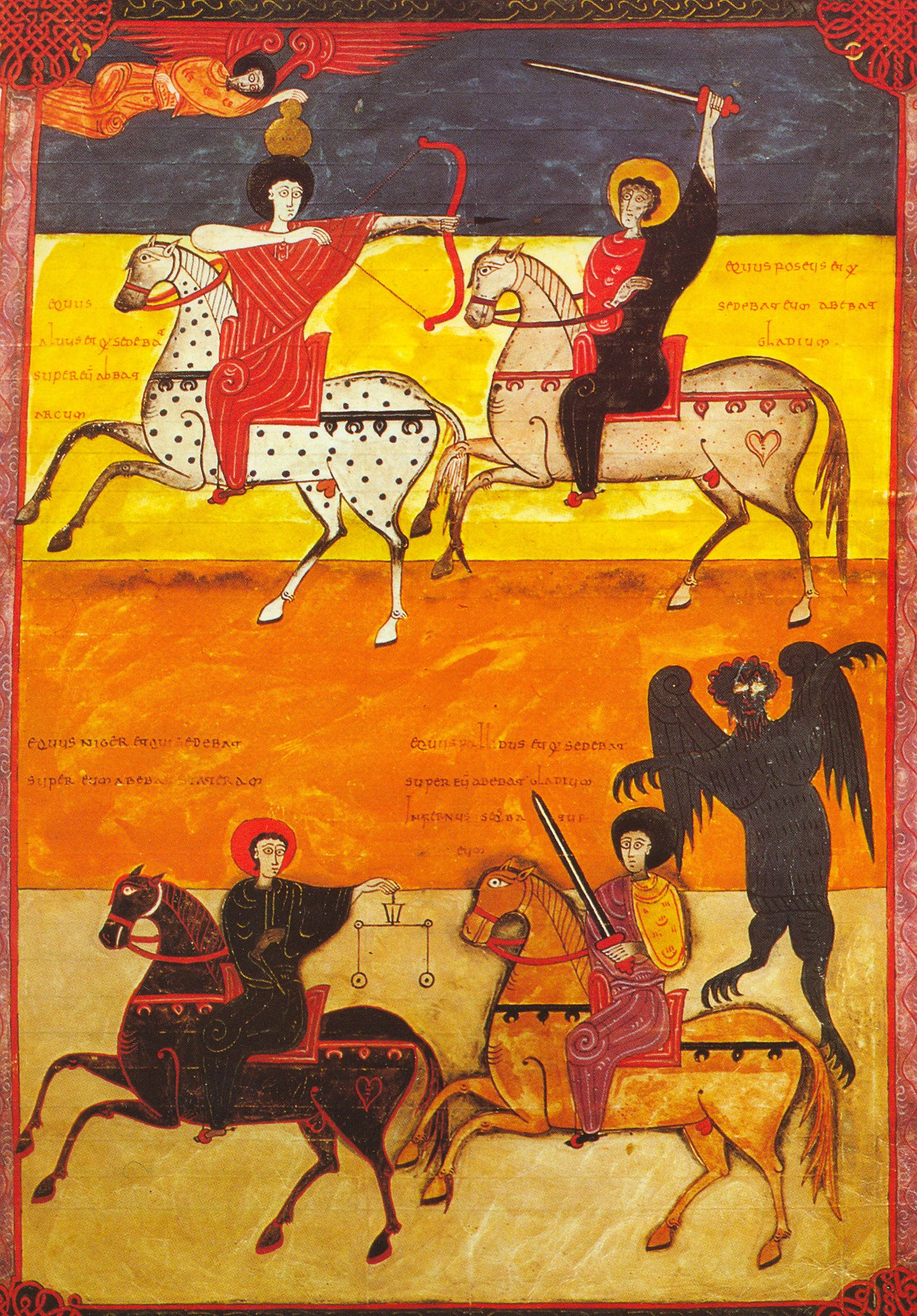
Facundus Beatus, f°135 The four horsemen

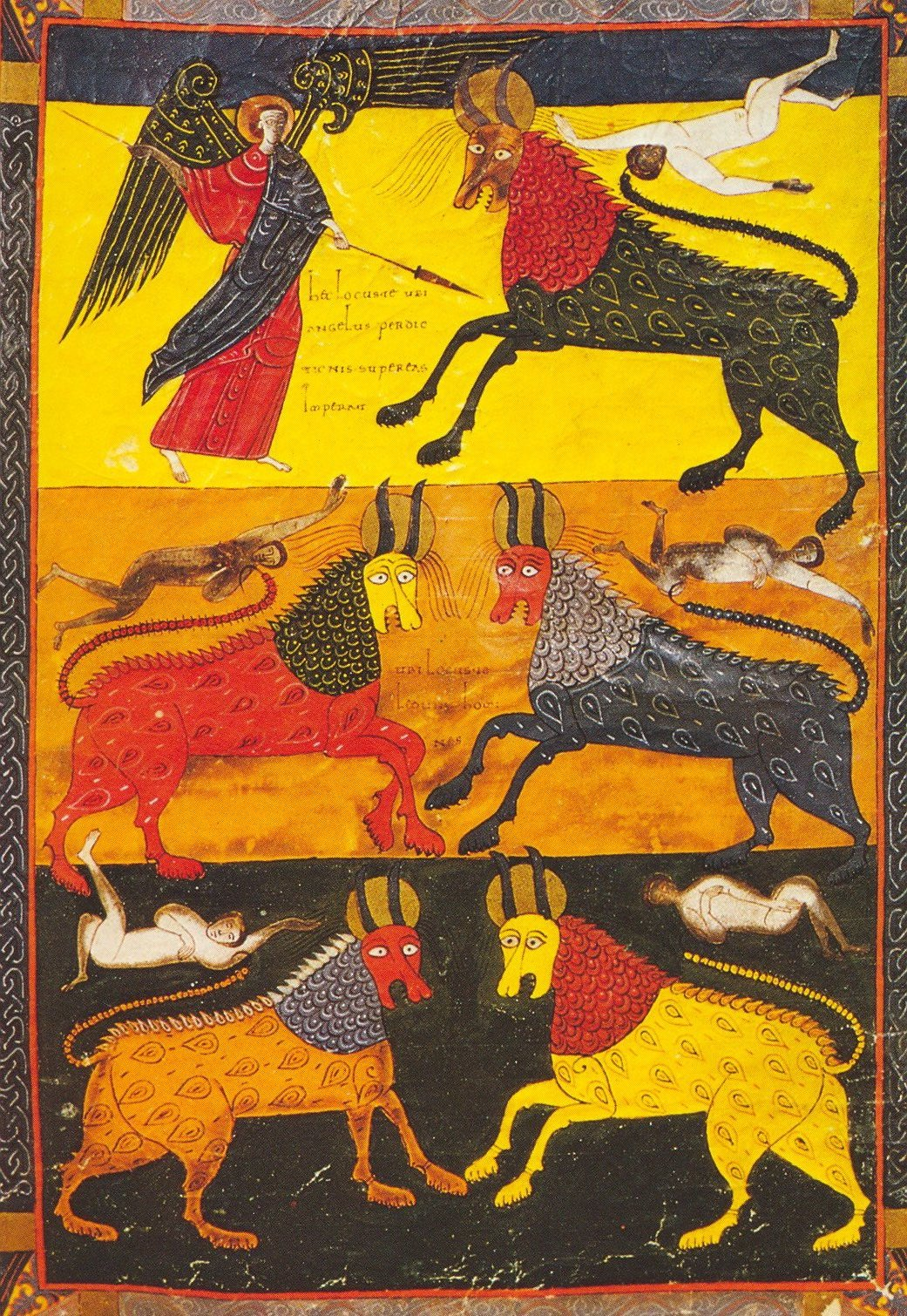
Facundus Beatus, f°171v The monstrous beasts

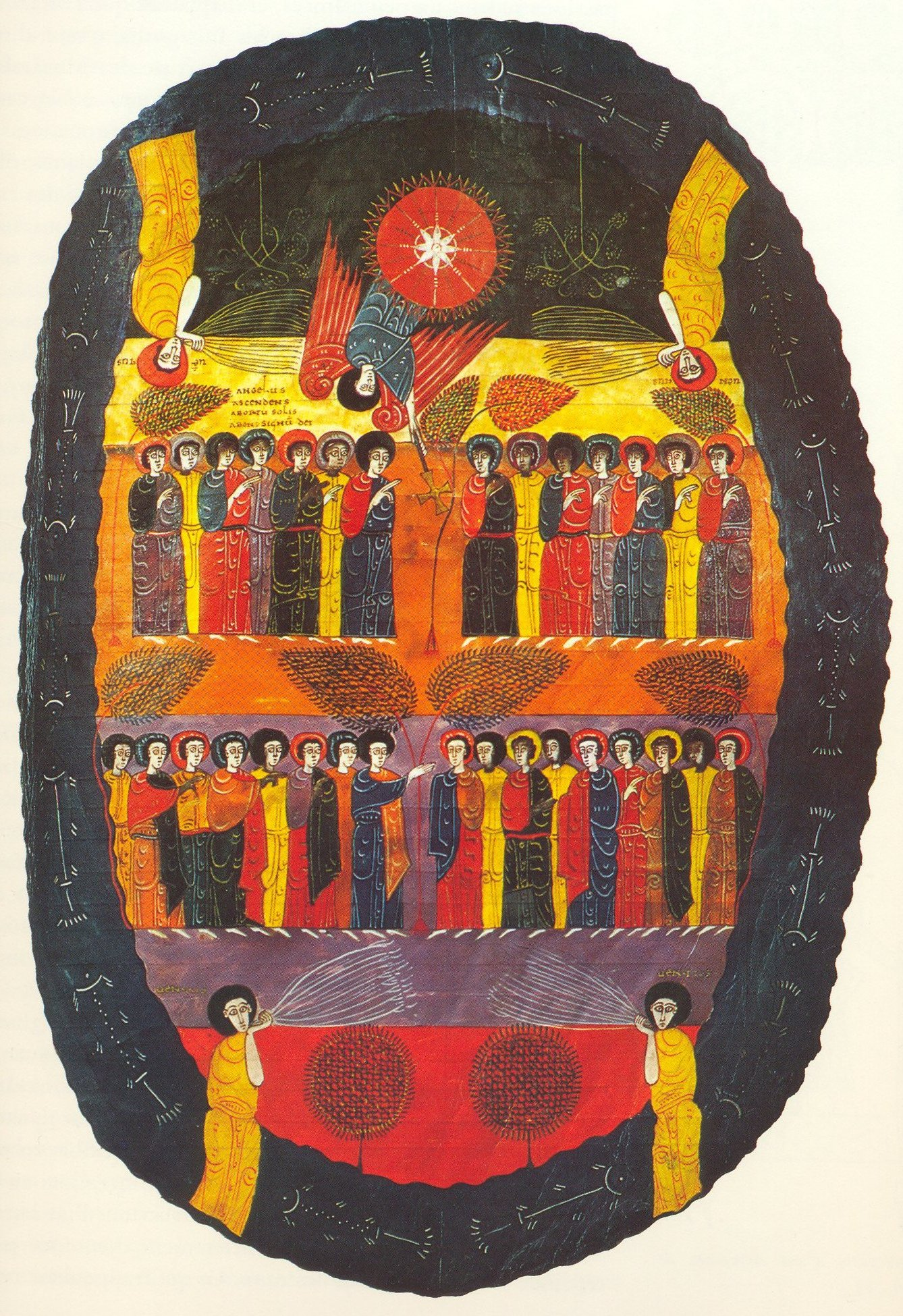
Facundus Beatus, f°145 The elect and the angels restraining the winds

== Printed editions ==
- Commentarius in Apocalypsin. Ed. Henry A. Sanders. Papers and monographs of the American Academy in Rome 7 (Rome: American Academy in Rome, 1930). The first critical edition of the commentary. Latin.
- Beati Liebanensis Tractatus de Apocalipsin. Ed. Roger Gryson. Corpus Christianorum: Series Latina 107 B-C (Turnhout: Brepols, 2012). Two volumes of a new, improved and up-to-date critical edition of the commentary's text. Latin and French.
- Commentary on the Apocalypse - Part I. Trans. M.S. O'Brien. (2013). English translation of Books I and II. Includes many sources and quotes not noted in Gryson.
