= Urgell Beatus =

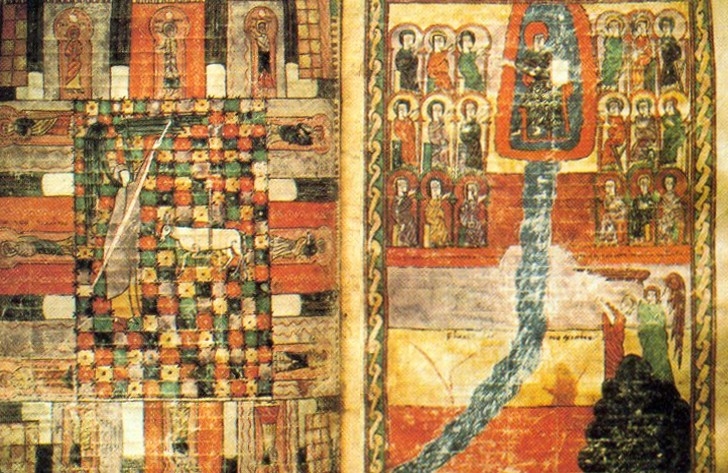
Depiction of the "River of Life" (right), from the Book of Revelation, Urgell Beatus, (f°198v–199), 10th century

The Urgell Beatus, Beatus d'Urgell or Beatus la Seu d'Urgell is a 10th-century illuminated manuscript of the Commentary on the Apocalypse by the 8th-century monk Beatus of Liebana, now in the Musei Diocesá de La Seu d'Urgell, at La Seu d'Urgell, Spain.

== History ==
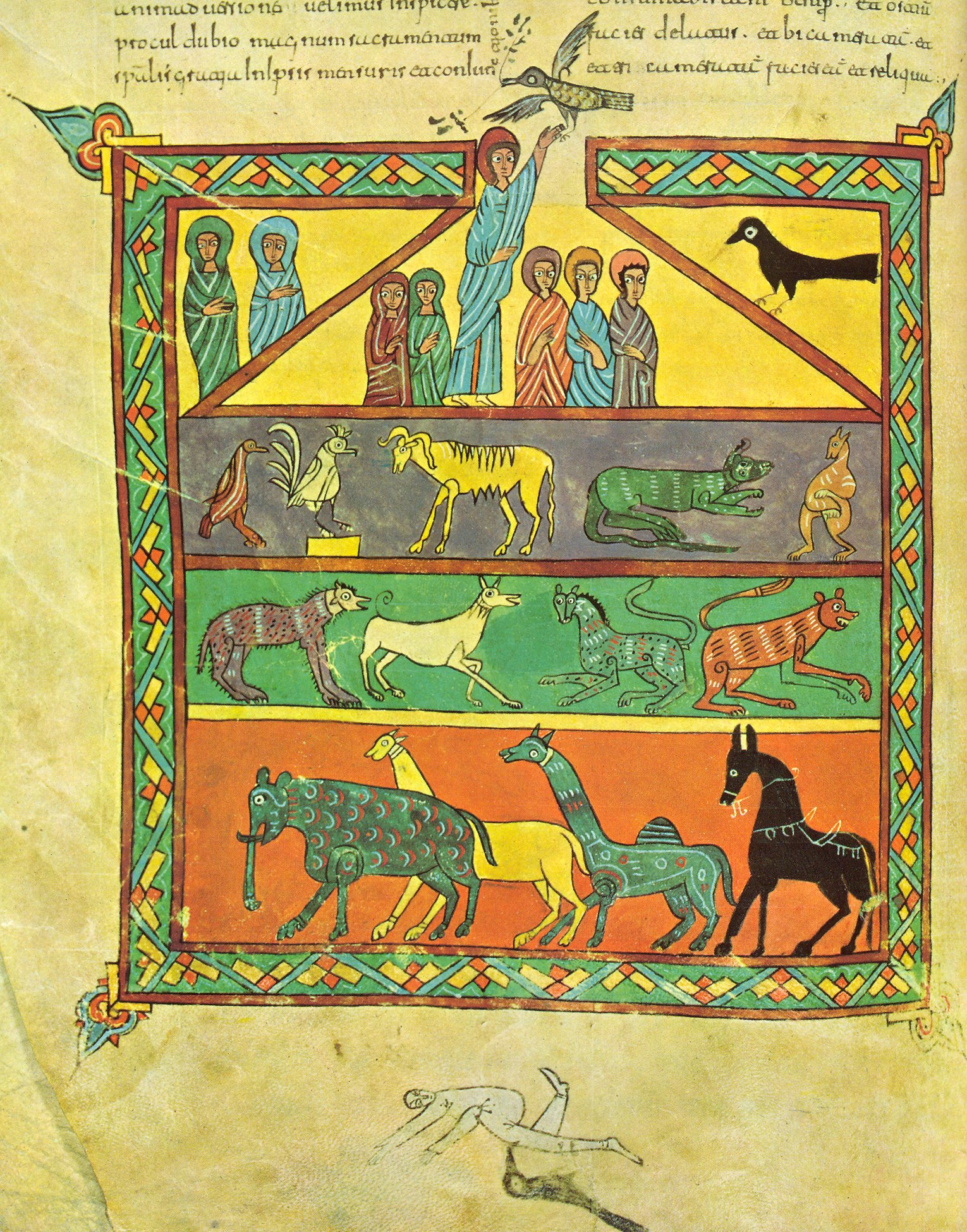
Noah's Ark

Around the year 786 the abbot of the monastery of San Martín de Liebana, Santander, known as Beatus wrote a commentary on Book of Revelation. This was made into many copies, mostly in Iberia, of which some 27 illustrated copies survive. Among these codices, usually just called a "Beatus", one of the most beautiful and complete examples is the Urgell Beatus.

It now consists of seven pages numbered with Roman numerals and another 243 pages with Arabic numerals. It contains 79 miniatures. In the first third of the 20th century, it was studied by technicians as prestigious as HA Sanders, W Nieves and Mn. Pere Pujol, archivist of the Cathedral, all of which have tried to emphasize paleographic interest and artistic importance of the codex and clarify any issues of bibliographic fact. Unlike some other surviving Beatus MS, it carries no indication of its place of origin and date, so it is impossible to identify the calligraphers and miniaturists. Many specialists consider it came from the monastery of La Rioja, towards the end of the 10th century.

There are 12 illustrations included in the preliminary pages, then 67 in the Apocalypse Commentary itself, with a further 11 illustrating Jerome's Commentary on the Book of Daniel, and more illustrating the genealogy of Christ. These two texts were often included in Beatus manuscripts by this date.

On 29 September 1996, two members of an organized gang of art thieves stole the Beatus after cutting the power and breaking the window of the museum. This group was caught in Valencia on 21 January 1997, among other works of art the police recovered the intact Beatus.

== Cultural references ==
- Sample images including stamp issued in 1975 by Spain's postal service corresponding to Beatus 72nd miniature.
