= San Salvador de Tábara Monastery =

Monastery in Tábara, Spain

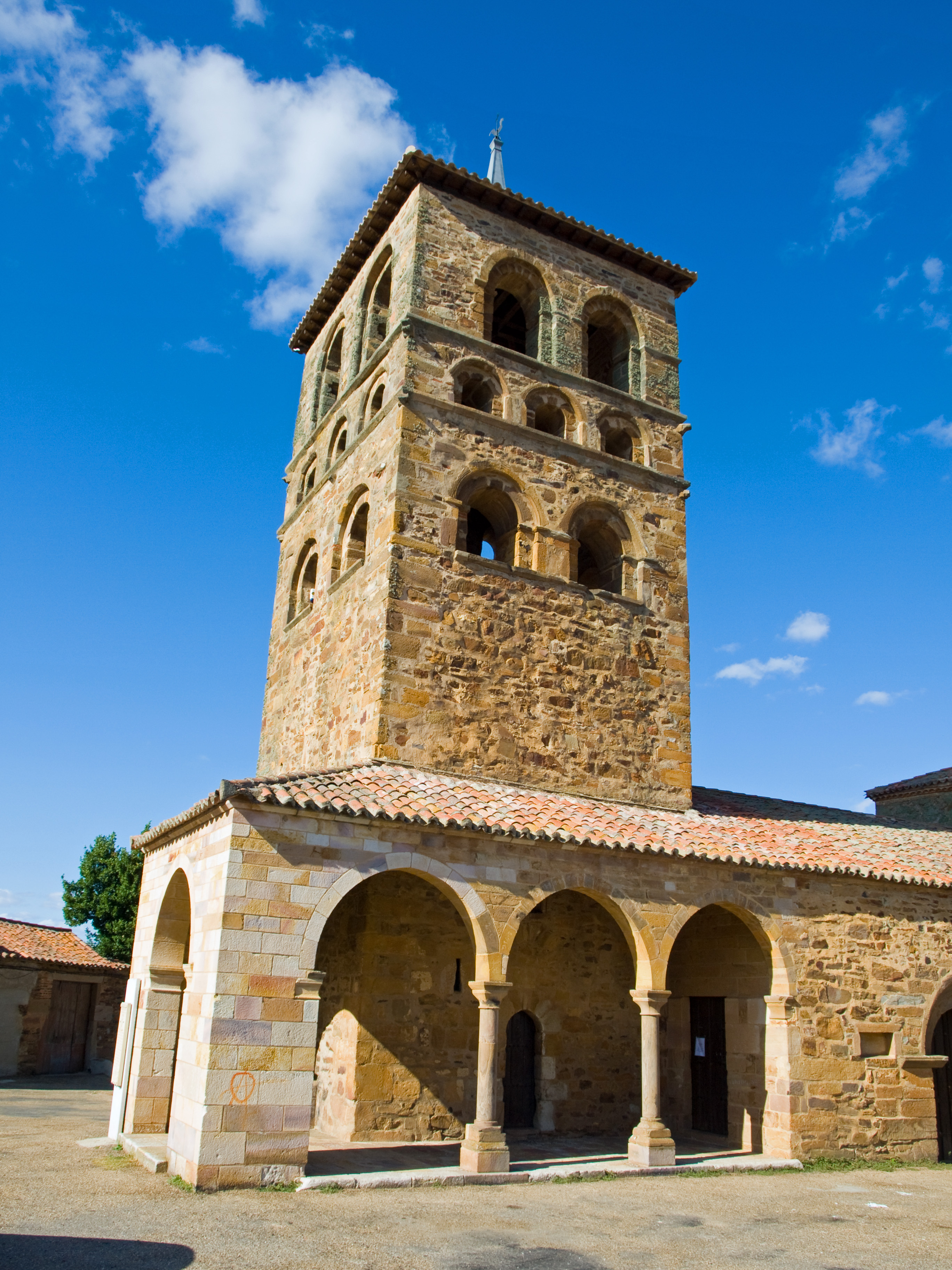
Romanesque tower of the monastery.

San Salvador de Tábara Monastery was a monastery in the town of Tábara, Province of Zamora, Spain. It was founded at the end of the 9th century after Alfonso III of Asturias's victory at the battle of Polvoraria.

Its 12th-century tower survives, now part of the church of Santa Maria. The monastery is notable as the home of the scriptorium which produced the Tábara Beatus, Morgan Beatus and Gerona Beatus.

== Sources ==
- Carlos R. Lafora, Andanzas en torno al legado mozárabe, Ediciones Encuentro, Madrid, 1991, p. 105-107.
