= John Williams (art historian) =

American art historian

- Born: John W. Williams; February 25, 1928
- Died: June 6, 2015 (aged 87)

Academic background
- Education: University of Michigan

Academic work
- Discipline: Art history
- Institutions: University of Pittsburgh
- Main interests: Spanish medieval art

John W. Williams (February 25, 1928 – June 6, 2015) was an American art historian who was an expert in Spanish medieval art, especially its illuminated manuscripts. He was Andrew W. Mellon Professor of History of Art and Architecture end eventually Professor Emeritus, Medieval Art and Architecture, both at the University of Pittsburgh.

Williams's best known work is The Illustrated Beatus, a five-volume work. It was turned into the documentary film Beatus: The Spanish Apocalypse.
