= Divisiones Regionales de Fútbol in Asturias =

The Divisiones Regionales de Fútbol in the Community of Asturias, organized by Real Federación de Fútbol del Principado de Asturias:

- Primera Asturfútbol, formerly Regional Preferente de Asturias and Primera RFFPA (Level 6 of the Spanish football pyramid)
- Segunda Asturfútbol, formerly Primera Regional de Asturias and Segunda RFFPA (Level 7)
- Tercera Asturfútbol, formerly Segunda Regional de Asturias and Tercera RFFPA (Level 8)

== Primera Asturfútbol ==
Primera Asturfútbol
- Founded: 1978
- Country: Spain
- Number of clubs: 20 (18 for the 2027-28 season)
- Level on pyramid: 6
- Promotion to: 3ª Federación – Group 2
- Relegation to: Segunda Asturfútbol
- Domestic cup(s): Copa del Rey, Copa Asturfutbol
- Current champions: Real Sporting de Gijón C
- Website: Official website

Primera Asturfútbol is the first level of the Asturian local football league system. All of the clubs are based in the Principality of Asturias.

=== The League ===
The league consists of 20 teams in one group. At the end of the season, three teams are promoted to Tercera Federación – Group 2. The last four classified are relegated to Segunda Asturfútbol (formerly Primera Regional de Asturias and Segunda RFFPA). However, this 2026-27 season six teams will relegate to Segunda Asturfútbol, as Primera Asturfútbol will reduce its size from 20 to 18 teams for the 2027-28 season.

For the current 2026–27 season, the current champions, Real Sporting de Gijón C, will play in Primera Asturfútbol for fourth season in a row, as they did not promote due to Sporting Atlético has a place in Tercera Federación – Group 2.

From the 2018–19 to the 2020–21 season, the champion of the league qualified for the Copa del Rey. Then, from the 2021–22 to the 2024–25 season was the best non-promoted team to Tercera Federación – Group 2 which qualified for the Copa del Rey. Since the past 2025–26 season, the winner of Copa Asturfútbol is the team that qualifies for the Copa del Rey. Copa Asturfútbol is a 12-team preseason tournament, created by the Real Federación de Fútbol del Principado de Asturias in Summer 2025.

=== Former names ===
- Regional Preferente 1978–2022
- Primera RFFPA 2022–23

=== 2026–27 teams ===
2026–27 Primera Asturfútbol teams
Teams in Gijón/Xixón city: Sporting C, TSK Roces
Teams in Oviedo/Uviéu city: Pumarín, Universidad de Oviedo, Vallobín

Team	City
Candás CF	Candás, Carreño
CD Tineo	Tineo/Tinéu
CD Tuilla	Tiuya/Tuilla, Llangréu/Langreo
CD Universidad de Oviedo	Oviedo/Uviéu
CD Vallobín	Vallobín, Oviedo/Uviéu
Club de Campo La Fresneda	Urbanización La Fresneda, Siero
Club Europa de Nava	Nava
Club Hispano	Piedrasblancas, Castrillón
Nalón CF	Olloniego/Lluniego, Oviedo/Uviéu
Puerto de Vega CF	Puerto de Vega/Veiga, Navia
Pumarín CF	Pumarín, Oviedo/Uviéu
Real Avilés Industrial CF B	Avilés
Real Sporting de Gijón C	Gijón/Xixón
Real Titánico	La Pola Llaviana/Pola de Laviana, Laviana/Llaviana
Ribadesella CF	Ribadesella/Ribeseya
SD Lenense	La Pola, Lena/Ḷḷena
SD Navarro CF	Valliniello/Navarro, Avilés
TSK Roces	Roces, Gijón/Xixón
UD San Claudio	San Claudio/San Cloyo, Oviedo/Uviéu
Valdesoto CF	Valdesoto, Siero

=== Latest promoted teams ===
Season	Champion	Runner-up	Other promoted teams
1985–86	Club Asturias de Blimea	UC Ceares	El Entrego CD, CA Lugones, Pumarín CF, Europa de Nava, Deportiva Piloñesa
1986–87	Cánicas AC	CD Tuilla	Luarca CF
1987–88	CD Praviano	Real Titánico	Ribadesella CF
1988–89	Navia CF	Santiago de Aller CF	AD Ribadedeva
1989–90	Candás CF	AD Universidad de Oviedo	UD Gijón Industrial, CD Lealtad
1990–91	CD Tuilla	Club Astur	UD San Martín, Lada Langreo CF
1991–92	Deportiva Piloñesa	Club Europa de Nava	SD Lenense
1992–93	SD Navarro CF	CD San Martín	Berrón CF, Valdesoto CF
1993–94	AD Universidad de Oviedo	CD Praviano	CD Tuilla
1994–95	CD Mosconia	SD Colloto	Valdesoto CF
1995–96	Santiago de Aller CF	CD Tuilla	SD Narcea, Candás CF, Astur CF
1996–97	Deportiva Piloñesa	CD Praviano	Andés CF
1997–98	CD Mosconia	CD Covadonga	Club Europa de Nava, CD Trasona
1998–99	CD Llanes	Astur CF	CD Turón
1999–00	Pumarín CF	CD Trasona	Valdesoto CF, CD Covadonga
2000–01	SD Narcea	SDR San Lázaro	Condal CF, SD Navarro CF
2001–02	Club Hispano	UD Gijón Industrial	CD Covadonga
2002–03	UC Ceares	CD San Martín	SD Lenense
2003–04	SD Navarro CF	Andés CF	Berrón CF
2004–05	Real Tapia CF	Condal CF	CD Tuilla, CD Covadonga
2005–06	CD Llanes	CD Cudillero	CD San Martín, CD Praviano
2006–07	SD Colloto	Real Tapia CF	Candás CF
2007–08	CD Mosconia	Nalón CF	UD Gijón Industrial, CD Covadonga
2008–09	CD Praviano	SD Colloto	Luarca CF
2009–10	Navia CF	Nalón CF	Real Oviedo B, Andés CF
2010–11	CD Covadonga	SD Colloto	Pumarín CF
2011–12	CD Praviano	Atlético Lugones SD	L'Entregu CF, Urraca CF, Real Tapia CF
2012–13	Real Avilés CF B	SD Lenense	Andés CF
2013–14	TSK Roces	CD Llanes	Astur CF, CD Mosconia
2014–15	Club Siero	CD Colunga	CD Tineo
2015–16	L'Entregu CF	UD Llanera	SD Lenense
2016–17	TSK Roces	UD Gijón Industrial	EI San Martín, Valdesoto CF
2017–18	UD San Claudio	CD La Madalena de Morcín	CD Universidad de Oviedo
2018–19	Urraca CF	CD Vallobín	SD Navarro CF, SD Lenense
2019–20	Real Titánico	Avilés Stadium CF	Valdesoto CF
2020–21	Luarca CF	TSK Roces	UP Langreo B
2021–22	Avilés Stadium CF and Valdesoto CF		Condal CF
2022–23	Urraca CF	UD Gijón Industrial	SD Lenense, Barcia CF
2023–24	Real Sporting de Gijón C (Note: Sporting C did not promote due to Sporting Atlético had a place in Tercera Federación.)	EI San Martín	CD Mosconia, TSK Roces
2024–25	Real Sporting de Gijón C	Club Siero	CD Llanes, SD Navarro CF, UD Gijón Industrial
2025–26	Real Sporting de Gijón C	Condal CF	Astur CF, Andés CF

=== Copa Asturfútbol ===
With the aim to determine the Asturian representative at the Copa del Rey, prior to each season the Copa Asturfútbol is played.

Created in Summer 2025, the three relegated teams from the previous Tercera Federación – Group 2 season and the best nine non-promoted teams qualify in order to play this tournament. Reserve teams are not allowed to play.

==== List of finals ====
Season	Venue	Winners	Runners-up	Score
2025	La Veigona, Luarca/Ḷḷuarca	Puerto de Vega CF	Astur CF	2–1
2026	La Ferrota, Piedrasblancas	Ribadesella CF	Real Titánico	4–1

== Segunda Asturfútbol ==
Segunda Asturfútbol
- Country: Spain
- Number of clubs: 36; two groups of 18
- Level on pyramid: 7
- Promotion to: Primera Asturfútbol
- Relegation to: Tercera Asturfútbol
- Domestic cup: None
- Current champions: Nalón CF
- Website: Official website

Segunda Asturfútbol is the second level of the Asturian local football league system. It is administered by the Real Federación de Fútbol del Principado de Asturias.

=== League format ===
The league is played in two groups of 18 teams each. At the end of the season, the two champions are promoted with the two winners of promotion playoff's semifinals (four teams in total). On the other hand, three clubs in each group are relegated to Tercera Asturfútbol (six in total). However, this 2026-27 season each group will suffer an extra relegation (eight teams in total), as Primera Asturfútbol will reduce its size from 20 to 18 teams for the 2027-28 season.

=== Former names ===
- Primera Regional until 1973
- Segunda Regional Preferente 1973–1978
- Primera Regional 1978–2022
- Segunda RFFPA 2022–2023

=== 2025–26 teams ===
2026–27 Segunda Asturfútbol teams (Group 1)
Teams in Oviedo/Uviéu city: EF Real Oviedo, Grujoan, La Corredoria
2026–27 Segunda Asturfútbol teams (Group 2)
Teams in Gijón/Xixón city: Asunción, Codema, Fabril, Manuel Rubio, Triple A
Teams in Llangréu/Langreo municipality: Lada Langreo, Langreo B

==== Group 1 ====
Team	Location
Barcia CF	Barcia, Valdés
CDB Cornellana	Cornellana/Corniana, Salas
CD Grujoan	Pumarín, Oviedo/Uviéu
CD Mosconia B	Grau/Grado
CD Muros Balompié	Muros de Nalón/Muros
CD Praviano B	Pravia
CD Treviense	Trevías, Valdés
Escuela de Fútbol Real Oviedo	Oviedo/Uviéu
Gozón CF	Lluanco/Luanco, Gozón
Luarca CF	Luarca/Ḷḷuarca, Valdés
Marítimo Racing Club	L'Arena, Soto del Barco/Sotu'l Barcu
Navia CF	Navia
Real Juvencia	Trubia, Oviedo/Uviéu
SD Narcea	Cangas del Narcea/Cangas
SDCR La Corredoria	La Corredoria, Oviedo/Uviéu
Siderúrgico CF	Llaranes, Avilés
Unión Comercial	Veguín, Oviedo/Uviéu
Vegadeo CF	A Veiga/Vegadeo

==== Group 2 ====
Team	Location
Asunción CF	Gijón/Xixón
Atlético de Lugones SD	Lugones/Llugones, Siero
Cánicas Athletic Club	Cangues d'Onís/Cangas de Onís
CD La Madalena de Morcín	Santolaya, Morcín
CD Lealtad B	Villaviciosa
CD Manuel Rubio	Ceares/Ciares, Gijón/Xixón
CD San Jorge	Nueva, Llanes
CD Turón	Turón, Mieres
Club Asturias de Blimea	Blimea, SMRA/Samartín del Rei Aurelio
Codema Fútbol	Gijón/Xixón
Condal CF B	Noreña
Fabril CD	Jove/Xove, Gijón/Xixón
Lada Langreo CF	Lada, Llangréu/Langreo
SD Atlético Camocha	La Camocha, Gijón/Xixón
SD Colloto	Colloto/Cualloto, Siero
Triple A Gijón	Gijón/Xixón
UD Sariego CF	Vega, Sariego/Sariegu
UP Langreo B	Llangréu/Langreo

=== Last champions ===
In bold, champion in the seasons that there was a final between the group winners.

Season	Group 1	Group 2	Group 3
1991–92	Villapedre CF		
1992–93	SD Narcea		
1993–94	Quintueles CF		
1994–95	Real Tapia CF		
1995–96	CD Covadonga		
1996–97	Condal Club		
1997–98	Salas CD		
1998–99	Santo Tomás CF		
1999–00	SDR San Lázaro		
2000–01	CD Villaverde-Careñes		
2001–02	UC Ceares		
2002–03	CD Cudillero		
2003–04	Deportiva Piloñesa		
2004–05	CD Praviano		
2005–06	Urraca CF	La Caridad CF	
2006–07	L'Entregu CF	Atlético de Lugones SD	
2007–08	Unión Comercial CF	Racing de Sama CF	
2008–09	Deportiva Piloñesa	Real Oviedo B	
2009–10	Real Avilés Industrial CF B	SCD Campomanes	
2010–11	CD Roces	Real Tapia CF	
2011–12	CD Muros Balompié	Astur CF	
2012–13	CD Rayo Carbayín	Boal CF	
2013–14	La Madalena de Morcín CF	UD San Claudio	
2014–15	CC La Fresneda	Nalón CF	
2015–16	CD Muros Balompié	Ribadesella CF	
2016–17	Real Titánico	CD Vallobín	
2017–18	Berrón CF	Avilés Stadium CF	
2018–19	Unión Comercial CF	Llaranes CF	
2019–20	CD Langreo Eulalia	Luarca CF	
2020–21	**AD Ribadedeva** (Note: Season played in a short-term, with eight groups where winners played a promotion play-off.)		
2021–22	Ribadesella CF	CD Universidad de Oviedo	CD Muros Balompié
2022–23	CC La Fresneda	**Club Siero**	
2023–24	CD Turón	**Puerto de Vega CF**	
2024–25	Club Europa de Nava	**Club Hispano**	
2025–26	Real Avilés Industrial CF B	**Nalón CF**	

== Tercera Asturfútbol ==
Tercera Asturfútbol
- Country: Spain
- Number of clubs: 67; two groups of 16, one group of 18, one group of 17
- Level on pyramid: 8
- Promotion to: Segunda Asturfútbol
- Domestic cup: None
- Website: Official website

Tercera Asturfútbol is the third level of the Asturian local football league system. It is also administered by the Real Federación de Fútbol del Principado de Asturias.

=== League format ===
The league is played in four groups: two groups are made up by 16 teams, one group is made up by 18 teams and the fourth group is made up by 17 teams. At the end of the season, the four champions are promoted to Segunda Asturfútbol with the two winners of promotion playoff (six teams in total).

For the current 2026–27 season, twelve new teams join Tercera Asturfútbol: UD Belmonte 2026 replaces CD Belmonte, Peñamellera Baja/El Valle Baju de Peñamellera recover the football after 15 years thanks to CD Peñamellera, and there are two newly created clubs: Posada 1949, which was founded after the dissolution of Urraca CF in October 2025; and Club Rayo Mercadín, based in the neighbourhood of Ventanielles, Oviedo/Uviéu. In Gijón/Xixón, CD Atlantic de Gijón returns to compite after a year and CD San Julián de Roces has created a senior squad. In addition, there are six new reserve teams (Barcia CF B, Berrón CF B, Caudal Deportivo B, Escuela de Fútbol Real Oviedo B, Real Juvencia B and SD Lenense B). On the other hand, seven teams do not play the current season: Atlético de Siero, the mentioned CD Belmonte, Grupo Deportivo Bosco, Independiente CF, L'Entregu CF B, Llaranes CF B and San Fernando CF (farm team of Avilés Stadium CF).

As a curiosity, Berrón CF has two teams playing in Tercera Asturfútbol this current season: the main team plays in the Group 2 and its reserve team plays in the Group 4.

=== Former names ===
- Segunda Regional until 2022
- Tercera RFFPA 2022–23

=== 2026–27 teams ===
2026–27 Tercera Asturfútbol teams (Group 1)
Teams in Gijón/Xixón city: Gijón Perchera, La Braña, Lloreda, Marina Norte, Montevil,
Rayo Gijonés, San Julián de Roces, Unión Astur

Group 1

Team	Location
AD Lloreda	Tremañes, Gijón/Xixón
AD Ribadedeva	Colombres, Ribadedeva/Ribedeva
Argüero CF	Argüeru, Villaviciosa
CD Atlantic de Gijón	La Providencia, Gijón/Xixón
CD Gijón Perchera FS	Perchera-La Braña, Gijón/Xixón
CD La Braña	Perchera-La Braña, Gijón/Xixón
CD Montevil	Montevil, Gijón/Xixón
CD Peñamellera	Panes, Peñamellera Baja/El Valle Baju de Peñamellera
CD San Julián de Roces	Roces, Gijón/Xixón
CF Estudiantes	Somió, Gijón/Xixón
Club Arenas del Sella	Arriondas/Les Arriondes, Parres
Deportiva Piloñesa	L'Infiestu, Piloña
Fortuna CF	Villamayor, Piloña
Marina Norte Gijón Sports Club	Gijón/Xixón
Posada 1949	Posada, Llanes
Quintueles CF	Quintueles, Villaviciosa
Rayo Gijonés	Gijón/Xixón
Unión Astur CF	Gijón/Xixón

Group 2

2026–27 Tercera Asturfútbol teams (Group 2)
Teams in Oviedo/Uviéu city: Atlético de La Florida, EF Real Oviedo B, Grisú,
Guillén Lafuerza, Oviedo City, Rayo Mercadín, Rosal

Team	Location
AD Guillén Lafuerza	El Rancho, Oviedo/Uviéu
Berrón CF	El Berrón, Siero
CD La Manjoya	La Manxoya, Oviedo/Uviéu
Céltic de Puerto FC	Puerto, Oviedo/Uviéu
Centro Asturiano de Oviedo	Ules, Oviedo/Uviéu
Club Atlético de La Florida	La Florida, Oviedo/Uviéu
Club de Campo La Fresneda B	Urbanización La Fresneda, Siero
Club Rayo Mercadín	Ventanielles, Oviedo/Uviéu
Club Siero B	La Pola Siero, Siero
Colegio San Ignacio	Llatores, Oviedo/Uviéu
Escuela de Fútbol Real Oviedo B	Oviedo/Uviéu
Grisú CF	Cerdeño, Oviedo/Uviéu
Oviedo City FC	Oviedo/Uviéu
Real Juvencia B	Trubia, Oviedo/Uviéu
Rosal CF	Oviedo/Uviéu
SD Colloto B	Colloto/Cualloto, Siero

Group 3

2026–27 Tercera Asturfútbol teams (Group 3)
Teams in Castrillón: Hispano B, Pillarno, Raíces

Team	Location
Barcia CF B	Barcia, Valdés
Boal CF	Boal/Bual
CD Los Campos	Trasona/Tresona, Corvera de Asturias/Corvera
CD Marino de Cudillero	Cudillero/Cuideiru
CD Pillarno	Piarnu, Castrillón
CD Raíces	Raíces Nuevo/La Fundición, Castrillón
CF Versalles	Versalles, Avilés
Club Hispano B	Piedrasblancas, Castrillón
La Caridad CF	A Caridá, El Franco
Llaranes CF	Llaranes, Avilés
Podes CF	Samartín de Podes, Gozón
Real Tapia CF	Tapia de Casariego
Salas CD	Salas
UD Belmonte 2026	Belmonte/Balmonte, Belmonte de Miranda/Miranda
UD Castros	Mouguías, Coaña/Cuaña
UD La Espina	La Espina, Salas

Group 4

2026–27 Tercera Asturfútbol teams (Group 4)
Teams in Aller/Ayer: Ayer CF, Santiago de Aller
Teams in Llangréu/Langreo municipality: Colegio Riaño, Lada Langreo B, San Luis
Teams in Mieres: Caudal B, Santa Marina

Team	Location
Ayer CF	Caborana, Aller/Ayer
Berrón CF B	El Berrón, Siero
Caudal Deportivo B	Mieres del Camín, Mieres
CD Riosa	L'Ará, Riosa
CD San Luis	La Nueva, Llangréu/Langreo
CD Santa Marina de Mieres	Ablaña, Mieres
Club Europa de Nava B	Nava
Club Santiago de Aller	Morea/Moreda, Aller/Ayer
CN Riaño CF	Riañu, Llangréu/Langreo
Cultural Deportiva de Aboño	Aboño, Carreño
Iberia CF	Santuyano/San Julián, Bimenes
Lada Langreo CF B	Lada, Llangréu/Langreo
Rayo Carbayín CF	Santa Marta Carbayín, Siero
Real Titánico B	La Pola Llaviana/Pola de Laviana, Laviana/Llaviana
SCD Campomanes	Campumanes, Lena/Ḷḷena
SD Lenense B	La Pola, Lena/Ḷḷena
UD Llanera B	Posada, Llanera

== Regional Asturfutfem (formerly Femenino Regional and Primera Asturfutfem) ==
Regional Asturfutfem
- Country: Spain
- Number of clubs: 15
- Level on pyramid: 5
- Promotion to: Tecera Federación FUTFEM – Group 2
- Current champions: Real Sporting de Gijón C
- Website: Official website

Regional Asturfutfem is the only level of the Asturian local women's football league system. All the clubs are based in the autonomous community of Asturias. It is the fifth level according to the Spanish football league system. For the current 2026–27 season, Tercera Federación FUTFEM is expanded from 10 to 12 teams on each group (as it works similar to the men's league Tercera Federación, there are 18 groups as well): this provokes that the two champions of each group in Segunda Asturfutfem (Inter Gijón CD and L'Entregu CF) promoted two tiers in a row. Fortuna CF-Global Atac was the promoted team from Primera Asturfutfem, as the top four teams were reserve teams (Real Sporting de Gijón C, Real Oviedo Femenino C, Gijón FF B and UD Llanera B).

=== The league ===
Former league Femenino Regional de Asturias was split in two new competitions: Primera Asturfutfem (fifth tier) and Segunda Asturfutfem (sixth tier). For the current 2026-27 season, Regional Asturfutfem will be the only level of the Asturian local women's football league system, as a new youth competition (FuturAst) replaces Segunda Asturfutfem.

=== 2026–27 teams ===
2026–27 Regional Asturfutfem teams
Teams in Gijón/Xixón city: Cimadevilla, Gijón B, Portuarios, Rayo Gijonés B

Team	Location
CD Llanes	Llanes
CD Villa de Pravia	Pravia
CF Llosalín	Güeñu/Bueño, Ribera de Arriba/La Ribera
CF Portuarios de Gijón	Gijón/Xixón
Cimadevilla CF	Cimavilla, Gijón/Xixón
Club Hispano B	Piedrasblancas, Castrillón
Club Victoria	Perlora, Carreño
Deportiva Piloñesa	L'Infiestu, Piloña
FC Internacional Monteverde	Oviedo/Uviéu
Gijón FF B	Gijón/Xixón
La Caridad CF	A Caridá, El Franco
Puerto de Vega CF	Puerto de Vega/Veiga, Navia
Rayo Gijonés B	Gijón/Xixón
SD Colloto	Colloto/Cualloto, Siero
UD Llanera B	Posada, Llanera

=== Latest seasons ===
In bold, champions and runners-up that promoted to former Primera Nacional/current Tercera Federación FUTFEM – Group 2.

Season	Champion	Runner-up	Other promoted teams
1987–88	CFF Tradehi	**Puente Castro CF**	
1995–96	CD EF de Mareo	CFF Tradehi B	
1996–97	Luarca CF	CFF Tradehi	
1997–98	CD Praviano	CD Raíces	
1998–99	SE Pravia	CD EF de Mareo B	
1999–00	CD Raíces	CD EF de Mareo B	
2000–01	**Gijón FF**	**CD Raíces**	
2001–02	AD San Juan La Carisa	Oviedo Moderno CF B	
2002–03	**Oviedo Moderno CF B**	CD EF de Mareo B	
2003–04	CD EF de Mareo B	CD Raíces	
2004–05	CD EF de Mareo B	CD Raíces	
2005–06	Gijón FF B	CD EF de Mareo B	
2006–07	Gijón FF B	CF Llosalín	
2007–08	Barcia CF	CD Langreo Femenino	
2008–09	**CD Langreo Femenino**	CD La Braña	
2009–10	**CD La Braña**	Oviedo Moderno CF B	
2010–11	Oviedo Moderno CF B	Real Tapia CF	
2011–12	**CD Femiastur**	CD Oviedo 06	
2012–13	Oviedo Moderno CF B	CD Manuel Rubio	
2013–14	**Oviedo Moderno CF B**	CD Femiastur	
2014–15	**CD Femiastur**	Oviedo Moderno CF C	
2015–16	Oviedo Moderno CF B	**Gijón FF**	
2016–17	Oviedo Moderno CF B	**UD Llanera**	
2017–18	Oviedo Moderno CF B	Real Sporting de Gijón B	
2018–19	**Real Sporting de Gijón B**	**Oviedo Moderno CF B**	
2019–20	Oviedo Moderno CF C (Note: As both Oviedo C and Sporting Gijón C were not eligible, Llanera was the promoted team.)	Real Sporting de Gijón C	
2020–21	Real Sporting de Gijón C	**Versalles CF**	
2021–22	**CD Romanón**	**UD Llanera**	
2022–23	**Real Sporting de Gijón B**	Real Avilés Industrial CF B	
2023–24	**CD Romanón**	Real Avilés Industrial CF B	
2024–25	**Gijón FF**	**UD Llanera**	**CD Frida CFF**, **UD Prados San Julián**, **Real Avilés Industrial CF B**
2025–26	Real Sporting de Gijón C	Real Oviedo Femenino C	**Fortuna CF-Global Atac**

=== Copa Asturfutfem ===
==== List of finals ====
Season	Venue	Winners	Runners-up	Score
2025–2026	Hermanos Antuña, Mieres del Camín	Gijón FF	UD Llanera	1–0

== Segunda Asturfutfem ==
Segunda Asturfutfem
- Country: Spain
- Level on pyramid: 6
- Promotion to: Primera Asturfutfem
- Current champions: Inter Gijón CD
- Website: Official website

Segunda Asturfutfem was the second level of the Asturian local women's football league system since the 2023–24 season until 2026, when it was replaced by FuturAst, a new youth competition. All the clubs were based in the autonomous community of Asturias.

=== The league ===
Former league Femenino Regional de Asturias was split in two new competitions: Primera Asturfutfem (fifth tier, made up by 12 teams) and Segunda Asturfutfem (sixth tier). At the end of the season, the champion of each group (two teams in total) promoted to Primera Asturfutfem, plus those necessary teams for keeping 12 teams in Primera Asturfutfem. The champion of Segunda Asturfutfem was determined in a single game between the champions of each group.

== Primera Astufutsal ==
Primera Asturfutsal
- Country: Spain
- Number of clubs: 16
- Level on pyramid: 5
- Promotion to: Tercera División – Group 5
- Relegation to: Segunda Asturfutsal
- Domestic cup: Copa Principado Sénior Fútbol Sala
- Current champions: Salinas CF
- Website: Official website

Futsal has a strong tradition in the Principality of Asturias, especially in small municipalities that do not have a football team or directly a football pitch, like Castropol, Las Regueras/Les Regueres, Proaza, Quirós, Sobrescobio/Sobrescobiu, Somiedo or Teverga/Teberga. The Real Federación de Fútbol del Principado de Asturias also manages the local futsal competitions. Primera Asturfutsal is the first level of the Asturian local futsal league system. All the clubs are based in the autonomous community of Asturias. It is the fifth level according to the Spanish futsal league system.

=== The league ===
Primera Asturfutsal is made up by 16 teams. At the end of the season, three teams are promoted to Tecera División – Group 5, without any promotion playoff. The last four classified are relegated to Segunda Asturfutsal. The first five teams at the end of the season qualify directly for the Copa Principado Sénior Fútbol Sala.

=== 2026–27 teams ===
2026–27 Primera Asturfutsal teams
Teams in Mieres del Camín: Futsal Mieres, Mieresala

Team	City
5 As FS	Piedrasblancas, Castrillón
Astur E-Bikes Valdredo	Cudillero/Cuideiru
Boliches FS B	Oviedo/Uviéu
CD Gijón Perchera FS	Perchera-La Braña, Gijón/Xixón
Deportivo Laviana FS B	La Pola Llaviana/Pola de Laviana, Laviana/Llaviana
Futsal Mieres	Mieres del Camín, Mieres
Gimnástico de Caborana	Caborana, Aller/Ayer
La Arena FS	L'Arena, Soto del Barco/Sotu'l Barcu
Les Campes de Siero FS	La Pola Siero, Siero
Los Coyanes FS	Rusecu/Rioseco, Sobrescobio/Sobrescobiu
Mieresala	Mieres del Camín, Mieres
Peña Barcelonista Turón	Turón, Mieres
Pichuchos FS	Cangas del Narcea/Cangas
Proaza FS	Proaza
Teverga FS	Samartín, Teverga/Teberga
Villa de Tineo FS	Tineo/Tinéu

=== Copa Principado Sénior Fútbol Sala ===
==== List of finals ====
Season	Venue	Winners	Runners-up	Score
2022	Complejo Deportivo del Campus de Mieres, Mieres del Camín	CD Gijón Playas FS	Les Campes de Siero FS	7–6
2023	Polideportivo de Ventanielles "Hermanos Cecchini", Oviedo/Uviéu	Club Concejo Valdés	La Isla de Siero FS	4–2
2024	Polideportivo Mieres Sur, Mieres del Camín	Avilés Sport FS	Deportivo Laviana FS	5–4
2025	Polideportivo Municipal, La Pola Llaviana/Pola de Laviana	Racing de Mieres FS	Arenas de Manzaneda CD	4–0

== Segunda Astufutsal ==
Segunda Asturfutsal
- Country: Spain
- Number of clubs: 30; two groups of 15
- Level on pyramid: 6
- Promotion to: Primera Asturfutsal
- Domestic cup: Copa Principado Sénior Fútbol Sala
- Current champions: Pichuchos FS
- Website: Official website

Segunda Asturfutsal is the second level of the Asturian local futsal league system. All the clubs are based in the Principality of Asturias.

=== The league ===
Segunda Asturfutsal is made up by 30 teams, divided in two groups. At the end of the season, four teams (the champion and the runner up of each group) are promoted to Primera Asturfutsal, without any promotion playoff. The champion of Segunda Asturfutsal is determined in a single game between the champions of each group. The team that hosts this game is the best qualify team at the end of the league. Three teams (the two group champions and the best runner up) qualify directly for the Copa Principado Sénior Fútbol Sala.

=== 2026–27 teams ===
Group 1

2026–27 Segunda Asturfutsal teams (Group 1)
Teams in Gijón/Xixón city: Gijón Perchera B, Gijón Playas B
Teams in Lugones/Llugones: Garfil Atlético de Lugones, Lugones Rangers B
Teams in Mieres del Camín: Mieresala B, Racing B
Teams in Oviedo/Uviéu city: KM0, La Corredoria

Team	City
AD Monsacro-Mostayal	Santolaya, Morcín
Alto Aller FS B	Cabanaquinta/Cabañaquinta, Aller/Ayer
Arenas de Manzaneda CD B	Santaolaya, Oviedo/Uviéu
CD Garfil FSK Atlético de Lugones	Lugones/Llugones, Siero
CD Gijón Perchera FS B	Perchera-La Braña, Gijón/Xixón
CD Gijón Playas FS B	Gijón/Xixón
El Penote FS	Colunga
La Isla de Siero FS B	La Pola Siero, Siero
Lugones Rangers B	Lugones/Llugones, Siero
Mieresala B	Mieres del Camín, Mieres
Plaza Najosa FS	Nava
Racing de Mieres FS B	Mieres del Camín, Mieres
Rayo Langreano FS	Sama, Llangréu/Langreo
SD KM0	Oviedo/Uviéu
SDCR La Corredoria	La Corredoria, Oviedo/Uviéu

Group 2

2026–27 Segunda Asturfutsal teams (Group 2)
Teams in Corvera de Asturias/Corvera: Congelados Glaciar, Los Campos
Teams in Llanera: Olímpico de Lugo de Llanera, San Cucao B
Teams in Soto del Barco/Sotu'l Barcu municipality: Amigos de Soto B, Caseras

Team	City
Amigos Soto Barco FS B	Sotu, Soto del Barco/Sotu'l Barcu
CD Caseras	L'Arena, Soto del Barco/Sotu'l Barcu
CD Inter-Bares de Boal	Boal/Bual
CD Las Regueras	Santullano/Santuyanu, Las Regueras/Les Regueres
CD Los Campos FS	Trasona/Tresona, Corvera de Asturias/Corvera
CD Muros Balompié FS	Muros de Nalón/Muros
CD Quirós FS	Bárzana, Quirós
CDB La Folleca FS	Raíces Nuevo/La Fundición, Castrillón
CO Lugo (Olímpico de Lugo de Llanera)	La Estación/Lugo de Llanera, Llanera
Congelados Glaciar FS	Los Campos, Corvera de Asturias/Covera
Marino de As Figueiras	As Figueiras, Castropol
Navia FS Parque Histórico	Navia
Río Nonaya Futsal	Salas
San Cucao FS B	Posada, Llanera
Somiedo CD	La Pola Somiedo/Pola de Somiedo, Somiedo

== Femenino Sénior Futsal ==
Femenino Sénior Futsal
- Country: Spain
- Number of clubs: 12
- Level on pyramid: 3
- Promotion to: Segunda División FS Femenina
- Domestic cup: Copa Principado Femenino Sénior Fútbol Sala
- Current champions: Rodiles FS B
- Website: Official website

Femenino Sénior Futsal is the only level of the Asturian local women's futsal league system. All the clubs are based in the Principality of Asturias.

=== The league ===
Femenino Sénior Futsal is made up by 12 teams. At the end of the season, the champion will qualify for the national promotion playoff to Segunda División FS Femenina. This playoff will be a single knockout round, home and away tie. The Asturian champion will face a team from Aragón, Balearic Islands, Basque Country, Canary Islands, Cantabria, Castile and León, Ceuta, Extremadura, La Rioja, Melilla, Navarre, Region of Murcia or Valencian Community. On the other hand, the winners of the autonomic leagues from Andalusia, Castilla-La Mancha, Catalonia, Community of Madrid and Galicia will be promoted directly to Segunda División FS Femenina, as they were the five local federations with the highest number of female futsal licenses in the 2023-24 season. The best eight teams at the end of the regular season will qualify for the Copa Principado Femenina Sénior Fútbol Sala, which it will be played between 2026 May and June.

=== 2026–27 teams ===
2026–27 Femenino Sénior Futsal teams
Teams in Oviedo/Uviéu city: Montealto, Ovifem A, Ovifem B

Team	City
CD Los Campos FS	Trasona/Tresona, Corvera de Asturias/Corvera
CD Montealto	Oviedo/Uviéu
CD Ovifem A	Oviedo/Uviéu
CD Ovifem B	Oviedo/Uviéu
Club Santiago de Aller	Morea/Moreda, Aller/Ayer
Gimnástico de Caborana	Caborana, Aller/Ayer
Navia FS Parque Histórico	Navia
Planta 14 FS A	Ciañu, Llangréu/Langreo
Planta 14 FS B	Ciañu, Llangréu/Langreo
Restaurante-Sidrería Cabañaquinta GFF	Gijón/Xixón
Rodiles FS C	Villaviciosa
Villa de Tineo FS A	Tineo/Tinéu

=== Copa Principado Femenino Sénior Fútbol Sala ===
==== List of finals ====
Season	Venue	Winners	Runners-up	Score
2021–2022	Polideportivo de Oñón, Mieres del Camín	Planta 14 FS A	Rodiles FS B	1–0
2022–2023	Polideportivo de La Cebera-Santa Bárbara, Lugones/Llugones	Planta 14 FS A	Rodiles FS B	2–1
2023–2024	Polideportivo, La Felguera	Rodiles FS B	Gijón FF	6–4
2024–2025	Polideportivo, Ciañu	Mieresala	Planta 14 FS	5–4
2025–2026	Polideportivo "Antonio Vázquez Megido", Morea/Moreda	Club Santiago de Aller	Planta 14 FS A	3–2
