= Puerto de Vega CF =

Association football club in Spain

Puerto de Vega
- Full name: Puerto de Vega Club de Fútbol
- Founded: 25 April 1992; 34 years ago
- Stadium: Campo de Fútbol El Campón
- Capacity: 1,000
- President: José Ramón Pérez
- Head coach: Sergio García Suárez
- League: Primera Asturfútbol
- 2025–26: Primera Asturfútbol, 9th of 19
Home colours	Away colours

Puerto de Vega Club de Fútbol is a Spanish football team based in Puerto de Vega, in the autonomous community of Asturias. Founded in 1992, they play in Primera Asturfútbol, holding home matches at Campo de Fútbol El Campón.

== Season to season ==
Season	Tier	Division	Place	Copa del Rey
1992–93	7	2ª Reg.	10th	
1993–94	7	2ª Reg.	6th	
1994–95	7	2ª Reg.	5th	
1995–96	7	2ª Reg.	18th	
1996–97	7	2ª Reg.	15th	
1997–98	7	2ª Reg.	4th	
1998–99	7	2ª Reg.	12th	
1999–2000	7	2ª Reg.	12th	
2000–01	7	2ª Reg.	12th	
2001–02	7	2ª Reg.	14th	
2002–03	7	2ª Reg.	13th	
2003–04	7	2ª Reg.	13th	
2004–05	7	2ª Reg.	10th	
2005–06	7	2ª Reg.	11th	
2006–07	DNP			
2007–08	7	2ª Reg.	15th	
2008–09	7	2ª Reg.	6th	
2009–10	7	2ª Reg.	2nd	
2010–11	6	1ª Reg.	13th	
2011–12	6	1ª Reg.	17th	

Season	Tier	Division	Place	Copa del Rey
2012–13	7	2ª Reg.	7th	
2013–14	7	2ª Reg.	5th	
2014–15	7	2ª Reg.	7th	
2015–16	7	2ª Reg.	5th	
2016–17	7	2ª Reg.	4th	
2017–18	7	2ª Reg.	2nd	
2018–19	6	1ª Reg.	9th	
2019–20	6	1ª Reg.	11th	
2020–21	6	1ª Reg.	4th	
2021–22	7	1ª Reg.	4th	
2022–23	7	2ª RFFPA	5th	
2023–24	7	2ª Ast.	1st	
2024–25	6	1ª Ast.	14th	
2025–26	6	1ª Ast.		First round
