= Nalón CF =

Spanish football club

Nalón
- Full name: Nalón Club de Fútbol
- Founded: 1996; 30 years ago
- Stadium: Campo Municipal de Fumea-Lolo Rodríguez
- Capacity: 300
- President: Pablo Rodríguez Barranco
- Head coach: Jonas Redondo
- League: Primera Asturfútbol
- 2025–26: Segunda Asturfútbol – Group 2, 1st of 18 (champions)
- Website: http://www.naloncf.com/
Home colours	Away colours

Nalón Club de Fútbol is a Spanish football club based in the parish of Olloniego, in Oviedo, Asturias. Founded in 1996, the team plays in Primera Asturfútbol. The club played their home games at Campo Municipal de Fumea-Lolo Rodríguez, which has a capacity of 300 spectators.

== History ==
The first club in Olloniego was Club Nalón, founded on 24 June 1957. Years later, after the dissolution of this club, the new Nalón CF was created in 1996.

In 2008 the club promoted for the first time in its history to Tercera División, but was immediately relegated despite earning a draw against regional powerhouse Real Oviedo at Estadio Carlos Tartiere. Only one year later, Nalón promoted again to the fourth tier and played in it two more years before coming back to Regional Preferente.

== Season to season ==
Season	Level	Division	Place	Copa del Rey
1996–97	7	2ª Reg.	8th	
1997–98	7	2ª Reg.	3rd	
1998–99	7	2ª Reg.	1st	
1999–2000	6	1ª Reg.	3rd	
2000–01	5	Reg. Pref.	10th	
2001–02	5	Reg. Pref.	17th	
2002–03	6	1ª Reg.	5th	
2003–04	6	1ª Reg.	3rd	
2004–05	5	Reg. Pref.	13th	
2005–06	5	Reg. Pref.	6th	
2006–07	5	Reg. Pref.	11th	
2007–08	5	Reg. Pref.	2nd	
2008–09	4	3ª	18th	
2009–10	5	Reg. Pref.	3rd	
2010–11	4	3ª	16th	
2011–12	4	3ª	18th	
2012–13	5	Reg. Pref.	15th	
2013–14	5	Reg. Pref.	18th	
2014–15	6	1ª Reg.	1st	
2015–16	5	Reg. Pref.	7th	

Season	Level	Division	Place	Copa del Rey
2016–17	5	Reg. Pref.	5th	
2017–18	5	Reg. Pref.	8th	
2018–19	5	Reg. Pref.	16th	
2019–20	5	Reg. Pref.	18th	
2020–21	5	Reg. Pref.	4th	
2021–22	6	Reg. Pref.	8th	Preliminary
2022–23	7	2ª RFFPA	4th	
2023–24	7	2ª Astur.	4th	
2024–25	7	2ª Astur.	11th	
2025–26	7	2ª Astur.		

- 3 seasons in Tercera División
