= UD San Claudio =

San Claudio
- Full name: Unión Deportiva San Claudio
- Founded: 1967
- Ground: José Ramón Suárez Fernández, Oviedo, Asturias, Spain
- President: Pedro Polledo
- Manager: Fontoria
- League: Primera Asturfútbol
- 2024–25: Segunda Asturfútbol – Group 2, 2nd of 18 (promoted via play-offs)
Home colours

Unión Deportiva San Claudio is a Spanish football club based in the parish of San Claudio, Oviedo, Asturias. Founded in 1967, it currently plays in Primera Asturfútbol.

== History ==
On 30 April 2018, San Claudio promoted to Tercera División for the first time ever.

== Season to season ==
Season	Tier	Division	Place	Copa del Rey
1991–92	7	2ª Reg.	7th	
1992–93	7	2ª Reg.	8th	
1993–94	7	2ª Reg.	9th	
1994–2003	DNP			
2003–04	7	2ª Reg.	10th	
2004–05	7	2ª Reg.	6th	
2005–06	7	2ª Reg.	1st	
2006–07	6	1ª Reg.	12th	
2007–08	6	1ª Reg.	8th	
2008–09	6	1ª Reg.	13th	
2009–10	6	1ª Reg.	4th	
2010–11	6	1ª Reg.	12th	
2011–12	6	1ª Reg.	12th	
2012–13	6	1ª Reg.	2nd	
2013–14	6	1ª Reg.	1st	
2014–15	5	Reg. Pref.	12th	
2015–16	5	Reg. Pref.	14th	
2016–17	5	Reg. Pref.	7th	
2017–18	5	Reg. Pref.	1st	
2018–19	4	3ª	20th	

Season	Tier	Division	Place	Copa del Rey
2019–20	5	Reg. Pref.	5th	
2020–21	5	Reg. Pref.	18th	
2021–22	5	Reg. Pref.	7th	
2022–23	7	2ª RFFPA	5th	
2023–24	7	2ª Astur.	2nd	
2024–25	7	2ª Astur.	2nd	
2025–26	6	1ª Astur.		

- 1 season in Tercera División

== Basketball section ==
Between 2008 and 2013, San Claudio had a basketball team that played in the Asturian group of the Primera División, Spanish fifth tier. In 2010 and 2012, they played the league Final Four, being defeated in both times in the semifinals.

Season	Tier	Division	Pos.	W–L
2008–09	5	1ª División	6th	13–9
2009–10	5	1ª División	3rd	15–9
2010–11	5	1ª División	6th	12–10
2011–12	5	1ª División	4th	16–8
2012–13	5	1ª División	6th	9–11
