= CD Vallobín =

Association football club in Spain

Coordinates: 43.372015°N 5.865742°W

Vallobín
- Full name: Club Deportivo Vallobín
- Founded: 1994; 32 years ago
- Stadium: Estadio Vallobín
- Capacity: 500
- President: Miguel Cano Mier
- Head coach: Abel Fernández
- League: Primera Asturfútbol
- 2025–26: Primera Asturfútbol, 11th of 19
- Website: cdvallobin.es
Home colours	Away colours

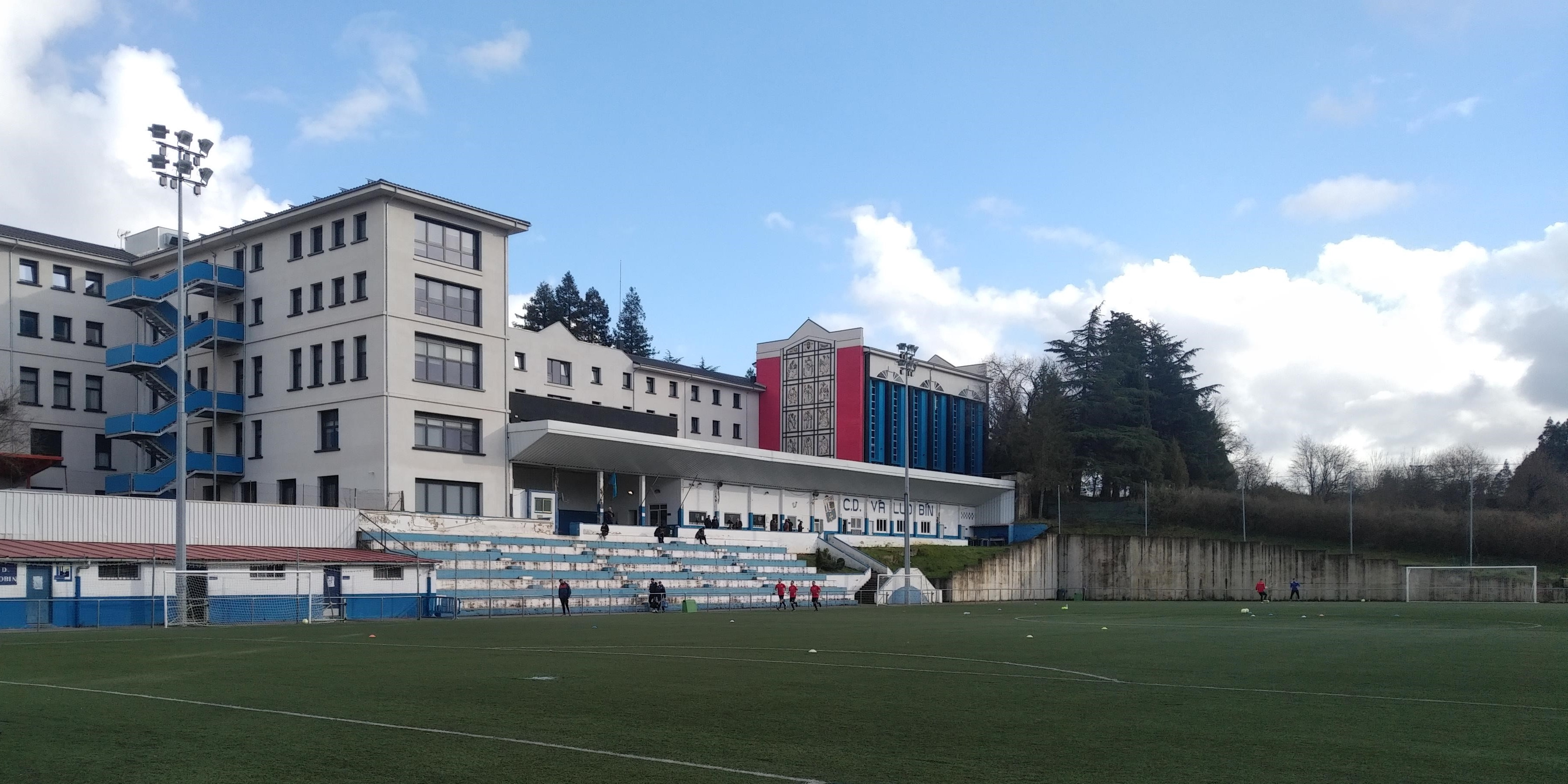
The stadium of Vallobín.

Club Deportivo Vallobín is a Spanish football club based in Oviedo, Asturias. Founded in 1994, it plays its home games at Estadio Vallobín, in the namesake neighbourhood.

== History ==
Despite being founded in 1994, Vallobín did not create their senior squad until 2002.

In 2019, the club achieved promotion to Tercera División for the first time ever, after only spending two seasons in the fifth tier.

== Season to season ==
Season	Tier	Division	Place	Copa del Rey
2002–03	7	2ª Reg.	11th	
2003–04	7	2ª Reg.	16th	
2004–05	7	2ª Reg.	11th	
2005–06	7	2ª Reg.	11th	
2006–07	7	2ª Reg.	7th	
2007–08	7	2ª Reg.	3rd	
2008–09	7	2ª Reg.	10th	
2009–10	7	2ª Reg.	3rd	
2010–11	6	1ª Reg.	15th	
2011–12	6	1ª Reg.	8th	
2012–13	6	1ª Reg.	4th	
2013–14	6	1ª Reg.	11th	
2014–15	6	1ª Reg.	3rd	
2015–16	6	1ª Reg.	4th	
2016–17	6	1ª Reg.	1st	
2017–18	5	Reg. Pref.	5th	
2018–19	5	Reg. Pref.	2nd	
2019–20	4	3ª	17th	
2020–21	4	3ª	10th / 6th	
2021–22	6	Reg. Pref.	5th	

Season	Tier	Division	Place	Copa del Rey
2022–23	6	1ª RFFPA	16th	
2023–24	6	1ª Astur.	8th	
2024–25	6	1ª Astur.	11th	
2025–26	6	1ª Astur.		

2 seasons in Tercera División
