= UP Langreo B =

Spanish football club

Langreo B
- Full name: Unión Popular de Langreo "B"
- Founded: 1982 (as UP Langreo Promesas); 2015 (as CD Langreo Eulalia)
- Ground: Ganzábal, Langreo, Asturias, Spain
- Capacity: 4,024
- President: Vicente Fernández-Miranda
- Manager: Adrián Palacio
- League: Segunda Asturfútbol – Group 2
- 2024–25: Segunda Asturfútbol – Group 1, 15th of 18
- Website: www.uplangreo.es
Home colours	Away colours

Unión Popular de Langreo "B" is a Spanish football team based in Langreo, in the autonomous community of Asturias. Founded in 1982, they are the reserve team of UP Langreo, and play in Segunda Asturfútbol – Group 2.

== History ==
Founded in 1982 as UP Langreo Promesas, the B-team ceased activities in 2004, already under the name of UP Langreo B. They returned ten years later, but just played one season.

In 2015, CD Langreo Eulalia was founded; initially an associate club, they were absorbed by Langreo in 2019, being renamed UP Langreo B. In June 2021, the club achieved a first-ever promotion to Tercera División RFEF.

== Season to season ==
- As a farm team

Season	Tier	Division	Place	Copa del Rey
1982–83	6	1ª Reg.	2nd	
1983–84	5	Reg. Pref.	19th	
1984–85	6	1ª Reg.	13th	
1985–86	7	2ª Reg.	7th	
1986–87	7	2ª Reg.	8th	

- As a reserve team

Season	Tier	Division	Place
1991–92	7	2ª Reg.	1st
1992–93	6	1ª Reg.	11th
1993–94	6	1ª Reg.	3rd
1994–95	5	Reg. Pref.	9th
1995–96	5	Reg. Pref.	7th
1996–97	5	Reg. Pref.	7th
1997–98	5	Reg. Pref.	9th
1998–99	5	Reg. Pref.	13th
1999–2000	5	Reg. Pref.	15th
2000–01	5	Reg. Pref.	19th
2001–02	6	1ª Reg.	7th
2002–03	6	1ª Reg.	2nd
2003–04	5	Reg. Pref.	20th
2004–2014	DNP		
2014–15	7	2ª Reg.	5th
2015–16	7	2ª Reg.	5th
2016–17	7	2ª Reg.	1st
2017–18	6	1ª Reg.	11th
2018–19	6	1ª Reg.	2nd
2019–20	6	1ª Reg.	1st

Season	Tier	Division	Place
2020–21	5	Reg. Pref.	1st
2021–22	5	3ª RFEF	19th
2022–23	6	1ª RFFPA	19th
2023–24	7	2ª Astur.	9th
2024–25	7	2ª Astur.	15th
2025–26	7	2ª Astur.	

- 1 season in Tercera División RFEF
