= SDR San Lázaro =

Association football club in Spain

San Lázaro
- Full name: Sociedad Deportiva y Recreativa San Lázaro
- Founded: 1978
- Dissolved: 2003, merged with Oviedo Antiguo CF
- Stadium: Pistas de San Lázaro, Oviedo/Uviéu, Asturias, Spain
- Capacity: 2,500
- League: Regional Preferente
- 2002–03: 20th
Home colours

Sociedad Deportiva y Recreativa San Lázaro was a Spanish football club based in Oviedo/Uviéu, Asturias, in the namesake neighbourhood. Founded in 1978, it merged with Oviedo Antiguo CF in 2003, becoming known as Oviedo Antiguo San Lázaro Club de Fútbol until its dissolution in 2011. San Lázaro played its home games at Pistas de San Lázaro, currently known as Centro Deportivo de San Lázaro Alberto Suárez Laso. The club's traditional colors were sky blue and white.

== History ==
In 1954, a football club named Club Deportivo San Lázaro was created. CD San Lázaro only played local friendly tournaments, and it would not be until 1978 that SDR San Lázaro was founded, establishing football and baseball teams, spending most of its history playing in Regional leagues. In 2001, after only spending two seasons in the fifth tier, the club achieved promotion to Tercera División – Group 2 for the first time ever, after finishing in second place with 76 points. San Lázaro played only one season in the fourth tier, finishing the league at the bottom of the table with only four wins, nine draws, and twenty-five losses. In the following season, San Lázaro suffered a new relegation, now to the sixth tier, after winning two games in Regional Preferente, getting five draws and thirty-one losses.

In the summer of 2003, football in Oviedo/Uviéu suffered a major crisis, as Real Oviedo was forced to be relegated to the Tercera División – Group 2 due to its high debts. With the aim of replacing the main team of the city, the local government decided to take control of Astur CF, which was established in the fourth tier, changing its name to Oviedo Astur Club de Fútbol (commonly known as Oviedo ACF), as well as its logo and colours, closer to Real Oviedo's branding.

This situation pushed SDR San Lázaro to merge with Oviedo Antiguo CF, a club founded in 1996, as both clubs shared the stadium and the recently created Oviedo ACF was moved to Pistas de San Lázaro, as it is the second-biggest stadium in Oviedo/Uviéu.

During the next years, football was gradually disappearing from Pistas de San Lázaro (only used nowadays for track and field competitions and rugby union games), and Oviedo Antiguo San Lázaro Club de Fútbol played during its last seasons in La Pixarra, a sport complex located in the parish of Santa Mariña de Piedramuelle, on the outskirts of Oviedo/Uviéu, away from the neighbourhood of San Lázaro.

As a curiosity, in the season 2004–05, Oviedo Antiguo San Lázaro had two senior teams playing in the same league, Segunda Regional de Asturias, the lowest tier until 2021: the main team played in the Group 1, promoting to Primera Regional at the end of the season with 80 points; and its reserve team played in the Group 2, finishing 17th of 20 teams.

=== Background ===
- Sociedad Deportiva y Recreativa San Lázaro (1978–2003)
- Oviedo Antiguo San Lázaro Club de Fútbol (2003–2011)

== Club crest ==
The club's visual identity has evolved through several stages, reflecting its history and the 2003 merger with Oviedo Antiguo CF:

- San Lázaro original logo: A stylized oval monogram where a red "S" (Sociedad) forms the outer structure, with a blue "D" (Deportiva) and a white "R" (Recreativa) fused in the center. The name "San Lázaro" is placed vertically on the left.
- Ceremonial version: A formal version of the original crest, placing the oval monogram inside a white shield topped with a royal crown and flanked by two green laurel branches.
- Oviedo Antiguo original logo: A rounded blue shield featuring a silver illustration of the Cathedral of San Salvador and a golden football at the base, with the initials "O.A.C.F." at the top.
- Merger logo: In 2003, the new Oviedo Antiguo San Lázaro adopted a hybrid shield divided vertically. The left half shows the original monogram of San Lázaro and the right half features the Cathedral. The royal crown was replaced by the Cross of the Angels, the symbol of Oviedo/Uviéu.
Original SDR San Lázaro monogram

Ceremonial version with the royal crown and laurels

Crest of Oviedo Antiguo CF

Final hybrid crest after the 2003 merger

== Season to season ==
SDR San Lázaro

Season	Tier	Division	Place	Copa del Rey
1978–79	7	2ª Reg.	9th	
1979–80	7	2ª Reg.	14th	
1980–81	7	2ª Reg.	6th	
1981–82	7	2ª Reg.	6th	
1982–83	7	2ª Reg.	5th	
1983–84	7	2ª Reg.	2nd	
1984–85	6	1ª Reg.	8th	
1985–86	6	1ª Reg.	14th	
1986–87	6	1ª Reg.	11th	
1987–88	6	1ª Reg.	12th	
1988–89	6	1ª Reg.	4th	
1989–90	6	1ª Reg.	16th	
1990–91	6	1ª Reg.	18th	
1991–92	7	2ª Reg.	8th	
1992–93	7	2ª Reg.	6th	
1993–94	7	2ª Reg.	8th	
1994–95	7	2ª Reg.	5th	
1995–96	7	2ª Reg.	2nd	
1996–97	6	1ª Reg.	4th	
1997–98	6	1ª Reg.	2nd	
1998–99	5	Reg. Pref.	16th	
1999–00	6	1ª Reg.	1st	
2000–01	5	Reg. Pref.	2nd	
2001–02	4	3ª	20th	
2002–03	5	Reg. Pref.	20th	

- 1 season in Tercera División

Oviedo Antiguo San Lázaro CF

Season	Tier	Division	Place	Copa del Rey
2003–04	6	1ª Reg.	17th	
2004–05	7	2ª Reg.	2nd	
2005–06	6	1ª Reg.	15th	
2006–07	6	1ª Reg.	13th	
2007–08	6	1ª Reg.	14th	
2008–09	6	1ª Reg.	17th	
2009–10	7	2ª Reg.	12th	
2010–11	7	2ª Reg.	16th	
