= Real Avilés Industrial CF B =

Spanish football club

Avilés Industrial B
- Full name: Real Avilés Industrial Club de Fútbol "B"
- Founded: 2006; 2022 (refounded)
- Stadium: La Toba II
- President: Diego Baeza
- Head coach: Geni Suárez
- League: Primera Asturfútbol
- 2025–26: Segunda Asturfútbol – Group 1, 1st of 18 (champions)
Home colours	Away colours

Real Avilés Industrial Club de Fútbol "B" is a Spanish football team based in Avilés, in the autonomous community of Asturias. Founded in 2006 and refounded in 2022, they are the reserve team of Real Avilés Industrial CF, and play in the Primera Asturfútbol.

== History ==
Real Avilés had several reserve teams during its history, being Carbayedo CF the most important one, which played in Tercera División in the 1967–68 season. Other reserve teams did not pass the lowest division. During the 1990s and the 2000s, Real Avilés agreed with several Asturian teams, especially with Navarro, collaboration agreements.

The last reserve team was reinstated in 2006 and promoted to Tercera División in 2013. Five years later, as a result of the serious crisis in the club, it was folded after being relegated to the last division.

In 2022, Avilés B returned to an active status, being renamed Real Avilés Industrial CF B in the following year.

== Season to season ==
Season	Level	Division	Place
2006–07	7	2ª Reg.	1st
2007–08	6	1ª Reg.	6th
2008–09	6	1ª Reg.	4th
2009–10	6	1ª Reg.	1st
2010–11	5	Reg. Pref.	10th
2011–12	5	Reg. Pref.	13th
2012–13	5	Reg. Pref.	1st
2013–14	4	3ª	11th
2014–15	4	3ª	12th
2015–16	5	Reg. Pref.	19th
2016–17	6	1ª Reg.	6th
2017–18	6	1ª Reg.	16th
2018–2022	DNP		
2022–23	8	3ª RFFPA	7th
2023–24	8	3ª Astur.	5th
2024–25	8	3ª Astur.	3rd
2025–26	7	2ª Astur.	
