= Barcia CF =

Association football club in Spain

Barcia
- Full name: Barcia Club de Fútbol
- Founded: 1931
- Ground: San Sebastián, Barcia, Valdés, Asturias, Spain
- Capacity: 1,000
- President: Miguel Cañamero
- Head coach: Pablo Barbón
- League: Segunda Asturfútbol – Group 1
- 2025–26: Primera Asturfútbol, 19th of 19 (relegated)
Home colours	Away colours

Barcia Club de Fútbol is a Spanish football team based in Barcia, a small village in the municipality of Valdés, in the autonomous community of Asturias. Founded in 1931, they play in Segunda Asturfútbol – Group 1, holding home matches at Campo de Fútbol San Sebastián.

== Season to season ==
Season	Tier	Division	Place	Copa del Rey
1960–61	5	2ª Reg.	1st	
1961–62	5	2ª Reg.	2nd	
1962–63	5	2ª Reg.	2nd	
1963–64	5	2ª Reg.	2nd	
1964–65	5	2ª Reg.	5th	
1965–66	5	2ª Reg.	1st	
1966–67	5	2ª Reg.	7th	
1967–68	5	2ª Reg.	(R)	
1968–69	DNP			
1969–70	5	2ª Reg.	3rd	
1970–71	5	2ª Reg.	1st	
1971–72	5	2ª Reg.	8th	
1972–73	5	2ª Reg.	12th	
1973–74	DNP			
1974–75	6	2ª Reg.	1st	
1975–76	6	2ª Reg.	2nd	
1976–77	6	2ª Reg.	1st	
1977–78	7	2ª Reg.	1st	
1978–79	7	2ª Reg.	7th	
1979–80	7	2ª Reg.	11th	

Season	Tier	Division	Place	Copa del Rey
1980–81	7	2ª Reg.	6th	
1981–82	7	2ª Reg.	5th	
1982–83	7	2ª Reg.	2nd	
1983–84	7	2ª Reg.	5th	
1984–85	7	2ª Reg.	5th	
1985–1990	DNP			
1990–91	7	2ª Reg.	7th	
1991–1999	DNP			
1999–2000	7	2ª Reg.	9th	
2000–01	7	2ª Reg.	5th	
2001–02	7	2ª Reg.	3rd	
2002–03	7	2ª Reg.	2nd	
2003–04	7	2ª Reg.	5th	
2004–05	7	2ª Reg.	3rd	
2005–06	6	1ª Reg.	9th	
2006–07	6	1ª Reg.	11th	
2007–08	6	1ª Reg.	10th	
2008–09	6	1ª Reg.	14th	
2009–10	6	1ª Reg.	6th	
2010–11	6	1ª Reg.	2nd	

Season	Tier	Division	Place	Copa del Rey
2011–12	6	1ª Reg.	14th	
2012–13	6	1ª Reg.	9th	
2013–14	6	1ª Reg.	13th	
2014–15	6	1ª Reg.	16th	
2015–16	7	2ª Reg.	7th	
2016–17	7	2ª Reg.	10th	
2017–18	7	2ª Reg.	1st	
2018–19	6	1ª Reg.	8th	
2019–20	6	1ª Reg.	3rd	
2020–21	5	Reg. Pref.	4th	
2021–22	6	Reg. Pref.	3rd	
2022–23	6	1ª RFFPA	4th	
2023–24	5	3ª Fed.	18th	
2024–25	6	1ª Ast.	9th	
2025–26	6	1ª Ast.		

- 1 season in Tercera Federación
