= Real Tapia CF =

Spanish football club

Real Tapia
- Full name: Real Tapia Club de Fútbol
- Founded: 1947
- Ground: La Xungueira, Tapia, Asturias, Spain
- Capacity: 4,000
- Chairman: (Spain) Gerardo Palacio
- Manager: (Spain) Quique Fanjul
- League: Tercera Asturfútbol – Group 4
- 2024–25: Tercera Asturfútbol – Group 4, 6th of 16
| Home colours | Away colours |

Real Tapia Club de Fútbol is a Spanish football club based in Tapia de Casariego, in the autonomous community of Asturias. Founded in 1947 it currently plays in Tercera Asturfútbol – Group 4, holding home games at Estadio La Xungueira, with a 4,000-seat capacity.

== History ==
The club promoted for the first time to Tercera División in 2005.

In February 2014, due to a heavy surge in all the Northern Spain, the main field of the club, La Xungueira, was totally busted.

== Season to season ==
| Season | Level | Division | Place | Copa del Rey |
|---|---|---|---|---|
| 1947–1959 | — | Regional | — | |
| 1959–60 | 5 | 2ª Reg. | 2nd | |
| 1960–61 | 5 | 2ª Reg. | 5th | |
| 1961–62 | 5 | 2ª Reg. | 8th | |
| 1962–63 | 5 | 2ª Reg. | 5th | |
| 1963–64 | 5 | 2ª Reg. | 5th | |
| 1964–65 | 5 | 2ª Reg. | 3rd | |
| 1965–66 | 5 | 2ª Reg. | 5th | |
| 1966–67 | 5 | 2ª Reg. | 3rd | |
| 1967–1980 | DNP | | | |
| 1980–81 | 7 | 2ª Reg. | 4th | |
| 1981–82 | 7 | 2ª Reg. | 8th | |
| 1982–83 | 7 | 2ª Reg. | 5th | |
| 1983–84 | 7 | 2ª Reg. | 4th | |
| 1984–85 | 7 | 2ª Reg. | 2nd | |
| 1985–86 | 7 | 2ª Reg. | 2nd | |
| 1986–87 | 7 | 2ª Reg. | 1st | |
| 1987–88 | 6 | 1ª Reg. | 2nd | |
| 1988–89 | 5 | Reg. Pref. | 13th | |
| 1989–90 | 5 | Reg. Pref. | 14th | |

| Season | Level | Division | Place | Copa del Rey |
|---|---|---|---|---|
| 1990–91 | 5 | Reg. Pref. | 12th | |
| 1991–92 | 5 | Reg. Pref. | 9th | |
| 1992–93 | 5 | Reg. Pref. | 18th | |
| 1993–94 | 5 | Reg. Pref. | 18th | |
| 1994–95 | 6 | 1ª Reg. | 1st | |
| 1995–96 | 5 | Reg. Pref. | 9th | |
| 1996–97 | 5 | Reg. Pref. | 4th | |
| 1997–98 | 5 | Reg. Pref. | 10th | |
| 1998–99 | 5 | Reg. Pref. | 18th | |
| 1999–2000 | 6 | 1ª Reg. | 4th | |
| 2000–01 | 6 | 1ª Reg. | 6th | |
| 2001–02 | 6 | 1ª Reg. | 3rd | |
| 2002–03 | 5 | Reg. Pref. | 5th | |
| 2003–04 | 5 | Reg. Pref. | 10th | |
| 2004–05 | 5 | Reg. Pref. | 1st | |
| 2005–06 | 4 | 3ª | 18th | |
| 2006–07 | 5 | Reg. Pref. | 2nd | |
| 2007–08 | 4 | 3ª | 18th | |
| 2008–09 | 5 | Reg. Pref. | 7th | |
| 2009–10 | 5 | Reg. Pref. | 19th | |

| Season | Level | Division | Place | Copa del Rey |
|---|---|---|---|---|
| 2010–11 | 6 | 1ª Reg. | 1st | |
| 2011–12 | 5 | Reg. Pref. | 5th | |
| 2012–13 | 4 | 3ª | 14th | |
| 2013–14 | 4 | 3ª | 20th | |
| 2004–15 | 5 | Reg. Pref. | 17th | |
| 2015–16 | 6 | 1ª Reg. | 3rd | |
| 2016–17 | 6 | 1ª Reg. | 3rd | |
| 2017–18 | 6 | 1ª Reg. | 4th | |
| 2018–19 | 6 | 1ª Reg. | 6th | |
| 2019–20 | 6 | 1ª Reg. | 2nd | |
| 2020–21 | 5 | Reg. Pref. | 6th | |
| 2021–22 | 6 | Reg. Pref. | 8th | |
| 2022–23 | 7 | 2ª RFFPA | 16th | |
| 2023–24 | 8 | 3ª Astur. | 6th | |
| 2024–25 | 8 | 3ª Astur. | 6th | |
| 2025–26 | 8 | 3ª Astur. | | |

- 4 seasons in Tercera División

== Women's team ==
Real Tapia created a women's football team in 2007. It always competed unconsistenly in the Regional league.

=== Season by season ===
| Season | Division | Place | Copa de la Reina |
|---|---|---|---|
| 2007–08 | Regional | 8th | |
| 2008–09 | Regional | 4th | |
| 2009–10 | | DNP | |
| 2010–11 | Regional | 2nd | |
| 2011–12 | Regional | 7th | |
| 2012–2017 | | DNP | |
| 2017–18 | Regional | 16th | |
| 2018–19 | Regional | 20th | |
| 2019–20 | Regional | 9th | |
