= Andés CF =

Andés
- Full name: Andés Club de Fútbol
- Founded: 1949
- Ground: Campo de San Pedro, Andés, Asturias, Spain
- Capacity: 3,000
- Chairman: (Spain) Ramón García López
- Manager: (Spain) Iván Palacios
- League: Tercera Federación – Group 2
- 2025–26: Primera Asturfútbol, 4th of 19 (promoted)
Home colours	Away colours

Andés Club de Fútbol is a football team based in Las Cortinas de Andés, Navia in the autonomous community of Asturias. Founded in 1949, the team plays in the Tercera Federación – Group 2. The club's home ground is Campo de San Pedro, which has a capacity of 3,000 spectators.

== Season to season ==
Season	Level	Division	Place	Copa del Rey
1960–61	5	2ª Reg.	7th	
1961–62	5	2ª Reg.	3rd	
1962–63	5	2ª Reg.	3rd	
1963–64	5	2ª Reg.	4th	
1964–65	5	2ª Reg.	4th	
1965–66	5	2ª Reg.	7th	
1966–1973	DNP			
1973–74	6	2ª Reg.	2nd	
1974–75	6	2ª Reg.	2nd	
1975–76	6	2ª Reg.	5th	
1976–77	6	2ª Reg.	2nd	
1977–78	6	2ª Reg. P.	9th	
1978–79	6	1ª Reg.	15th	
1979–80	6	1ª Reg.	13th	
1980–81	6	1ª Reg.	10th	
1981–82	6	1ª Reg.	7th	
1982–83	6	1ª Reg.	13th	
1983–84	6	1ª Reg.	10th	
1984–85	6	1ª Reg.	13th	
1985–86	7	2ª Reg.	3rd	

Season	Level	Division	Place	Copa del Rey
1986–87	6	1ª Reg.	10th	
1987–88	6	1ª Reg.	4th	
1988–89	6	1ª Reg.	16th	
1989–90	6	1ª Reg.	6th	
1990–91	6	1ª Reg.	1st	
1991–92	5	Reg. Pref.	20th	
1992–93	6	1ª Reg.	7th	
1993–94	6	1ª Reg.	12th	
1994–95	6	1ª Reg.	2nd	
1995–96	5	Reg. Pref.	15th	
1996–97	5	Reg. Pref.	3rd	
1997–98	4	3ª	10th	
1998–99	4	3ª	11th	
1999–2000	4	3ª	20th	
2000–01	5	Reg. Pref.	15th	
2001–02	5	Reg. Pref.	5th	
2002–03	5	Reg. Pref.	14th	
2003–04	5	Reg. Pref.	2nd	
2004–05	4	3ª	20th	
2005–06	5	Reg. Pref.	5th	

Season	Level	Division	Place	Copa del Rey
2006–07	5	Reg. Pref.	7th	
2007–08	5	Reg. Pref.	12th	
2008–09	5	Reg. Pref.	11th	
2009–10	5	Reg. Pref.	4th	
2010–11	4	3ª	18th	
2011–12	5	Reg. Pref.	15th	
2012–13	5	Reg. Pref.	3rd	
2013–14	4	3ª	17th	
2014–15	4	3ª	16th	
2015–16	5	Reg. Pref.	4th	
2016–17	5	Reg. Pref.	10th	
2017–18	5	Reg. Pref.	13th	
2018–19	5	Reg. Pref.	18th	
2019–20	6	1ª Reg.	4th	
2020–21	6	1ª Reg.	1st	
2021–22	6	Reg. Pref.	5th	
2022–23	6	1ª RFFPA	12th	
2023–24	6	1ª Astur.	9th	
2024–25	6	1ª Astur.	12th	
2025–26	6	1ª Astur.	4th	
2026–27	5	3ª Fed.		

- 7 seasons in Tercera División
- 1 season in Tercera Federación
