= CD La Madalena de Morcín =

La Madalena de Morcín
- Full name: Club Deportivo La Madalena de Morcín
- Nickname: Madalena
- Founded: 2007
- Ground: Santa Eulalia, Morcín, Asturias, Spain
- Capacity: 1000
- Chairman: Alberto Díaz García
- Manager: Pablo Escobio
- League: Segunda Asturfútbol – Group 2
- 2024–25: Segunda Asturfútbol – Group 1, 5th of 18
Home colours	Away colours

Club Deportivo La Madalena de Morcín is a Spanish football club based in Morcín, Asturias.

== History ==
The team was founded in 2007. On 6 May 2018, Madalena promoted to Tercera División for the first time ever.

== Season to season ==
Season	Tier	Division	Place	Copa del Rey
2007–08	7	2ª Reg.	5th	
2008–09	7	2ª Reg.	2nd	
2009–10	7	2ª Reg.	2nd	
2010–11	6	1ª Reg.	12th	
2011–12	6	1ª Reg.	10th	
2012–13	6	1ª Reg.	8th	
2013–14	6	1ª Reg.	1st	
2014–15	5	Reg. Pref.	14th	
2015–16	5	Reg. Pref.	12th	
2016–17	5	Reg. Pref.	14th	
2017–18	5	Reg. Pref.	2nd	
2018–19	4	3ª	18th	
2019–20	5	Reg. Pref.	20th	
2020–21	5	Reg. Pref.	16th	
2021–22	6	Reg. Pref.	9th	
2022–23	7	2ª RFFPA	10th	
2023–24	7	2ª Astur.	6th	
2024–25	7	2ª Astur.	5th	
2025–26	7	2ª Astur.		

- 1 season in Tercera División

== Notable players ==
- (Equatorial Guinea) Kily Álvarez
