= SD Narcea =

Narcea
- Full name: Sociedad Deportiva Narcea
- Founded: 1963
- Ground: El Reguerón, Cangas del Narcea; Asturias, Spain
- Capacity: 1,200
- President: César Rodríguez García
- Head coach: Ricardo del Riego
- League: Segunda Asturfútbol – Group 1
- 2024–25: Segunda Asturfútbol – Group 2, 3rd of 18
Home colours	Away colours

Sociedad Deportiva Narcea is a Spanish football club based in Cangas del Narcea, in the autonomous community of Asturias.

== History ==
Founded in 1962, Narcea played always in Regional leagues until its first promotion to Tercera División in 1996. After six seasons in two streaks, the club declined and came back to the sixth tier.

== Stadium ==
Narcea plays its home games at Estadio El Reguerón, with a capacity for 1,200 spectators. In 2006, the pitch was replaced by one made of artificial turf and floodlights were installed.

== Season to season ==
Season	Tier	Division	Place	Copa del Rey
1963–64	5	2ª Reg.	7th	
1964–65	5	2ª Reg.	2nd	
1965–66	5	2ª Reg.	2nd	
1966–67	4	1ª Reg.	12th	
1967–68	4	1ª Reg.	6th	
1968–69	4	1ª Reg.	16th	
1969–70	4	1ª Reg.	7th	
1970–71	4	1ª Reg.	8th	
1971–72	4	1ª Reg.	7th	
1972–73	4	1ª Reg.	14th	
1973–74	4	Reg. Pref.	16th	
1974–75	4	Reg. Pref.	9th	
1975–76	4	Reg. Pref.	11th	
1976–77	4	Reg. Pref.	18th	
1977–78	5	Reg. Pref.	20th	
1978–79	6	1ª Reg.	17th	
1979–80	DNP			
1980–81	7	2ª Reg.	1st	
1981–82	6	1ª Reg.	10th	
1982–83	6	1ª Reg.	18th	

Season	Tier	Division	Place	Copa del Rey
1983–84	7	2ª Reg.	3rd	
1984–85	6	1ª Reg.	1st	
1985–86	5	Reg. Pref.	16th	
1986–87	5	Reg. Pref.	12th	
1987–88	5	Reg. Pref.	9th	
1988–89	5	Reg. Pref.	5th	
1989–90	5	Reg. Pref.	9th	
1990–91	5	Reg. Pref.	11th	
1991–92	5	Reg. Pref.	19th	
1992–93	6	1ª Reg.	1st	
1993–94	5	Reg. Pref.	7th	
1994–95	5	Reg. Pref.	6th	
1995–96	5	Reg. Pref.	3rd	
1996–97	4	3ª	17th	
1997–98	4	3ª	7th	
1998–99	4	3ª	12th	
1999–2000	4	3ª	19th	
2000–01	5	Reg. Pref.	1st	
2001–02	4	3ª	15th	
2002–03	4	3ª	17th	

Season	Tier	Division	Place	Copa del Rey
2003–04	5	Reg. Pref.	14th	
2004–05	5	Reg. Pref.	6th	
2005–06	5	Reg. Pref.	11th	
2006–07	5	Reg. Pref.	10th	
2007–08	5	Reg. Pref.	10th	
2008–09	5	Reg. Pref.	12th	
2009–10	5	Reg. Pref.	8th	
2010–11	5	Reg. Pref.	6th	
2011–12	5	Reg. Pref.	17th	
2012–13	5	Reg. Pref.	20th	
2013–14	6	1ª Reg.	6th	
2014–15	6	1ª Reg.	6th	
2015–16	6	1ª Reg.	7th	
2016–17	6	1ª Reg.	13th	
2017–18	6	1ª Reg.	10th	
2018–19	6	1ª Reg.	14th	
2019–20	6	1ª Reg.	6th	
2020–21	6	1ª Reg.	1st	
2021–22	7	1ª Reg.	3rd	
2022–23	7	2ª RFFPA	12th	

Season	Tier	Division	Place	Copa del Rey
2023–24	7	2ª Astur.	7th	
2024–25	7	2ª Astur.	3rd	
2025–26	7	2ª Astur.		

- 6 seasons in Tercera División
