= Ciañu =

- Parish
- Location within Spain
- Country: Spain
- Autonomous community: Asturias
- Province: Asturias
- Municipality: Langreo

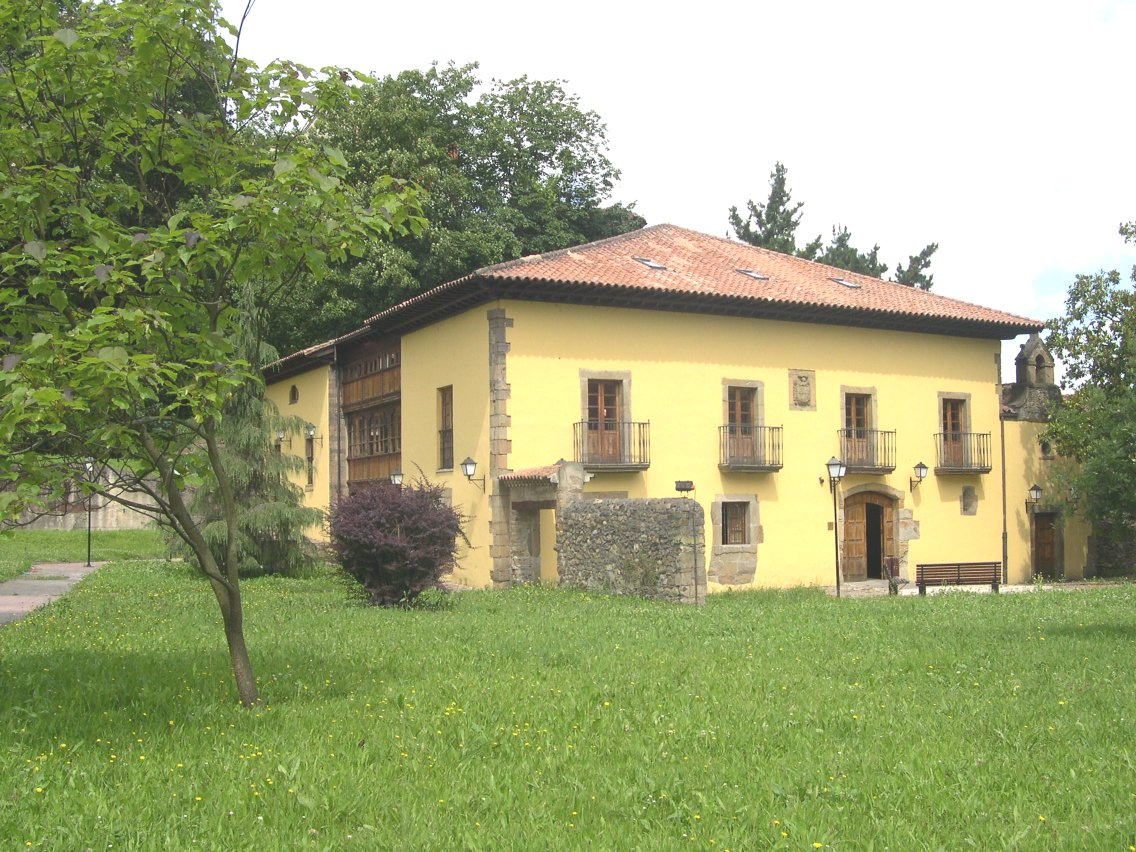
Casa la Buelga in Ciañu

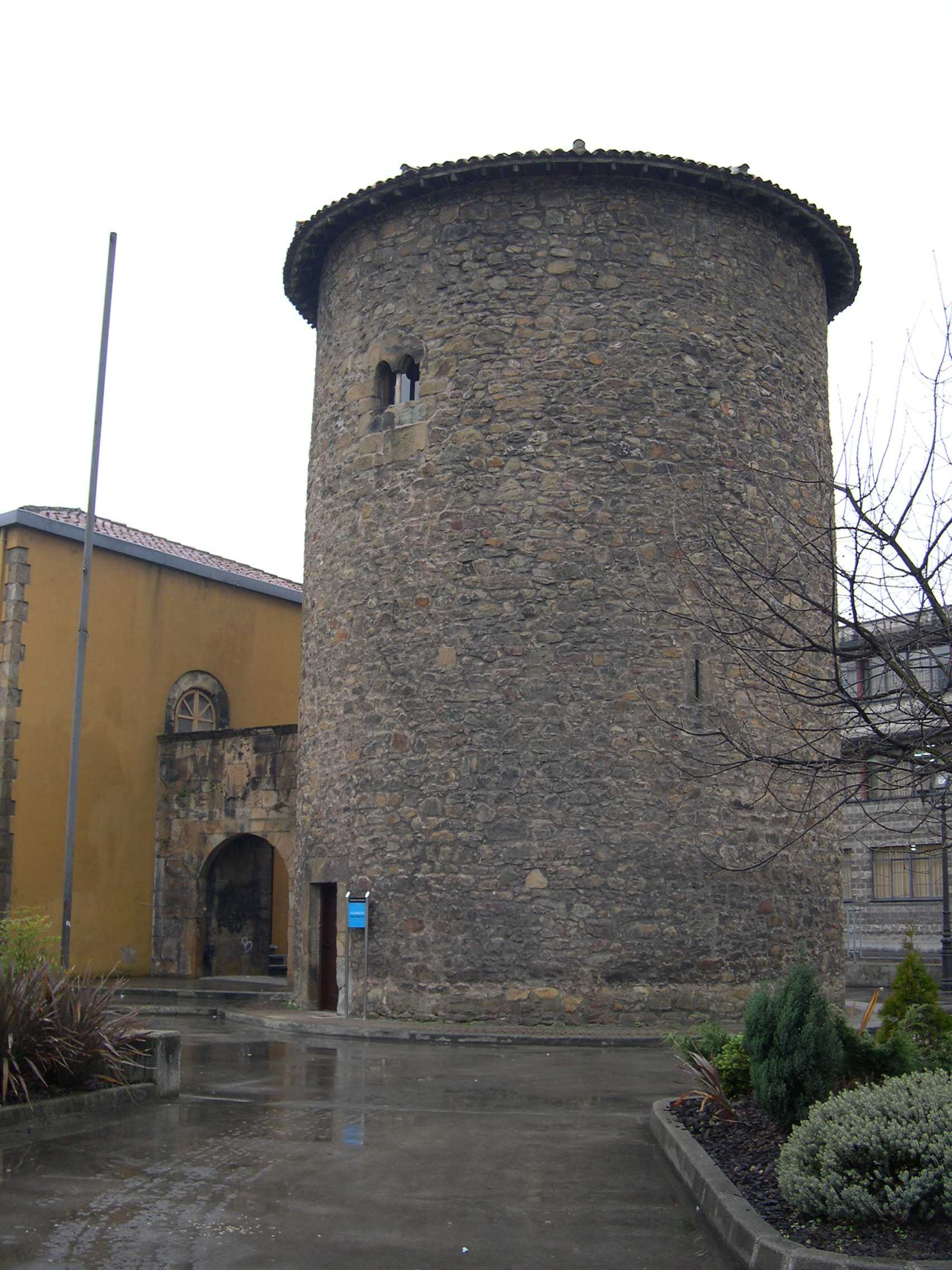
Tower in Ciañu

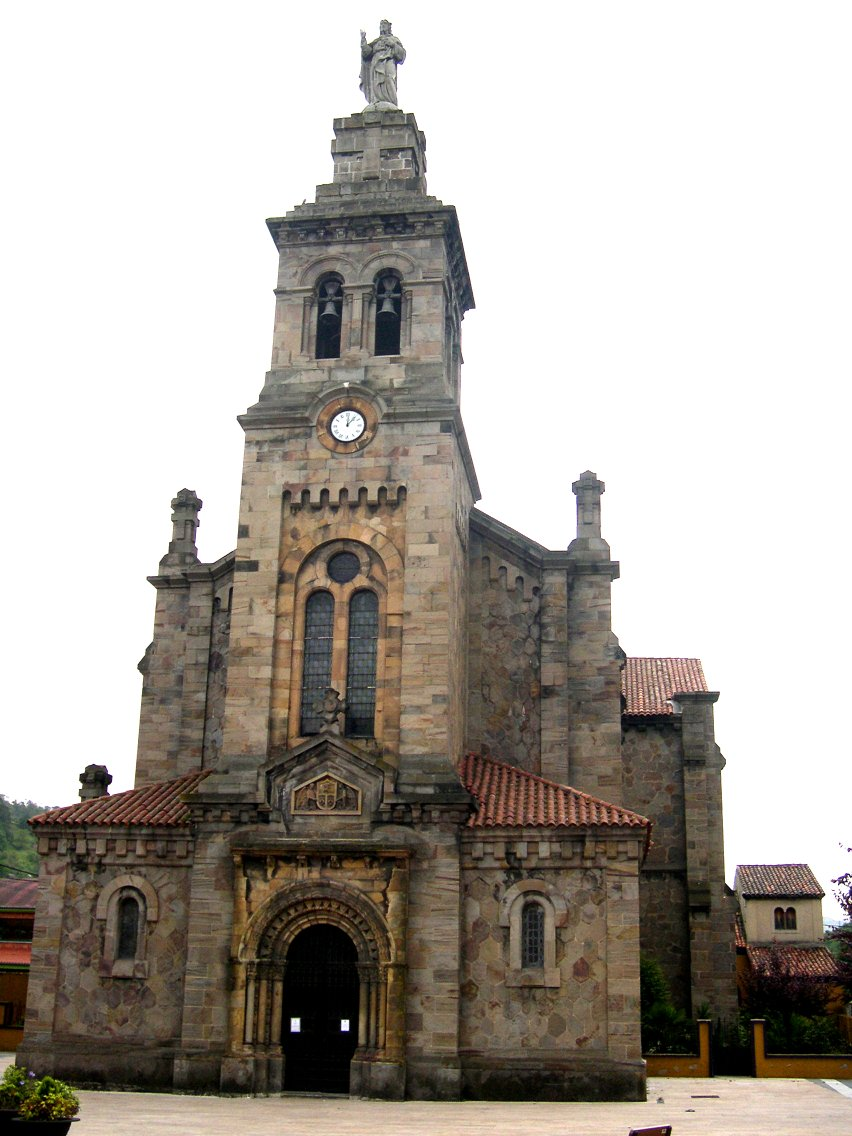
Church in Ciañu

Ciañu is one of eight parishes (administrative divisions) in Langreo, a municipality within the province and autonomous community of Asturias, in northern Spain.

== History ==
In the 16th century, the parish was the economic center of Langreo. The name Ciañu stems from Latin Civitatis angulum "The corner of the city." Its medieval origin means that today it has many historical buildings, including the Romanesque doorways of the church of San Esteban, from the twelfth century. For this reason, the administrative tasks of the council were located in Ciaño until they were transferred to Sama de Langreo.

In the 19th century, coal mining industry began to develop in the area, and Ciañu was one of the most prosperous centers thanks to the exploitation of hard coal. In the mid-twentieth century numerous working-class neighborhoods were built in the town, such as Pompián, Tras el Canto, San José and San Esteban. The parish of Ciañu had many mining operations, including three large shafts: the María Luisa (which gives its name to the well-known mining song En el Pozo Maria Luisa/Santa Bárbara Bendita "In Maria Luisa Well/Blessed Santa Barbara"), the San Luis and the Samuño shaft. In the Samuño Valley is the Mining Ecomuseum, whose tour can be done in a tourist train that enters a gallery of the aforementioned San Luis shaft, which can be visited.

The parish of Ciañu had more than 10,000 inhabitants in 1960, of which almost 7,000 lived in the urban area. Due to this, Ciaño had several schools, among them La Salle, a cinema, stores, several commissaries, and more.

The urban district of Ciañu, which together with Riañu, Lada, Barros, Sama and La Felguera make up the city of Langreo, is crossed by the Nalón River and its tributary, the Samuño. The town has two railway stations, in the C-2 and C-5 lines, a food market, two cultural centers, a public school, a day care center, and a high school and vocational training institute, as well as the headquarters of Sadim. It also houses the Nalón chemical plant. However, the industrial reconversion crisis in the mining basins caused Ciañu to lose its demographic weight and many of its services. It celebrates its annual Corpus Christi festivities and feast days dedicated to callos. Numerous routes such as Samuño and Los Molinos cross the rural territory.

== List of towns ==
- L'Armá
- La Barraca
- La Cabaña
- Cabaños
- El Cau
- El Cadavíu
- La Caleya
- La Campa
- La Canga
- El Cantu Trichuru
- La Capilla
- El Carbayal
- El Carbayu
- Cardiñuezo
- La Casa Baxo
- La Casa'l Medio
- Casielles
- La Casona
- Les Casuques
- El Centenal
- El Corralón
- Corros
- Les Cubes
- Les Cuestes
- L'Escobal
- Felguera
- Los Fornos
- Foyeo
- El Fresneal
- La Fernosa
- Les Hedreres
- La Enverniza
- La Llimosnera
- El Yanu
- La Moquina
- La Mosquitera
- El Navaliigu
- La Nueva
- Omedines
- Otones
- Pampiedra
- Paniciri
- La Payega
- La Peña Utiillu
- La Perallonga
- El Picu Castillu
- El Pasaúriu
- La Polla
- El Pozobal
- La Puente Umeru
- El Pumarón
- El Rebullu
- Roíles
- La Roza
- San Roque
- El Sestu
- Los Tablones
- La Tixera
- El Tendiyón
- La Tixuca
- El Trichuru
- El Túnel
- La Vallina
- Viesques
- La Xuga
- L'Azorera
- El Carril
- La Ceposa
- La Cuesta la Viña
- El Nadal
- El Praón
- Pumarín
- Santana
- Los Valles
- Cogorderos
- La Tiyera
- La Capilla Cabaños
- La Trechora
- Les Coes
- El Pibidal
- La Puente Cabrón
- El Respolón
- El Tixucu
- La Traba
- La Trapa
- Traselcantu
- L'Utiillu Baxo
- L'Utiillu Riba
