= Berrón CF =

Berrón
- Full name: Berrón Club de Fútbol
- Founded: 1969
- Ground: Sergio Sánchez, El Berrón, Siero; Asturias, Spain
- Capacity: 3,000
- President: Pedro Riesgo
- Head coach: Mario Sánchez
- League: Tercera Asturfútbol – Group 2
- 2024–25: Segunda Asturfútbol – Group 1, 17th of 18 (relegated)
- Website: www.berroncf.es
Home colours	Away colours

Berrón Club de Fútbol is a Spanish football club based in El Berrón, Siero, in the autonomous community of Asturias.

== History ==
Founded in 1969, Berrón made their debut in Tercera División in 1993, only remaining one season. The club came back to the fourth tier and played two more seasons between 2004 and 2006 before being relegated again to the Regional leagues.

== Stadium ==
Berrón plays its games at the Estadio Sergio Sánchez, with natural grass and renamed after the death of the 18-year old player during a training with the club.

The facilities have another pitch of artificial turf for its reserve and youth teams, inaugurated in 2016.

== Season to season ==
Season	Tier	Division	Place	Copa del Rey
1970–71	5	2ª Reg.	13th	
1971–72	5	2ª Reg.	9th	
1972–73	5	2ª Reg.	8th	
1973–74	6	2ª Reg.	6th	
1974–75	6	2ª Reg.	10th	
1975–76	6	2ª Reg.	5th	
1976–77	6	2ª Reg.	6th	
1977–78	7	2ª Reg.	9th	
1978–79	7	2ª Reg.	3rd	
1979–80	7	2ª Reg.	3rd	
1980–81	7	2ª Reg.	2nd	
1981–82	6	1ª Reg.	6th	
1982–83	6	1ª Reg.	12th	
1983–84	6	1ª Reg.	12th	
1984–85	7	2ª Reg.	1st	
1985–86	6	1ª Reg.	15th	
1986–87	6	1ª Reg.	14th	
1987–88	6	1ª Reg.	9th	
1988–89	6	1ª Reg.	2nd	
1989–90	5	Reg. Pref.	13th	

Season	Tier	Division	Place	Copa del Rey
1990–91	5	Reg. Pref.	5th	
1991–92	5	Reg. Pref.	7th	
1992–93	5	Reg. Pref.	3rd	
1993–94	4	3ª	18th	
1994–95	5	Reg. Pref.	13th	
1995–96	5	Reg. Pref.	20th	
1996–97	6	1ª Reg.	11th	
1997–98	6	1ª Reg.	4th	
1998–99	5	Reg. Pref.	9th	
1999–2000	5	Reg. Pref.	13th	
2000–01	5	Reg. Pref.	16th	
2001–02	5	Reg. Pref.	6th	
2002–03	5	Reg. Pref.	11th	
2003–04	5	Reg. Pref.	3rd	
2004–05	4	3ª	16th	
2005–06	4	3ª	19th	
2006–07	5	Reg. Pref.	14th	
2007–08	5	Reg. Pref.	18th	
2008–09	6	1ª Reg.	2nd	
2009–10	5	Reg. Pref.	20th	

Season	Tier	Division	Place	Copa del Rey
2010–11	6	1ª Reg.	5th	
2011–12	6	1ª Reg.	6th	
2012–13	6	1ª Reg.	4th	
2013–14	6	1ª Reg.	7th	
2014–15	6	1ª Reg.	2nd	
2016–17	5	Reg. Pref.	16th	
2016–17	5	Reg. Pref.	20th	
2017–18	6	1ª Reg.	1st	
2018–19	5	Reg. Pref.	17th	
2019–20	5	Reg. Pref.	12th	
2020–21	5	Reg. Pref.	5th	
2021–22	6	Reg. Pref.	3rd	
2022–23	6	1ª RFFPA	11th	
2023–24	6	1ª Astur.	17th	
2024–25	7	2ª Astur.	17th	
2025–26	8	3ª Astur.		

- 3 seasons in Tercera División
