= Álvaro de Navia-Osorio y Vigil =

Spanish diplomat, general and author (1684-1732)

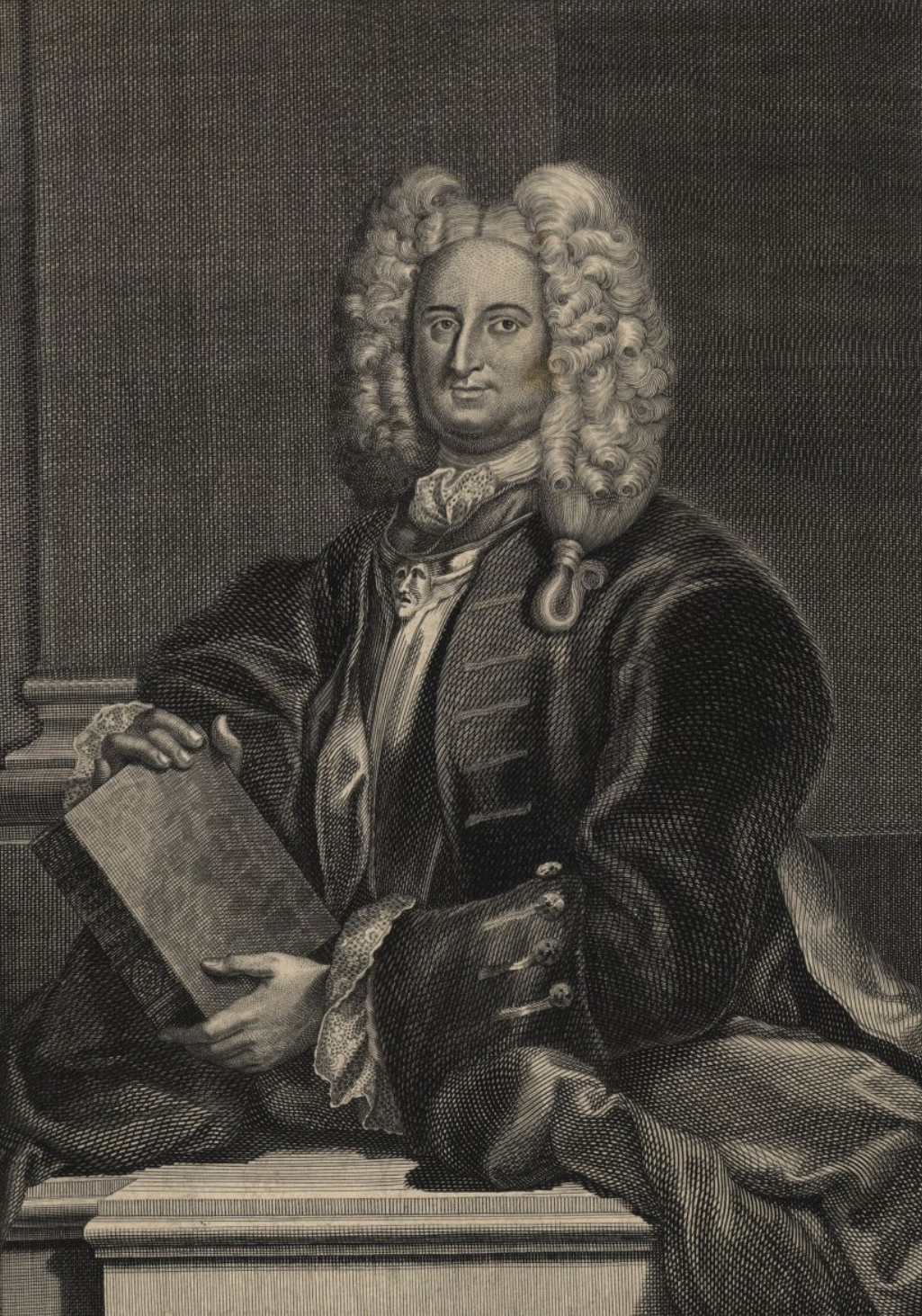
Don Álvaro Navia-Osorio y Vigil.

Álvaro de Navia-Osorio y Vigil, 3rd Marquis of Santa Cruz de Marcenado and Viscount of Puerto, born in 1684 in Puerto de Vega in Asturias, Spain; killed in action near Oran in North Africa in 1732, was a Spanish diplomat, general, and author. At the time of his death in battle fighting off an attack by Ottoman forces in 1732 he was governor of the Spanish possession of Oran in North Africa.

He in resided in Turin (1722-1727) and was Spanish Ambassador in France (1727-1730). He represented Spain in the Congress of Soissons (1728-1729).

Between 1726 and 1730, Santa Cruz de Marcenado wrote seven volumes of Military Reflections, published in Turin and Paris. One volume deals specifically with the prevention of insurgencies and counter-insurgency campaigns. Santa Cruz was probably the earliest author who gave systematic attention to this subject.

He was married three times and was the father of María Francisca Irene de Navia y Bellet, who was a relatively famous poet that wrote in Latin and Spanish.

== Works ==
- For a translation of excerpts of his Reflexiones Militares (Turin: Juan Francisco Mairesse, 1724–1727 and Paris: Simon Langlois, 1730) into English, see Beatrice Heuser: The Strategy Makers: Thoughts on War and Society from Machiavelli to Clausewitz (Santa Monica, CA: Greenwood/Praeger, 2010), ISBN 978-0-275-99826-4, pp. 124–146
