= CD Tineo =

Spanish football club

Tineo
- Full name: Club Deportivo Tineo
- Founded: 31 May 1965; 61 years ago
- Stadium: Campo Municipal de San Roque
- Capacity: 1,000
- President: Senén González Lobato
- Head coach: Froilán
- League: Primera Asturfútbol
- 2025–26: Primera Asturfútbol, 15th of 19
- Website: clubdeportivotineo.es
Home colours	Away colours

Club Deportivo Tineo is a Spanish football club based in Tineo, in the autonomous community of Asturias.

== History ==
Founded in 1965, CD Tineo played its entire history in the Regional divisions until it was promoted for the first time to the Tercera División in May 2015.

== Season to season ==
Season	Level	Division	Place	Copa del Rey
1965–66	5	2ª Reg.	3rd	
1966–67	5	2ª Reg.	7th	
1967–68	5	2ª Reg.	3rd	
1968–69	5	2ª Reg.	1st	
1969–70	4	1ª Reg.	4th	
1970–71	4	1ª Reg.	7th	
1971–72	4	1ª Reg.	14th	
1972–73	4	1ª Reg.	13th	
1973–74	4	1ª Reg.	19th	
1974–75	5	2ª Reg. P.	18th	
1975–1979	DNP			
1979–80	7	2ª Reg.	7th	
1980–81	7	2ª Reg.	8th	
1981–82	7	2ª Reg.	1st	
1982–83	6	1ª Reg.	7th	
1983–84	6	1ª Reg.	14th	
1984–85	7	2ª Reg.	6th	
1985–86	6	1ª Reg.	4th	
1986–87	5	Reg. Pref.	6th	
1987–88	5	Reg. Pref.	14th	

Season	Level	Division	Place	Copa del Rey
1988–89	5	Reg. Pref.	18th	
1989–90	6	1ª Reg.	15th	
1990–91	6	1ª Reg.	7th	
1991–92	6	1ª Reg.	6th	
1992–93	6	1ª Reg.	3rd	
1993–94	5	Reg. Pref.	16th	
1994–95	5	Reg. Pref.	19th	
1995–96	6	1ª Reg.	13th	
1996–97	6	1ª Reg.	8th	
1997–98	6	1ª Reg.	7th	
1998–99	6	1ª Reg.	15th	
1999–2000	7	2ª Reg.	3rd	
2000–01	7	2ª Reg.	1st	
2001–02	6	1ª Reg.	4th	
2002–03	6	1ª Reg.	9th	
2003–04	6	1ª Reg.	6th	
2004–05	6	1ª Reg.	3rd	
2005–06	5	Reg. Pref.	14th	
2006–07	5	Reg. Pref.	12th	
2007–08	5	Reg. Pref.	14th	

Season	Level	Division	Place	Copa del Rey
2008–09	5	Reg. Pref.	4th	
2009–10	5	Reg. Pref.	10th	
2010–11	5	Reg. Pref.	4th	
2011–12	5	Reg. Pref.	8th	
2012–13	5	Reg. Pref.	10th	
2013–14	5	Reg. Pref.	11th	
2014–15	5	Reg. Pref.	3rd	
2015–16	4	3ª	15th	
2016–17	4	3ª	18th	
2017–18	5	Reg. Pref.	13th	
2018–19	5	Reg. Pref.	7th	
2019–20	5	Reg. Pref.	17th	
2020–21	5	Reg. Pref.	5th	
2021–22	6	Reg. Pref.	4th	
2022–23	6	1ª RFFPA	18th	
2023–24	7	2ª Astur.	8th	
2024–25	7	2ª Astur.	4th	
2024–25	7	2ª Astur.	6th	
2025–26	6	1ª Ast.		

- 2 seasons in Tercera División
