= Atlético de Lugones SD =

Spanish football club

Atlético de Lugones
- Full name: Atlético de Lugones Sociedad Deportiva
- Founded: 2003; 23 years ago
- Ground: Santa Bárbara, Lugones, Asturias, Spain
- Capacity: 2,000
- Chairman: Víctor González Castañón
- Manager: Marcos Pool
- League: Segunda Asturfútbol – Group 2
- 2024–25: Segunda Asturfútbol – Group 1, 14th of 18
Home colours	Away colours

Atlético de Lugones Sociedad Deportiva is a Spanish football club based in Lugones in the autonomous community of Asturias. Founded in 2003, they play in Segunda Asturfútbol – Group 2, holding home matches at Estadio Santa Bárbara.

== History ==
The first Atlético de Lugones CF was founded in 1905, but the current club was created in 2003 after the dissolution of the old club. It also has a track and field section.

The club was promoted to Tercera División for the first time in 2012.

== Season to season ==
Season	Tier	Division	Place	Copa del Rey
2003–04	7	2ª Reg.	2nd	
2004–05	7	2ª Reg.	1st	
2005–06	6	1ª Reg.	3rd	
2006–07	6	1ª Reg.	1st	
2007–08	5	Reg. Pref.	10th	
2008–09	5	Reg. Pref.	5th	
2009–10	5	Reg. Pref.	6th	
2010–11	5	Reg. Pref.	5th	
2011–12	5	Reg. Pref.	2nd	
2012–13	4	3ª	17th	
2013–14	4	3ª	13th	
2014–15	4	3ª	10th	
2015–16	4	3ª	12th	
2016–17	4	3ª	17th	
2017–18	4	3ª	19th	
2018–19	5	Reg. Pref.	10th	
2019–20	5	Reg. Pref.	8th	
2020–21	5	Reg. Pref.	3rd	
2021–22	6	Reg. Pref.	2nd	
2022–23	6	1ª RFFPA	5th	Preliminary

Season	Tier	Division	Place	Copa del Rey
2023–24	6	1ª Astur.	18th	First round
2024–25	7	2ª Astur.	14th	
2025–26	7	2ª Astur.		

- 6 seasons in Tercera División
