= Morea, Aller =

Parish in Aller, Asturias, Spain

Morea Moreda
- Parish
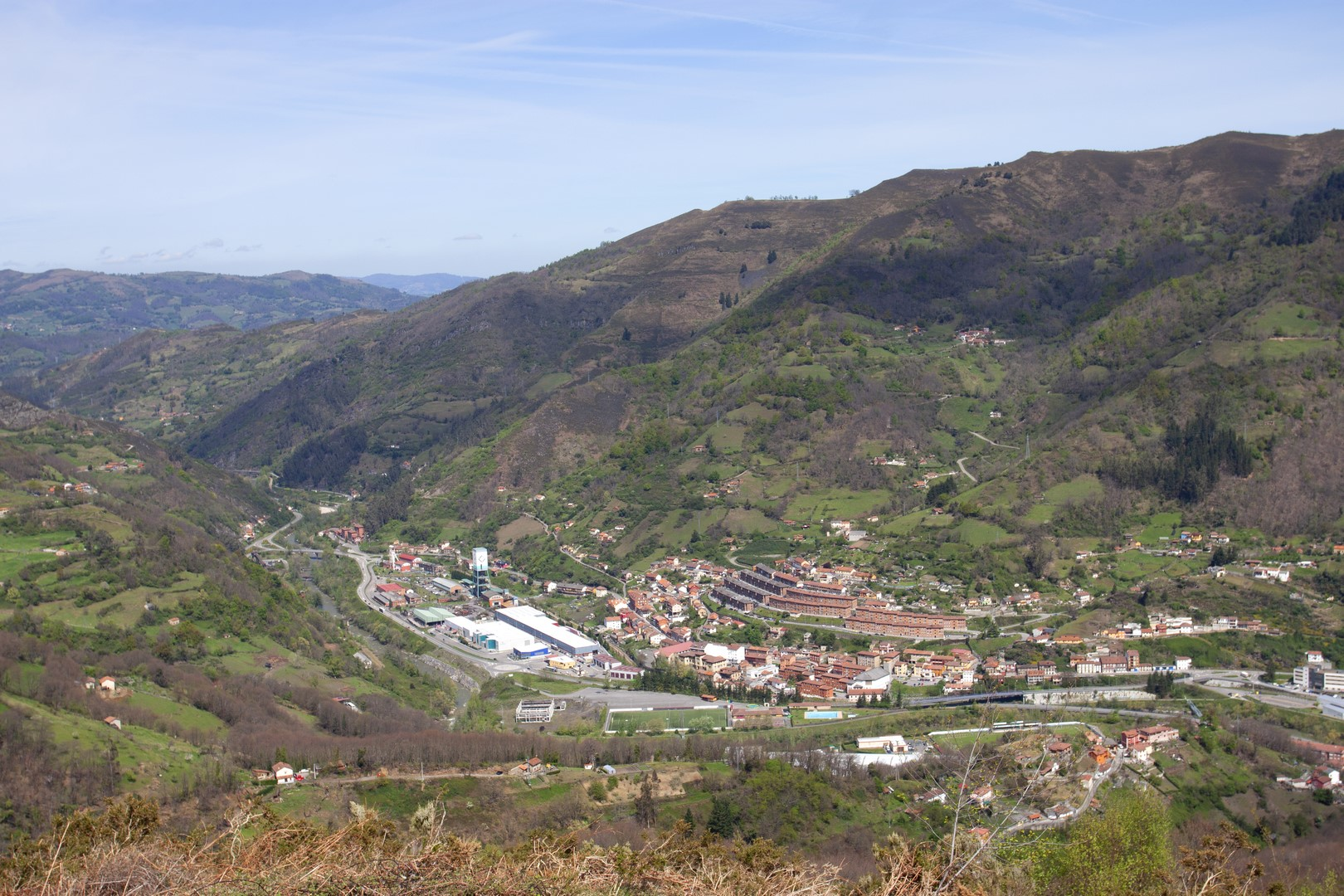

- Location within Spain
- Coordinates: 43.16828°N 5.73868°W
- Country: Spain
- Autonomous community: Asturias
- Province: Asturias
- Municipality: Aller

Area
  - Total: 27.98 km^{2} (10.80 sq mi)

Population (2024)
  - Total: 3,962
  - Density: 141.6/km^{2} (366.7/sq mi)
- Time zone: UTC+1 (CET)
  - Summer (DST): UTC+2 (CEST)

Morea (Spanish name: Moreda, and officially Morea / Moreda) is one of 18 parishes (administrative divisions) in Aller, a municipality within the province and autonomous community of Asturias, in northern Spain.

The altitude 300 m (980 ft) above sea level. It is 27.98 km^{2} (10.80 sq mi) in size with a population of 3,962 as of January 1, 2024.

== Villages ==
- Les Ferraes
- Campera
- El Caleyu
- La Barraca
- El Campo
- La Viñona
- El Carmen
- San Isidro
- Sotiello
- Tartiere
- Caleyón
