= Jove, Gijón =

Coordinates: 43°32′56″N 5°42′10″W

Jove/Xove: Jove (Spanish) Xove (Asturian)
- Neighbourhood, formerly Parish
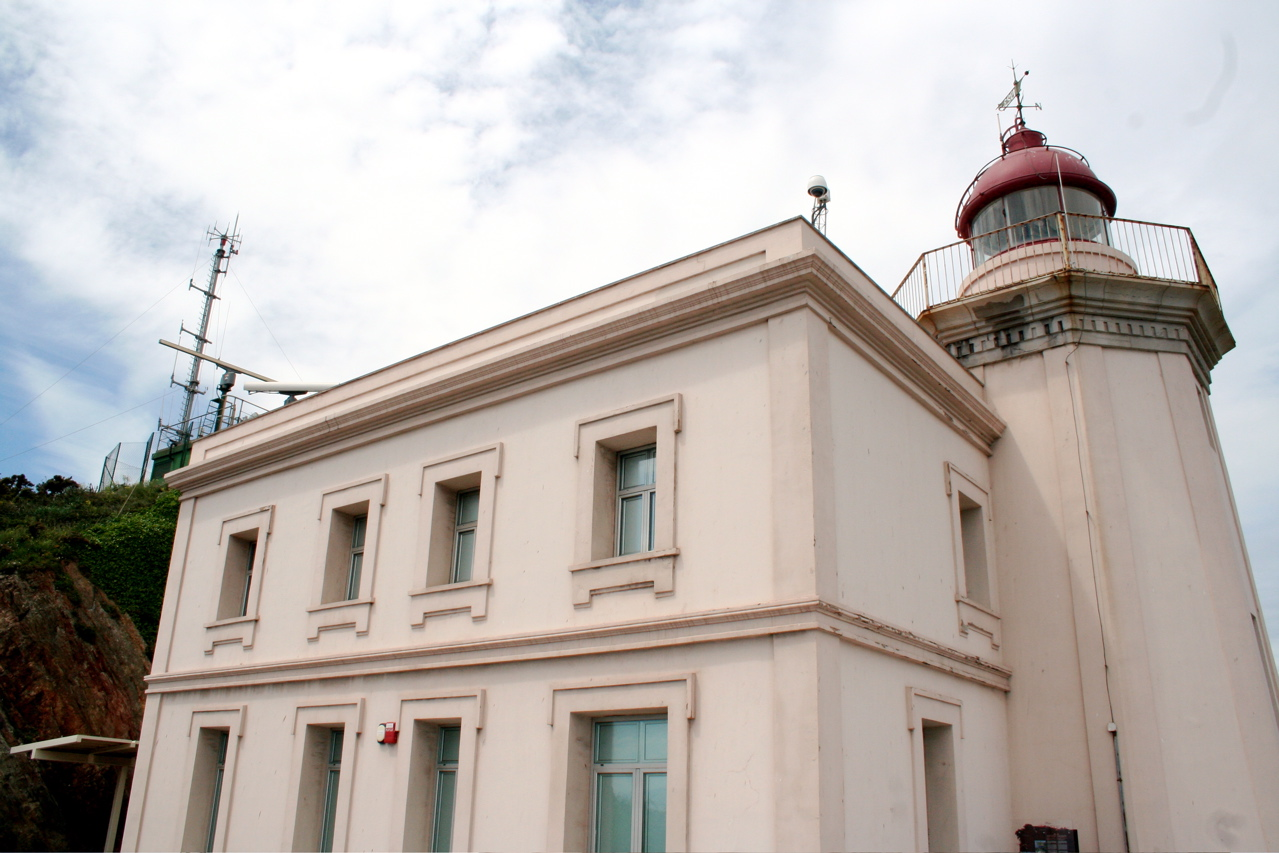
- Lighthouse in Campa Torres
- Interactive map of Jove/Xove
- Country: Spain
- Autonomous community: Asturias
- Province: Asturias
- Municipality: Gijón

Population (2016)
  - Total: 3,318

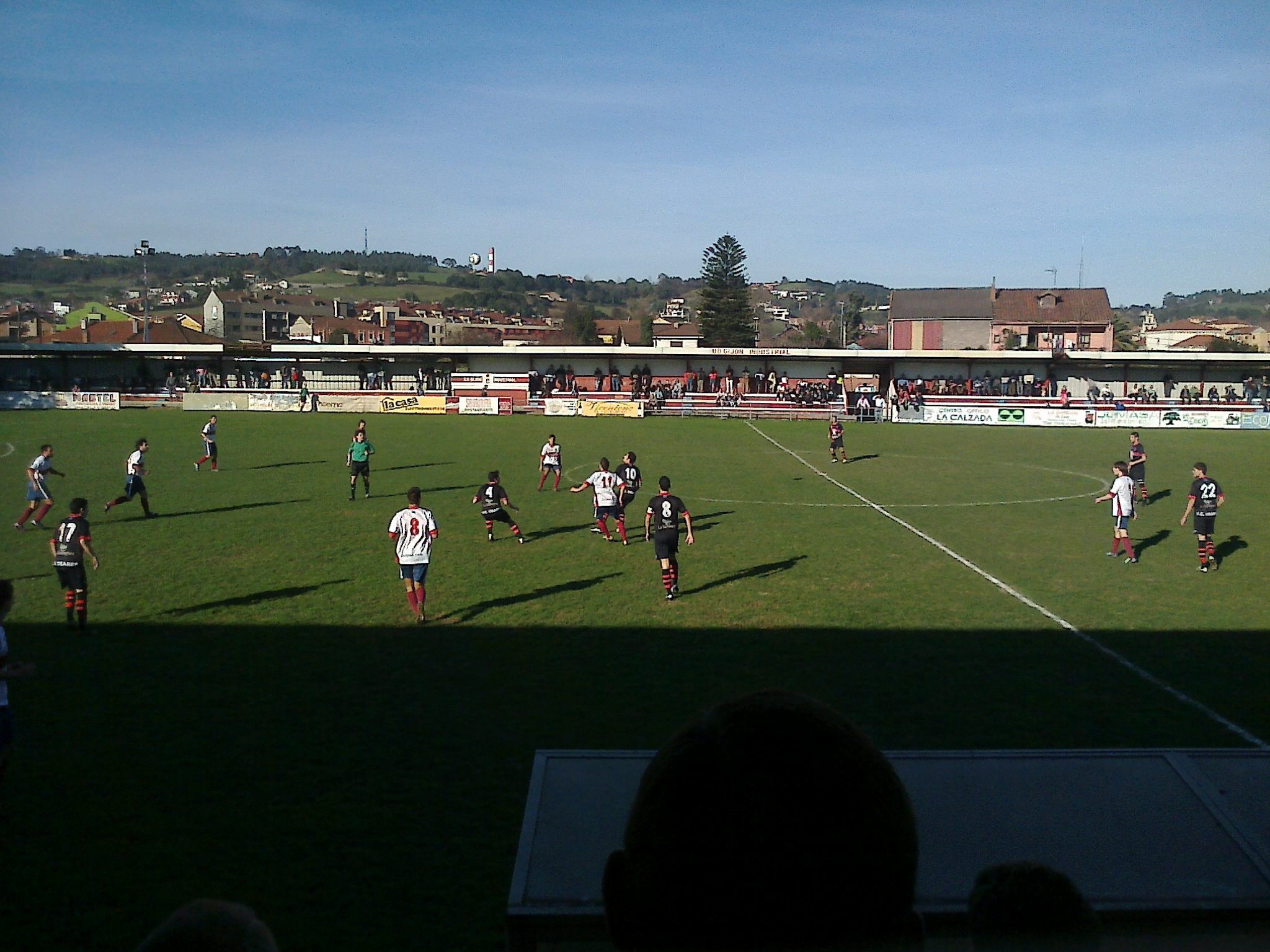
Estadio Santa Cruz, home of UD Gijón Industrial.

Jove or Xove is one of the twenty-six parishes within the municipality of Gijón, in Asturias, Spain, part of the West district of the city.

Previously to be integrated in Gijón, Roces was one of the historical parishes of the city.

Its population was 1,579 in 1995 and grew to 3,189 in 2012.

Jove is located on the western coast of Gijón. It borders the city in the east, and with the municipality of Carreño in the west.

El Musel port is located in this district.

== Points of interest ==
In addition to El Musel port, in the Campa Torres (the highest point of Jove), is the archaeological park where there are still remains of Oppidum Noega, the first important settlement in Gijón.

Jove is also the seat of UD Gijón Industrial, football team which currently plays in Tercera División.

== Barrios and places ==
- Jove / Xove
- Rubín
- Xove de Riba
- Les Cabañes
- El Muselín
- Portuarios
