= Mieres del Camín (Asturias) =

Coordinates: 43.25°N 5.766667°W

- Parish
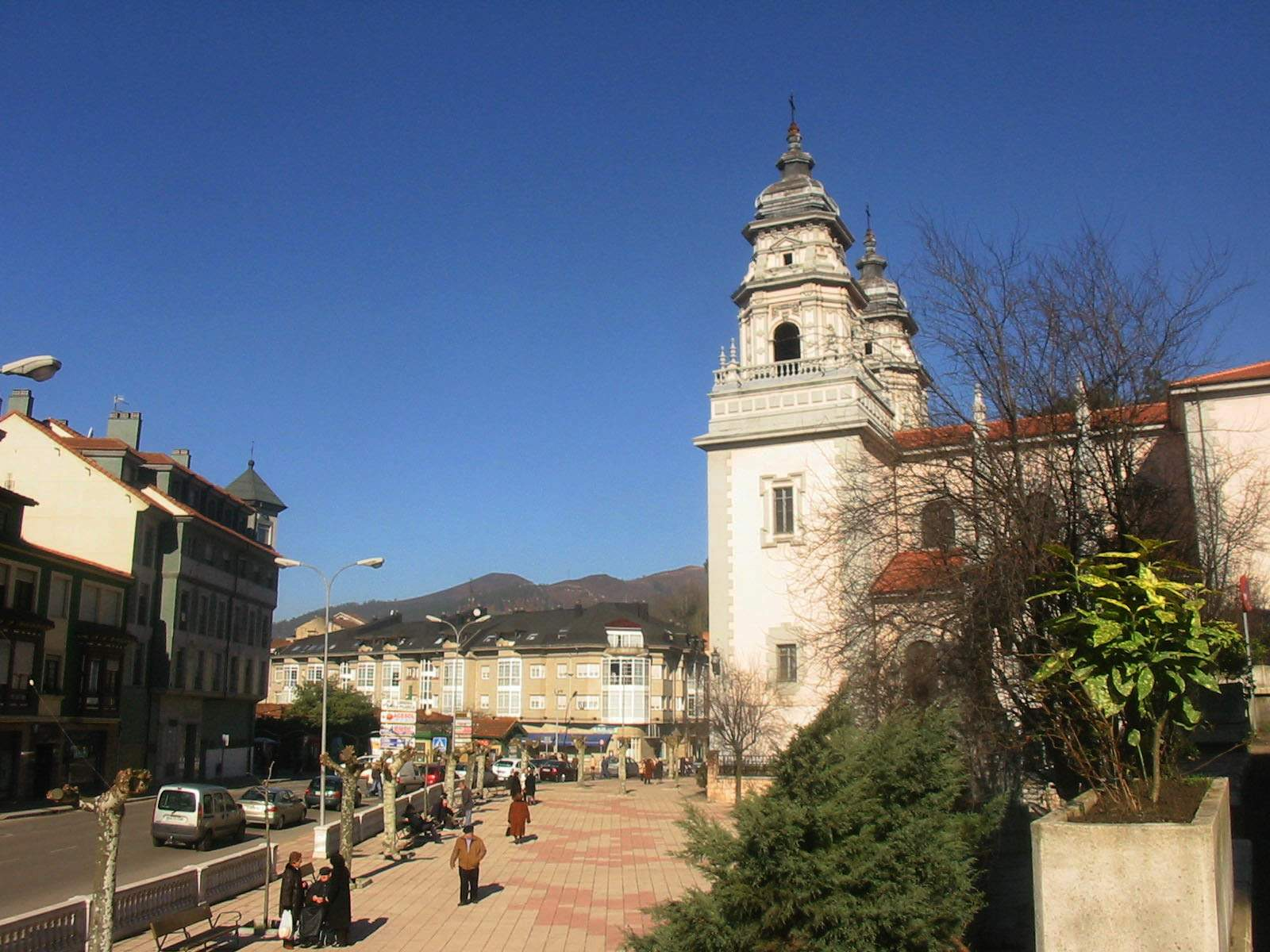
- San Juan church

- Country: Spain
- Autonomous community: Asturias
- Province: Asturias
- Municipality: Mieres

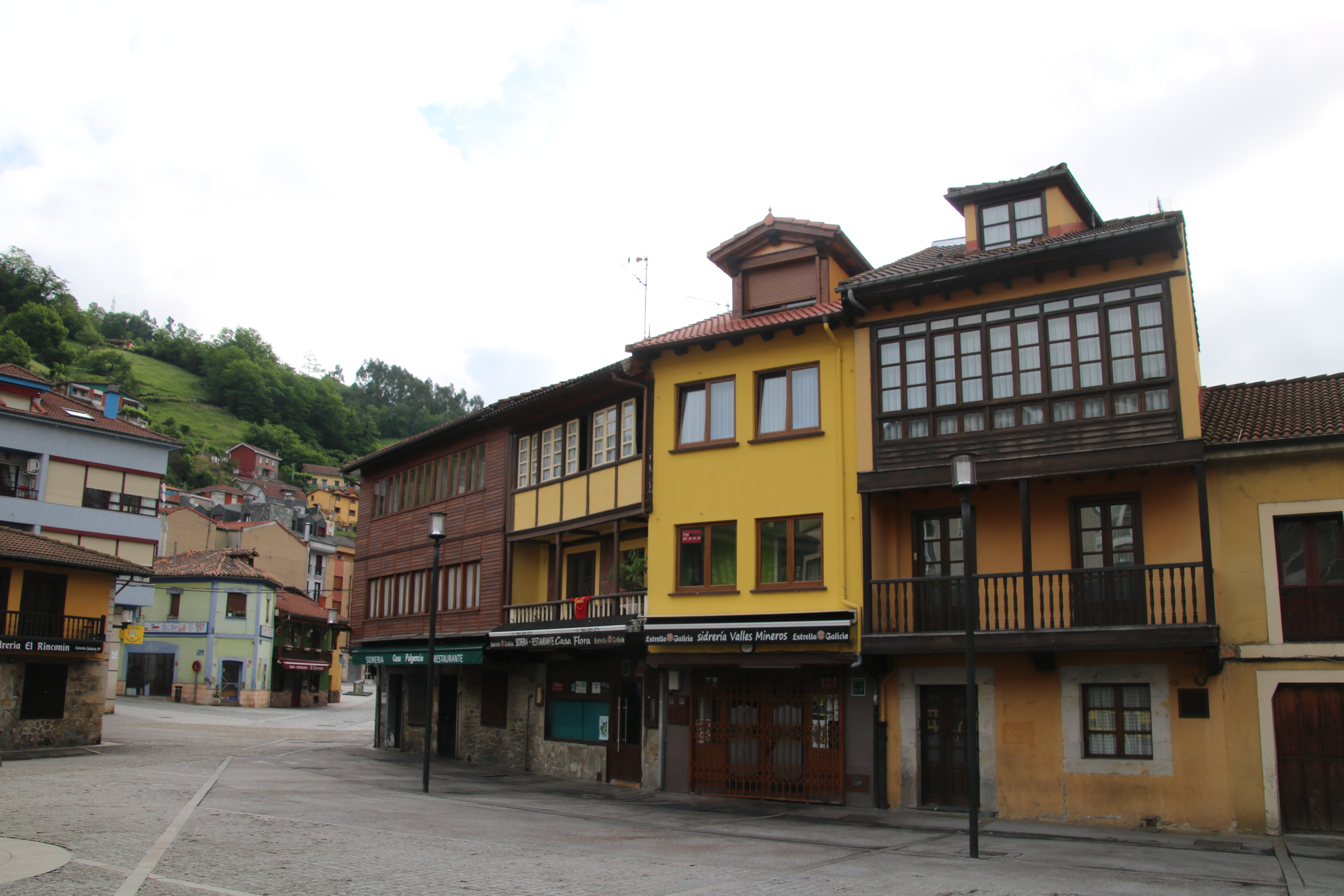
Requexu Square

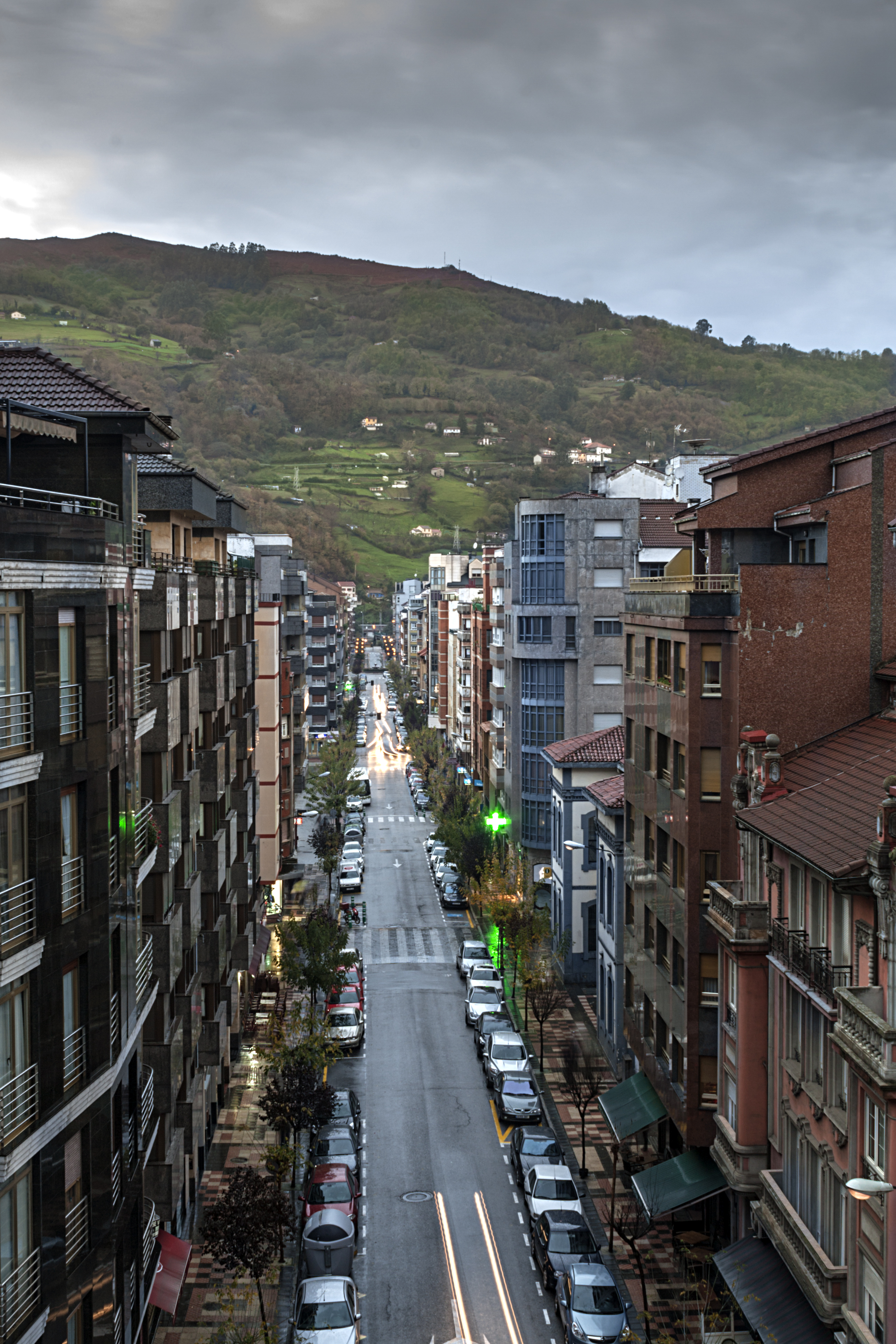
Mieres city centre

Mieres del Camín is a Parish and a town in Mieres, a municipality within the province and autonomous community of Asturias, in northern Spain.

It is located in a valley, flanked by mountains along the banks of the Caudal River (Rio Caudal) and Route 66 in the center of Asturias. Mieres has a hodgepodge of small museums, cultural centers, art galleries and numerous restaurant–bars, boutiques and shops. The highest concentration of shopping is located along Manuel Llanez street and the pedestrian mall La Vega street. The cities of Oviedo and Gijón are not so far, connected with Mieres by bus line, and commuter rail lines of Renfe. Mieres. A campus of University of Oviedo is located in the town, Campus de Barredo.

== Important buildings ==
- Town Hall
- Market
- Barredo Mine
- St. John's church
- Requexu Square
- Culture House
- Jovellanos Park
- Holy Family church
- Basque-Asturian Railway ancient station
- La villa old town
