= St. Ignatius College, Oviedo =

St. Ignatius College
- Spanish: Colegio San Ignacio

Location
- Av. Richard Grandío; Oviedo, Asturias; Spain
- Coordinates: 43°20′31.58″N 5°52′12.59″W

Information
- Type: Private through state-financed school primary and secondary school
- Religious affiliation: Catholic
- Denomination: Jesuit
- Patron saint: Ignatius Loyola
- Established: 1917; 109 years ago
- Administrator: Inocencio Martín Vicente
- Director: Gonzalo Lasa
- Principal: Mercedes García
- Grades: K-12, including baccalaureate
- Gender: Co-educational
- Website: www.s-ignacio.com

St. Ignatius College (Spanish: Colegio San Ignacio) is a private through state-financed Catholic primary and secondary school, located in Oviedo, in the historical autonomous community of Asturias, Spain. The school was founded by the Society of Jesus in 1917. The work of the Jesuits in Oviedo began in the 17th century and has continued since then.

== History ==
Colegio San Ignacio, Oviedo, dates from 1917. It began on Fifth Roel in Oviedo where it remained until the expulsion of the Jesuits during the Second Republic. In 1958 the Preparatory School opened on Cervantes Street in Oviedo. In 1973, it moved to the outskirts of Oviedo.

== Sport ==
In 2016, the girls' volleyball team won first place in a country-wide tournament held in Valladolid, and after winning several other regional tournaments came in second in the national finals.

Besides, the institution extra-officially supports Real Oviedo's football team.

== See also ==
- Catholic Church in Spain
- Education in Spain
- List of Jesuit schools
