= Roces, Gijón =

Roces
- Neighbourhood, formerly Parish
- Interactive map of Roces
- Country: Spain
- Autonomous community: Asturias
- Province: Asturias
- Municipality: Gijón

Population (2016)
  - Total: 4,627

Roces is a neighbourhood of the municipality of Gijón / Xixón, in Asturias, Spain. Its population was 2,858 in 1994 and due to the municipal rezoning, it grew to 7,526 in 2012.

Previously to be integrated in Gijón, Roces was one of the historical parishes of the city.

== Neighbourhoods and places ==
El Barrio la Iglesia
La Braña
Los Caleros
La Fana

- El Puentín

Machacón
Montevil
La Nozaleda
La Perdiz
El Recuestu
Valles
