= Santolaya (Morcín) =

Parish in Morcín, Spain

- Parish
- Location within Spain
- Coordinates: 43.316667°N 5.816667°W
- Country: Spain
- Autonomous community: Asturias
- Province: Asturias
- Municipality: Morcín

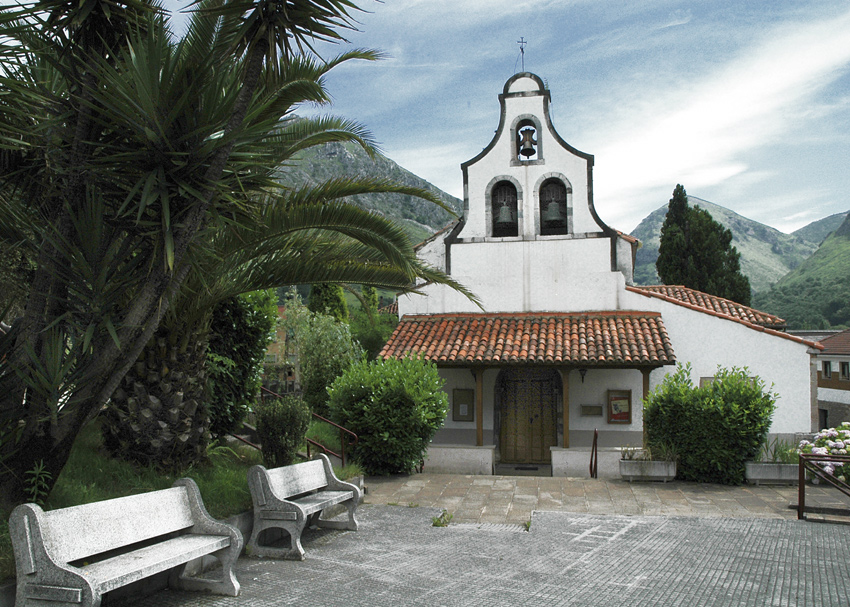
Church of Santolaya in Morcín.

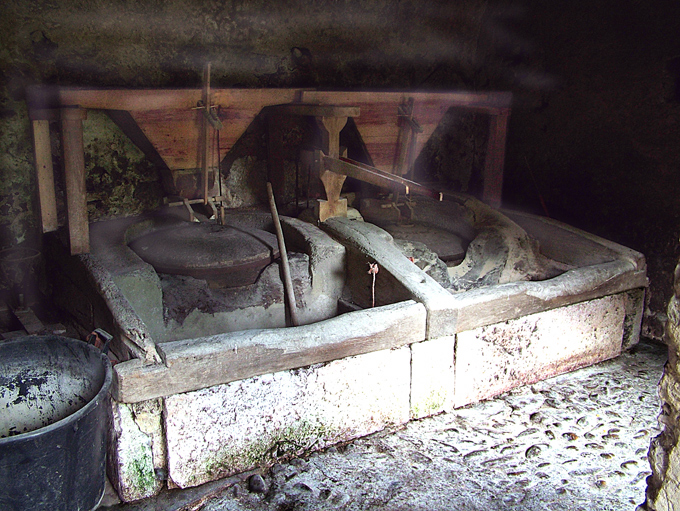
Old structures in Santolaya.

Santolaya is one of seven parishes (administrative divisions) in Morcín, a municipality within the province and autonomous community of Asturias, in northern Spain.

== Villages ==
- Les Bolíes
- El Brañuitu
- Calvín
- Figares
- La Llorera
- Malpica
- La Partayera
- Santolaya
- Les Vallines
- El Molín de Figares
