= Caborana =

Village and parish in Asturias, Spain

- Parish
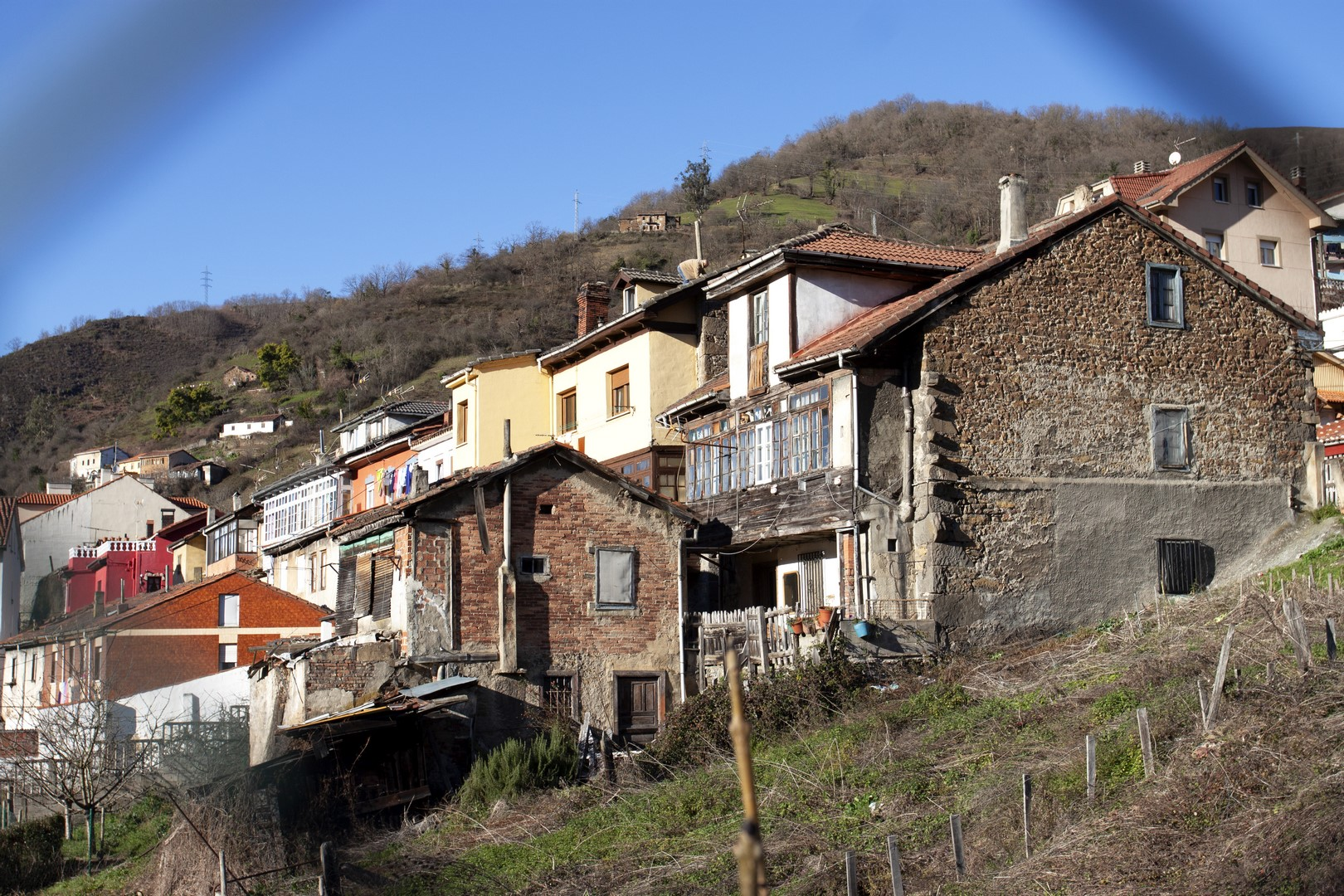

- Location within Spain
- Coordinates: 43°11′N 5°45′W
- Country: Spain
- Autonomous community: Asturias
- Province: Asturias
- Municipality: Aller

Area
  - Total: 3.3 km^{2} (1.3 sq mi)

Population (2024)
  - Total: 1,085
  - Density: 330/km^{2} (850/sq mi)
- Time zone: UTC+1 (CET)
  - Summer (DST): UTC+2 (CEST)

Caborana is a village and parish in Aller, a municipality within the province and autonomous community of Asturias, in northern Spain. Its population was 1,085 as of January 1, 2024.

== Villages ==
- Buciello
- El Cantiquín
- Caborana
- Los Collados
- Conveniencia
- Cuarteles del Segundo
- Cuarteles Nuevos
- Cuarteles Viejos
- Legalidad
- Llanalamata
- Estrada
- Nuestra Señora de Fátima
- La Pinga
- La Primayor
- La Provía
- el Quintu
- La Reguera
- La Sienra
- Sinariego
- El Tarancón
- La Tejera
- El Tercero
- La Torre
- Valdefarrucos
