= Olloniego =

Coordinates: 43°17′57″N 5°49′20″W

- Parish
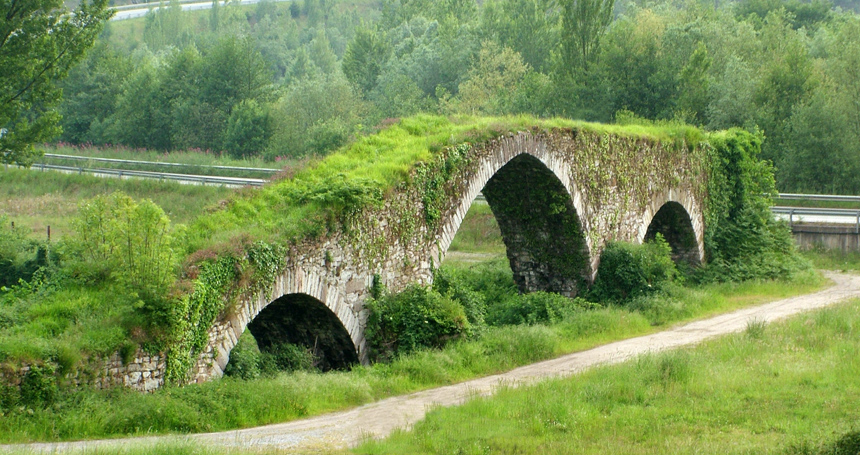
- Medieval bridge of Olloniego
- Interactive map of Olloniego
- Country: Spain
- Autonomous community: Asturias
- Comarca: Oviedo
- Municipality: Oviedo

Area
  - Total: 11.64 km^{2} (4.49 sq mi)

Population (2014)
  - Total: 1,039
  - Density: 89.26/km^{2} (231.2/sq mi)

Olloniego is a parish of the municipality of Oviedo, Asturias, Spain.

== History ==
In 1145, while reigning Alfonso VI of León and Castile, evidences were found pointing out that Olloniego was one of the main entrances to Oviedo. In the 16th century, the village was sold by Philip II of Spain to Rodrigo Bernaldo de Miranda.

In the 19th century, Olloniego was the mining zone of the municipality of Oviedo, but since the 1990s, the parish has been developing as an important industrial zone.
