= San Claudio =

Coordinates: 43°21′34″N 5°55′04″W

San Claudio is a town situated in the municipality of Oviedo, Spain. It lies 3.5 kilometres (2.2 miles) from Oviedo. It is named after Saint Claudius, a martyr of León, Spain.

The town center is called San Roque. Every spring, San Claudio hosts an annual outdoor festival in San Roque called Fiesta de Primavera (transl. Spring Festival) with music, theater and street parades.

A pottery factory operated in the town for generations. It was abandoned in the 1990s, and, in 2020, as part of the Parees Fest, Oviedo's Mural Intervention Festival, Spanish artist Manolo Mesa painted a mural featuring ceramics made at the factory.

The sewage treatment facility in San Claudio has buildings designed by Padilla Nicás Arquitectos with irregular profiles and features asymmetric pitched roofs to reduce the visual mass of the facility.
