= Lada, Asturias =

Lada (Langreo)
- Parish
- Location within Spain
- Country: Spain
- Autonomous community: Asturias
- Province: Asturias
- Municipality: Langreo

Area
  - Total: 10,468 km^{2} (4,042 sq mi)

Population (2025)
  - Total: 550

Lada is one of eight parishes in Langreo, a municipality within the province and autonomous community of Asturias, in northern Spain.

As of 2025, Lada had a total population of 550 inhabitants and a total area of 10,496 km^{2}. Located in Lada is Bayer's Planta de La Felguera which produces acetylsalicylic acid, the active ingredient in aspirin. Lada also has an important thermal power station. Until the Spanish industrial conversion, Lada hosted a lot of little factories.
