= Puerto de Vega =

Parish in Asturias, Spain

- Parish
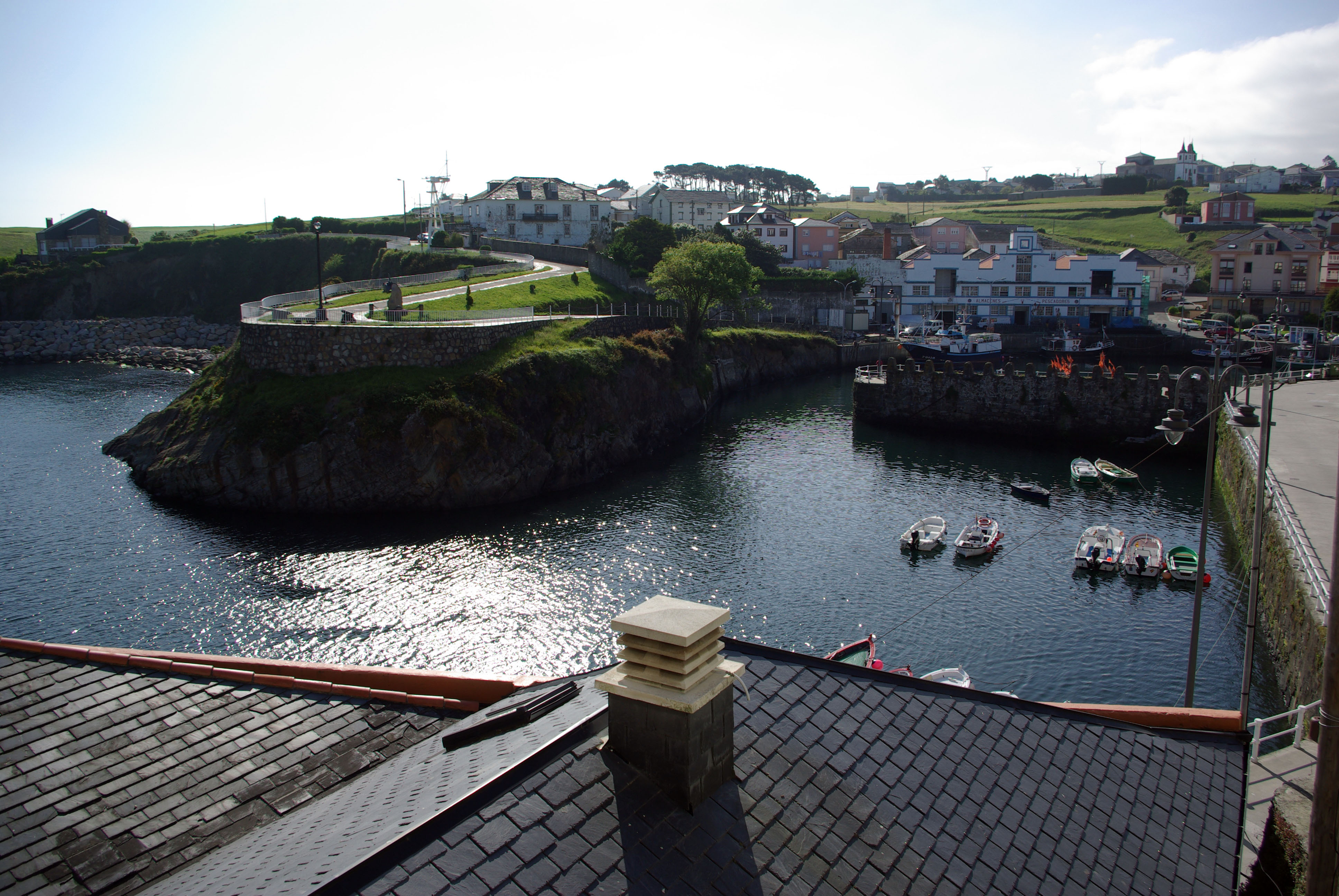
- The port of Puerto de Vega

- Location within Asturias Location within Spain
- Coordinates: 43.566667°N 6.633333°W
- Country: Spain
- Autonomous community: Asturias
- Province: Asturias
- Municipality: Navia

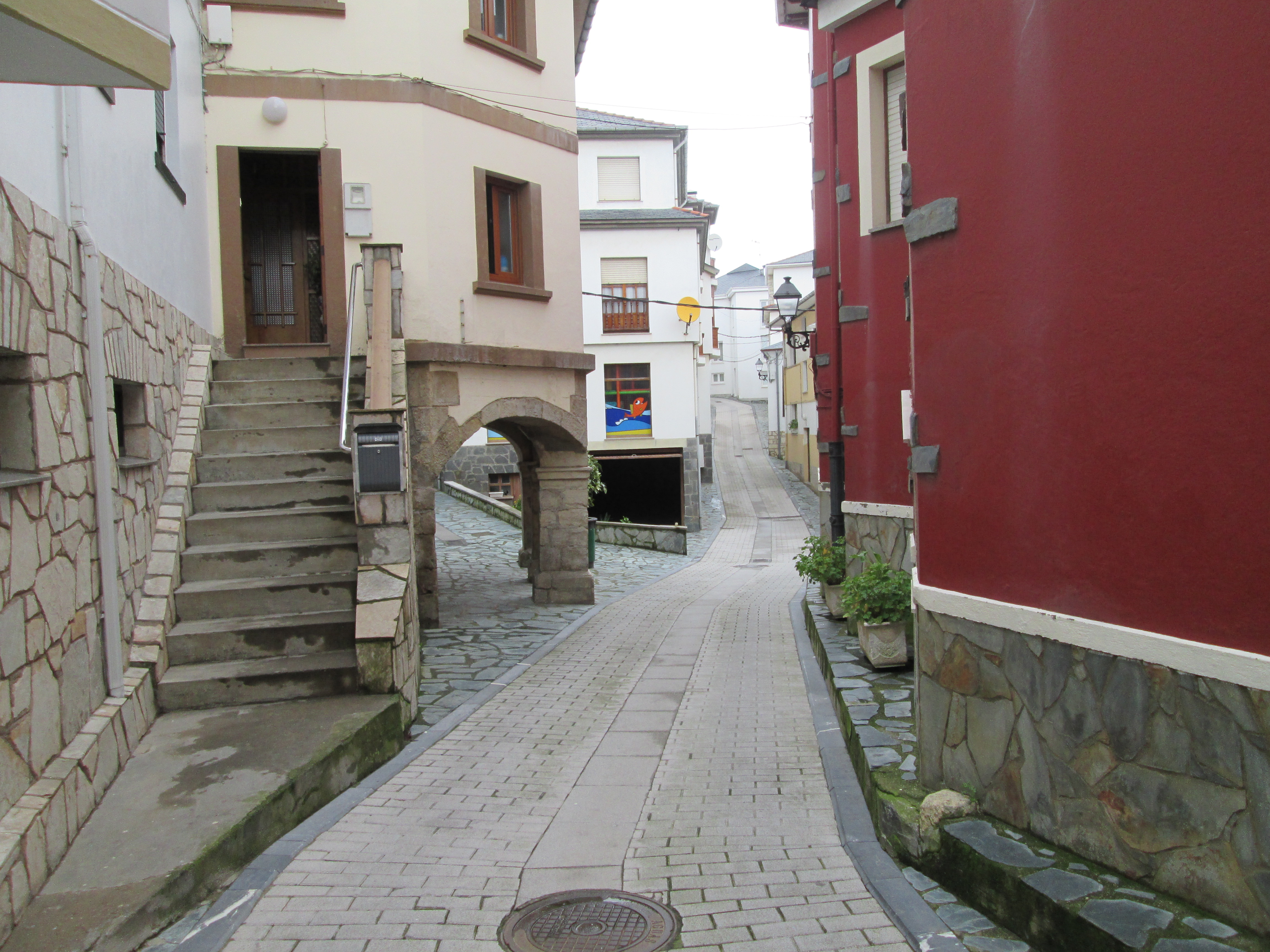
Streets in Puerto de Vega

Puerto de Vega is one of eight parishes (administrative divisions) in Navia, a municipality within the province and autonomous community of Asturias, in northern Spain.

In 1995, Puerto de Vega won the Prince of Asturias Award to the Exemplary Town of Asturias.

== Villages ==
- Puerto de Vega
- Santa Marina
- Soirana
- Vega
- Cima y Vigo

== Notable people ==
- Álvaro de Navia Osorio y Vigil, Marqués de Santa Cruz de Marcenado
- Gaspar Melchor de Jovellanos, statesman and poet (1744–1811), died here.
