= Aramil (Siero) =

Coordinates: 43.387791°N 5.611368°W

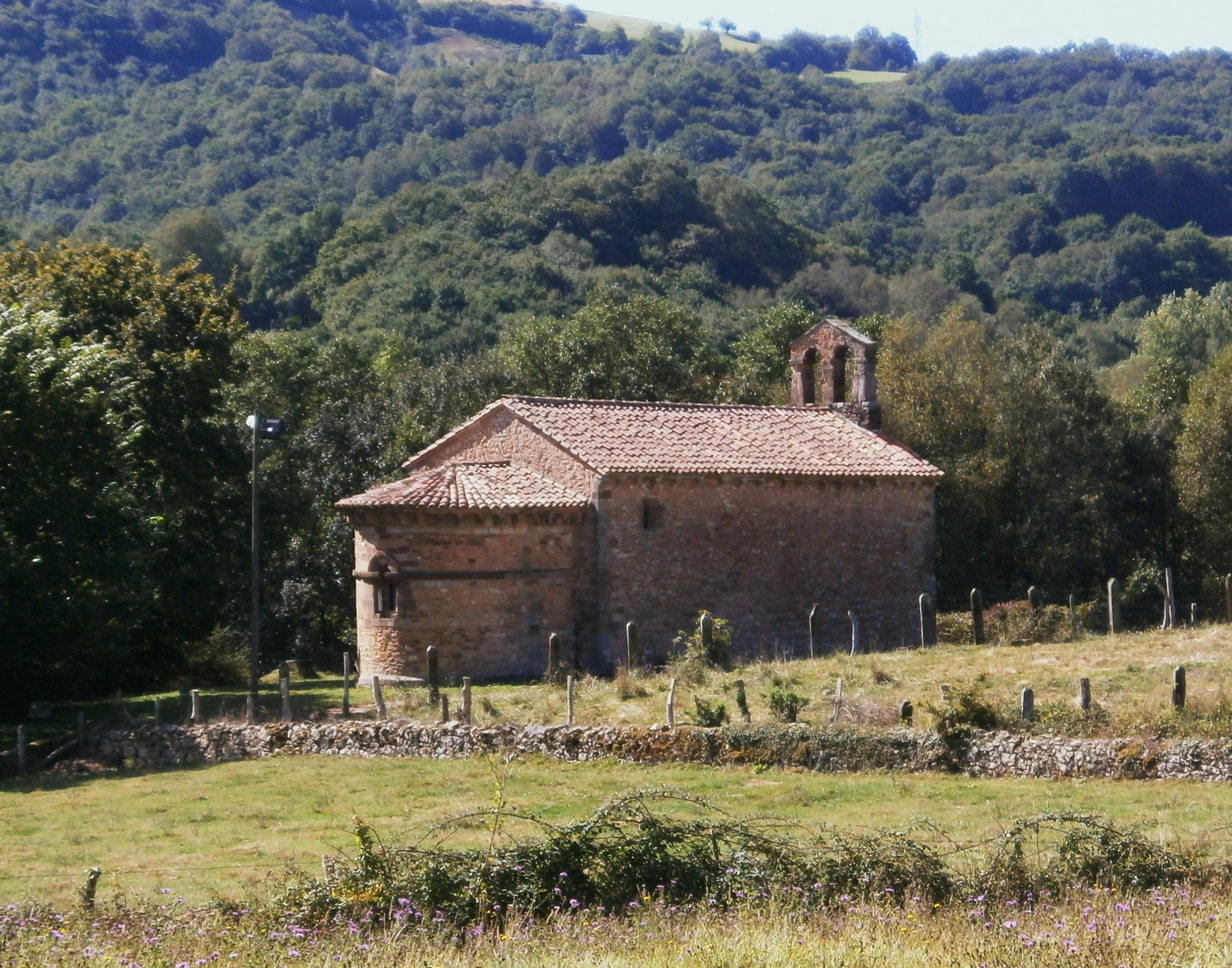
Church of San Esteban de Aramil

Aramil is a Spanish parroquia of Siero, in Asturias. It has a population of 347 inhabitants (INE 2011) in 173 homes. It occupies an area of 1.83 square kilometres (0.71 sq mi). It is located 5 km from the capital, La Pola Siero, in the eastern part of the council. It has a boundary on the northwest with the parish of Marcenao and Collao; to the east with Feleches; and to the south and southwest with Santolaya de Vixil. The Romanesque church of Church of San Esteban de Aramil is located in the town.

== Towns ==
As of 2011, it was populated by several towns:

- La Barreona
- El Castiellu
- Cuartes
- Pedraces
- La Quintana
- La Rebollá
- El Rincón
- San Roque
- Tabladiello
