= Vigil (disambiguation) =

A vigil is a period of purposeful sleeplessness or watchfulness.

Vigil may also refer to:

== Film, television and theatre ==
=== Film ===
- Vigil (film), a 1984 New Zealand film directed by Vincent Ward
- The Vigil (1914 film), an American short silent drama film
- The Vigil (1998 film), a Canadian comedy film
- The Vigil (2019 film), an American horror film

=== Television ===
- Vigil (TV series), a British police procedural television series
- "The Vigil" (Dynasty 1984), a television episode
- "The Vigil" (Dynasty 1986), a television episode
- The Vigil, fictional creatures from the Doctor Who episode "The Rings of Akhaten"

=== Theatre ===
- Vigil (musical), a 2017 Australian musical by Steve Vizard and Joe Chindamo
- The Vigil, a 1947 play by Ladislas Fodor

== Literature ==
- Jagari (English: The Vigil), a 1945 novel by Satinath Bhaduri
- Wraith (Image Comics), or Vigil, a comic book character
- Vigil (novel), a 2016 novel by Angela Slatter
- Vigil, a 2026 novel by George Saunders

== Music ==
- Vigil (band), a 1980s American rock band
- Vigil (album), by the Easybeats, 1968
- The Vigil (album), by Chick Corea, 2013
- "Vigil", a song by Fish from Vigil in a Wilderness of Mirrors, 1990
- "Vigil", a song by Lamb of God from As the Palaces Burn, 2003
- "The Vigil", a song by Blue Öyster Cult from Mirrors, 1979

== Video games ==
- Vigil: Blood Bitterness, a 2006 video game
- Vigil Games, a defunct American game developer

== Other uses ==
- Candlelight vigil, a method of remembrance, especially following a tragedy
- Vigil (horse) (foaled 1873), an American Thoroughbred racehorse
- Vigil (liturgy), a night prayer service in ancient Christianity
- Vigil (surname)
- Vigil Honor, a Boy Scouts of America Order of the Arrow honor
- Vigil, a village in the parish of Santa Eulalia de Vigil, Asturias, Spain
- The Vigil, an 1884 painting by John Pettie
- Vigil (space mission), a planned space weather mission by the European Space Agency.

== See also ==
- Vigiles, firefighters and nightwatchmen of Ancient Rome
