= Feleches =

Coordinates: 43.38333°N 5.58333°W

Feleches (variant: Thomas Feleches) is a parish (administrative division) in Siero, a municipality within the province and autonomous community of Asturias, in northern Spain.

It is situated at 254 m (833 ft) above sea level. The population is 797 (INE 2006). The postal code is 33119.

Feleches is divided in two by the national highway N-634. The parish is serviced by the FEVE rail transport system. It is located 7 km (4.3 mi) from the capitol, Pola de Siero. To the east, the River Nora, a tributary of the River Fal-Miravete, separates Feleches from the Lieres parish. Feleches is bounded on the north by Collado, on the south by Trespa, and to the west by Aramil.

== Culture ==
The Church of Santo Tomás, built in gothic architecture style, has domes, steeple bells, and two pinnacles on the front piece.

== Villages ==
The villages and hamlets include: Casa Abaxo, Casillu, Cigüeta, Los Corros, El Cotayu, El Camín, El Caminu, El Casillu, El Fontán, El Mure, El Pedreru, El Picu, El Rebollón, El Xelán, Felechín, Ferrería, Formanes, La Carretera, La Casona, La Casuca, La Cuesta, La Mata, La Matuca, La Panerona, La Quintana de Feleches, La Secada (La Secá), Moldano, Novalín, Nuste, Pedrero, Quintana de Arriba, Sanriella and Valdoria.
