= Valdesoto CF =

Valdesoto
- Full name: Valdesoto Club de Fútbol
- Founded: 1961
- Ground: Campo de Villarea, Valdesoto, Asturias, Spain
- Capacity: 1,000
- President: Herminio Rodríguez
- Manager: Juanma Castañón
- League: Primera Asturfútbol
- 2024–25: Primera Asturfútbol, 10th of 20
Home colours	Away colours

Valdesoto Club de Fútbol is a Spanish football club based in Valdesoto, Siero, in the autonomous community of Asturias.

== History ==
Founded in 1961, Valdesoto played most of their years in the first tier of the Asturian regional leagues. Its colors, red and blue, were chosen to avoid problems with the local fans of Sporting de Gijón and Real Oviedo, the two main teams in Asturias. In its second season, the club achieved the title of the old Copa Federación and its first promotion arrived in 1964.

In 1993, Valdesoto promoted for the first time to Tercera División thanks to the promotion of UP Langreo to Segunda División B.

After its relegation in 2002, Valdesoto played always in Regional Preferente until 2017, when it promoted again to Tercera, like in the first time, thanks to the promotion of an Asturian team to the third tier, this time Sporting de Gijón B.

Valdesoto only could remain in Tercera one season, but two years after their relegation, the club promoted again to Tercera División. It did it after the suspension of the league due to the COVID-19 pandemic.

== Season to season ==
Season	Tier	Division	Place	Copa del Rey
1961–62	5	2ª Reg.		
1962–63	5	2ª Reg.	6th	
1963–64	5	2ª Reg.	1st	
1964–65	4	1ª Reg.	7th	
1965–66	4	1ª Reg.	5th	
1966–67	4	1ª Reg.	5th	
1967–68	4	1ª Reg.	10th	
1968–69	4	1ª Reg.	10th	
1969–70	4	1ª Reg.	10th	
1970–71	4	1ª Reg.	13th	
1971–72	4	1ª Reg.	18th	
1972–73	4	1ª Reg.	16th	
1973–74	4	Reg. Pref.	18th	
1974–75	4	Reg. Pref.	11th	
1975–76	4	Reg. Pref.	14th	
1976–77	4	Reg. Pref.	20th	
1977–78	5	Reg. Pref.	11th	
1978–79	5	Reg. Pref.	18th	
1979–80	7	2ª Reg.	1st	
1980–81	6	1ª Reg.	12th	

Season	Tier	Division	Place	Copa del Rey
1981–82	6	1ª Reg.	8th	
1982–83	6	1ª Reg.	14th	
1983–84	6	1ª Reg.	18th	
1984–85	6	1ª Reg.	3rd	
1985–86	6	1ª Reg.	6th	
1986–87	5	Reg. Pref.	19th	
1987–88	5	Reg. Pref.	12th	
1988–89	5	Reg. Pref.	19th	
1989–90	6	1ª Reg.	2nd	
1990–91	5	Reg. Pref.	13th	
1991–92	5	Reg. Pref.	8th	
1992–93	5	Reg. Pref.	4th	
1993–94	4	3ª	20th	
1994–95	5	Reg. Pref.	3rd	
1995–96	4	3ª	19th	
1996–97	5	Reg. Pref.	11th	
1997–98	5	Reg. Pref.	11th	
1998–99	5	Reg. Pref.	6th	
1999–2000	5	Reg. Pref.	3rd	
2000–01	4	3ª	14th	

Season	Tier	Division	Place	Copa del Rey
2001–02	4	3ª	19th	
2002–03	5	Reg. Pref.	6th	
2003–04	5	Reg. Pref.	13th	
2004–05	5	Reg. Pref.	14th	
2005–06	5	Reg. Pref.	8th	
2006–07	5	Reg. Pref.	6th	
2007–08	5	Reg. Pref.	6th	
2008–09	5	Reg. Pref.	17th	
2009–10	5	Reg. Pref.	5th	
2010–11	5	Reg. Pref.	7th	
2011–12	5	Reg. Pref.	11th	
2012–13	5	Reg. Pref.	7th	
2013–14	5	Reg. Pref.	8th	
2014–15	5	Reg. Pref.	7th	
2015–16	5	Reg. Pref.	9th	
2016–17	5	Reg. Pref.	4th	
2017–18	4	3ª	18th	
2018–19	5	Reg. Pref.	12th	
2019–20	5	Reg. Pref.	3rd	
2020–21	4	3ª	10th / 9th	

Season	Tier	Division	Place	Copa del Rey
2021–22	6	Reg. Pref.	1st	
2022–23	5	3ª Fed.	16th	
2023–24	6	1ª Astur.	13th	
2024–25	6	1ª Astur.	10th	
2025–26	6	1ª Astur.		

- 6 seasons in Tercera División
- 1 season in Tercera Federación
