= Lugones, Siero =

Lugones Llugones (Asturian)
- Parish
- Lugones/Llugones
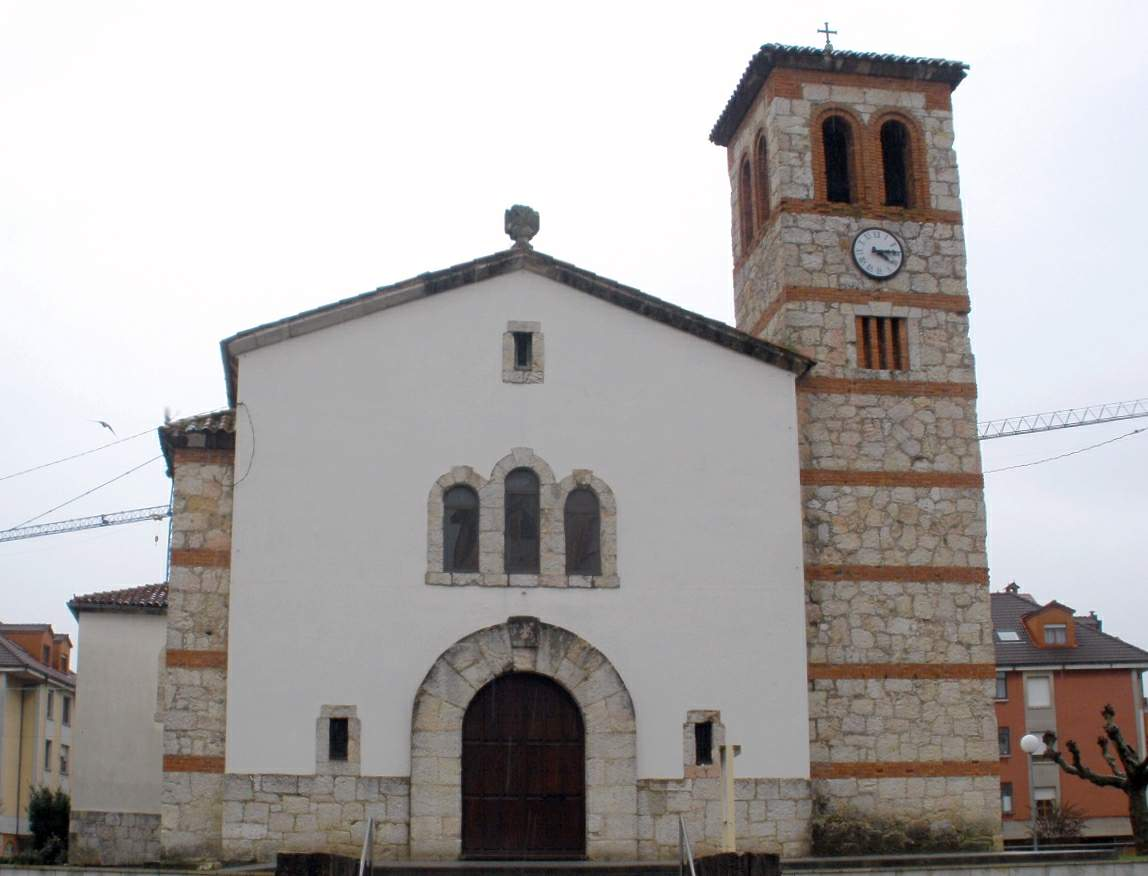
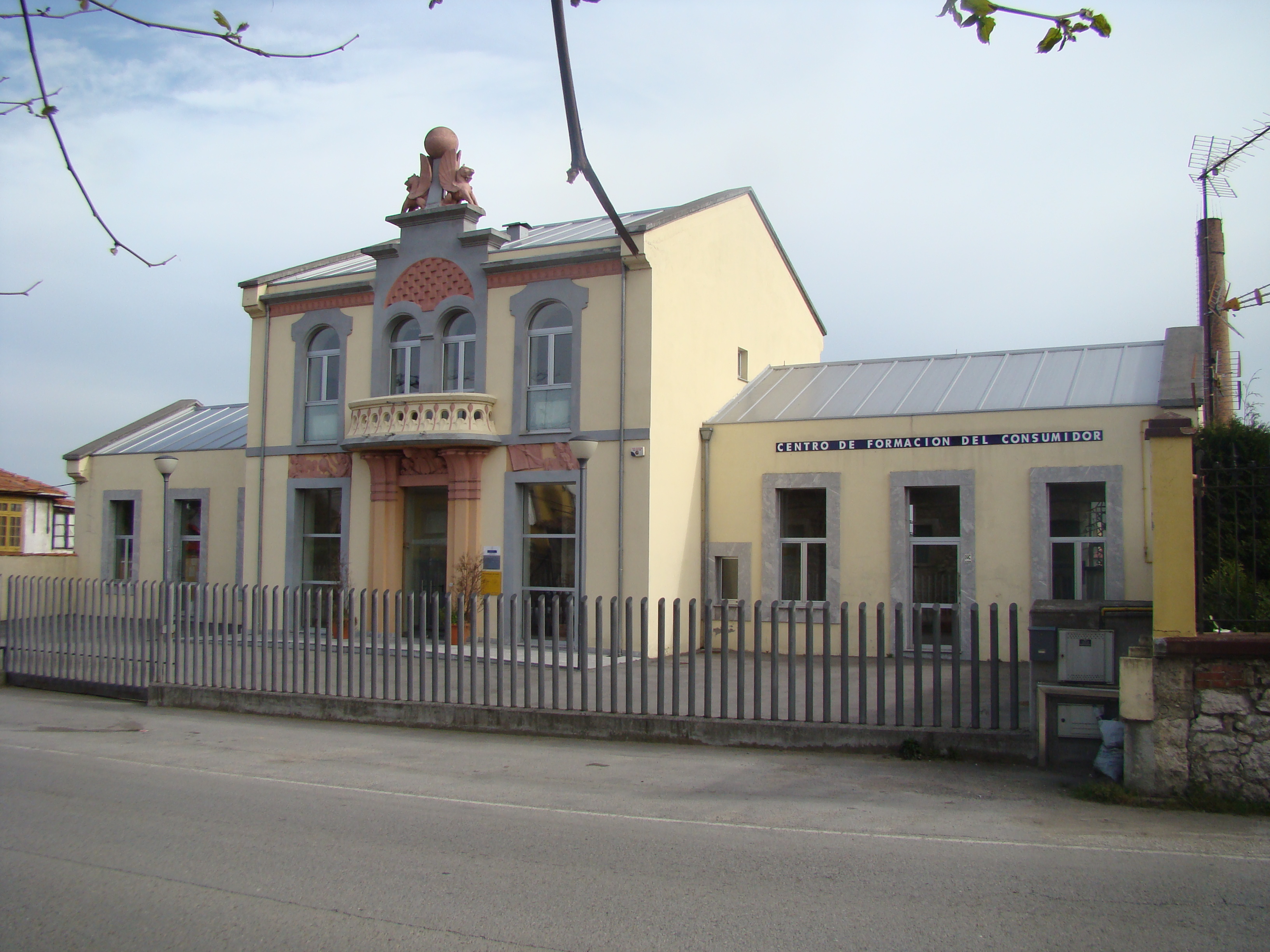
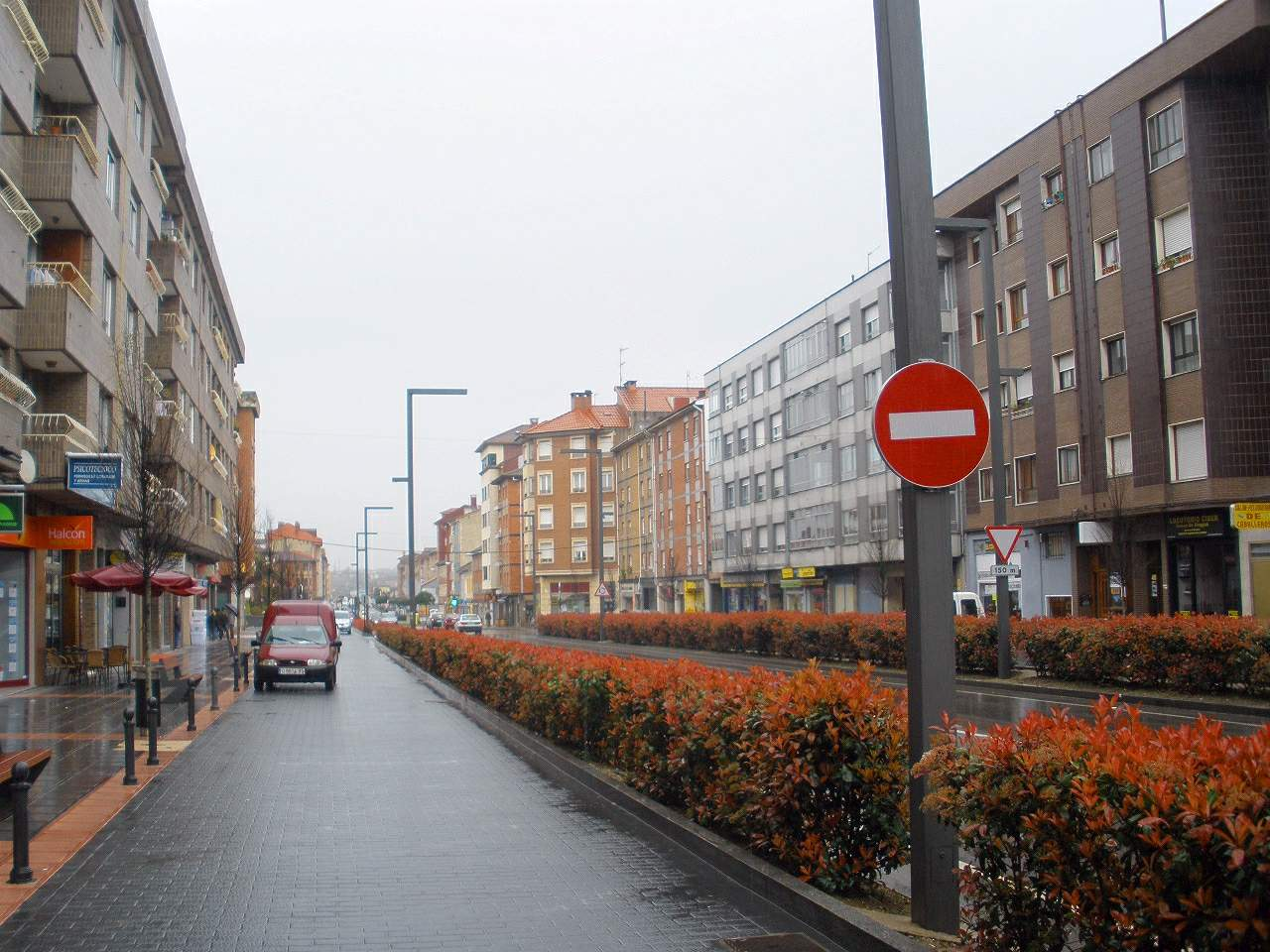
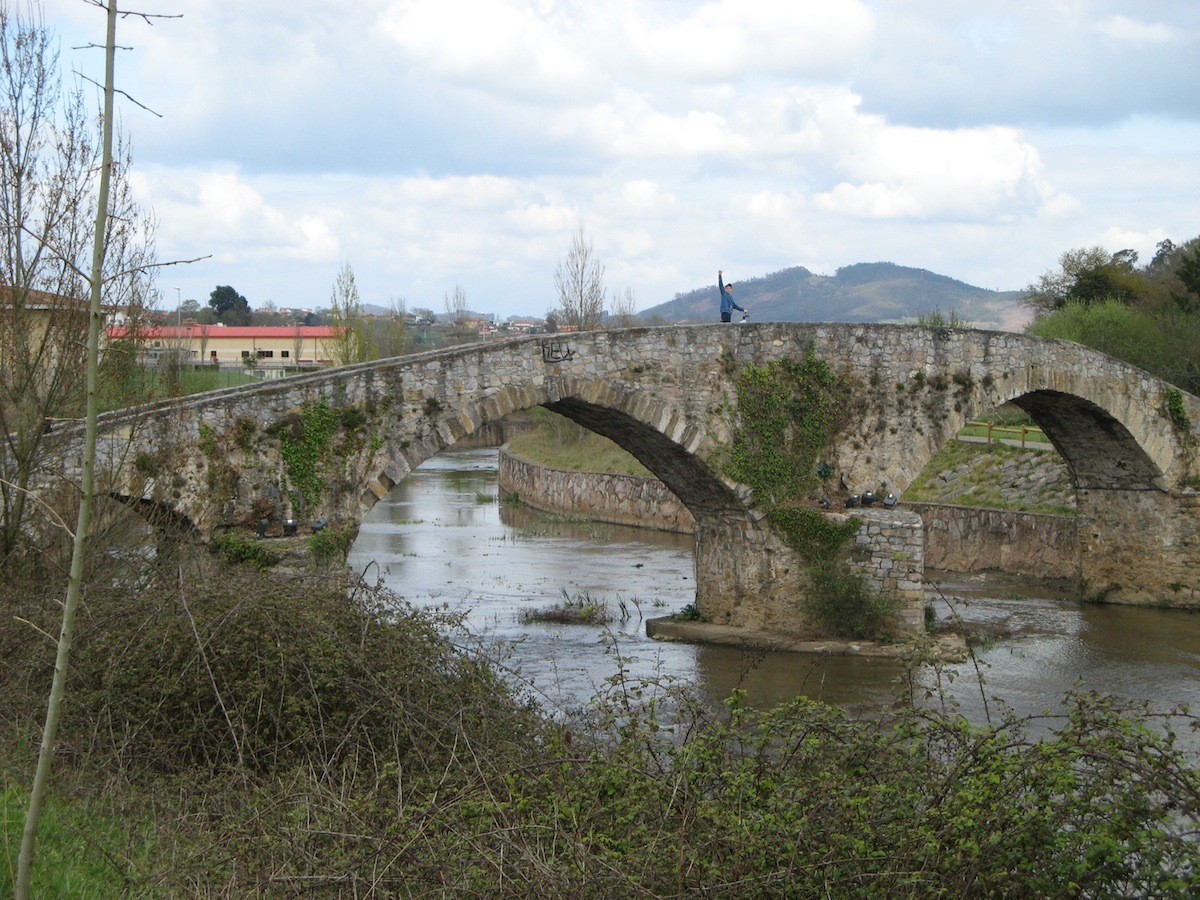
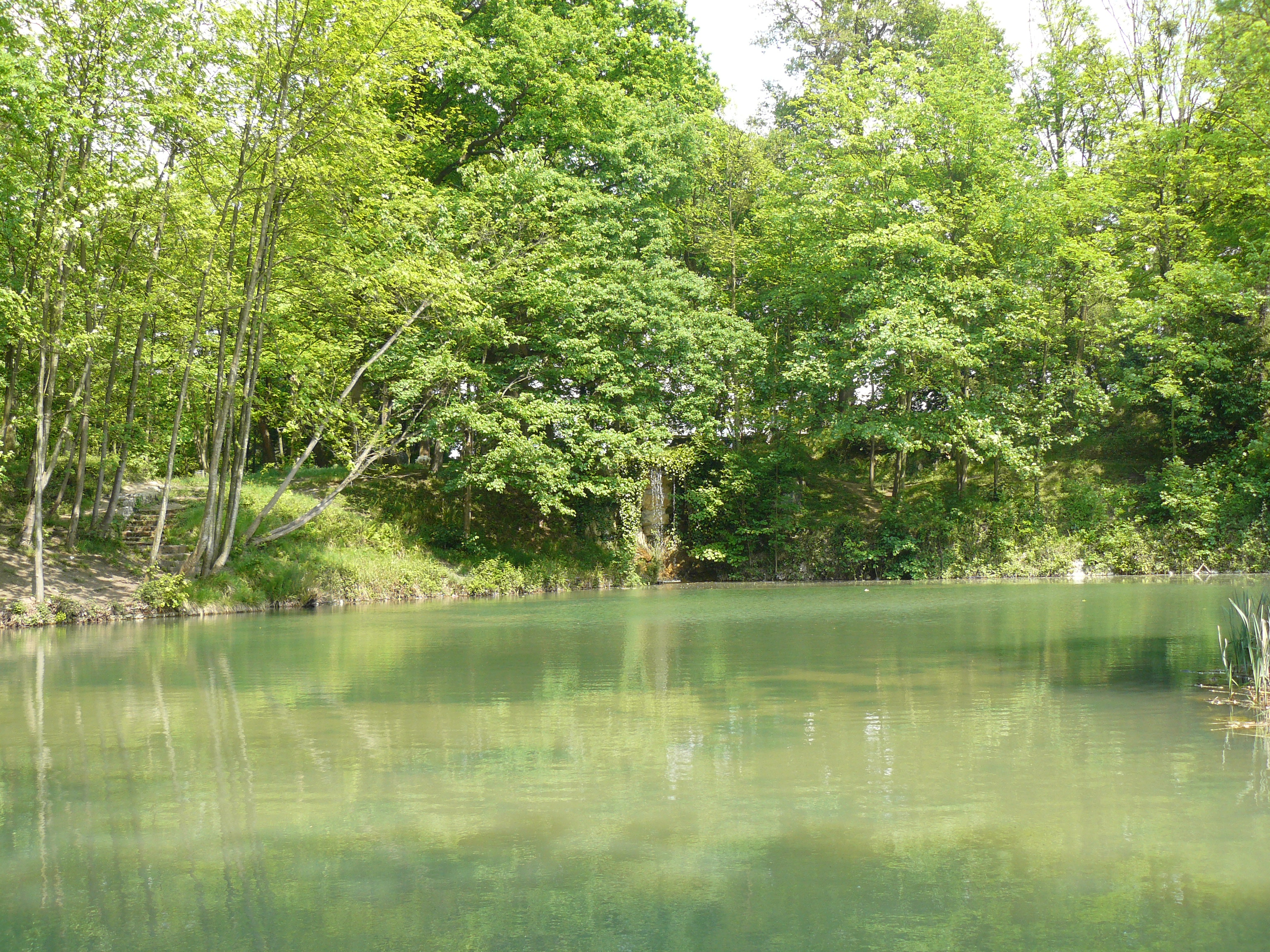
- From top: Church of San Felix, the 'Old Schools' building, Oviedo Avenue, the 'Old' (Vieyu) Bridge, L'Acebera park,

- Flag Coat of arms

- Location within Spain Location within Asturias
- Coordinates: 43.4°N 5.8°W
- Country: Spain
- Autonomous community: Asturias
- Province: Asturias
- Municipality: Siero

Area
  - Total: 5.48 km^{2} (2.12 sq mi)
- Elevation: 170 m (560 ft)

Population (2019)
  - Total: 13,191
  - Density: 2,410/km^{2} (6,230/sq mi)
- Demonym(s): lugonino, -a or lugonense (es) llugoninu, -a, -o or llugonense (ast)
- Postal code: 33420

Lugones (in Asturian language, Llugones) is a parish in Siero, a municipality within the province and autonomous community of Asturias, in northern Spain.

It is 5.48 km^{2} (2.12 sq mi) in size, with a population of 11,646 (INE 2006). It is situated at 159 m (522 ft) above sea level. The postal code is 33420.

Lugones has existed since before the time of the Roman Empire, named after the Luggoni tribe, itself named after the Celtic God Lug.

== History ==
=== Prehistory and early history ===
The place name of Lugones has an indigenous Celtic root Luggoni, a tribe that was predominant in the center of current day Asturias, along with other tribes. Luggoni comes from the Celtic root lug that meant "bright". Lug was also a solar divinity, the main deity of the Celts in the peninsula, of whom the Luggoni were thought to be the descendants of, meaning that they were the 'children of light'. According to ancient literary documentation, the current territory of the municipality of Siero, were Lugones is located, was inhabited by the Luggoni tribe belonging to the Astures, with clear Celtic roots. In the year 572, the king of the Suebi, Miro, carried out an incursion against the Luggoni.

In the vicinity of Lugones town center there are sites such as a castro called "Castro La Torre" which was located in Paredes, on a terrace over the Nora River. Archeologist Jose Manuel González, in 1957 locates the site of a Roman villa in the neighbourhood of Les Folgueres, in a hamlet called "Monte Les Muries" in the village of Paredes, near a path that goes from this village to Colloto (Oviedo), and to the right of the Nora river. Several ceramic remains were found on the site. The place names of the localities were those remains were found, such as Murias and Paredes, are significant.

In 1997, during the construction of a shopping center in the locality of Paredes, a necropolis was found. It is believed that it was linked to the Roman villa located by Jose Manuel González in 1957. After construction, the archaeological remains of the necropolis were left in the middle of the parking area. Later it was fenced and cleaned to allow visits, with the placement of information panels, while most of the objects found can be seen in the Archaeological Museum of Asturias (Oviedo).

Remains of the Old Bridge (Puente Vieyu, in Asturian) remain from Roman times, later renovated. It communicated Oviedo with this area and was part of a Roman road that linked the towns of "Astúrica Augusta" (Astorga) and "Lucus Asturum" (Lugo de Llanera).

=== Modern history ===
In 1882 the gunpowder factory of the Santa Bárbara Society, founded by José Tartiere (es) began its activities in Lugones, constituted two years before by a group of important capitalists outside the municipality. Lugones is chosen given the excellent communications of the place, with crossroads of the roads that lead from Oviedo to Avilés and Gijón.

The opening of the railway line from León to Gijón in 1884 (which crosses Lugones) and the line of the Economic Railways from Oviedo to Infiesto in November 1891 precedes the industrial development that will take place in some areas of the council between 1895 and 1901. In 1896, the Lugones metal factory, owned by the Santa Bárbara Asturian Society, opened its doors.

As a result of all the developments that José Tartiere's companies did in Asturias, and particularly in Lugones, in 1922, King Alfonso XIII grant him the title of Count of Saint Barbara of Lugones.

At the beginning of the 20th century, the installation of new industries and the development of new companies in Lugones meant that its population tripled, as it grew to become a dormitory town for Oviedo.

== Geography ==
=== Location ===
Lugones is located in the central area of Asturias. The area of the parish is 5.48 km^{2} (2.12 sq mi). It limits to the south with the municipality of Oviedo, with river Nora acting as the natural border between Siero (the municipality of Lugones) and Oviedo's neighbourhood La Corredoria. To the north it limits with the municipality of Llanera and Siero's parish Viella (which includes the town of La Fresneda). To the east it limits Siero's parishes of Viella and Granda and to the west it limits with Villaperi and Naranco, both parishes in Oviedo.

=== Villages ===
The villages and hamlets include: El Carbayu, El Castro, El Cuetu, La Ería, Folgueras, Lugones, Los Molinos, Paredes, Los Peñones, Puente Vieyu, El Resbalón, San José, El Sucu, La Torre and El Villar.

== Demographics ==
Historical population
Year	Pop.	±%
2001	11,543	—
2002	11,570	+0.2%
2003	11,588	+0.2%
2004	11,528	−0.5%
2005	11,495	−0.3%
2006	11,646	+1.3%
2007	11,765	+1.0%
2008	12,224	+3.9%
2009	12,602	+3.1%
2010	12,727	+1.0%
2011	12,860	+1.0%
2012	12,967	+0.8%
2013	13,054	+0.7%
2014	13,107	+0.4%
2015	13,109	+0.0%
2016	13,109	+0.0%
2017	13,052	−0.4%
2018	13,088	+0.3%
2019	13,191	+0.8%
2020	13,139	−0.4%
2021	13,135	−0.0%
Source: Instituto Nacional de Estadística

Lugones's population has seen an explosion since the beginnings of the 20th century. As of 2021, 13,135 people lived in the parish, with more than 99% doing it in the main town of Lugones (13,047). In the rural locality of Paredes the total population was of 79 residents, while only 7 people lived in Les Folgueres.

As of 2018, 611 foreign lived in the parish, which represents 40% of the total foreign population in Siero. Foreign population represents around 4% of the population of Lugones. By nationalities, in Lugones live 110 Chinese, 73 Colombians, 71 Moroccan, 66 Portuguese, 61 Romanians, 49 Brazilians, 19 Paraguayans, 18 Venezuelans and 19 Ukrainians.

== Cityscape ==
=== Parks and forests ===
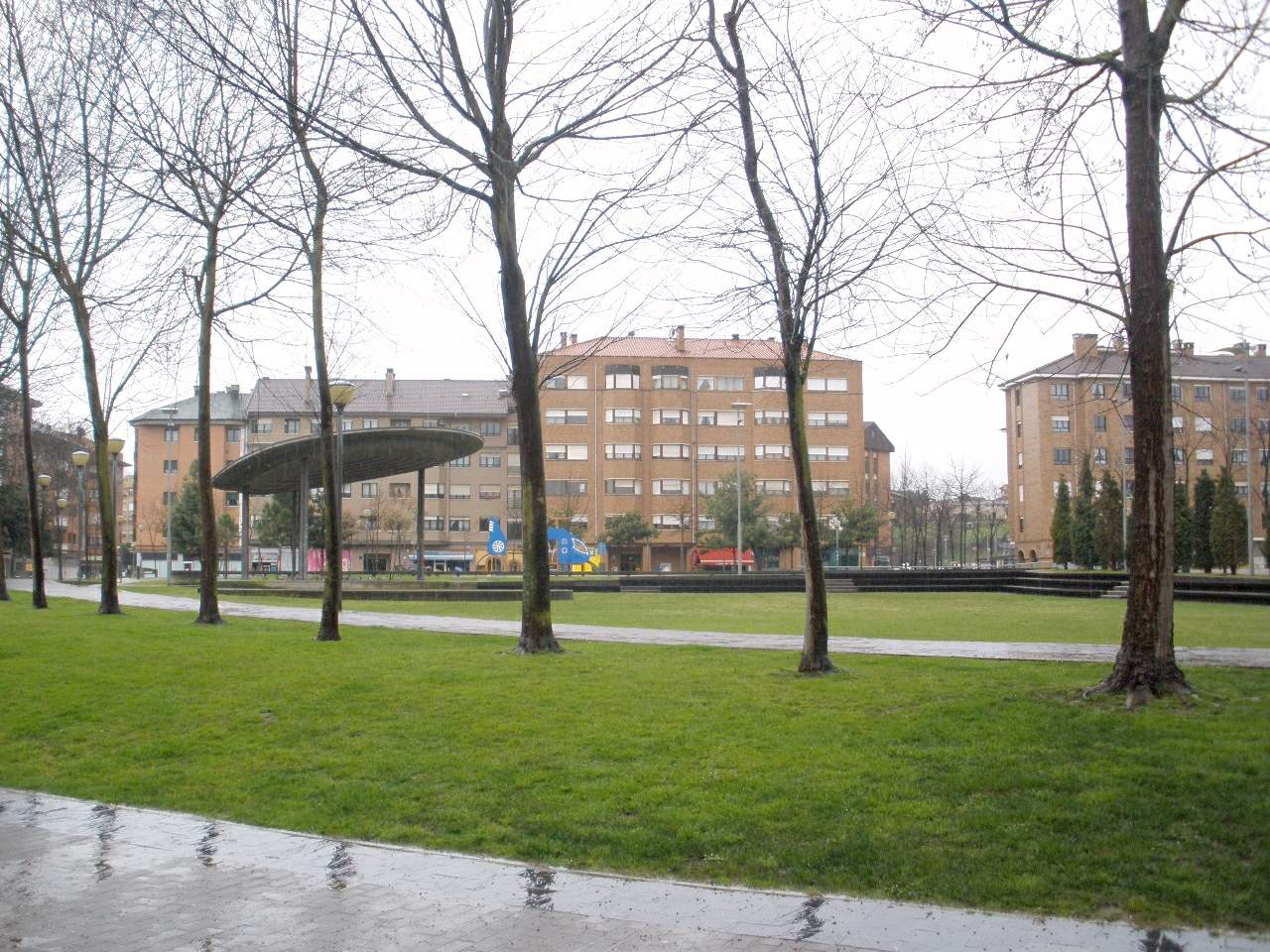
Photograph of the main park in Lugones, with the bandstand in the background.

In Lugones, the most notable parks and forests that could be found in the town and surroundings are the following:

- Parque de la Paz (literally Peace park), popularly known as Parque de la Manzana Central (lit. Central Square park), is a park in Lugones' town centre. It has multiple equipments, which include a bandstand, a kids' area and a small cycling circuit.
- L'Acebera park, located in the outskirts of the town, it was owned until 1982 by the Santa Barbara Society. The company, owned by the Count of Saint Bárbara, used this area for testing the explosives produced in the factories in the town. The park was also used for storage of those explosives, as well as other buildings related to the factory, whose remains can be seen today. The city council bought the area in 1982, but it wasn't until 2001 when a plan was put in place to transform the forest into a proper park. Currently, the park has a lake and a cascade, various picnic areas and a playground.

== Art and culture ==
=== Museums and cultural centres ===
The main cultural centre in Lugones is the Centro Polivalente Integrado ("Integrated Multipurpose Center") (CPI), opened in 2020 and that substitutes the older Casa de la Cultura ("House of Culture"). The latter was opened in 1972 in the town centre and was later demolished and re-built in 2000 as a result of the growth of population in the parish. The Centro includes an auditorium that can hold 540 spectators and a conference room for 107. There is also a library as well as various municipal offices.

=== Feast and festivals ===
It has two patron saint festivities: that of Nuestra Señora del Buen Suceso, also known as El Carbayu for the neighborhood where it is located, it is celebrated the first weekend of August. In the last week of the same month, Santa Isabel is celebrated, when La Ruta de Lugones is celebrated, which has a large attendance of young people, consisting of a 'rute' across the town's bars and pubs. They also celebrate Saint John's bonfires.

In the month of April, the Folkloric Association La Sidrina presents the "Pueblo de Lugones" Award, as well as an Exhibition dedicated each year to themes of Asturian Culture. On the last Saturday of August, coinciding with the Fiestas de Santa Isabel, they organize the International Folkloric Exhibition of Lugones. The Lugones Se Mueve Cultural Association organizes a Popular Cider Test in April and a Beer Festival in June.

== Sport ==
=== Facilities ===
Lugones has an artificial turf soccer field, which hosts the matches of Atlético de Lugones SD and Beredi CF; an Asturian-style bowling alley, which has hosted important competitions, including international ones; outdoor swimming pools at L'Acebera; and a municipal sports complex with a sports court, gym, sauna and heated pool.

== Economy ==
Surrounded by industrial estates and about 5 kilometers from Oviedo, its location in the center of Asturias allows it to absorb a large number of passers-by both in the leisure area and in commerce. Lugones has a large number of hospitality businesses, mainly cider houses and restaurants, many of them around the section of Leopoldo Lugones street called "La Peatonal", an icon of the local hospitality industry, and a growing tourist attraction that also generates significant profits for Lugones directly and for Siero indirectly through taxes. However, the expansion of Lugones accelerated especially from the 1970s as a dormitory town. Surrounding the town are two of the busiest shopping centers in Asturias, Parque Principado and the Azabache shopping centre.
