= Tinana (disambiguation) =

Tinana is a waka used by early Māori migrators.

Tinana may also refer to:

- Tiñana, a parish in Siero, Asturias, Spain
- Tinana, Queensland
- Shire of Tinana, a former local government area in Queensland, Australia
