= Samartino =

Coordinates: 43°23′58″N 5°38′21″W

Samartino (Spanish: Vega de Poja) is a parish (administrative division) in Siero, a municipality within the province and autonomous community of Asturias, in northern Spain. The parish is located to the Northeast of the administrative capital of the municipality, Pola de Siero, between Highway AS-331 and Highway AS-248.

According to the Instituto Nacional de Estadística (Spain), In 2023, Samartino had a population of 1023.

== Origin and history ==
The first documented reference to the parish church of Saint Martin appears in the Middle Ages, in approximately 905, during the reign of Alfonso III.
