= Iglesia de San Pedro (Pola de Siero) =

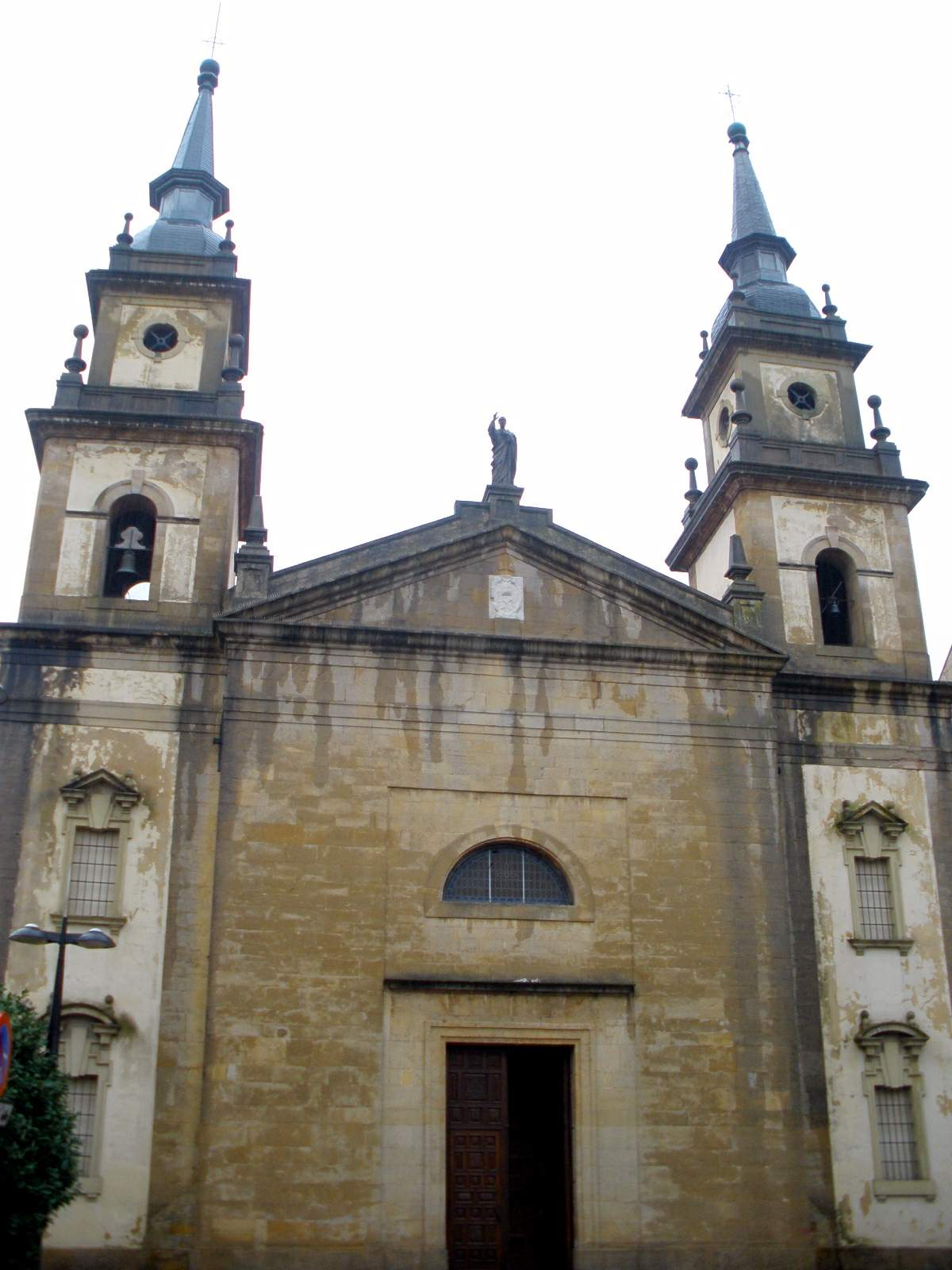
- Church of St Peter
- Iglesia de San Pedro (Pola de Siero)
- Location: Pola de Siero, Siero, Asturias, Spain

Iglesia de San Pedro (Pola de Siero) is a 19th-century, Neoclassical-style, Roman Catholic church in Pola de Siero, Siero, Asturias, Spain.

== See also ==
- Asturian art
- Catholic Church in Spain
