= Trespando =

Coordinates: 43.366667°N 5.6°W

Trespando is a parish (administrative division) in Siero, a municipality within the province and autonomous community of Asturias, in northern Spain. It is 4 km (2.5 mi) from the municipality's capital Pola de Siero and is in the heart of the Asturian mining region.

Situated at 230 m (750 ft) above sea level, it is 4.10 km^{2} (1.58 sq mi) in size, with a population of 250 (INE 2006). The postal code is 33518.
