= Florina Alías =

Spanish writer (born 1921)

Florina Alías (Colloto, 1921 - Gijón, Asturias, 1999) was a Spanish author, a member of the Xeneración de la posguerra.

== Biography ==
A bilingual writer in Spanish and Asturian, she began publishing in the 1950s in regional newspapers. She married the writer, Luis Aurelio Álvarez. Together, they wrote and published, Xente de casa: Cien asturianos de hoy (1974). In her texts, Alías presents an idealized but alive Asturias, narrating in a clear, clean and natural language. She won many prizes in Asturian language and Spanish language including the "I Andecha de los Amigos del Bable", the "II Concursu de Cuentos del Centru Asturianu de Madrid" (1980) with the story, Señaldaes del Sueve, as well as the first prize on seafaring poetry convened by the Spanish Naval League.

== Works ==
- "Xente de casa : Cien asturianos de hoy" / Luis Aurelio Alvarez y Florina Alías; prólogo, Emilio Alarcos Llorach; epílogo, Francisco Aguilar y Paz. . — Oviedo : [s.n.], 1974 (Ensidesa).
- "Señaldaes del Sueve" / de Florina Alias Rodríguez.... – [S.l.] : ALSA, D.L. 1980. – 41 p.; 17 cm
- A la sombra del carbayón: (Guía poética de Oviedo) / Florina Alías; dibujos de Gaspar Meana]. — Gijón : Libros de la Luna Llena, 1995.
- "Gijón y el mar en el recuerdo" / Florina Alías; prólogo de Francisco Carantoña; epílogo de Pedro de Silva Cienfuegos-Jovellanos. — Gijón : [L'autora], 1997.
- Antón García, “Florina Alías”, en Lliteratura asturiana nel tiempu, Uviéu, Conseyería d’Educación, Cultura, Deportes y Xuventú, 1994,
