= Colloto =

Colloto / Cualloto
- Location in Asturias
- Coordinates: 43.377°N 5.798°W
- Country: Spain
- Autonomous community: Principado de Asturias
- Province: Asturias
- Municipality: Oviedo and Siero
- Highest elevation: 175 m (574 ft)
- Lowest elevation: 170 m (560 ft)

Population (2008)
  - Total: 3.076
- Time zone: UTC+1 (CET)
  - Summer (DST): UTC+2 (CEST)
- Postal code: 33010

Colloto (Asturian: Cualloto, and officially Colloto/Cualloto) is a place in the municipalities of Oviedo and Siero, Asturias, Spain. It is 5 kilometres (3.1 mi) from the city of Oviedo.

== Notable people ==
- Florina Alías (1921-1999), author
