= Samartindianes =

Coordinates: 43.416667°N 5.7°W

Samartindianes (Spanish: Anes, officially: Anes/Samartindianes) is a parish (administrative division) in Siero, a municipality within the province and autonomous community of Asturias, in northern Spain.

It is 27.55 km^{2} (10.64 sq mi) in size, with a population of 1,135 (INE 2006). The postal code is 33189.

== Villages and hamlets ==
- Arniella
- Les casadianes
- El Cuto
- Espiniella
- Fombona
- Grandarrasa
- Güergo
- La Barganiza
- La Calabaza
- La Carizal
- La Figarona
- La Madera
- Les Cabañes
- Llameo
- Llanaces
- Llanteru
- Pañeda Nueva
- Pañeda Vieya
- Palmiano
- Picalloréu
- Poladura
- San Pedro
- San Tiso
- Varé
- Vio
- El Yérbanu
