= Samiguel =

Coordinates: 43°23′31″N 5°44′37″W

Samiguel is a parish (administrative division) in Siero, a municipality within the province and autonomous community of Asturias, in northern Spain. It is located along the AS-17 road.

The population is 237 (INE).

Parish celebrations are held the first week of September.
