= Lieres =

- Parish
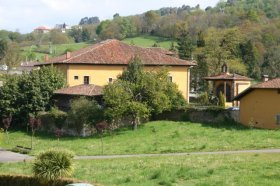
- Palacio de Lieres, 2006

- Location within Spain
- Coordinates: 43.3833°N 5.5667°W
- Country: Spain
- Autonomous community: Asturias
- Province: Asturias
- Municipality: Siero

Area
  - Total: 8.1 km^{2} (3.1 sq mi)

Population (2006)
  - Total: 1,542

Lieres (or Santa Maria Lieres) is a parish in Siero, a municipality within the province and autonomous community of Asturias, in northern Spain. It encompasses 8.1 km^{2} (3.1 sq mi) and is situated at an altitude of 242 m (794 ft) above sea level. The population, as of 2006, was 1,542. The postal code is 33580.

Its territory includes the Nora River, a tributary of the River Fal-Miravete.

Located along the National Highway N-634, Lieres is 8 km (5.0 mi) from the capital of Siero, Pola de Siero, and 5 km (3.1 mi) from the town of Nava, Asturias.

The villages within the Lieres parish are split by the N-634 highway. Les Faces, La Pedrera, Solvay, La Fresneda, El Cuitu, El Rebollar, La Cruz, El Acebal (L'Acebal, Espinera), La Cigüeta, El Monte, Los Barracks, The Slash, Campiello (Campiellu, Cotaya), El Pino, La Cabaña, and Faya are on one side, while Quintanal d'Arriba, Quintanal d'Abaxu, The Court, The Ventuca The Moldano, Sacadiella, Sorrobín, La Cuesta, El Recuncu, Piñuli, and Curuxeu the Cubiella are on the other.

The Lieres to Novalín rail line was formally opened November 13, 1891. With the later closure of mines, Lieres' small line rail, linking its mine with Reano, fell into disuse. The railroad was renovated in more recent years.

== Origin and history ==
Lieres was first documented in history in 1385 in the Book Becerro of the Cathedral of San Salvador in Oviedo. The bishop ordered a census of all properties, jurisdiction of mitra, church constitutions, etc. as well as a state in which they appear. Diocesano inventoried all the churches in their area. The church of Santa Maria de El Moldano in Lieres was included. In 1771, it was changed to St. Maria Lieres.

Lieres re-emerged in the 16th century in the book of healing at Oviedo's Cathedral.

By the 19th century, Spain, including Lieres and Asturias suffered through two wars. This included the loss of Spanish colonies in the Americas, and the Spanish War of Independence, the war that led to the French invasion in May 1808. Early on, the residents of Siero participated in the conflict brought on by the Spanish War of Independence. In December 1808, the Siero Regiment was established, including 27 officers and 585 soldiers. In the days beginning on March 19, 1809, Marshal Michel Ney and his army seized La Pola. The French army plundered the area, causing serious damage, several deaths, and desolation among the people. In 1810, there was a new invasion of the principality, its mission to seize the capital. It lasted one year and included a battle at the bridge Colloto. There were many acts of vandalism by the French army troops. This instigated guerrilla resistance groups, the most notable being "The Nietu" of La Pola, the "Fombellida" in Valdesoto, and the "Jerome" (or "The Xastre").

In May 1812, during the Battle of Salamanca, General Bonet, deputy commander under Marshal Auguste de Marmont, suffered significant casualties with the systematic aggression of the guerrillas of Asturias, which lead Bonet to abandon the region and continue the fight on other fronts. Municipal documents created in 1813 did not record any casualties in Lieres as, if casualties had been documented, the widows would have to have been compensated with lifelong pensions.

== Industry ==
During the 18th century, coal mining transformed Lieres. The British "Society of St. Louis" moved to Lieres after its economic collapse in the Carbayín parish. Lieres had the best mines of Asturias and the best prices.

Though Lieres' main industry for most of the 20th century was mining, the alcohol industry continued as well. As a result of the Cuban War of Independence, Spain needed other sources of sugar. On July 12, 1898, the "Sugar Lieres" company began operations to produce sugar, manufacturing it from beets, and then distilling alcohol.

== Culture ==
The monument Palacio de Cavanilles Centi is located in the parish. Notable festivals include: Our Lady of Health (first Sunday in August), Cristo del Agua (first Sunday in September), and San Antonio.
