= Nora (Spain) =

River in Spain

Coordinates: 43.41879°N 5.89186°W

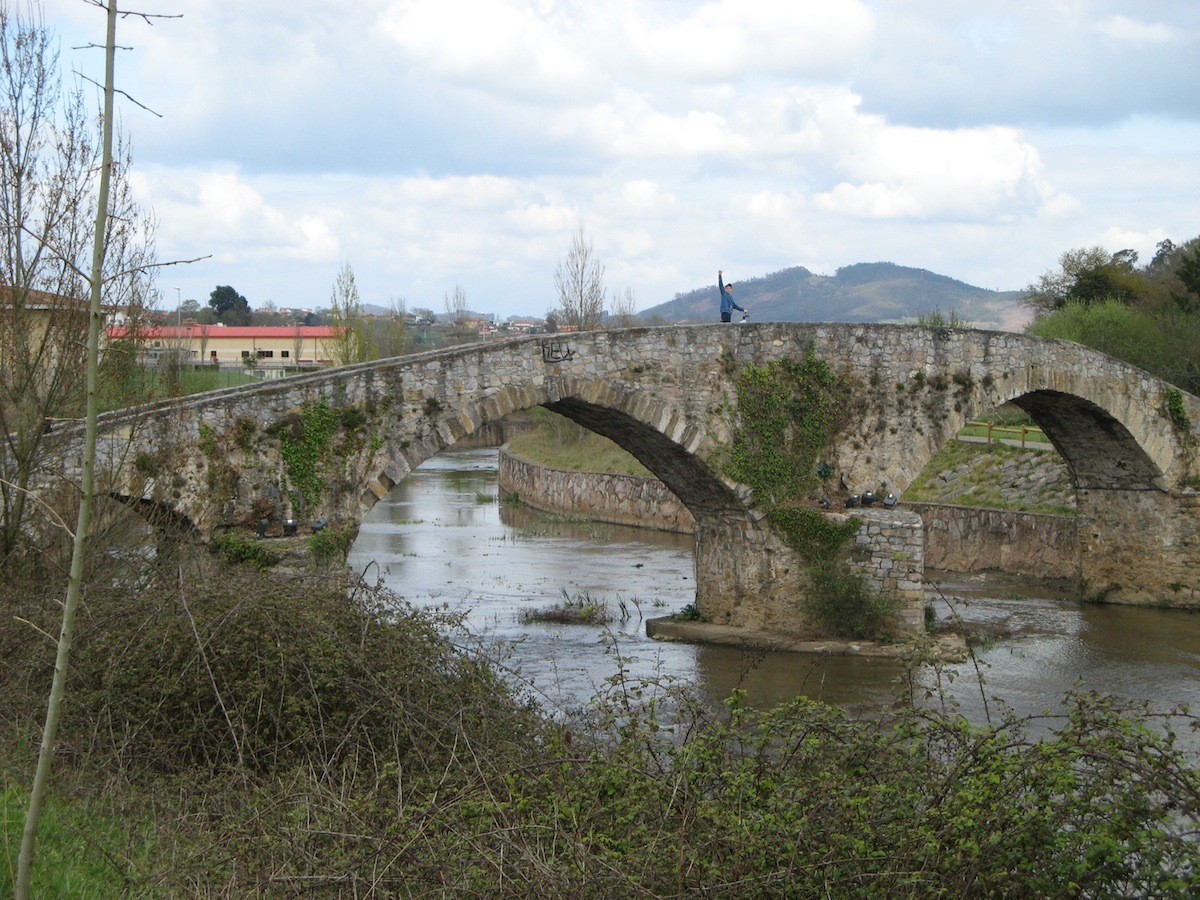
Roman bridge over the Nora River

The Nora River is a waterway in the north of Spain, a tributary of the Nalón River that flows through Asturias; it is one of the longest tributaries of the Asturias.

== Course and features ==
Beginning in Valvidares, Sariego, the Nora continues through the concejos of Siero and Noreña. In its final kilometers, it serves as a natural border between Oviedo and Llanera first, and between Oviedo and Las Regueras later. It is located between Priañes (Oviedo), Santa María de Grado (Grado) and Tahoces (Las Regueras). Near its outlet, the landscape is beautiful.

The dam of the Priañes reservoir and a hydroelectric power station of the same name are owned by HC Energía. Sofoxo is a cave on the river's right bank; it was discovered by Count de la Vega del Sella. The Roman bridge, Puente del Romanon, spans the river at Pola de Siero, east of Oviedo.
