= Vigil (surname) =

Vigil (/viˈhɪl/ vee-HILL) is a Spanish surname.

== Origin ==
The Vigil surname comes from the word "vigil," which is from the Latin "vigilia," meaning "wakefulness." Richard D. Woods and Grace Alvarez-Altman write that the surname is, "descendant of Vigil (watchful); one born on the feast of the nativity. [E.S.] Refers to someone who is watchful and vigilant. Asturian name. [J.A.]." Woods and Alvarez-Altman refer to Elsdon C. Smith and Julio de Atienza as sources of their information. However, the work by Smith, Dictionary of American Family Names does not contain information on the name Vigil. The surname may have come from the town of Vigil, in Asturias, Spain. Julio de Atienza relates that the name Vigil is of Asturian origin in Nobiliario español.

The name is especially prevalent in the Rio de la Plata region and in New Mexico.

== Notable people ==
Notable people with the surname include:

- Alicia Vigil (born 1995), DragonForce bassist
- Constancio C. Vigil (1876–1954), Uruguayan-Argentine writer and prominent publisher
- Joe Vigil (1929–2025), American athletics coach
- Martina Vigil-Montoya (1856–1916), Native American ceramics painter
- Olga Vigil (born 1970), Cuban basketball player
- Robert Vigil (born 1953), American politician from New Mexico
- Samuel Vigil (1929–2019), American politician from New Mexico
- Sergio Vigil (born 1965), Argentine field hockey player and coach
- Tim Vigil, American comics artist
