= La Collá, Siero =

Coordinates: 43.433333°N 5.616667°W

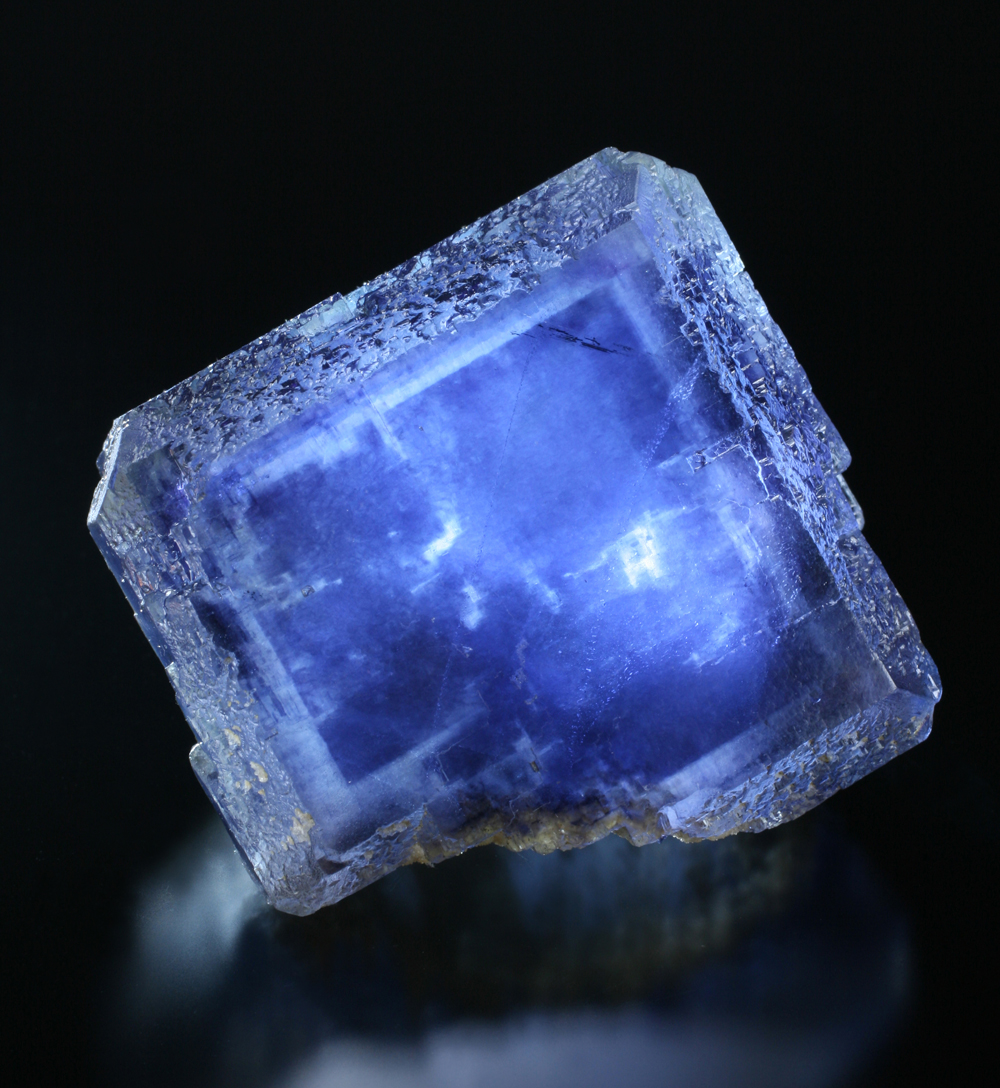
Fluorite, La Collá, Asturias, Spain

La Collá (previously La Collada) is a parish (administrative division) in Siero, a municipality within the province and autonomous community of Asturias, in northern Spain.

It is 6.67 km^{2} (2.58 sq mi) in size, and is situated at an elevation of 737 m (2,418 ft) above sea level. The population is 237 (INE 2007). The postal code is 33519.

== Villages and hamlets ==
- La Collatrás (previously Atrás)
- Ceñal
- Fresno (previously El Fresno)
- Güergu (previously Huergo)
