= Valdesoto =

Parish in Siero, Asturias, Spain

Coordinates: 43°21′46″N 5°39′29″W

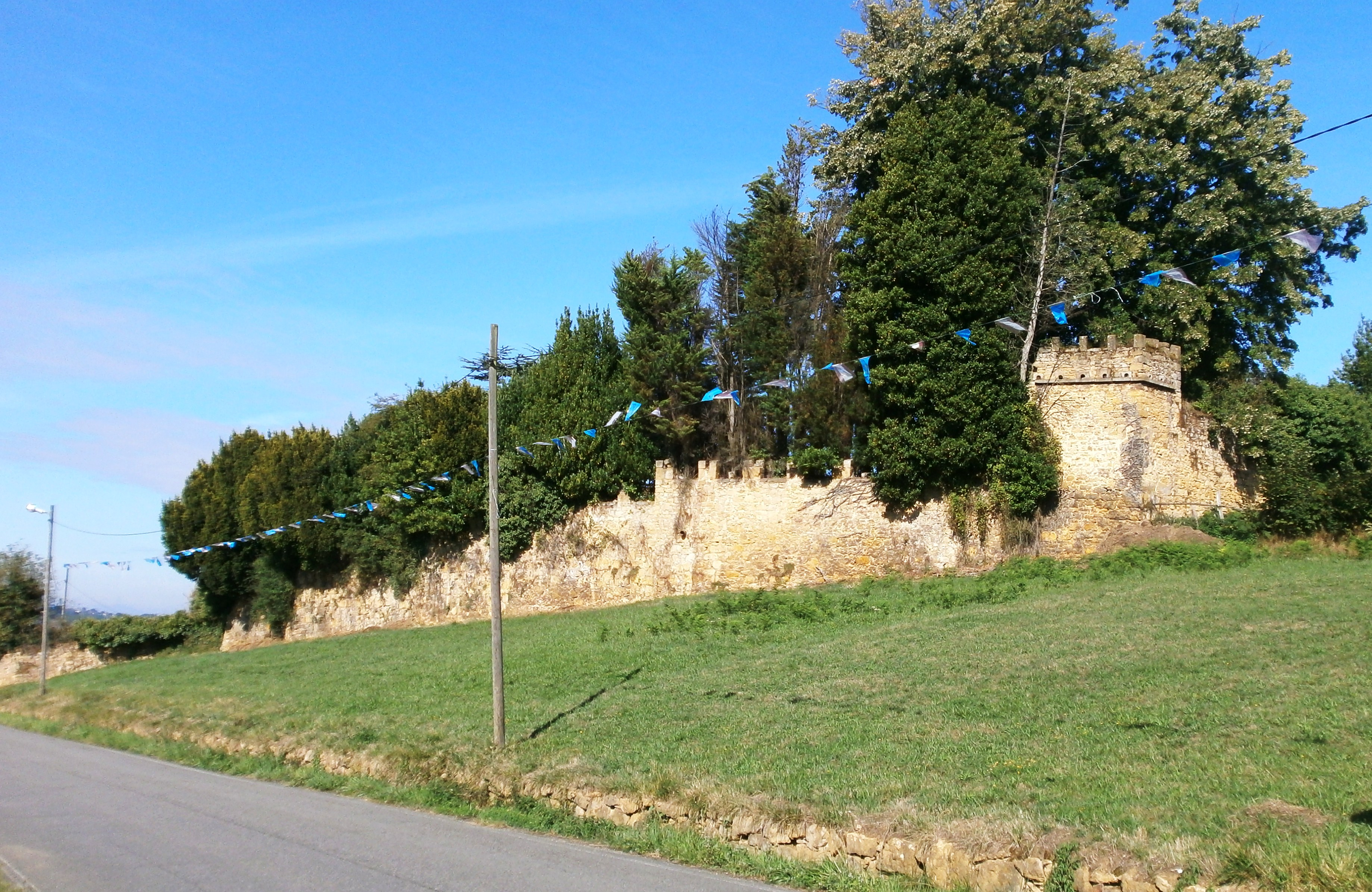
Palace of Valdesoto

Valdesoto is a parish located in the southeastern part of Siero, a municipality (conceyu) in the province and autonomous community of Asturias in northern Spain. It is consecrated to Saint Felix. There are 15 villages within Valdesoto. The population as of 2005 was 1967 inhabitants. The postcode is 33938.

Valdesoto occupies a wide plateau or valley surrounded by mountains, with masses of trees, and is crossed by several creeks and streams, including one that crosses the parish from north to south, with the same name as Valdesoto. The main routes are the AS-1, called Minera Autovía between Gijón and Mieres, the AS-246, called the Carretera Carbonera between Gijón and Langreo, provincial roads and SI-8 SI-11 SI-16 . In addition, the Cantabrian motorway passes close to the parish, in liaison with the municipal capital, Pola de Siero, just 4 kilometers from Valdesoto. The parish is also crossed by the narrow gauge railway between Gijón and FEVE Laviana, with two stops within its boundaries.

The parish derives its name etymologically from the geographical description: the conjunction of the words "valley" and "soto" (mountain, forest, village site trees in riparian or meadow). The older form, Valle de Soto, has become Valdesoto.

== Culture ==
Valdesoto is notable for its festivals, dedicated to San Felix, occurring the second weekend in August. The celebration, 'Les Carroca' festival, is a regional tourist attraction.

== Notable people ==
- Henry Nugent, Deputy-Governor of Gibraltar, Count of Valdesoto
