= Collao =

Parish in Siero, Asturias, Spain

Coordinates: 43°23′N 5°3′W

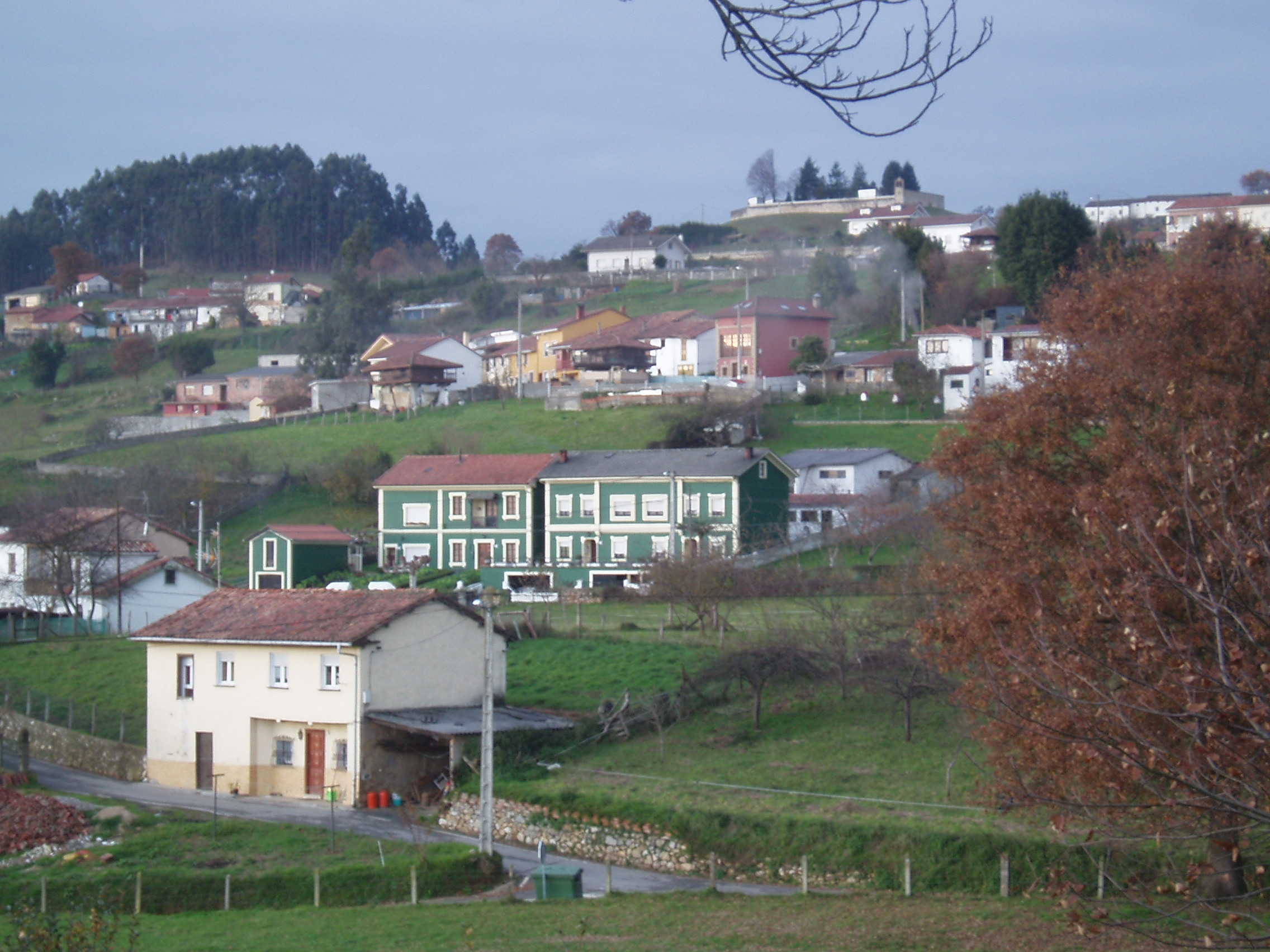
Collao, 2005

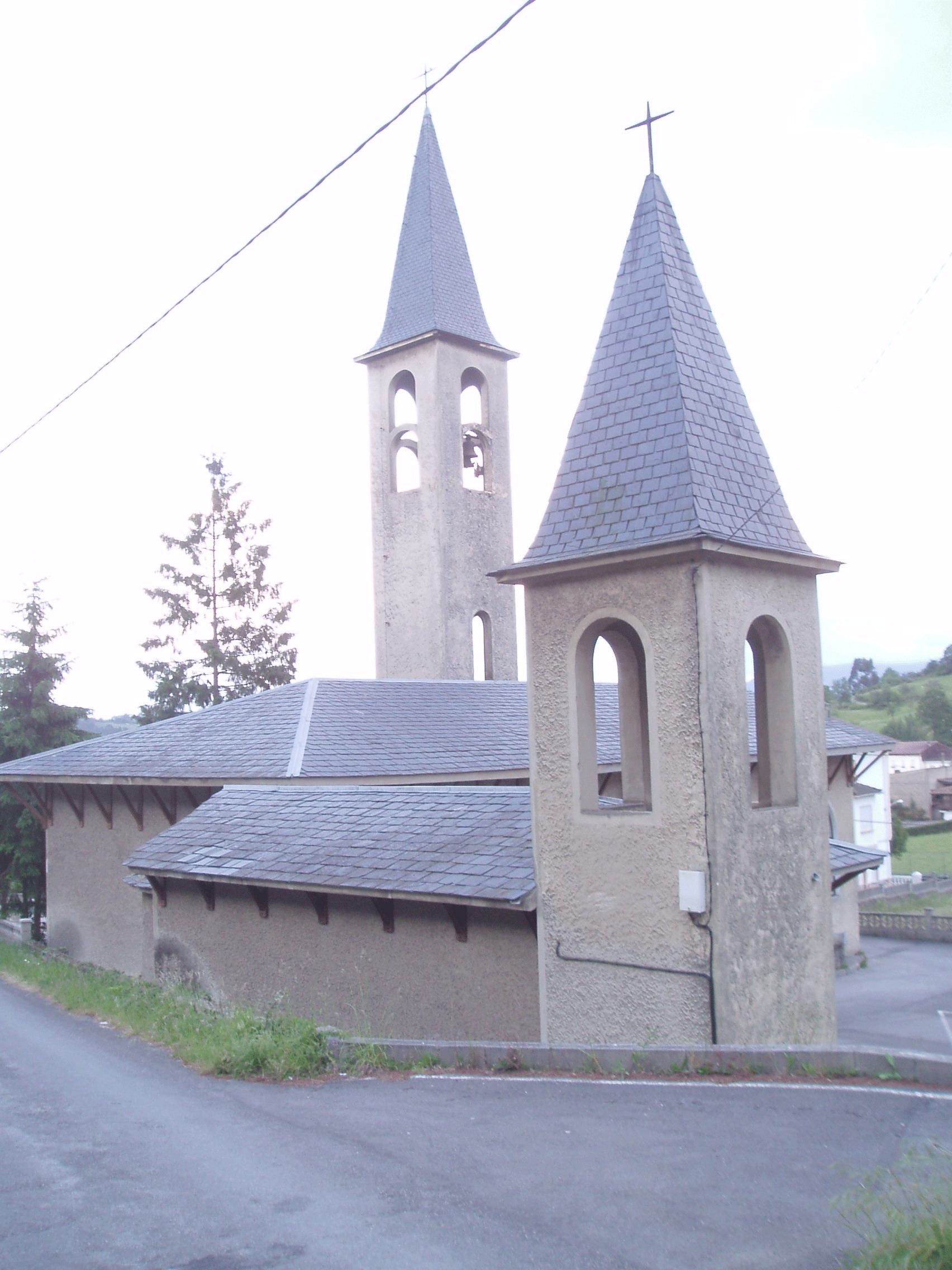
Church of San Cristóbal de Collao, 2006

Collao is a parish (administrative division) in Siero, a municipality within the province and autonomous community of Asturias, in northern Spain. The parish is located on Highway AS-113.

It is 0.27 km^{2} (0.10 sq mi) in size, and is situated at an elevation of 230 m (750 ft) above sea level. The population is 488 (INE 2006). The postal code is 33518.

Collao and other nearby parishes, such as Lieres and Carbayín, are historically associated with Andalusian mining.

== Culture ==
Collao's patron saint festivities honor San Cristóbal, and are held every year on the first Sunday of July.

The Gazetteer of SADEI identifies five notable sites within the parish: The Cirigüeyu, Cordón, Fuentemil, Llorián and La Quintana.

Buildings unique to Collao include the Church of San Cristóbal de Collao, the old public school (now converted into a community center), and the Source of Veneros. Currently, there are two associations in Collao of social and cultural interest. The oldest of these is the Society of Celebration, which each year organizes the patron saint festival. The other is the Neighborhood Association, whose office is located in the school administration building.
