= Tiñana =

Parish in Asturias, Spain

Coordinates: 43°22′06″N 5°45′16″W

Tiñana is a parish in Siero, a municipality within the province and autonomous community of Asturias, in northern Spain. It has a surface area of 6.89 km^{2} (2.66 sq mi) and, as of 2023, a population of 1,018.

Santa Maria Tiñana is an eighteenth-century church dedicated to Our Lady of the Visitation.

== General references ==
- Diccionario geográfico universal, 9: Dedicado a la Reina Nuestra Señora. José Torner. 1833. p. 780.
