= Santolaya de Vixil =

Coordinates: 43°22′57″N 5°38′16″W

Santolaya de Vixil

Santolaya de Vixil is a parish (administrative division) in Siero, a municipality within the province and autonomous community of Asturias, in northern Spain. The center is about 3 km (1.9 mi) from the capital, Pola de Siero.

== Villages ==
- El Cantu
- Casa Fael
- Casa Masín
- La Casona
- El Castañéu
- La Cuesta
- Les Escueles
- El Molín Nuevu
- La Peñuca
- La Quintana Coleta
- La Quintana'l Cura
- La Quintana la Iglesia
- La Quintana'l Maestru
- La Rebollá
- La Retoral
- El Río ente Casa
- El Riquixu
- La Torre
- La Vaduga
- Vixil
- El Xalé
- Xunta la Iglesia
