= Church of San Esteban de Aramil =

Coordinates: 43.3846°N 5.6185°W

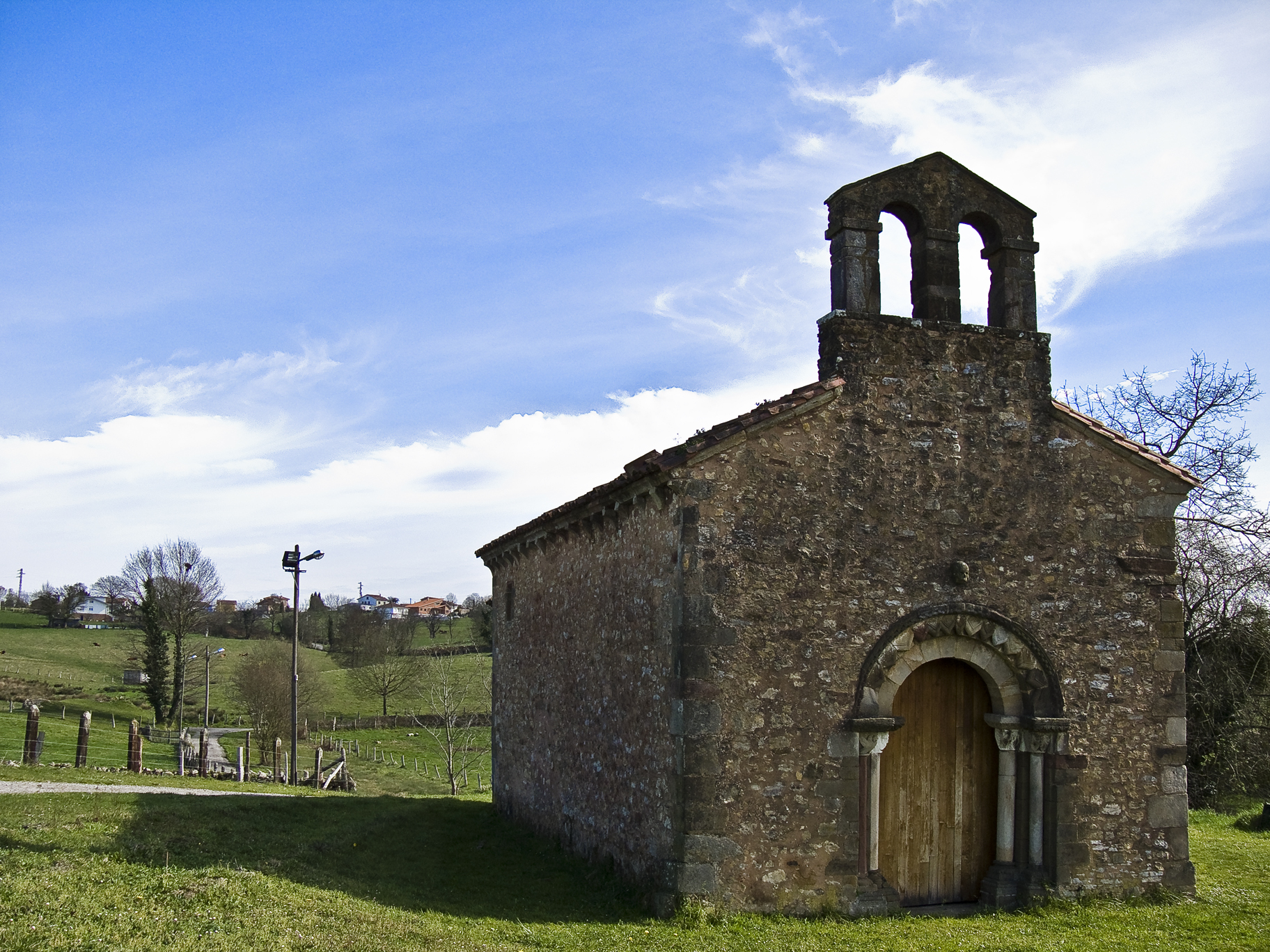
- Church of San Esteban de Aramil
- Location: Asturias, Spain

The Church of San Esteban de Aramil (Spanish: Iglesia de San Esteban de Aramil) is a church in the parish of Arami, Asturias, Spain. The church was first mentioned in documents in 1240 and was declared a cultural monument in 1960.

== History ==
The church is of the Romanesque style, popular between the 10th and 13th centuries, but the church itself cannot be dated more exactly. It was first mentioned in documents from 1240 concerning a donation of goods to the monastery of Valdediós by Alvar Diaz and his wife.

There are two theories concerning its origin; one is that it is the last remaining remnant of a monastery and the other is that it is a nobleman's church, which would have served both as the chapel for the castle and the church for the neighboring town.

It was granted Cultural Monument status on March 23, 1960, which was published in the Official State Bulletin (BOE), on 29 June 1960.

== Architecture and fittings ==
The church has the classic features of Romanesque architecture; it has a rectangular nave terminated at the southern end by a semicircular apse. Sculptural ornamentation of the church includes the doors, located on the western side of the church and in the apse.

=== The West Portal ===
The semi-circular archivolts formed the West portal, its outside wall is patterned with zigzag, and inside wall is plain. The west door has a semi-circular arch with two semi-arches and screens that rely on separate columns. Besides these two columns, there are plant motifs and chequered canopy on all archivolts, formed by shafts supported on bases that have carved lilies forming the columns' capitals.

=== The South Portal ===
The southern section is less important in addition to being smaller although it is similar in design to the western door. The South portal is also formed by two semi-circular archivolts, The interior wall is decorated with Zamoran scrolls of Norman origin, and the exterior wall has pointy heads biting and a round molding, showing various imaginary animals.

=== The Apse ===
There is a small central window in the apse, only the cornice is decorated, this semi-circular archivolts window ha corbels and a canopy.

== See also ==
- Asturian art
- Catholic Church in Spain
