= Siero =

- Municipality
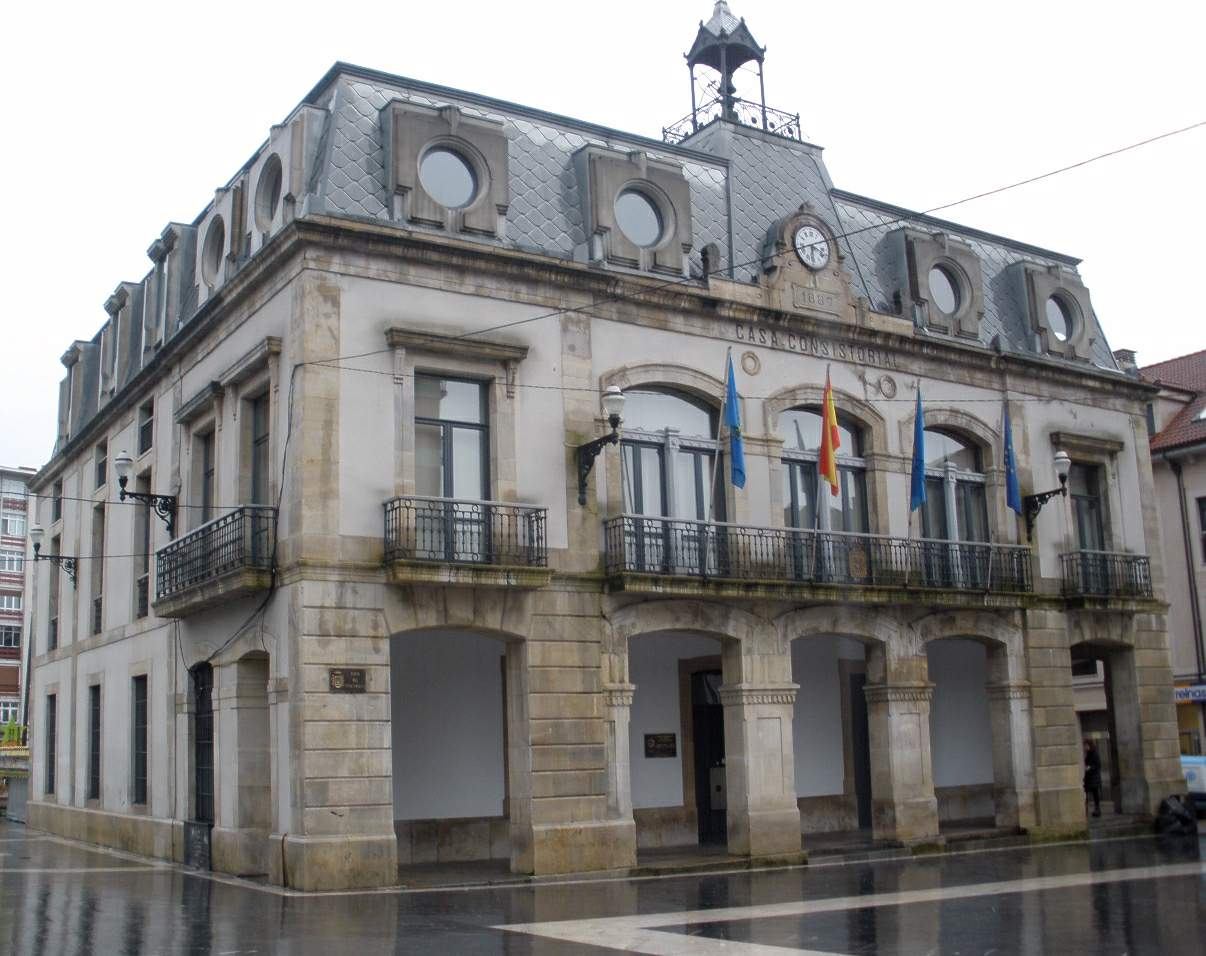
- The town hall at La Pola Siero

- Flag Coat of arms

- Location of Siero

- Location in Spain
- Coordinates: 43°23′N 5°39′W
- Country: Spain
- Autonomous community: Asturias
- Province: Asturias
- Comarca: Oviedo
- Capital: Pola de Siero

Government
  - Alcalde: Ángel García González (PSOE)

Area
  - Total: 211.60 km^{2} (81.70 sq mi)
- Elevation: 0 m (0 ft)

Population (2023)
  - Total: 52,194
  - Density: 246.66/km^{2} (638.86/sq mi)
- Demonym: sierense
- Time zone: UTC+1 (CET)
  - Summer (DST): UTC+2 (CEST)
- Postal code: 33510
- Official language(s): Asturian
- Website: Official website

Siero is a municipality of the autonomous community of Asturias, in northern Spain. With a population of 52,194 as of 2023, Siero is the fourth most populous municipality in Asturias. It has a total of 29 parishes, with the largest being Lugones; its capital parish is La Pola Siero. It is located centrally within Asturias, and the northernmost point of Siero is about 10 km from Asturias' largest city, Gijón, and the shores of the Cantabrian Sea.

== Origin of Name ==
The municipality appears to derive its name from a family of humble farmers with a variation of the common surname Sierra, denoting origins in mountainous regions.

== Geography ==
Siero's two main rivers, which run throughout much of the municipality, are the Nora and Noreña. Geographically, meadowlands make up a majority of the area within Siero. Like many other areas near the coast in Asturias, Siero tends to have a very temperate climate. It also enclaves the municipality of Noreña.

== History ==
The area now known as Siero has been inhabited by humans since the Paleolithic period, especially near the current parishes of Argüelles, Lugones, and Samartindianes. The Roman conquest of Iberia extended to the municipality, as evidenced by the numerous Roman bridges left over from that period.

Siero would not be referenced in writing until 905, when Alfonso III granted the church of San Martín de Siero to the Oviedo Cathedral. Other churches in the municipality were also donated to the Oviedo Cathedral throughout that century. There are also records of hospitals and leprosariums being constructed in the area 12th and 13th centuries; some of those continued operating until roughly the 18th century. On 14 August 1270, King Alfonso X granted the area its municipal charter, giving the area official recognition. Eighty years later, the region was split following the death of Alfonso XI, with Pedro I controlling Samartindianes and the rest of the region subject to Enrique II of Trastámara. Following Enrique II's ascent to the throne of Castile, he exempted Siero from taxes due to its inhabitants' support during the Castilian Civil War.

In the early 19th century, Siero was invaded multiple times by the French during the Napoleonic Wars, until the French withdrew from Asturias in 1812. Throughout 20th century, due to the growth of the coal mining industry in the region, Siero became one of the fastest growing municipalities in Asturias, more than doubling its population from the beginning of the century to the end. In modern times, the tertiary sector has become Siero's largest, with construction and dairy farming still remaining relevant.

Siero currently consists of the following 29 parishes:

Parishes of Siero
Aramil; Argüelles; Bobes; La Carrera; Celles; La Collá; Collao; Feleches; Granda; Hevia; Lieres; Limanes; Lugones; Marcenado; Muñó	La Paranza; La Pola Siero; Samartindianes; Samartino; San Juan de Arenas; Samiguel; Santolaya de Vixil; Santa Marina; Santa Marta de Carbayín; Santiago Arenas; Tiñana; Trespando; Valdesoto; Viella

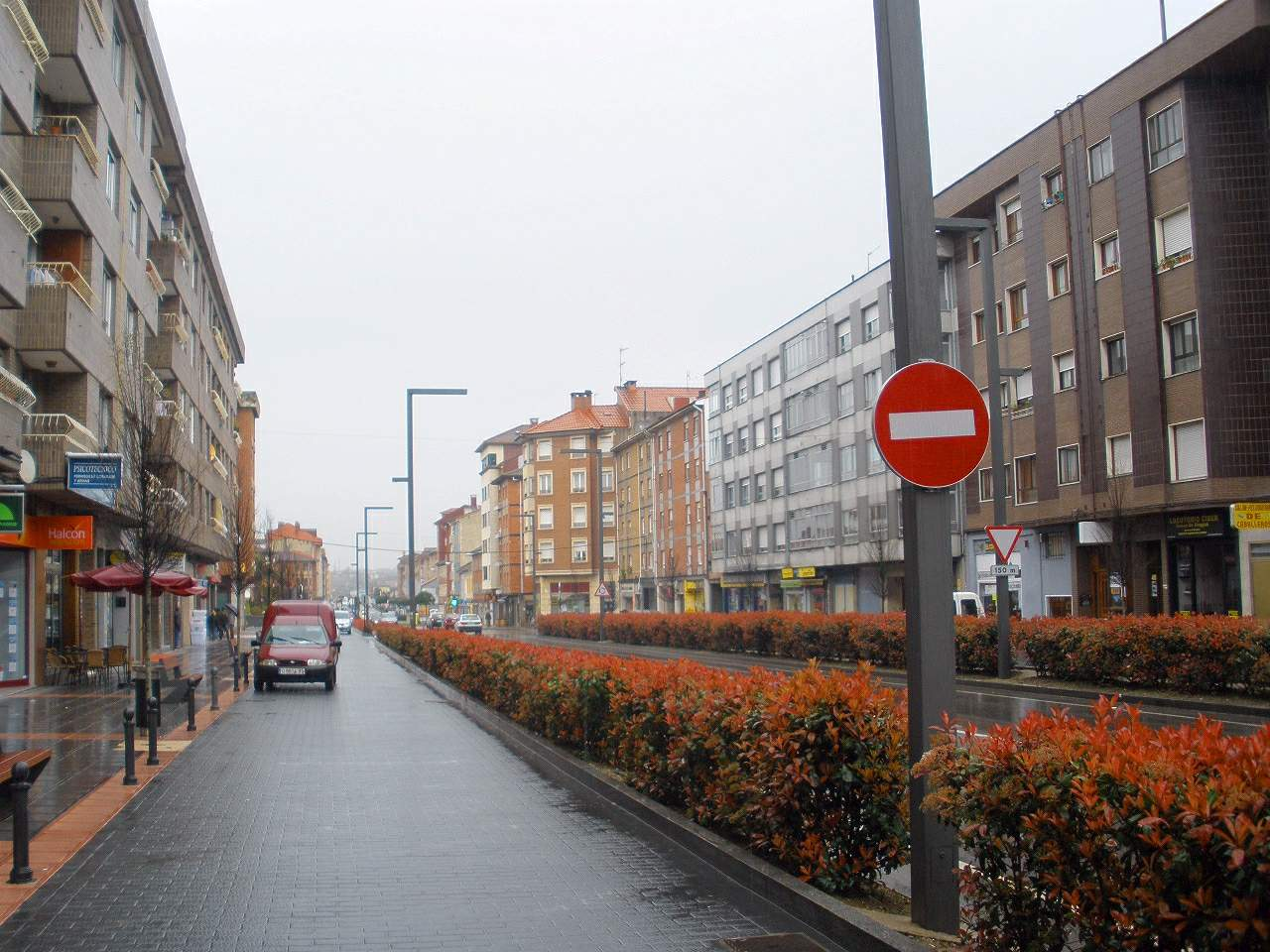
Lugones, the largest parish of Siero

== Politics ==
Councillors distribution in local elections since 1979
Key to parties Somos PCA–PCE IU–IX PSOE Conceyu UCD PINSI PVLF Cs CDS FAC PP CP AP Vox Independent
Election	Distribution	Mayor
1979	4 / 9 / 8	Manuel Marino Villa Díaz (PSOE)
1983	2 / 14 / 1 / 4	Manuel Marino Villa Díaz (PSOE)
1987	3 / 10 / 4 / 4	Manuel Marino Villa Díaz (PSOE)
1991	3 / 10 / 3 / 1 / 4	Manuel Marino Villa Díaz (PSOE)
1995	3 / 6 / 2 / 10	José Aurelio Álvarez Fernández (PP)
1999	2 / 8 / 1 / 10	
2003	2 / 8 / 1 / 10	Juan José Corrales Montequín (PSOE)
2007	1 / 8 / 1 / 2 / 1 / 8	
2007	1 / 8 / 1 / 2 / 1 / 8	José Antonio Noval Cueto (PP)
2011	3 / 7 / 1 / 2 / 6 / 6	Guillermo Martínez Suárez (PSOE)
2011	3 / 7 / 1 / 2 / 6 / 6	Eduardo Martínez Llosa (Foro)
2015	3 / 4 / 7 / 1 / 1 / 1 / 5 / 3	Ángel García González (PSOE)
2019	3 / 2 / 12 / 1 / 2 / 1 / 3 / 1	Ángel García González (PSOE)

== See also ==
- List of municipalities in Asturias
