= La Pola Siero =

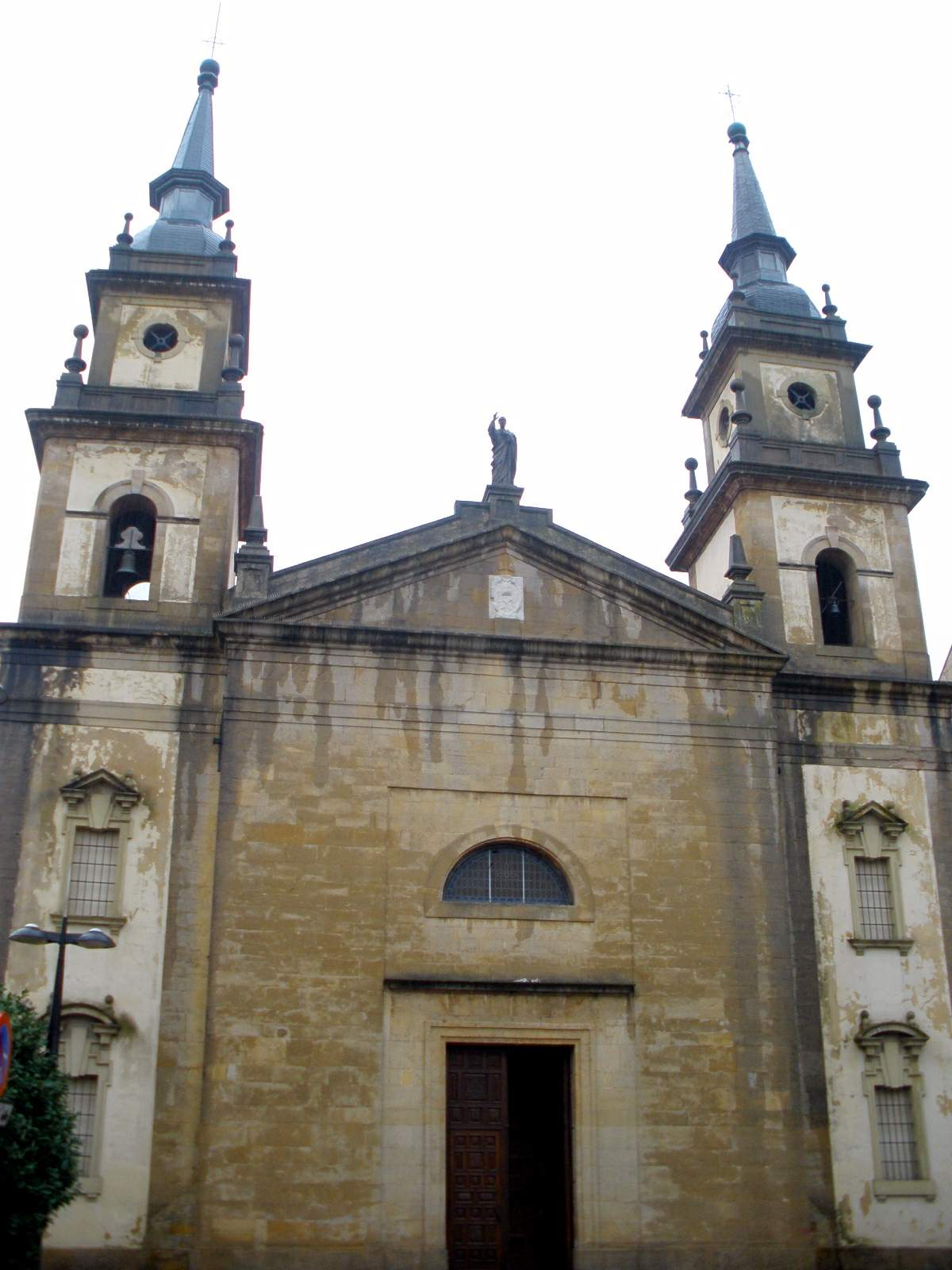
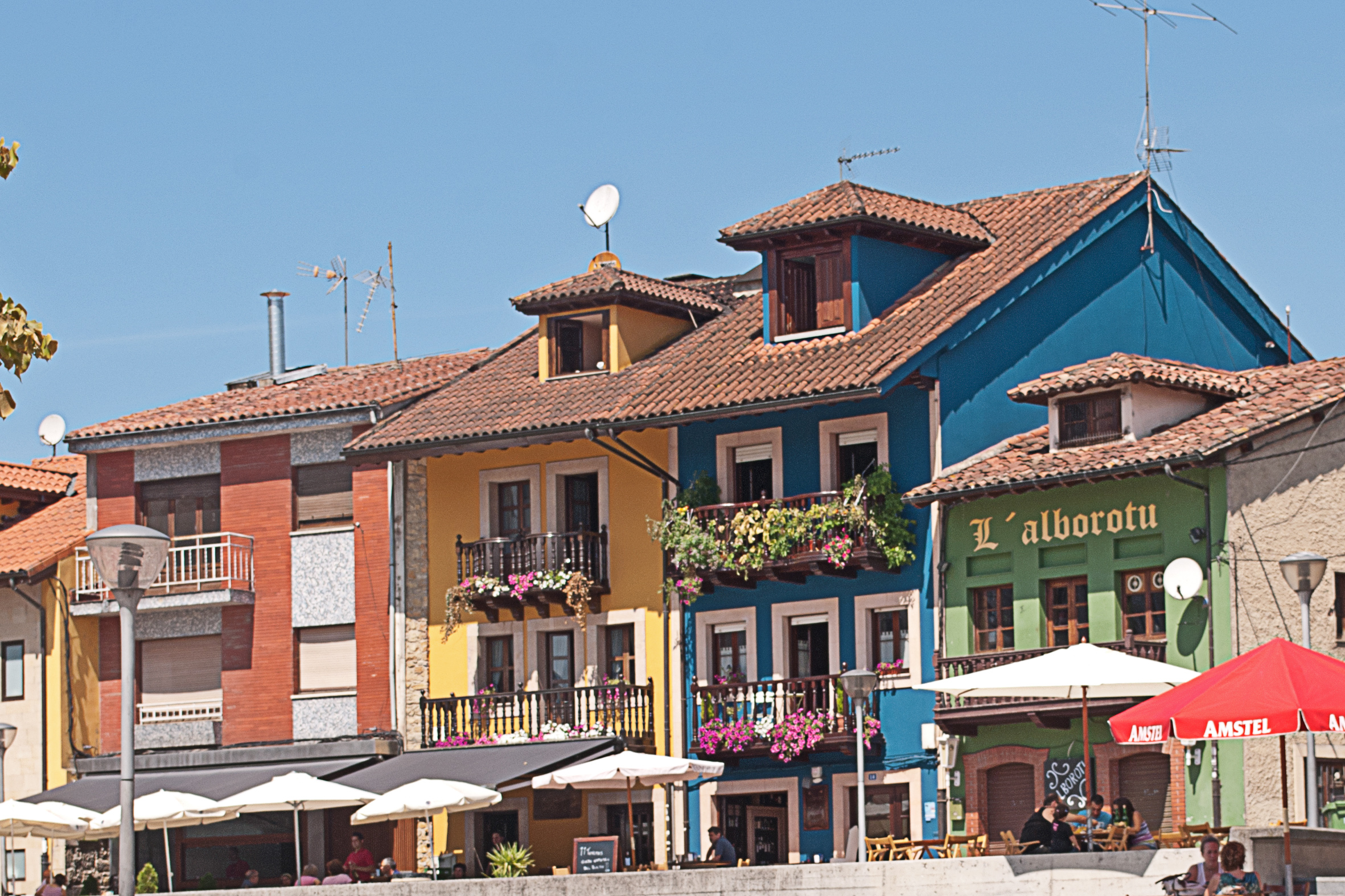
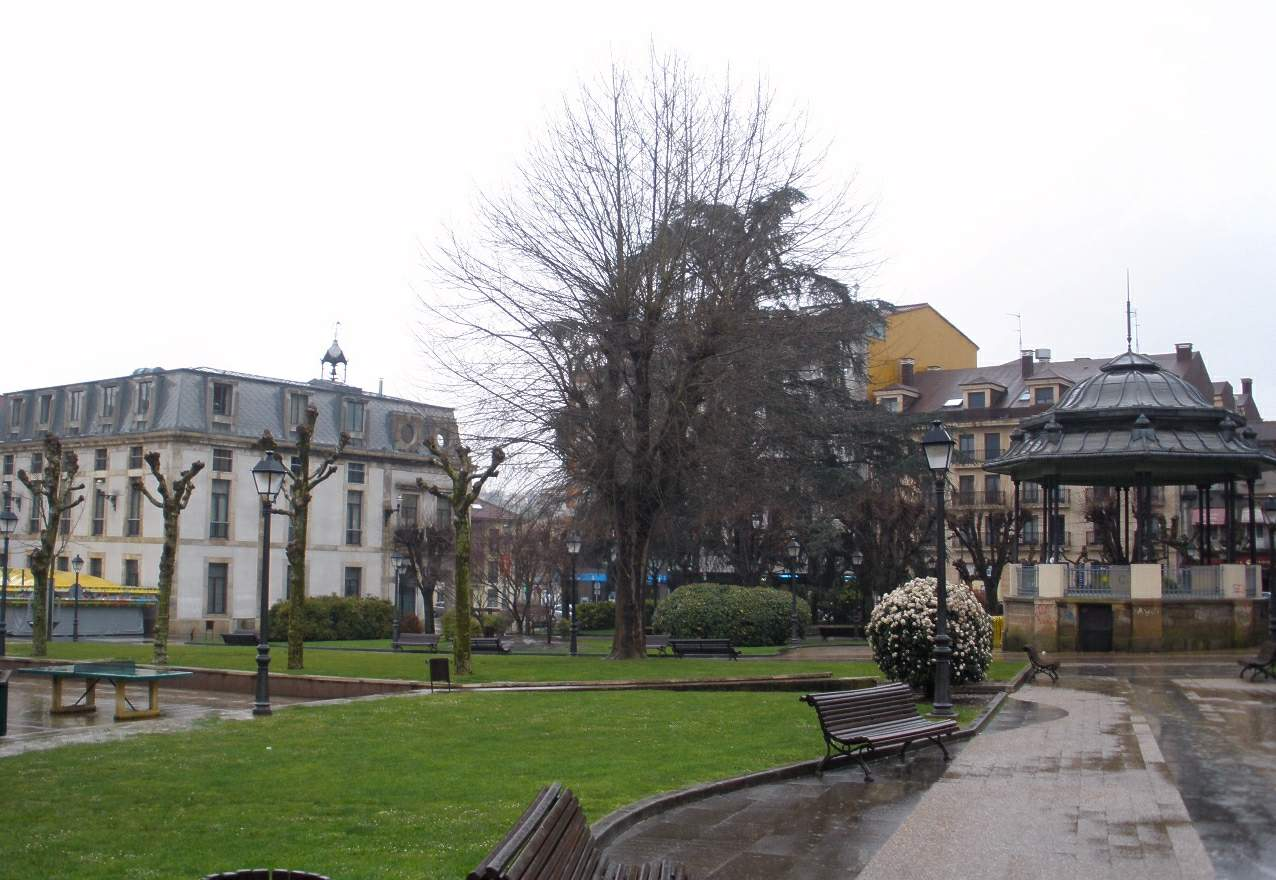
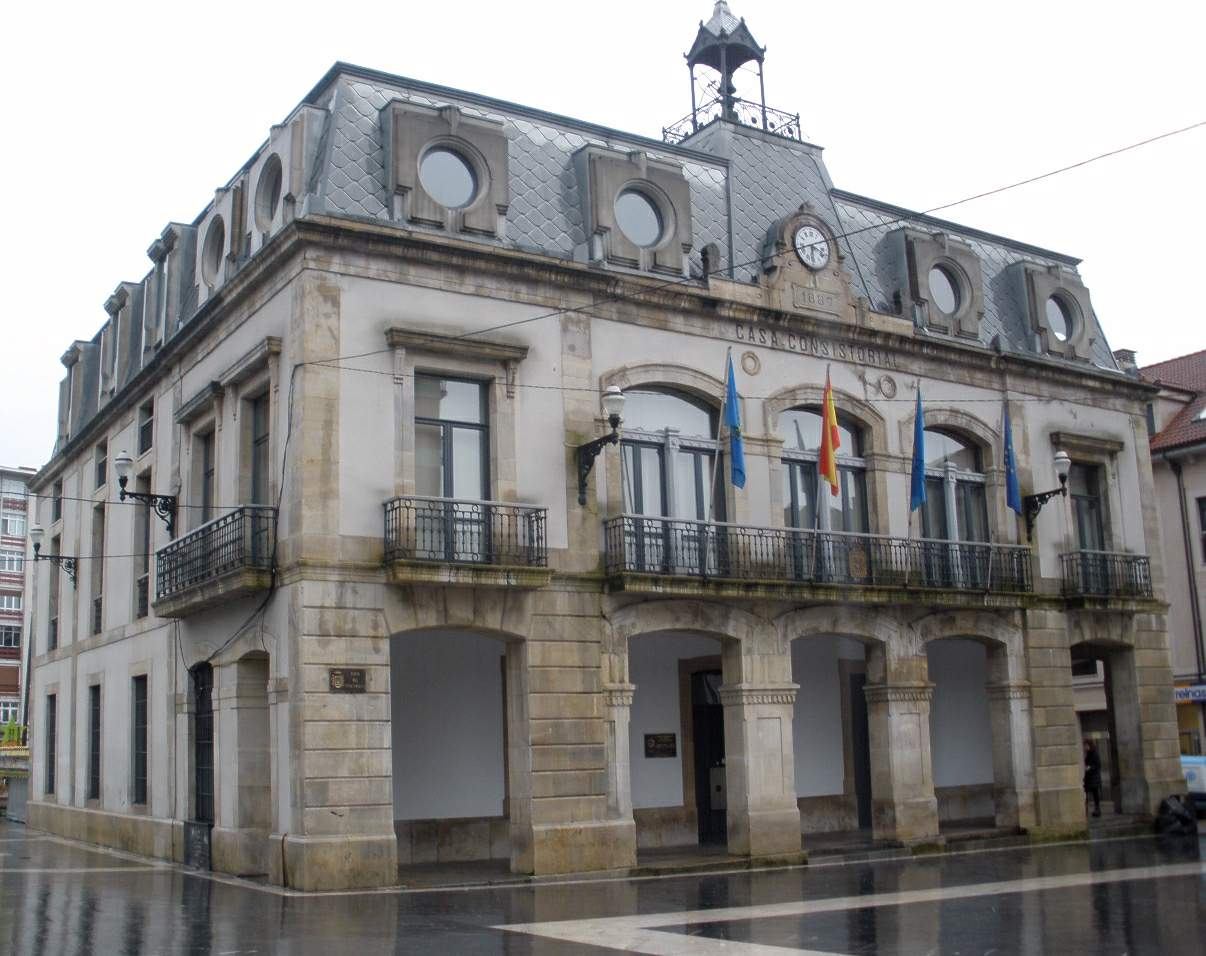
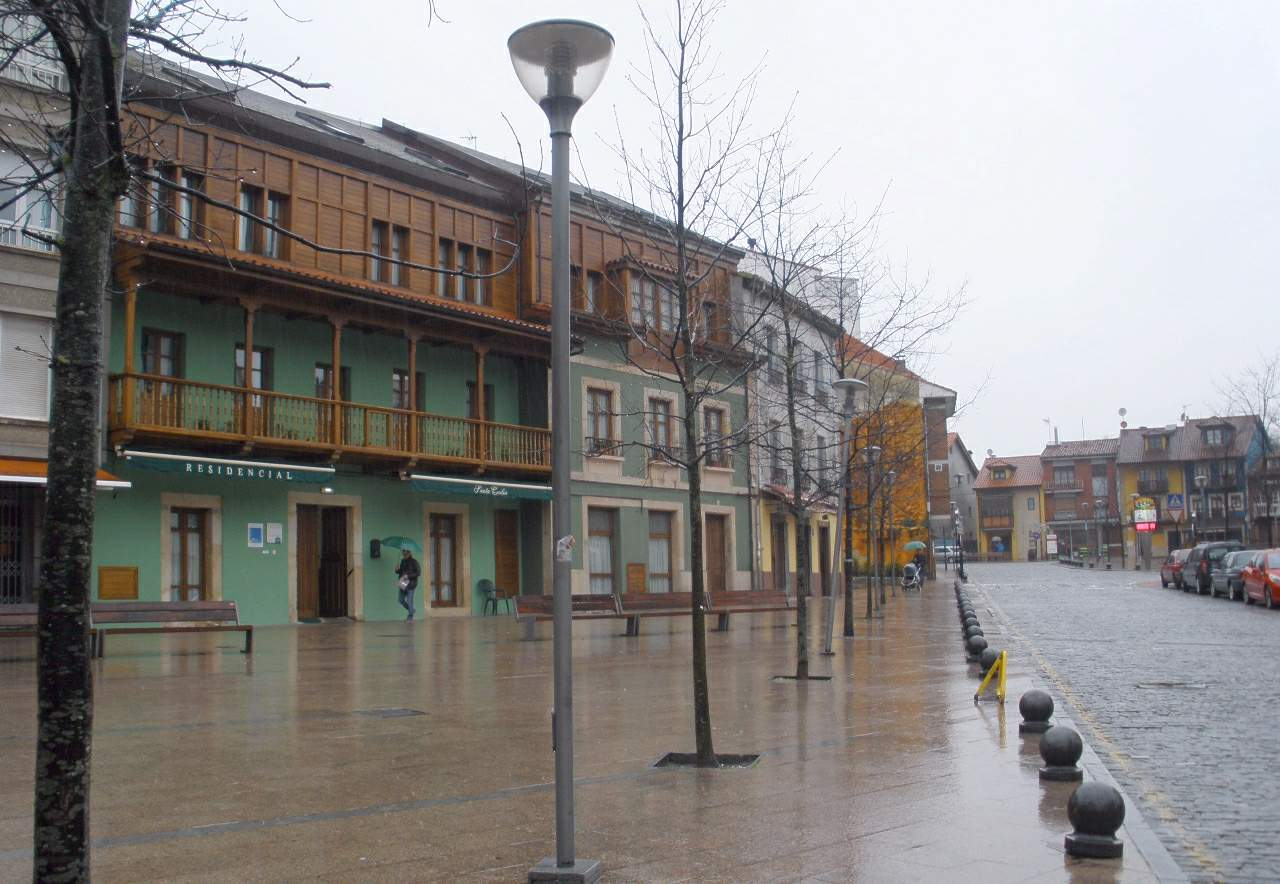
- From top: Church of San Pedro, 'Les Campes' Square, Alfonso X Park, Siero town hall, another view of 'Les Campes' square

- Flag Seal
- Interactive map of La Pola Siero
- Coordinates: 43°23′23″N 5°39′40″W
- Country: Spain
- Autonomous community: Asturias

Government
  - Mayor: Ángel Antonio García González

Population (1st January 2024)
  - Total: 12,855
- Time zone: UTC+1 (CET)
  - Summer (DST): UTC+2 (CET)
- Website: www.ayto-siero.es

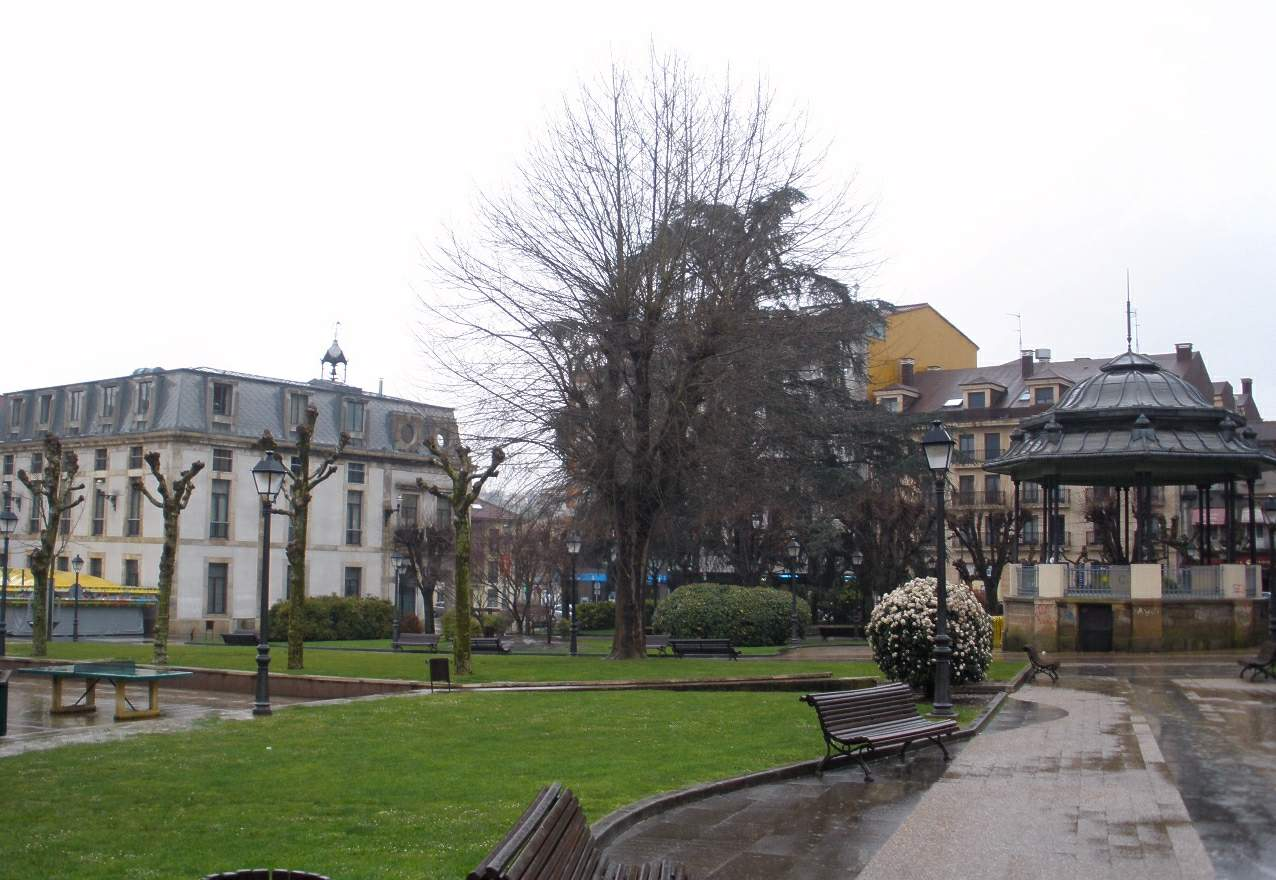
Pola de Siero public park

La Pola Siero (in Spanish Pola de Siero, and also known as La Pola colloquially) is a town in the autonomous community of Asturias on the north coast of the Kingdom of Spain. It is the administrative capital of the municipality (concejo) of Siero. Pola de Siero is located in the centre of Asturias, approximately 16 km (10 mi) east of the regional capital Oviedo and 16 km south of Gijón.

Siero borders on the municipalities of Gijón to the north, Langreo and San Martín del Rey Aurelio to the south, Llanera and Oviedo to the west, and Sariego, Nava, and Bimenes to the east. It entirely surrounds the municipality of Noreña and touches Villaviciosa at one point: La Peña de los Cuatro Jueces (The Mount of the Four Judges)

According to the Instituto Nacional de Estadística (Spain), Pola de Siero has a population of 12,615, making it the largest population centre in the municipality and the seventh largest in Asturias.

Pola de Siero was founded by a charter of King Alfonso X in 1270. On the site prior to that date there was a hostel which provided accommodation and sustenance for pilgrims travelling the Way of St. James (Camino de Santiago), en route to or from Santiago de Compostela.

The charter allowed the formation of the town, imposed an annual tax on the inhabitants to be paid to the crown, and granted them a license to hold a weekly market in the town square, Plaza les Campes. This market, a feature of Pola de Siero which continues, every Tuesday, to this day, was the decisive factor in the development of the town. With the market, the town became the focal point of a large rural area of fertile land, and thereafter other commercial and administrative functions followed.

== Notable people ==
- Javi Fuego (born 4 January 1984) is a former Spanish professional footballer who played as a defensive midfielder.
