= Eduardo Úrculo =

Spanish painter

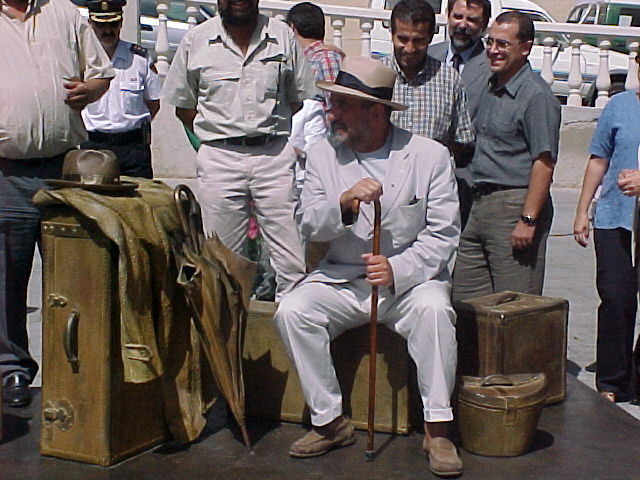
- Úrculo with one of his works in Fuerteventura
- Born: September 21, 1938; Santurtzi, Spain
- Died: March 31, 2003 (aged 64); Madrid, Spain
- Resting place: Oviedo, Asturias, Spain
- Education: Instituto de Enseñanza Media (Langreo); Círculo de Bellas Artes (Madrid); Escuela Nacional de Artes Gráficas (Madrid); La Grande Chaumière (Paris)
- Known for: Painting, sculpting
- Notable work: The Traveler (1992); Tribute to James Roldan (1993); The return of Williams B. Arrensberg (1993); Exaltation of the apple (1996); Culis monumentalibus (2001)
- Movement: Pop art, Expressionism, Neo-Cubism

"Life is the image of the romantic traveller, always turning away with his luggage. The face is what least interests me about the body; the back is more universal." (--Úrculo)

—

Eduardo Úrculo (21 September 1938 – 31 March 2003), was a Spanish pop artist who also worked in other art movements, including Expressionism and Neo-Cubism. Both painter and sculptor, he is notable for his portrayals of luggage, the gentleman's hat, and the female bottom. With El Equipo Crónica (“Chronicle Team”), formed by the artists Manolo Valdés and Rafael Solbes, Úrculo is considered one of the drivers of pop art in Spain.

== Early years ==
Born in Santurtzi, Basque Autonomous Community, Spain, Úrculo had at least two siblings, brothers Jose Maria Úrculo and Maria del Mar Úrculo. The family moved to the mining village of Langreo, Asturias in 1941 because of the hardships imposed on them after the Spanish Civil War. With a childhood marked by famine, he joined the Instituto de Enseñanza Media in 1948. His interest in drawing began here after Úrculo discovered the art of Henri de Toulouse-Lautrec, Vincent van Gogh. and Amedeo Modigliani in picture books.

At the age of 14, he dropped out of school to convalesce for several months from hepatitis and tuberculosis. During this time, he began to paint. When he was well enough, he started working in the mining company Carbones de La Nueva, where his father worked as a clerk.

Úrculo's first solo exhibition occurred in 1957 in La Felguera. In the same year, he became a cartoonist, drawing gangster comics illustrations in Oviedo. The following year, he received a grant from the Langreo City Council to study at Madrid's Círculo de Bellas Artes and at the Escuela Nacional de Artes Gráficas. Here, his spiky socialist realism was characterized by "lots of clenched fists and Guernica-style Picassoism". His drawings of factories have been described as "social painting" or "social expressionism". Úrculo's early black and white drawings were influenced by Francisco Goya. In 1958, he went to Paris and studied at the Académie de la Grande Chaumière.

== Career ==
Returning in 1959 to Oviedo, he opened a studio with the artist Zuco with whom he made the mosaic tile for ALSA. Military service took Úrculo to Tenerife in 1960 where he became acquainted with the surrealist artist Eduardo Westerdahl. Here he painted the only abstract work of his career. In 1962, he returned to Paris and painted in the style of figurative expressionism. Four years later, he went to Ibiza. In 1967, in Stockholm, he first encountered the American pop art of Andy Warhol, Roy Lichtenstein, and Robert Rauschenberg which he described as "un flechazo" ("love at first sight"). He drew inspiration from this by incorporating vibrant color into his pieces.

In the 1970s, while traveling to Portugal, Morocco and Ibiza, Úrculo began his many works featuring the female nude. Referred to as Úrculo's "Period Erotica", he emphasized "el culo" (the backside). Culis monumentalibus (2001), a provocative and massive sculpture measuring 4 m (13 ft) in height, is located in Oviedo's square, and caused great controversy when it was installed.

Úrculo's first bronze sculpture was created in 1984, and others soon followed, such as Homenaje a Santiago Roldán ("Tribute to James Roldan", 1993, Barcelona's Olympic Village), El regreso de Williams B. Arrensberg ("The return of Williams B. Arrensberg", 1993, Oviedo), and Exaltación de la manzana ("Exaltation of the apple", 1996, Villaviciosa). Perhaps his best-known bronze sculpture is El Viajero (Local Asturian dialect for "The Traveller") - the same (1993) piece described earlier by its formal name, "The Return of Williams B. Arrensberg". Now in the middle of a square, in the heart of Oviedo (Asturias) one can find our returning traveler, with bags, coat, and umbrella.

Returning to Cubism, Úrculo painted still lifes of bottles, cases, and fruit in the manner of Juan Gris.

In his later years, he painted geishas using eastern iconography, both as romantic escapism and as a sexual icon. He also painted many variations of hats. He participated in the First Biennial of Art in the City of Oviedo and, in 1986, was honored at the Painting Contest of Luarca. His last individual exhibitions were held at the Fundación Marcelino Botin of Santander and in the gallery Teresa Square, in Valladolid (2000). In addition to Spain, his works were displayed at expositions, collections and biennials in Germany, France, Cuba, Iran, and the United States.

== Personal life ==
The marriage to his first wife, Annie Chanvallon, was dissolved. He married secondly Victoria Hidalgo. He had one son, Yoann.

Úrculo died of a heart attack in 2003 at the Madrid home of Salvador Dalí.

== Honors ==
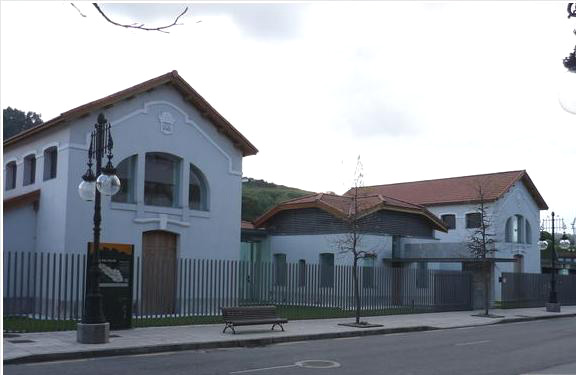
Pinacoteca Eduardo Úrculo in La Felguera.

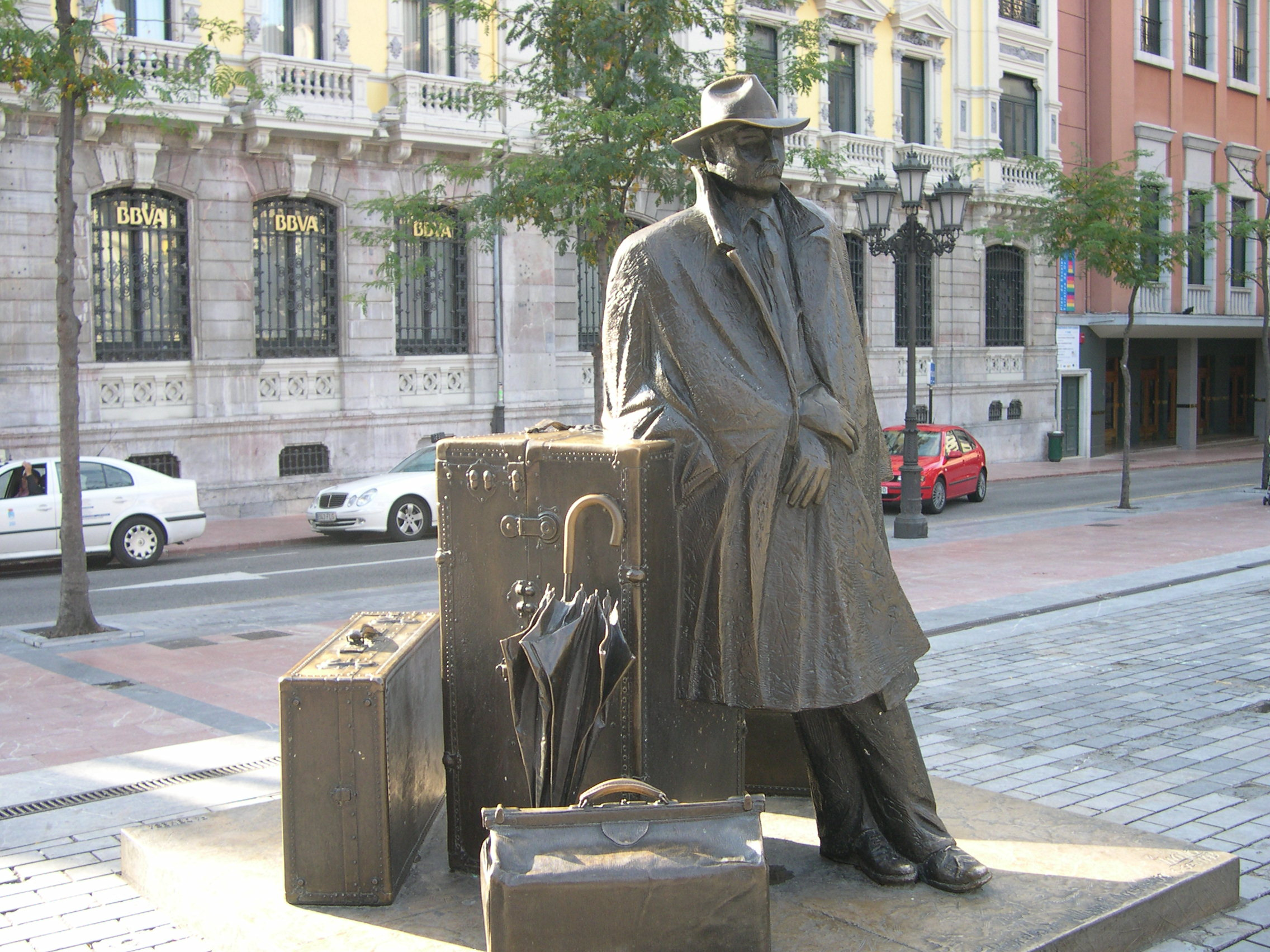
El regreso de Williams B. Arrensberg ("The return of Williams B. Arrensberg"). Oviedo.

- Úrculo was to have received Spain's highest artistic honor, the Gold Medal in Fine Arts, in the summer of 2003.
- The Pinacoteca Eduardo Úrculo, an arts center and municipal art gallery, is located in La Felguera.
- Plaza Eduardo Úrculo, located in Oviedo, opened June 2003. It was designed by the architect Cesar Fernandez Cuevas.

== Displayed works ==
His works are on display at:

- Biblioteca Nacional, Madrid
- Bullfighting Museum, Madrid
- City of Oviedo
- Coleccion de Arte Contemporaneo de AENA, Madrid
- Drawing Museum "Castillo de Larre "Huesca
- Galieria Nazionale d'Arte Moderna, Rome
- International Museum of Contemporary Art in Lanzarote
- International Museum of the Resistance Salvador Allende, Chile
- Museo de Bellas Artes de Asturias, Oviedo
- Museo Municipal, Madrid
- Museo Nacional Centro de Arte Reina Sofia, Madrid
- Museum of Contemporary Art ACA, Tenerife
- Museum of Contemporary Art in Vilafamés, Castellón
- Museum of Contemporary Art in Bogota, Colombia
- Museum of Contemporary Spanish Engravings, Marbella
- National Museum of Bangladesh, Dhaka
- Sculpture Museum, Alcala de Henares, Madrid
