= NS 8500 =

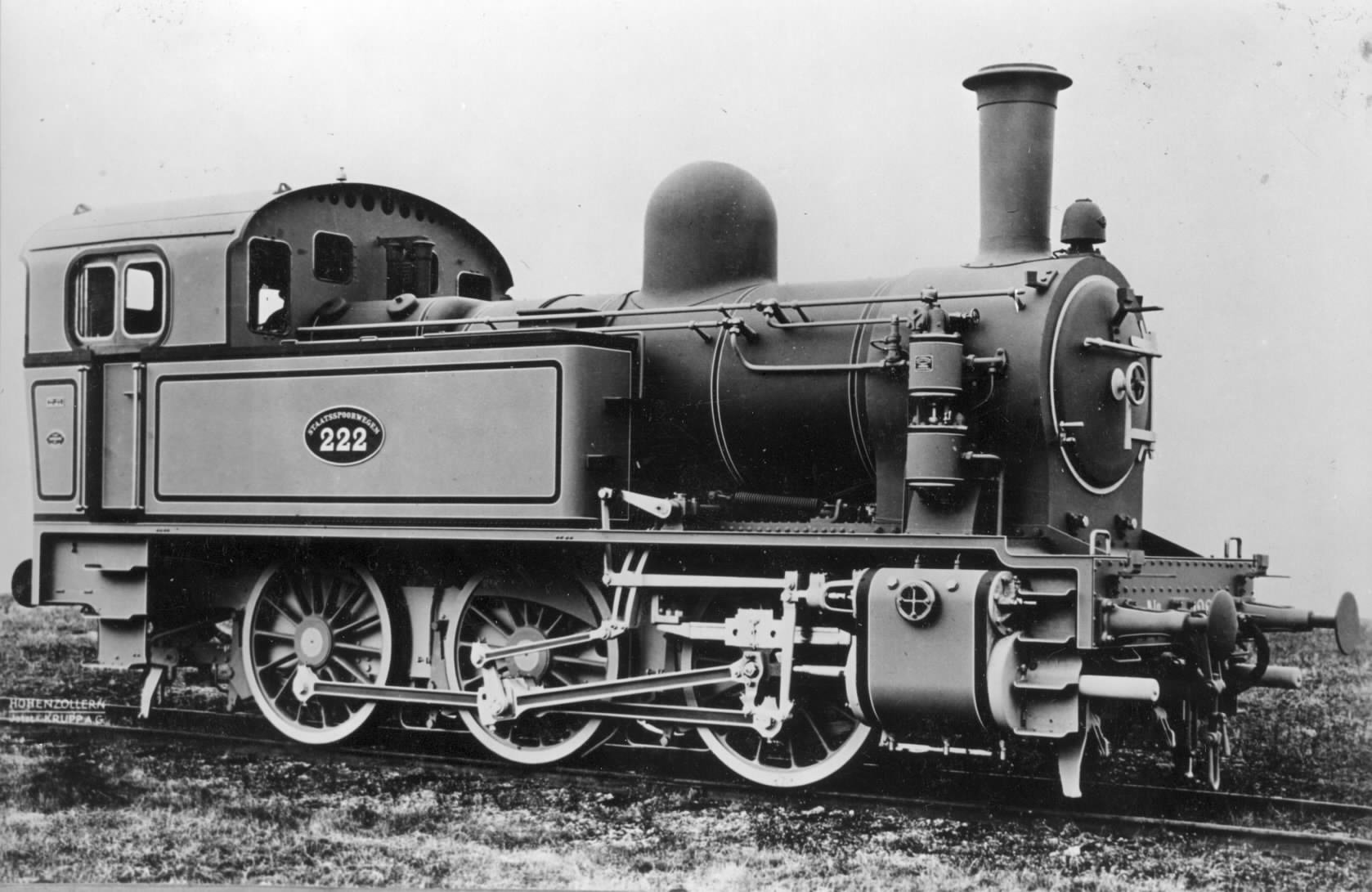
Type and origin
- Power type: Steam
- Builder: Hohenzollern, Henschel & Sohn
- Build date: 1915, 1920
- Total produced: serie 1: 9 serie 2: 6
Specifications
- Configuration
  - Whyte: 0-6-0
  - UIC: C
- Gauge: 1,435 mm (4 ft 8 1/2 in)
- Driver dia.: 1,400 mm (4 ft 7 in)
- Length: Serie 1: 9,220 mm (30 ft 3 in); Serie 2: 9,320 mm (30 ft 7 in)
- Loco weight: Serie 1: 48 t (53 short tons; 47 long tons); Serie 2: 49 t (54 short tons; 48 long tons)
- Fuel type: Coal
- Fuel capacity: 2 t (2.2 short tons; 2.0 long tons)
- Water cap.: Serie 1: 4.5 m^{3} (990 imp gal); Serie 2: 4.1 cubic metres (900 imp gal)
- Firebox
  - Grate area: 1.47 m^{2} (15.8 sq ft)
- Boiler pressure: 12 bar (170 psi)
- Cylinders: 2
- Cylinder size: serie 1: 450 mm × 600 mm (18 in × 24 in) serie 2: 485 mm × 600 mm (19.1 in × 23.6 in)
- Valve gear: Walschaerts
Performance figures
- Maximum speed: 60 km/h (37 mph)
- Tractive effort: Serie 1: 71.49 kN (16,070 lbf); Serie 2: 83.16 kN (18,700 lbf)
Career
- Operators: NS
- Nicknames: Weesperpoortje
- Withdrawn: 1947 - 1952
- Disposition: All scrapped

The NS 8500 was a series of tank engines with the C (0-6-0) wheel layout of the Dutch Railways (NS) and its predecessor Maatschappij tot Exploitatie van Staatsspoorwegen (SS). They were manufactured by Hohenzollern and Henschel & Sohn.

== History ==
The construction of these locomotives was related to the fact that increasingly heavier passenger trains on the connecting line Amsterdam W.P. to Amsterdam C.S. had to be run. The shunting locomotives used earlier were too light for this. That is why this locomotive was built with relatively large driving wheels, with a diameter of 1,400 mm (4 ft 7^{1}/_{8} in). Furthermore, the wheelbase, that is the distance from centre to centre of the driving wheels, was relatively large, resulting in locomotives that had a very smooth running. Even at the maximum permitted speed of 60 km/h (37.2 mph).

They weren't really typical shunting locomotives either; The wheels were too large for this, but special coupler of train sets and thus these machines shuttled between the various Amsterdam stations.

SS numbers	NS numbers	Built date	Builder	Details
221	8501	1915	Hohenzollern	
222	8502	1915	Hohenzollern	
223	8503	1915	Hohenzollern	
224	8504	1915	Hohenzollern	
225	8505	1915	Hohenzollern	Sold to Spain, CFL 51
226	8506	1915	Hohenzollern	Sold to Spain, CFL 52
227	8507	1915	Hohenzollern	
228	8508	1915	Hohenzollern	
229	8509	1915	Hohenzollern	Sold to Spain, CFL 53
230	8510	1920	Henschel & Sohn	
231	8511	1920	Henschel & Sohn	
232	8512	1920	Henschel & Sohn	Sold to Spain, CFL 54
233	8513	1920	Henschel & Sohn	
234	8514	1920	Henschel & Sohn	Sold to Spain, CFL 55
235	8515	1920	Henschel & Sohn	

== Withdrawal and scrapping ==
Six locomotives were withdrawn from service in 1947 due to war damage. Locomotive 8515 was withdrawn from service in 1948 and locomotive 8510 was withdrawn from service in 1950.

In 1951 two more 8500s were withdrawn from service. The last five locomotives numbers: 8505, 8506, 8509, 8512 and 8514 were sold in 1952 to Ferrocarril de Langreo, the only standard gauge line in Spain. There, the locomotives were somewhat converted and served for a few years on a mining railway from Gijon to Langreo in Asturias, after which they were scrapped.

== Gallery ==
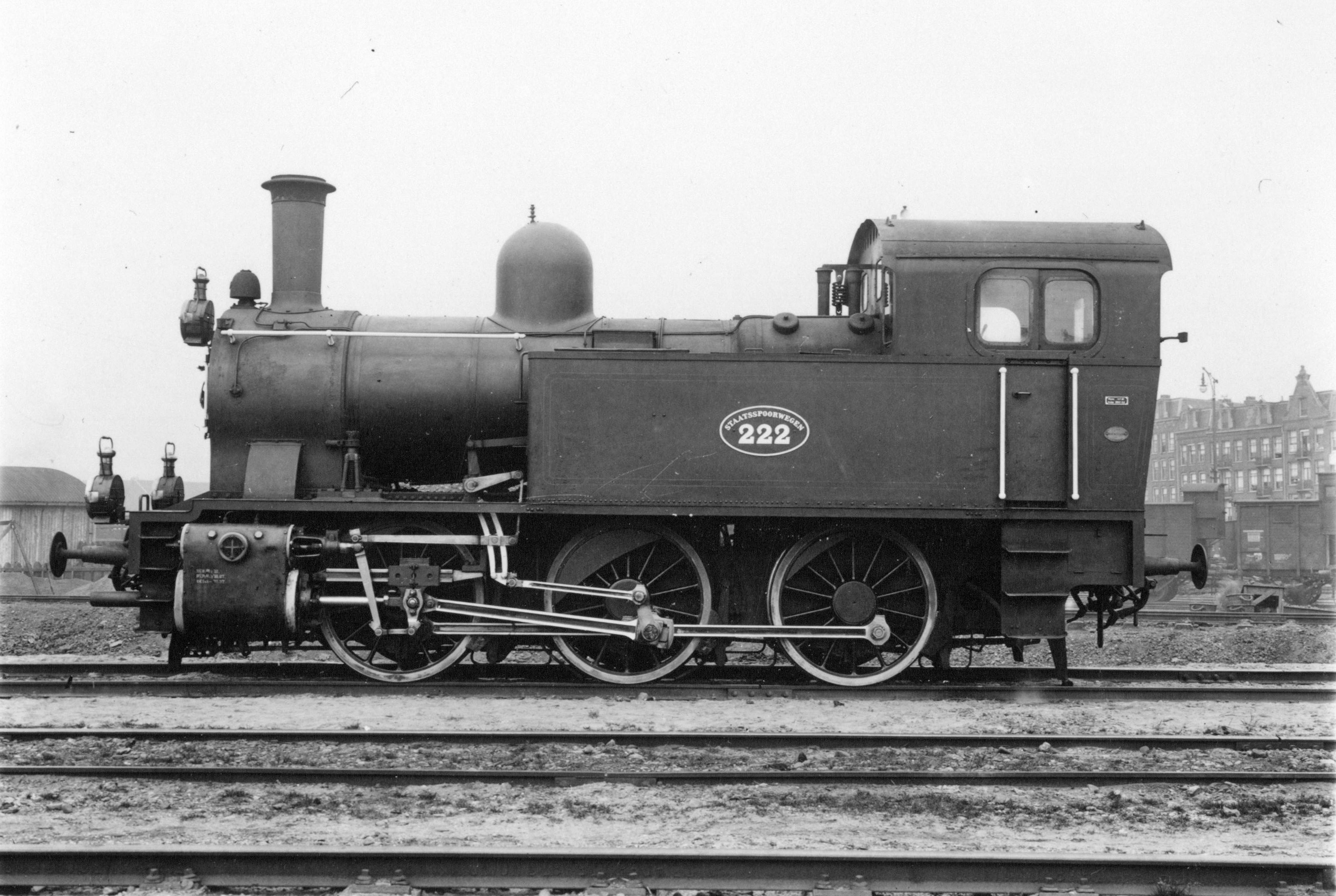
NS 8502 in Amsterdam Weesperpoort.

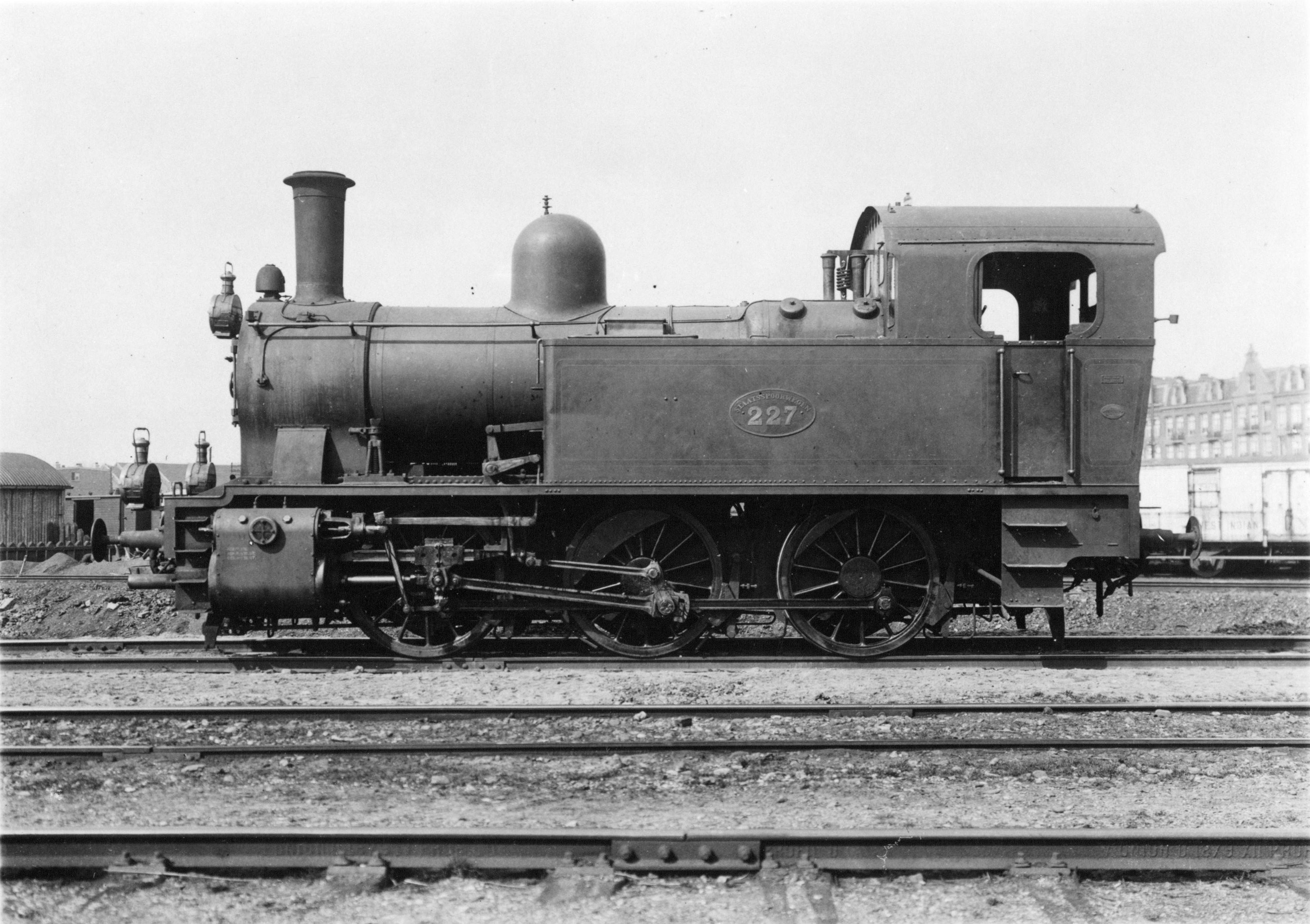
NS 8507 in Amsterdam Weesperpoort (1919)

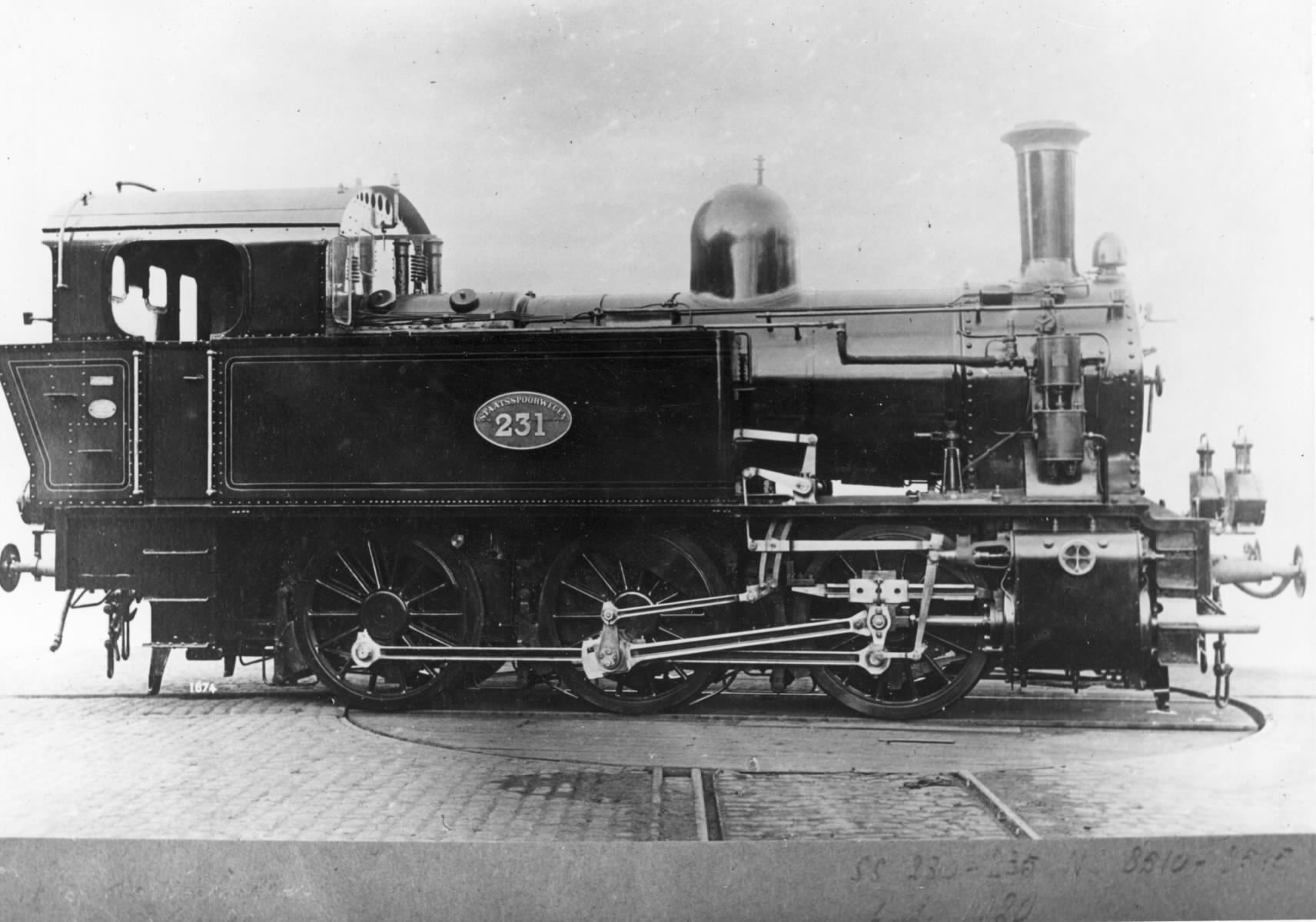
Steam locomotive No. 231 of the series 221-235 of the S.S. later renumbered as NS 8511 (1920)

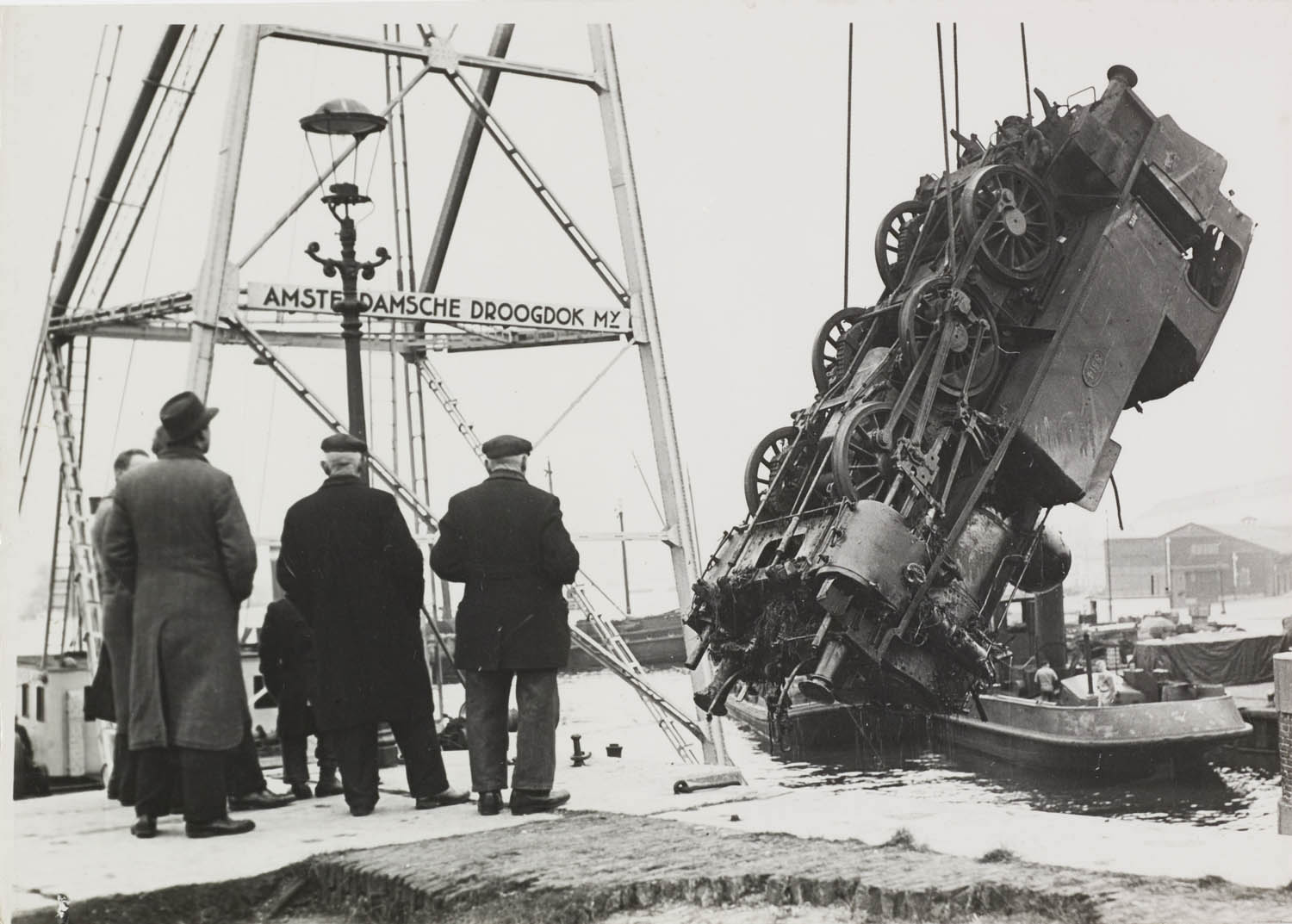
NS 8514 being lifted from the water (1935)

== Sources and references ==
- Waldorp, H. (1981). Onze Nederlandse stoomlocomotieven in woord en beeld. Alkmaar: De Alk. pp. 21–22. ISBN 90-6013-909-7.
- "Het Utrechts archief".
