= Langreo =

Langreo Llangréu (Asturian)
- Municipality
- Llangréu / Langreo
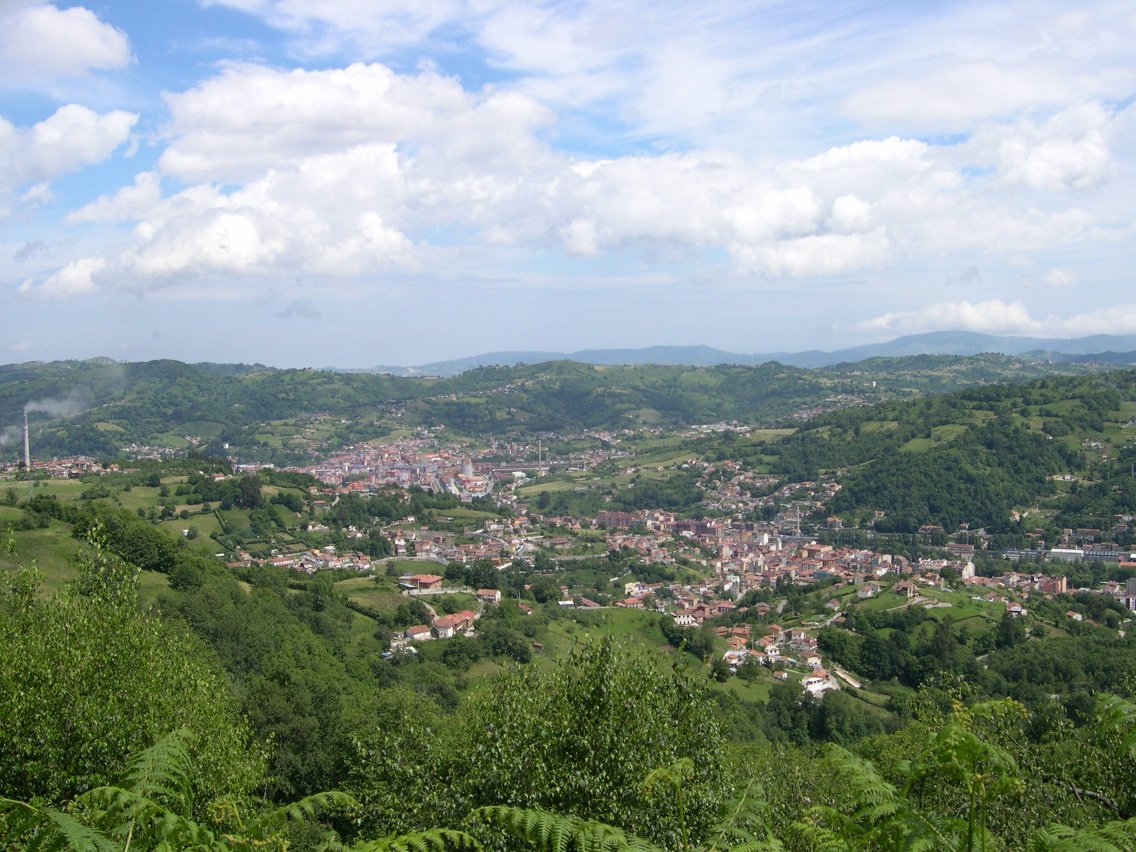
- The town of Langreo at the Nalón Valley

- Flag Coat of arms

- Location of Llangreu

- Location in Spain
- Coordinates: 43°18′N 5°41′W
- Country: Spain
- Autonomous community: Asturias
- Province: Asturias
- Comarca: Nalón

Government
  - Mayor: Roberto García Rodríguez (IU)

Area
  - Total: 83.54 km^{2} (32.25 sq mi)
- Elevation: 1,021 m (3,350 ft)

Population (2024)
  - Total: 38,265
  - Density: 458.0/km^{2} (1,186/sq mi)
- Demonym: Langreanos
- Time zone: UTC+1 (CET)
  - Summer (DST): UTC+2 (CEST)
- Dialing code: 33930(District of La Felguera) 33900(District of Sama) 33920(District of Riaño) 33909(District of Ciaño) 33934(District of Lada)
- Official language(s): Asturian and Spanish
- Website: Official website

Langreo (Spanish pronunciation: [laŋˈɡɾeo]) or Llangréu (Asturian pronunciation: [ʎaŋˈɣɾew], locally [ʎaŋˈɣɾeo]) (Asturian) is a town and municipality in the Principality of Asturias in Spain. With a population of 38,265 as of 2024, it is the 4th-largest municipality of Asturias.

Langreo is located in the centre of Asturias, approximately 20 kilometres (12 miles) south-east of Oviedo. It was an important mining and metallurgical center.

== History ==
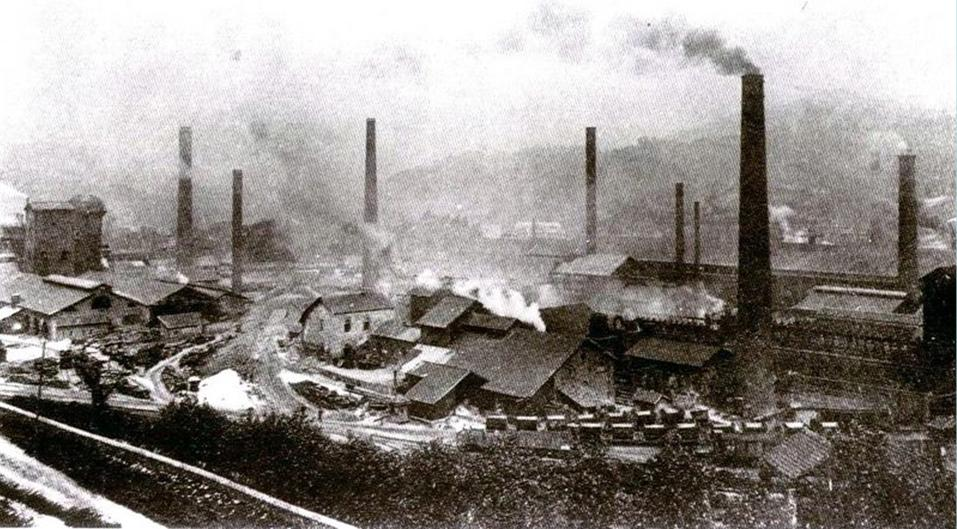
Duro Felguera Iron Company at 1920's

According to a legend Langreo was the place where the Moorish governor Munuza was killed while trying to flee from Asturias at the beginning of the Reconquest. Langreo was settled by the Romans, who built a large Roman bridge that is not conserved today.

In the past, it was one of the most important mining and metallurgical points of Spain since the 18th century, and it was also well known because of workers struggles and its cultural life. The 3rd railway to be built in the Iberian Peninsula was the FC of Langreo. The Factory of La Felguera was one of the most important iron works centers in Spain, and the Langreo mines was well known in whole the country.

Because of the Spanish "Industrial Restructuring", Langreo lost its industrial importance, but today the town hosts Bayer, where 100% of the acetylsalicylic acid of the German enterprise are produced. Langreo also holds the technologies centre Valnalón.

Langreo has historic monuments like the church of San Esteban, the Quintana Tower or the Sanctuary of Carbayu. Also preserves good examples of its industrial heritage and it hosts the Siderurgy Museum Of Asturias within the old Felguera Factory, the Samuño Valley and Railway Mining Museum, and the art gallery Pinacoteca Eduardo Úrculo.

Langreo celebrates fiestas of San Pedro and Santiago, and special gastronomic days: Carnival (February) Cider (April) and Fabada (December).

The largest town is Langreo formed by the most important districts: La Felguera (20,000 inhabitants), Sama (10,000), and Riaño, Ciaño, Lada and Barros, also known as parishes.

== Parishes ==
There are eight parishes (administrative divisions) by population:

- La Felguera
- Sama
- Riaño
- Ciaño
- Lada
- Tuilla
- Barros
- La Venta

== Demographics ==
As of 2024, the foreign-born population is 2,592, equal to 6.8% of the total population. The 5 largest foreign nationalities are Colombians (321), Moroccans (277), Argentinians (165), Portuguese (156) and Venezuelans (152).

Foreign population by country of birth (2024)
Country	Population
Colombia	321
Morocco	277
Argentina	165
Portugal	156
Venezuela	152
Poland	136
Ecuador	126
Paraguay	126
Cuba	120
Romania	109
Brazil	77
Dominican Republic	66
Belgium	65
France	60
Peru	59

Historical population

Year	Pop.	±%
1842	4,229	—
1857	7,823	+85.0%
1877	12,788	+63.5%
1887	14,091	+10.2%
1900	18,751	+33.1%
1910	25,564	+36.3%
1920	34,486	+34.9%
1930	40,224	+16.6%
1940	46,005	+14.4%

Year	Pop.	±%
1950	54,676	+18.8%
1960	66,323	+21.3%
1970	59,465	−10.3%
1981	56,347	−5.2%
1991	51,710	−8.2%
2001	45,731	−11.6%
2011	43,934	−3.9%
2021	38,693	−11.9%

Source: INE

== Politics ==
Local elections
Party/List	1979	1983	1987	1991	1995	1999	2003	2007	2011	2015	2019
FSA-PSOE	10	14	10	11	8	9	8	10	7	6	9
PCE / IU-BA	7	6	7	9	10	11	7	5	4	6	
Somos										5	
CD / AP / PP	2	5	4	4	7	5	6	6	4	3	2
C’s										1	2
FAC									4		
FDLI									2		
UCD / CDS	6	0	4	1							
Unidas (Somos+IU)											8
Total	25	25	25	25	25	25	21	21	21	21	21

== Notable people ==
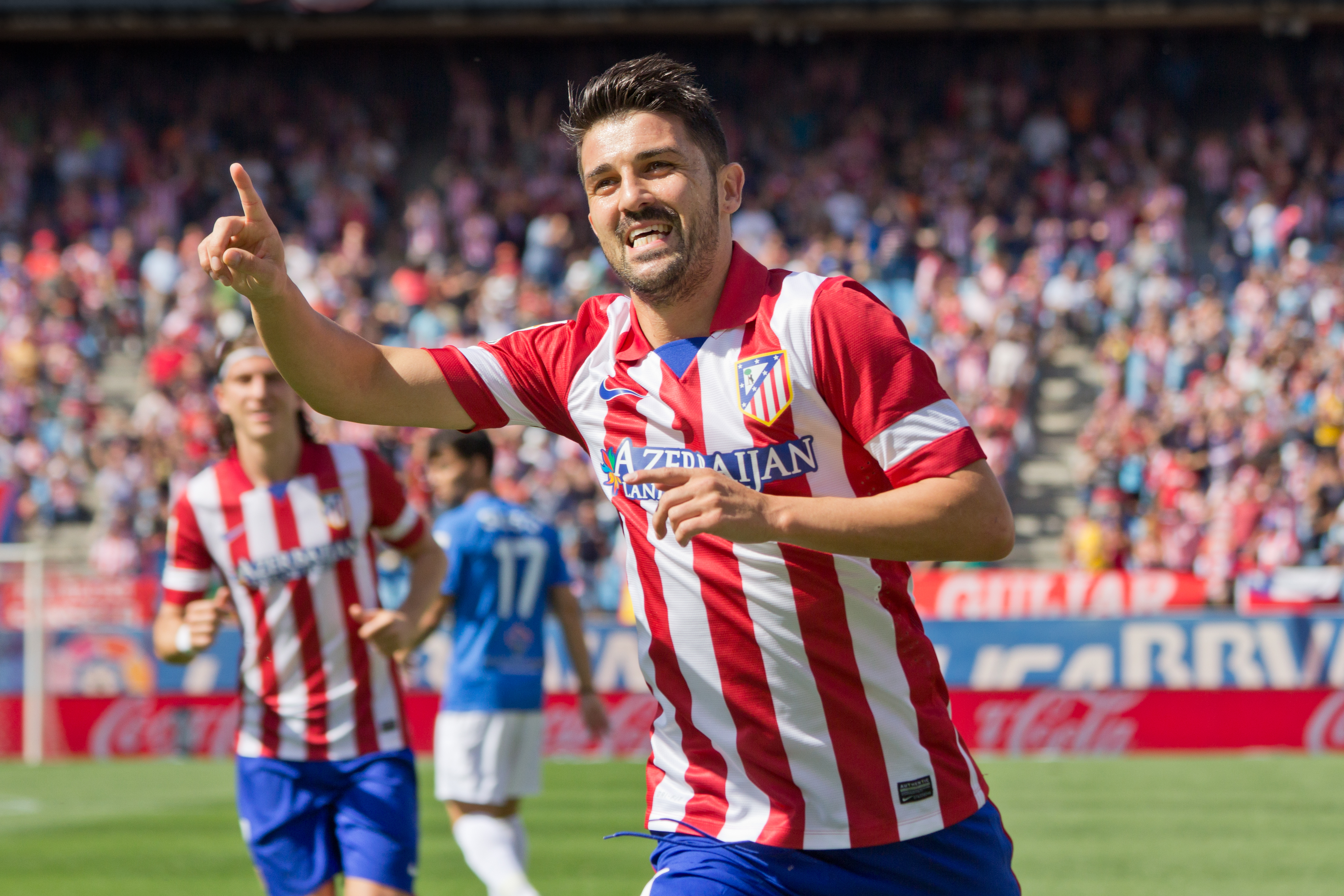
David Villa

- David Villa, footballer
- Manuel Mejuto González, football referee
- Pedro Duro, businessman
- Aurelius of Asturias, King of Asturias
- Gaspar García Laviana, soldier
- Mario Cotelo, footballer
- Alberto Coto García, mental calculator
- Dámaso Alonso, poet
- Narciso Ibáñez Menta, actor
- Jesús Fernández Duro, sportman
- María Neira, WHO doctor
- Carlos Álvarez-Nóvoa, actor

== Gallery ==
Orthophotomap of Langreo

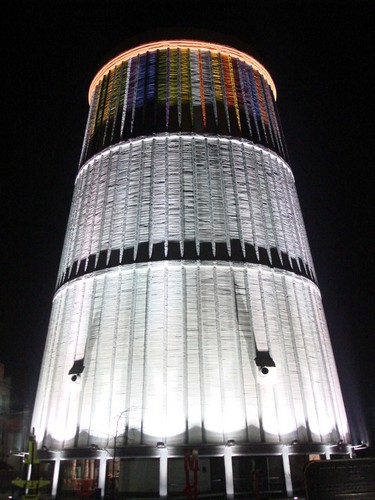
Museum of the Siderurgy of Asturias

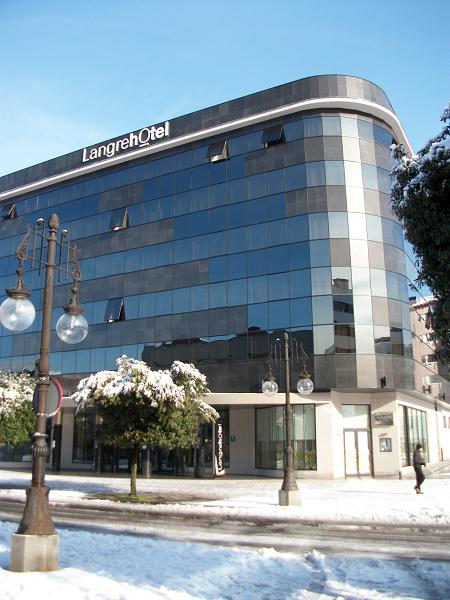
Langreohotel Hotel

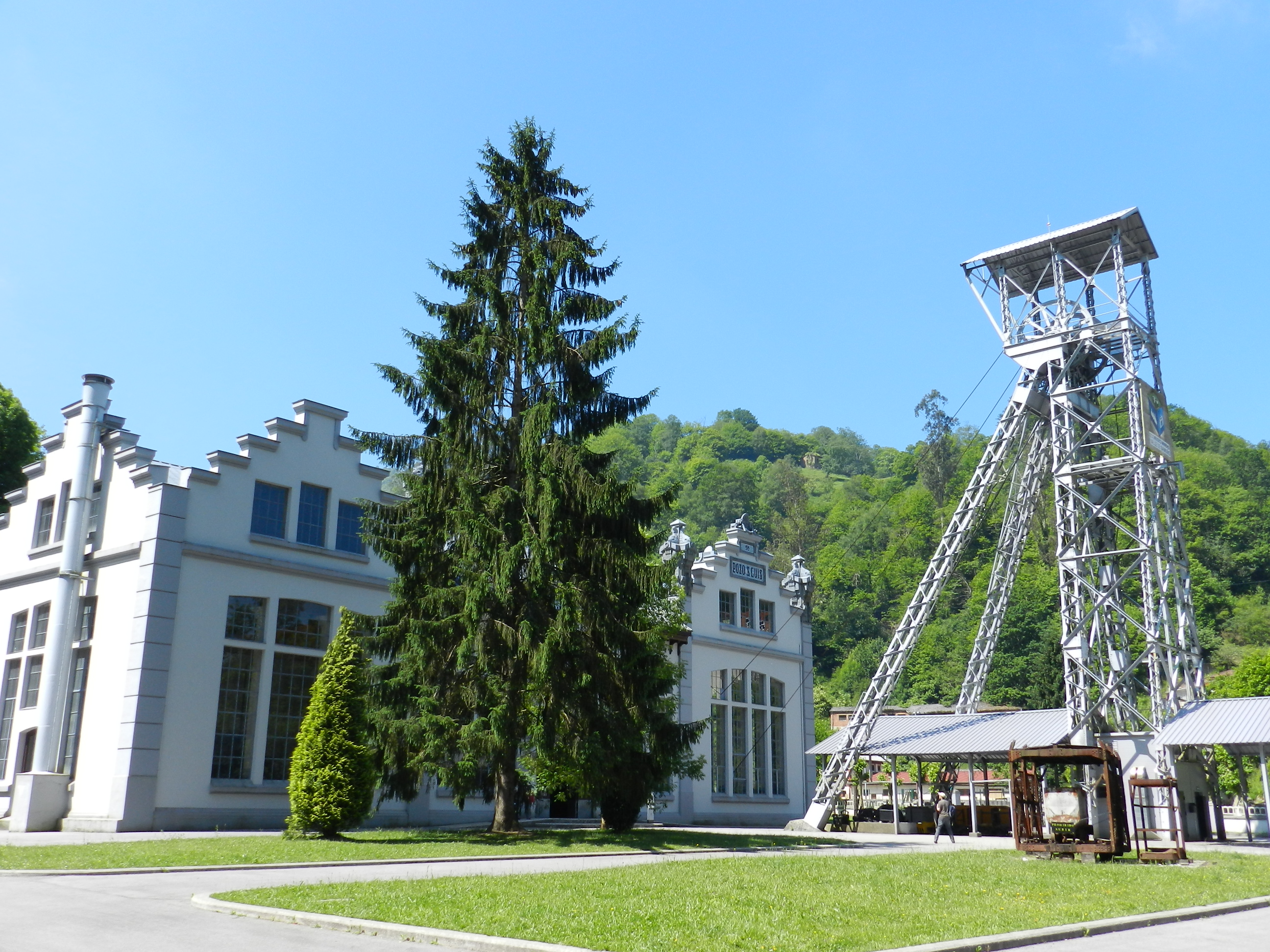
Samuño Mining and Railway Museum

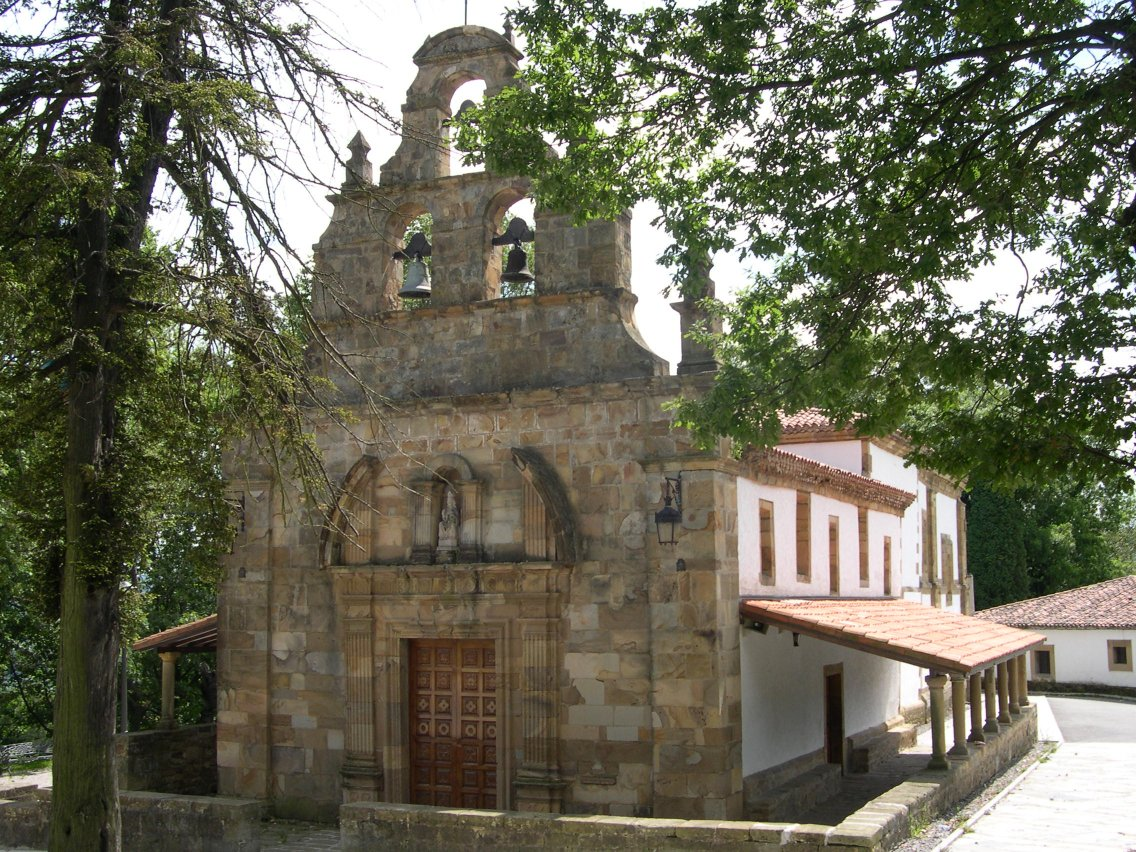
Catholic Sanctuary of El Carbayu

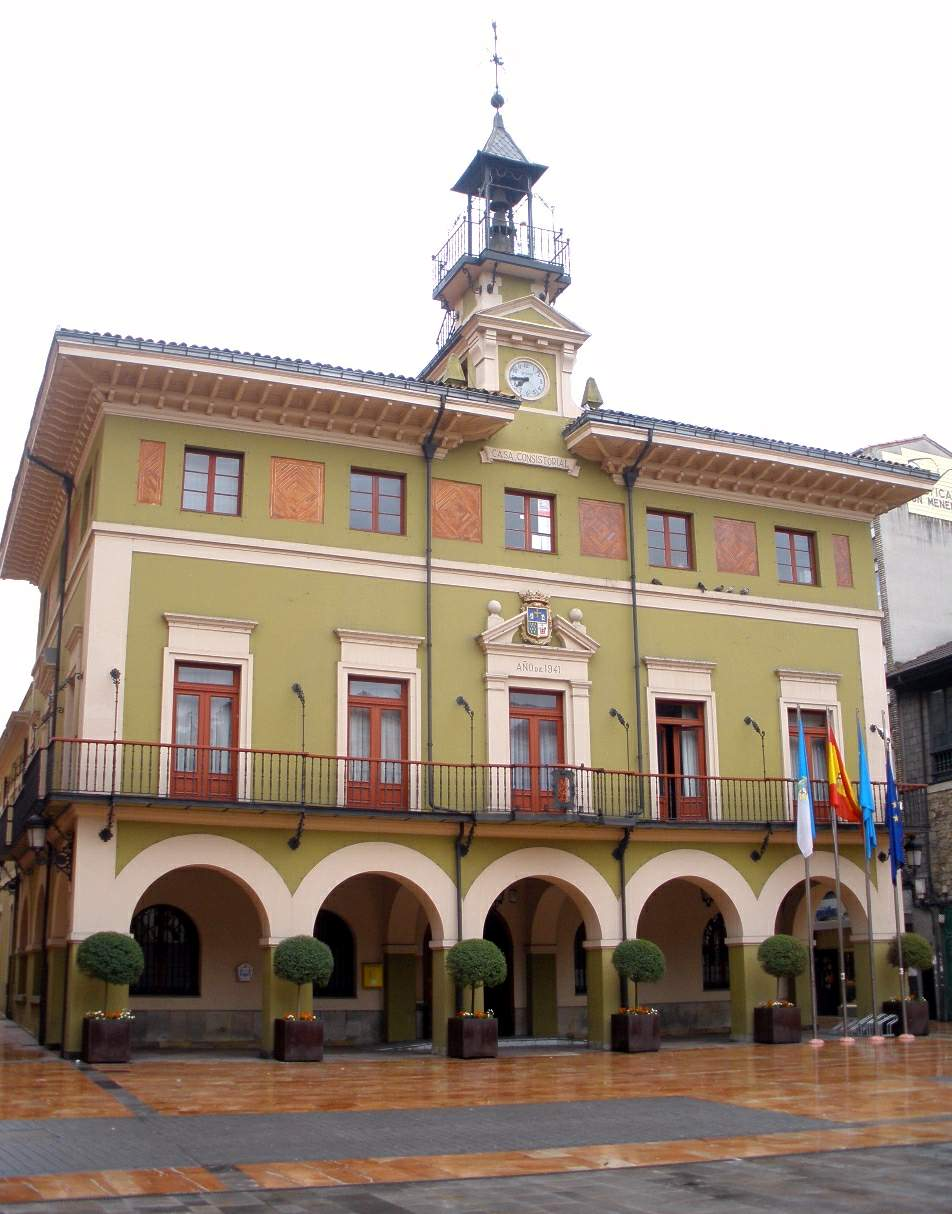
Town hall

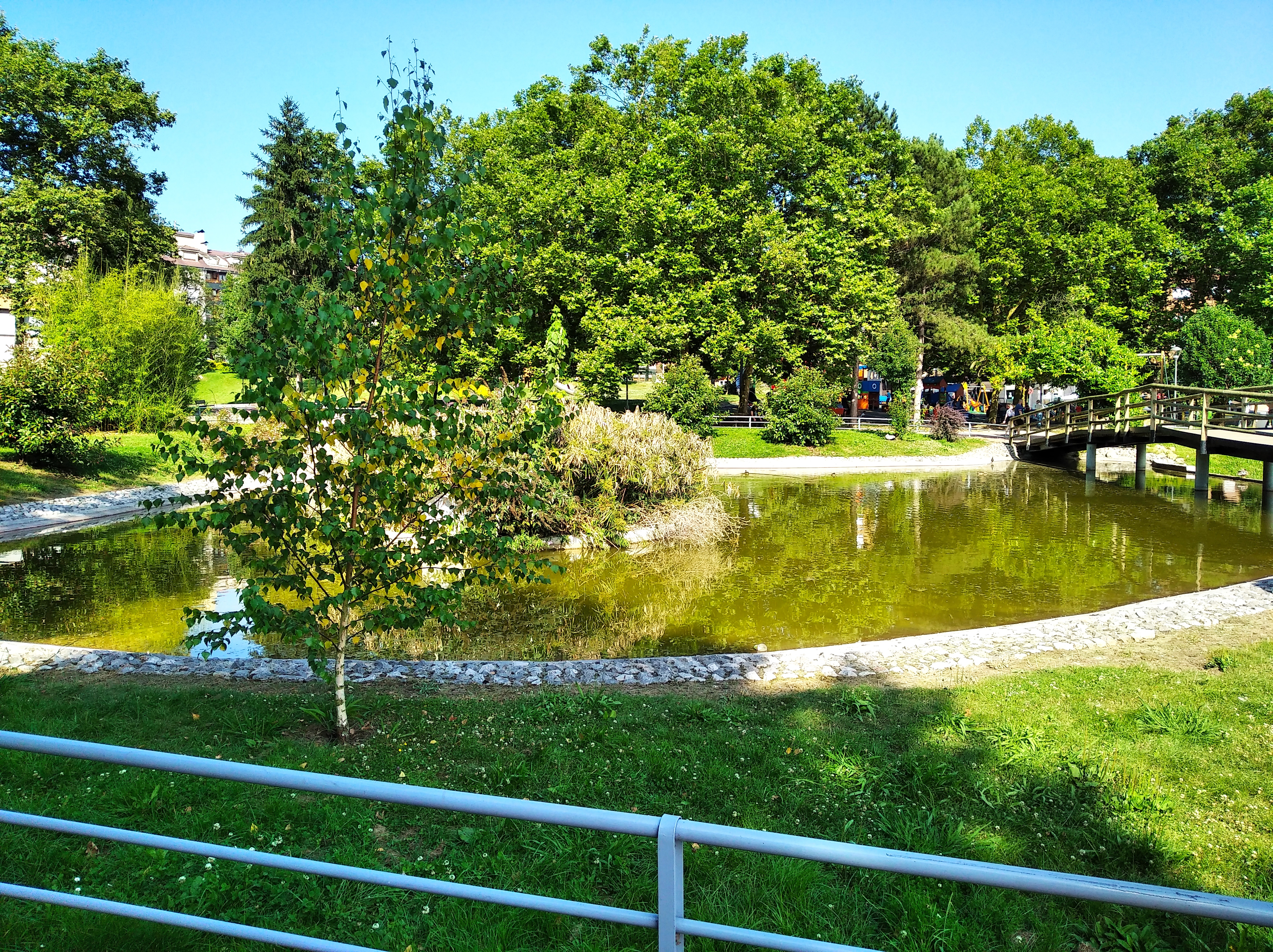
García Lago public park

== See also ==
- List of municipalities in Asturias
