= Barros, Asturias =

Barros (Langreo)
- Parish
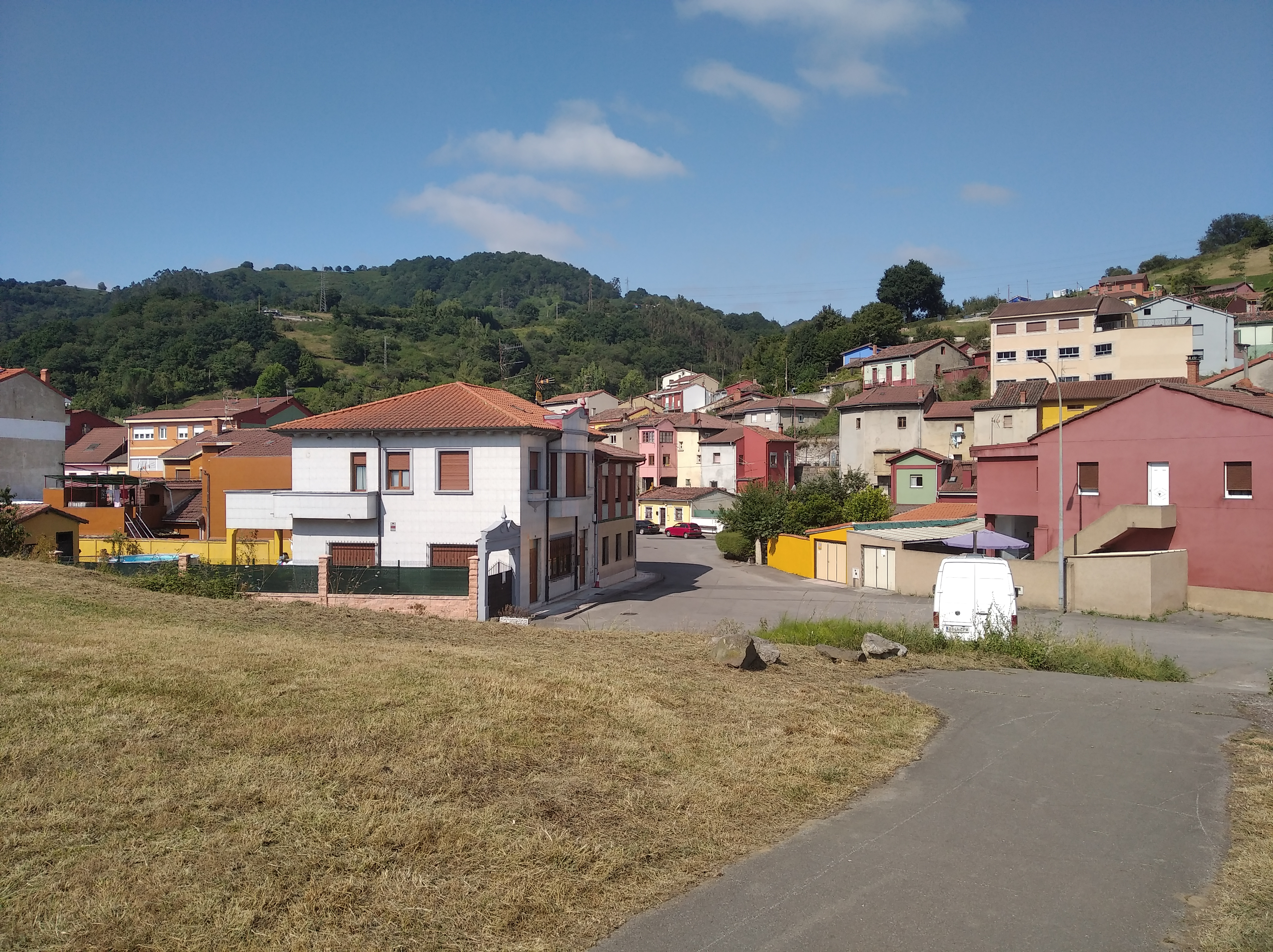
- Barros, Asturias

- Location within Spain
- Country: Spain
- Autonomous community: Asturias
- Province: Asturias
- Municipality: Langreo

Barros is one of eight parishes (administrative divisions) in the Asturian city of Langreo, a municipality within the province and autonomous community of Asturias, in northern Spain and a parish of the same name. It is located between the districts of Riaño and La Felguera.

== General information ==
The expansion of the city of Barros is due to the industries of La Felguera and the exploitation of coal, and the loss of population after the re-conversion of the mining basins to industrial industries, with a population of less than 800 today. The main street of Barros is directly connected to Pablo Picasso Street in the La Felguera area.

Before the arrival of large-scale industry in Langreo, Barros had been a town inhabited since the Middle Ages and devoted to agriculture and livestock, becoming one of the centers with the highest population concentration in the council. This is confirmed by various documents, including the ceding of Alfonso VII of Alfoz de Barros to the bishopric. There are also references to the population in the dictionary of Pascual Madoz. Barros came to have three sumptuous palaces on its site: Riano, Llanes Campomanes and La Cortina. The latter has been greatly altered by 19th-century reforms, losing its tower in 1839. Antonio de Arguelles y Valdés, who was a councillor of Castile and prosecutor of the Council of the Indies in the 17th century, lived in this house. In addition to the health clinic, Barros is home to a centre for people with neurological disabilities, which is awaiting its opening. It has the Renfe station of the Cercanías Asturias network, the C-2 line, and bus lines that connect Oviedo, Avilés, Gijón and the rest of the Nalón Valley. Barros still has an old abandoned mining operation, the Pozo Barros, and within its borders is the old Nitrastor factory. The inhabitants of the parish are the Buzaricos and celebrate their festivals in honour of the Immaculate Conception at the end of August. These festivals are organized by the local festival association.

== Villages ==
- El Barreru
- El Casal
- Faeo
- La Llamiella
- La Peña
- Les Peñes
- La Talamera
- Les Viesques
- La venta l'aire
- El Pozu
- L'acebal
- Pedrazos
- El Campanal
- La Traba
- El Pevidal
- Caecía
- El Puente Llago

== Population ==
Its population is about 1,000 inhabitants, and covers an area of 2.63 km².

== Feasts ==
Barros celebrates its feast in honor of the Immaculate Conception in August.

== Facilities ==
In Barros, the Stephen Hawking Neurological Disability Center is being completed. Barros has a train stop for the Cercanías Asturias RENFE, from the C-2 line, and bus lines that connect to Oviedo, Avilés, Gijón and the rest of the Nalón Valley. Its inhabitants are called pozaricos. Economic development is by means of the valley and La Felguera coal extraction industries. In Barros there is still an old mine, el Pozo Barros, and its limits is the old Nitrastur Factory.
