= Tuilla =

Tiuya / Tuilla Tiuya (Asturian)
- Parish
- Location in Spain
- Coordinates: 43°19′45″N 5°38′36″W
- Country: Spain
- Autonomous community: Asturias
- Province: Asturias
- Comarca: Nalón
- Municipality: Langreo

Population (2009)
  - Total: 1,491
- Postal code: 33935
- Official language(s): Spanish

Tuilla (Spanish) or Tiuya (Asturian) is a small parish and former mining village in the municipality of Langreo, Asturias, North Spain. It is located to the southeast of the center of the city of Oviedo, near La Felguera-Langreo, and had a population of 1,491 in 2009. In the past (19th century and part of the 20th century) Tuilla was a significant in the mining industry, with the coal mines of El Terrerón, Mosquitera and La Braña.

The village is well known for its football club, CD Tuilla, and for being the place of birth of the international footballer David Villa and where the priest soldier Gaspar García Laviana was moved during his childhood.
