= Museum of the Siderurgy =

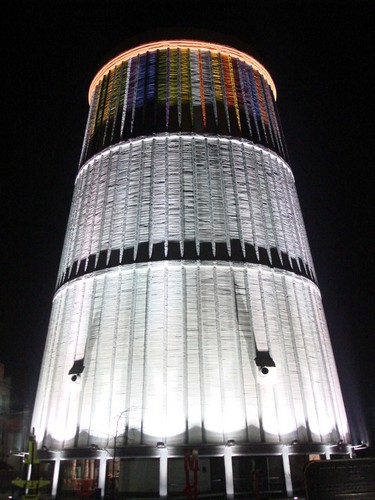
- The Museum is into a Cooling Tower

- Location within Asturias
- Established: September 2006
- Location: Principality of Asturias
- Coordinates: 43.309004°N 5.687874°W
- Type: Industrial Revolution, Industrial Heritage
- Website: Official website

The Museum of the Siderurgy of Asturias (in Spanish Museo de la Siderurgia de Asturias), is a museum located in La Felguera, in the Principality of Asturias, northern Spain. It is also known as the MUSI.

== History ==
The museum is located inside of a former tower of refrigeration of the Felguera Factory. At the mid 19th century, Pedro Duro established here one of the most modern metallurgical factories of Spain, that would manage to be one of the most important of the country. It was placed in the heart of the Mining Asturian Zone, close to coal and to the Nalón River. The factory disappeared in 1984 but there remain some buildings, inner the Technological Center Valnalón.

== The museum ==
The museum was inaugurated in 2006 into the ancient chimney of refrigeration, and it consists of three floors. At the first (underground) there is a space dedicated to Bayer, that produces in the zone the acetylsalicylic acid. At the second floor there are an audio-visual room, a model of the former factory and the coffee, and at the last floor it tells the history of the siderurgy in Asturias (with Ensidesa foundation in Avilés and Uninsa in Gijón in 1950, today ArcelorMittal) specially the siderurgy of La Felguera. The museum will grow by buildings from the 19th and 20th centuries that are behind the refrigerantion tower. The museum is completed by urban routes by La Felguera to show the industrial heritage.
