= Sanctuary of Carbayu =

Santuario del Carbayu
- Santuario del Carbayu (Spanish)
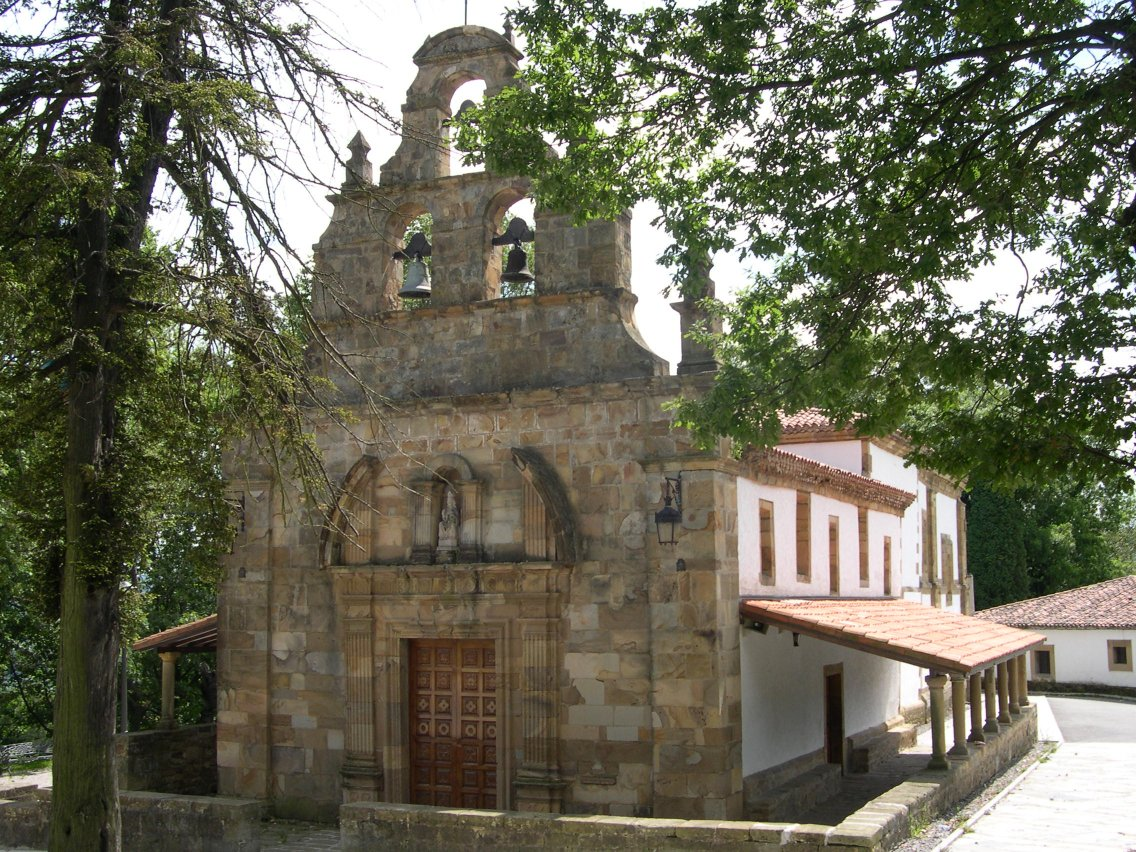

- Location within Spain
- 43.281247°N 5.687208°W
- Location: Langreo, Spain

Spanish Cultural Heritage
- Official name: Santuario del Carbayu
- Type: Non-movable
- Criteria: Monument
- Designated: 1992
- Reference no.: RI-51-0007247

Santuario del Carbayu is a church in Asturias, Spain. The present Baroque-style church was built in the 18th century to replace an earlier romanesque temple. It was declared Bien de Interés Cultural (Cultural Interesting Point) in 1992.

According to a legend, the Virgin appeared on an Oak (Carbayu in Asturian language). The figure of the Virgin Mary is situated on the trunk of an Oak in the baroque altarpiece.
