= Pinacoteca Eduardo Úrculo =

Art museum in La Felguera, Asturias, Spain

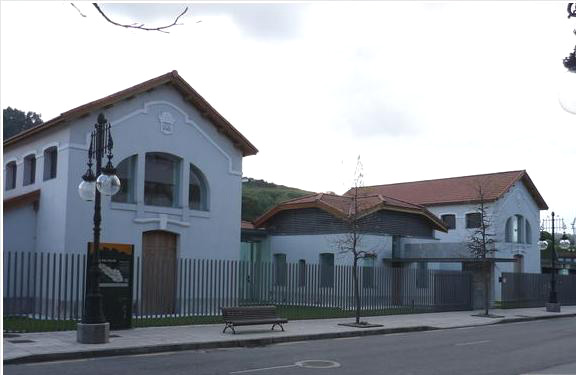
- Established: 27 April 2007
- Location: Calle La Union, 31, La Felguera, Langreo, 33900, Asturias, Spain
- Coordinates: 43.301°N 5.685°W

The Pinacoteca Eduardo Úrculo is an arts center and municipal art gallery located on Calle La Union in La Felguera, Langreo, Asturias, Spain specializing in the period of the Spanish Civil War (1936–1939). It opened on 27 April 2007 and was formed by the Langreo City Council with donations from the Cultural Society La Carbonera. Named after the Basque painter and sculptor Eduardo Úrculo (Santurtzi, 1938 — Madrid, 2003), who specialized in portraying luggage, the gentleman's hat, and the female bottom, the museum honors his artistic and personal relationship with Langreo.

== Exhibitions ==
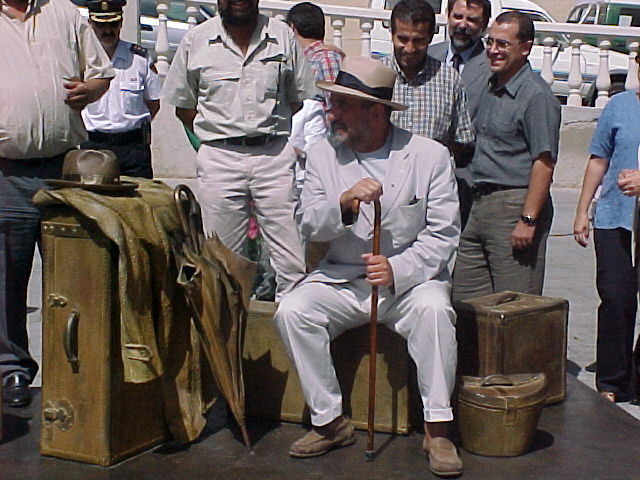
Eduardo Úrculo with one of his works in Fuerteventura.

The gallery displays a permanent collection as well as others that are temporary or rotating. The rotating collections are supplemented with piece created by young arts whose worked originated from the National Contest of Visual Arts. Thirty-one works come from the municipal library.

Exhibitions consist of about one hundred pieces, mostly by Asturian artists, though some are Spanish. Featured are the artists Zuco, Úrculo himself, Beltrán, Lombardía, Rey Fueyo, Vicente Iglesias, Xulián Fueyo, and Gil Morán, as well as prominent contemporary Asturian artists such as Antonio Suárez, Bartolomé Sanjurjo, Herminio, Fega, Pelayo Ortega, Miguel Galano, Melquíades Álvarez, Mojardín, Vicente Pastor, Kely, Lisardo, and Maojo. Seventy paintings were acquired by Langreo during its XIII Biennial of Painting.

== Facility ==
The industrial buildings that house the center were constructed in 1919 by the municipal architects Francisco Casariego and Enrique Rodríguez Bustelo. Restored between 2005 and 2006 by Jovino Martinez Sierra, the arts center consists of four buildings linked by glazed corridors, as well as a garden. It is in the area of the Nalon River bridge and can be accessed via the AS-17.

== Services ==
Educational workshops are available for children. Additionally, the center offers courses, seminars, lectures, screenings, and guided tours.

Open six days per week, including holidays, the facility is closed on Tuesdays.
