= La Venta, Asturias =

La Venta (Langreo)
- Parish
- Interactive map of La Venta (Langreo)
- Country: Spain
- Autonomous community: Asturias
- Province: Asturias
- Municipality: Langreo

Population
  - Total: 300

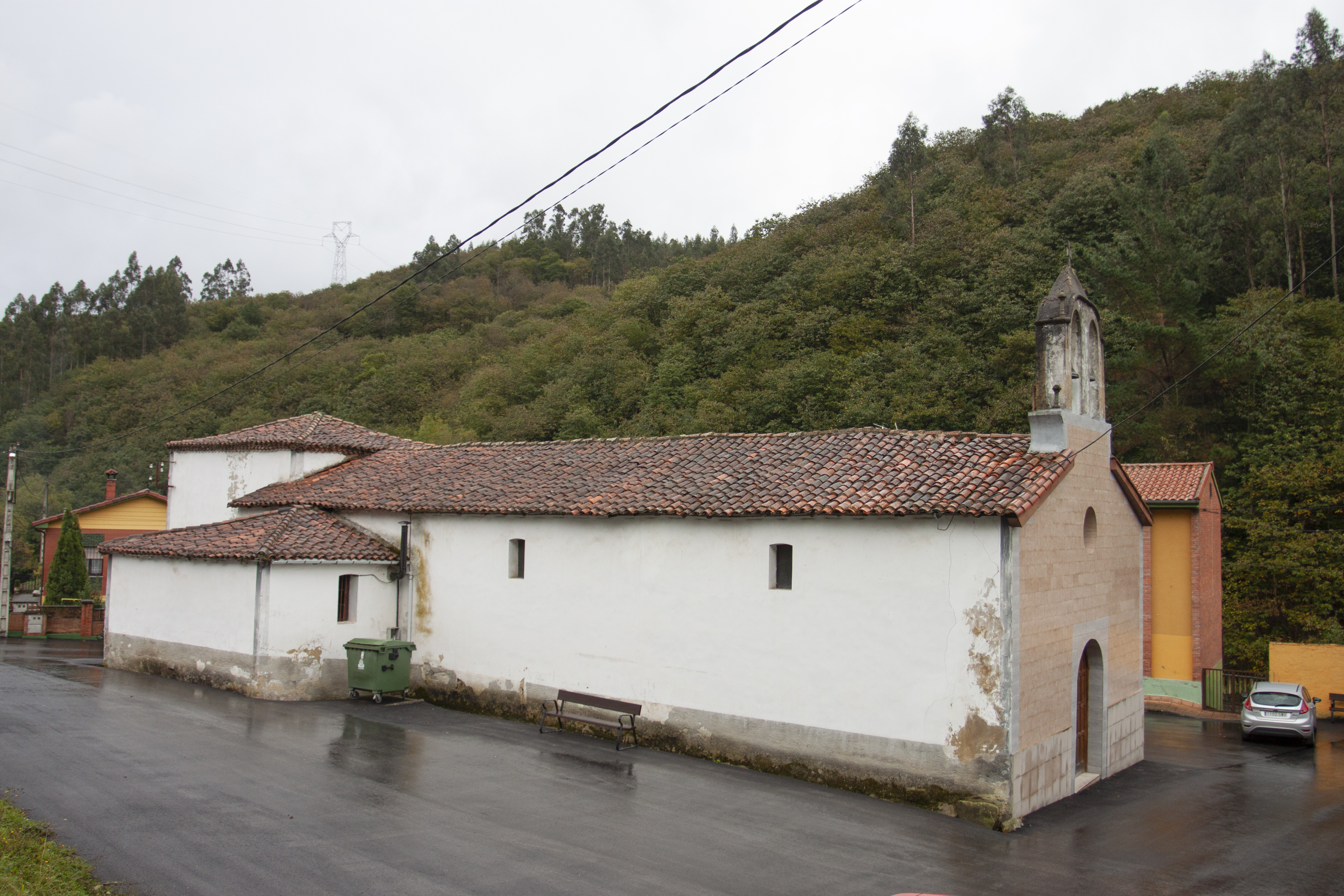
La Venta (Langreo, Asturias)

La Venta is one of eight parishes (administrative divisions) in the Asturian municipality of Langreo, within the province and autonomous community of Asturias, in northern Spain.

The most important villages are El Carmen and La Venta. El Carmen hosts an ancient chapel dedicated to the Virgin of Carmen that was an important centre of peregrination at the Nalon Valley.

La Venta has rural landscapes and a population of 300 inhabitants.
