= Gaspar García Laviana =

Spanish Catholic priest and soldier (1941–1978)

Gaspar Garcia Laviana

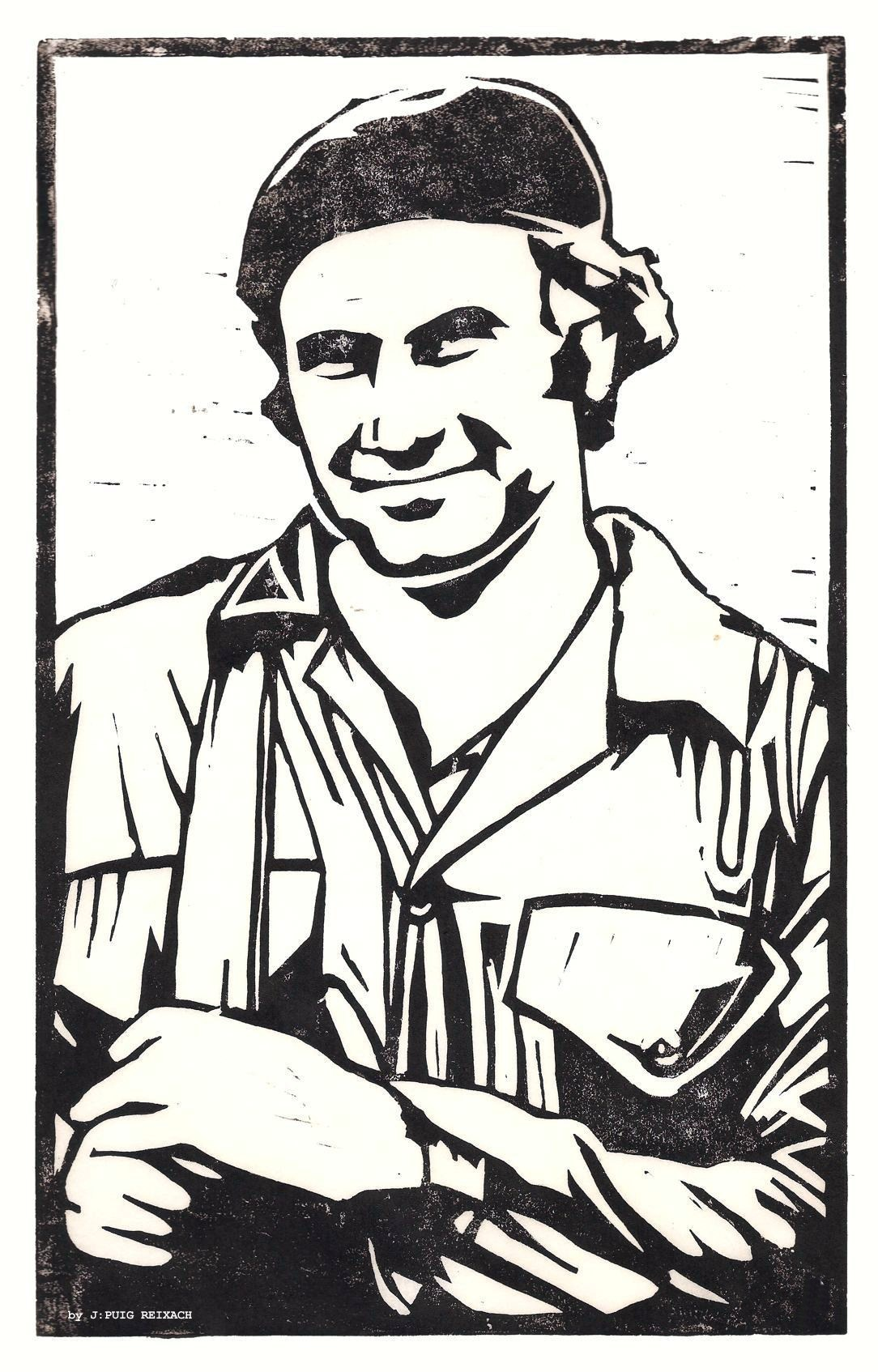
Gaspar García Laviana (linocut)

Gaspar García Laviana (November 8, 1941 – December 11, 1978) was a Spanish Catholic priest who took up arms to fight as a soldier in Nicaragua with the Sandinista National Liberation Front (FSLN) in 1977.

== Early life ==
García Laviana was born in 1941 in Les Roces, San Martin del Rey Aurelio, Principality of Asturias (Spain), moving during his childhood to Tuilla, Langreo. He was ordained a priest of the Missionaries of the Sacred Heart (MSC) in 1966. Thereafter, he took charge of a church in Logroño for three years, working at the same time as a carpenter.

== Missionary in Nicaragua ==
In 1969, García Laviana arrived in Nicaragua as a missionary priest. Through his missionary work with Pedro Regalado in the parishes of San Juan del Sur and Tola in the department of Rivas, García Laviana worked closely with the Nicaraguan peasants and was intimately aware of the many hardships they faced. He joined other progressive Christians in concientización (or awareness raising) in poor rural communities around the country.

== Activism against social injustice ==
García Laviana happened to arrive in a country where a revolution was in the making. His work as a missionary inevitably led him to side with the poor and join the revolutionary process. His loud complaints about the neglect of the poor, including sit-ins in government offices, caught the attention of Anastasio Somoza's administration. García Laviana was also an outspoken critic of the brothels located in his parish, many operating with underage girls.

== Exile in Costa Rica and involvement in the revolution ==
When he exposed this scandal on the radio, Somoza's National Guard tried on two occasions to assassinate him. He fled to Costa Rica where he met exiled members of the Sandinista National Liberation Front (FSLN). He agreed with them that the overthrow of Somoza was a moral—even religious—necessity. After agonizing soul-searching, and deep reading in church doctrine, he decided that taking up arms to fight evil did not violate his Christian principles. His decision was broadcast in two secretly distributed public letters which made clear that, with a heavy heart, he felt armed struggle was his Christian duty as a priest in solidarity with the oppressed. Trained in explosives in Cuba, he returned to Central America and joined the "'Benjamín Zeledón' Southern Front" in the Sandinista guerrilla war against Somoza. His unit was betrayed by a traitor and ambushed on a farm called "El Infierno" along the Costa Rican border. García Laviana rose up to fire when he should have stayed down; he was killed instantly. He never lived to see the triumph of the insurrection the following July.

== Legacy ==
A closet poet, García Laviana expressed his outrage at the poverty and neglect of Nicaraguan peasants, society, as well as his own mixed emotions as he took up arms, in many secretly circulated poems. After the triumph of the insurrection, in 1979, they were published as a collection called Songs of Love and War; this was the first book published by the Sandinista government's Ministry of Culture, headed by another poet and priest, Ernesto Cardenal. Biographies include Gaspar vive by Fr. Manuel Rodriguez Garcia, and ¡Gaspar! A Spanish Poet/Priest in the Nicaraguan Revolution by David Gullette, which contains a bilingual collection of his most important poetry.

Laviana was greatly influenced by the spirit of liberation theology, which focused on a "preferential option for the poor", as declared at the Latin American Bishops' conferences in Medellín and Cuernavaca.

Daniel Ortega, president of Nicaragua, acknowledged the importance of García Laviana's participation in the revolutionary struggle. García Laviana's involvement in the Nicaraguan Revolution encouraged Catholics to support the FSLN by providing the revolutionary movement with a sense of moral legitimacy. Many of his concerns became priorities for the Sandinistas when they assumed power. The revolutionary government took up health care as a major priority, implemented agrarian reform initiatives that redistributed land back to many peasants individually and in cooperatives, made education through the fourth grade free and universal, and denounced prostitution.

== See also ==
- The Catholic Church and the Nicaraguan Revolution
