= San Pedro (La Felguera) =

Coordinates: 43.3071°N 5.6933°W

Iglesia de San Pedro (La Felguera)
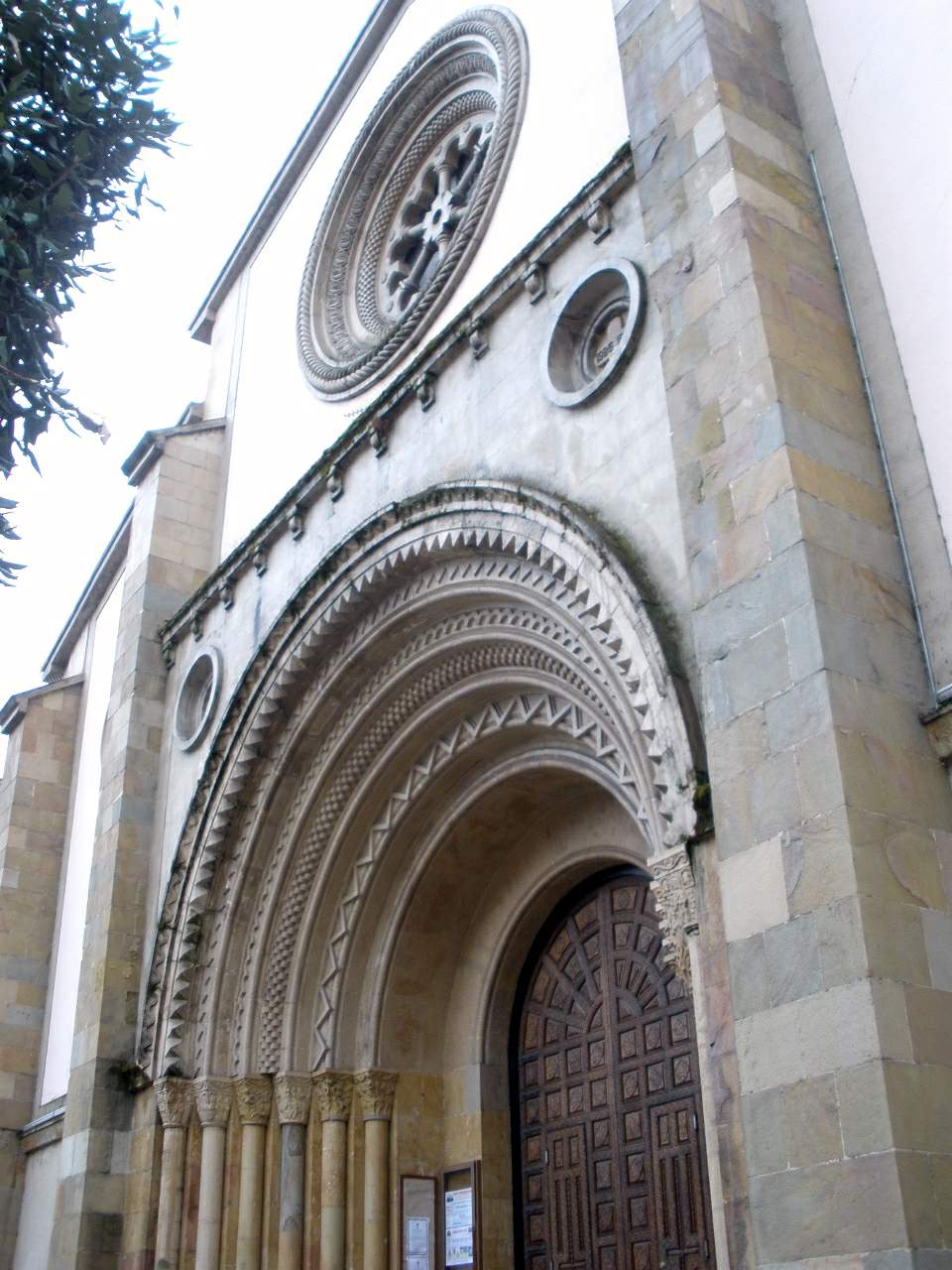
- Iglesia de San Pedro (La Felguera)
- Location: Asturias, Spain

History
- Former name: Santa Eulalia
- Founded: 1604
- Dedication: San Pedro
- Consecrated: 1954

Architecture
- Architect: Francisco Zuvillaga
- Architectural type: Chapel
- Style: Neo-Romanesque
- Completed: 1954

Iglesia de San Pedro is a church in La Felguera, Asturias, Spain. Formally opened in 1954, a small chapel was located on the site from 1604. In the 1880s work began on the new church but was rebuilt in the 1940s after the Spanish Civil War.
