= Ferrocarril de Langreo =

Spanish railway company

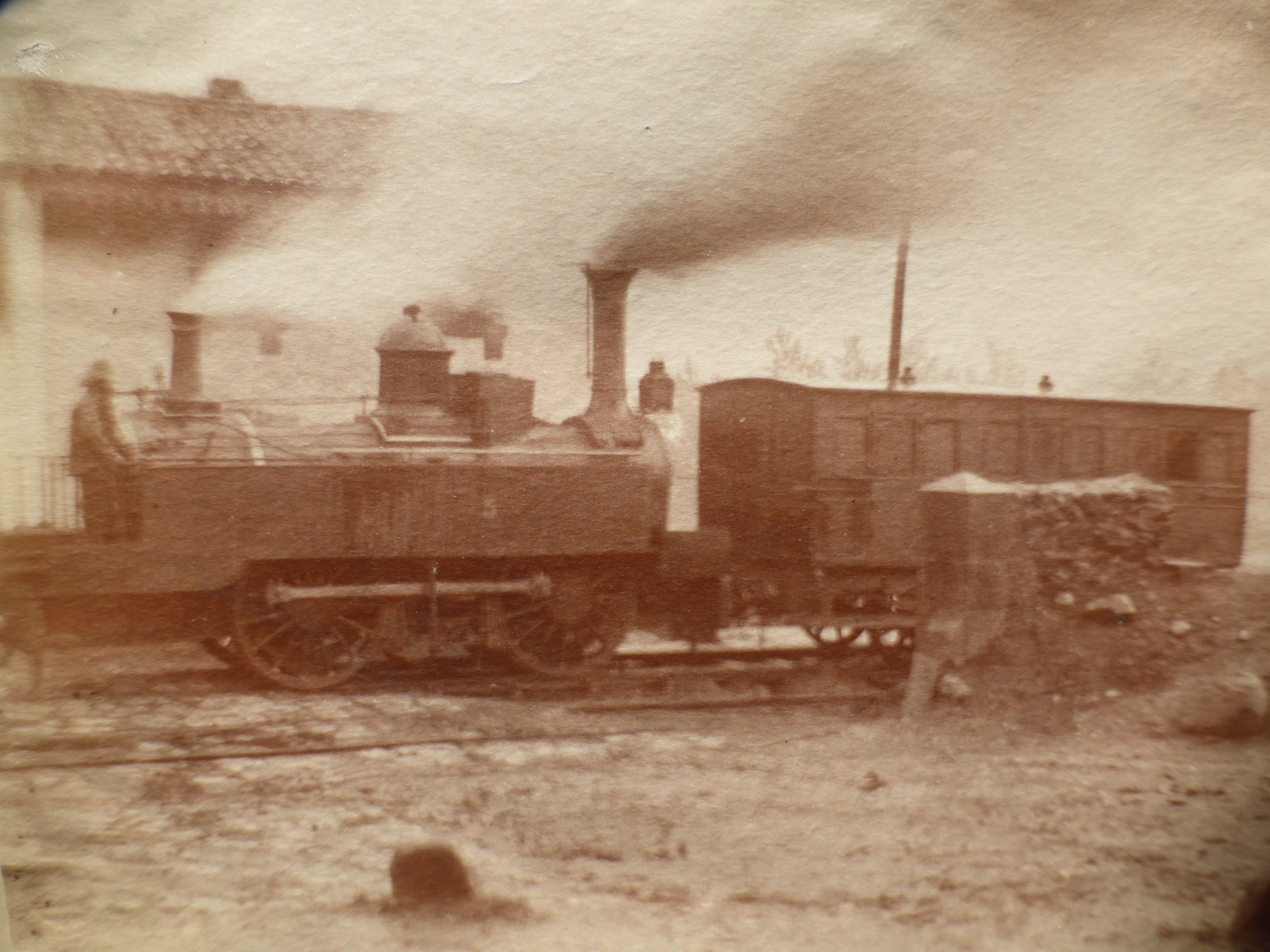
Steam locomotive number 3 of the Langreo Railway. Built in 1852. Photographed in 1887.

Ferrocarril de Langreo or FC de Langreo (FCL) was a Spanish railway company which operated a 1,435 mm (4 ft 8 1/2 in) standard gauge line, in the Autonomous Community of Asturias, in northern Spain. It was the third train line constructed in Spain and was built during the 1850s.

== History ==
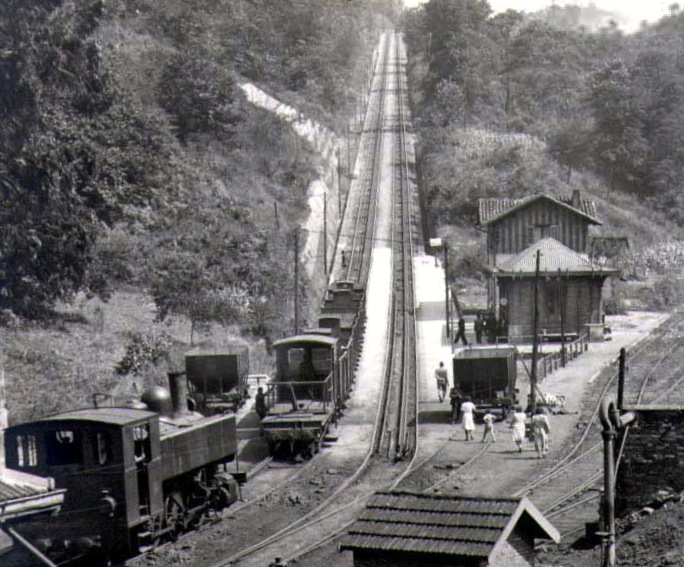
View of the inclined plane of San Pedro and the old station of Florida

The private 50 km (31 mi) railway focused on moving coal and iron ore from the mines of Laviana and Langreo and the factory of La Felguera to Gijón. It was the only non-urban Spanish railway built to near-standard gauge, which often led it to look for second-hand rolling stock, mainly from the United States. This included the purchase of:

- Five 2-8-0 steam locomotives in 1959 from the Alaska Railroad ARR 401 402 404 405 406 which kept their former numbers
- Talgo passenger coach sets built for the New York, New Haven and Hartford Railroad in 1964, the rolling stock of the John Quincy Adams (train).
- Four ALCO RS-3 diesel electric units in 1964, from the Terminal Railroad Association of St. Louis. A fifth unit, numbered 1604, was purchased in 1971 from the Burlington Northern Railroad, a piece of surplus Great Northern Railway stock from the 1970 merger that formed the Burlington Northern.

In 1973, the FC de Langreo was absorbed by FEVE, which rebuilt the Gijón–Laviana line to 1,000 mm (3 ft 3 3/8 in) metre gauge in 1983.

== See also ==
- FEVE
- History of rail transport in Spain
- Renfe
- Transportation in Spain
