= Riañu =

Riaño (Langreo)
- Parish
- Location within Spain
- Country: Spain
- Autonomous community: Asturias
- Province: Asturias
- Municipality: Langreo

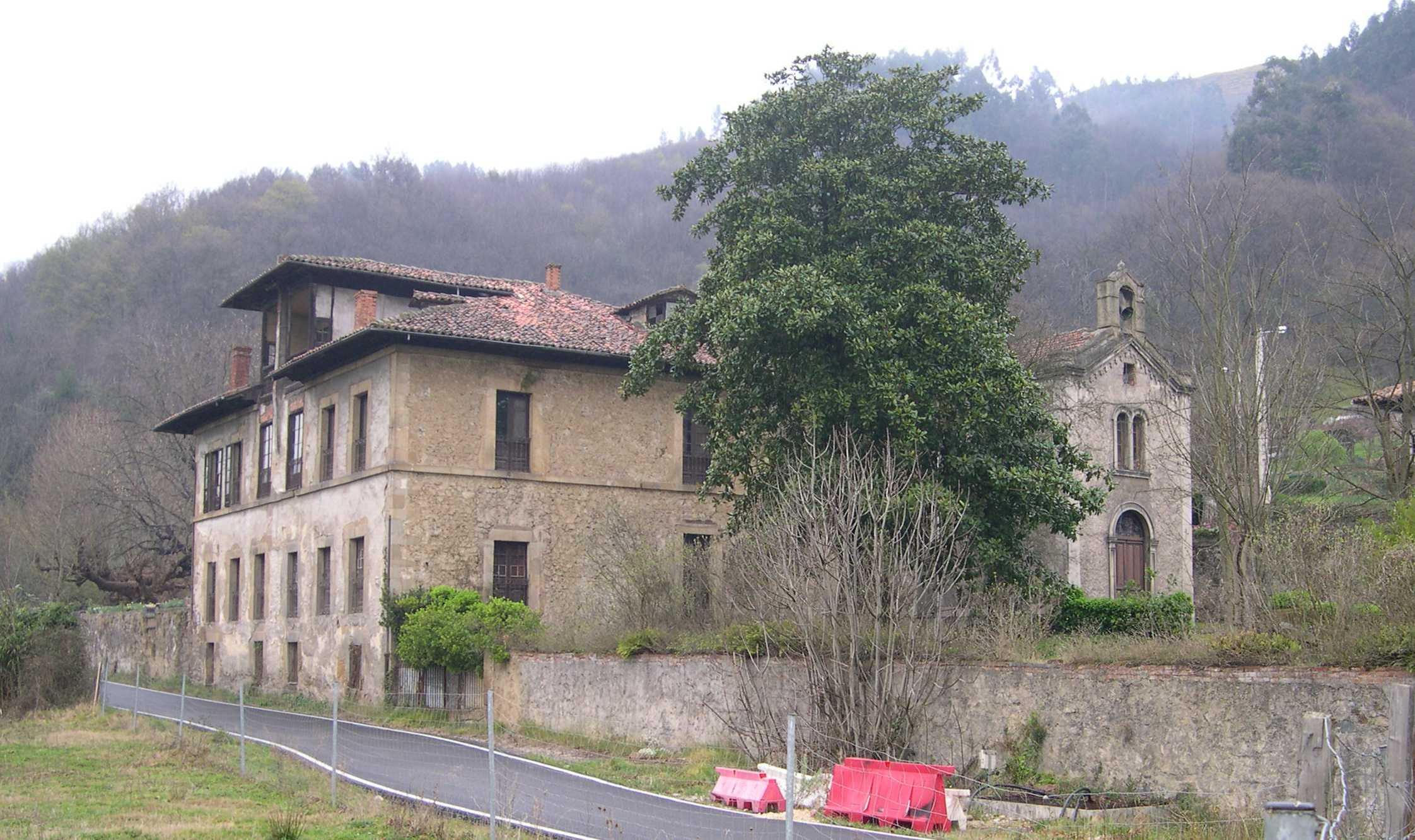
Palaciu del Marqués de Camposagrado, in Riañu

Riañu (Spanish: Riaño) is one of the six parishes (administrative divisions) in Langreo, a municipality within the province and autonomous community of Asturias, in northern Spain.

The residential area of Riañu was built on the existing farmland in the area during the 1960s, in order to decongest the urban core of Langreo. Today, about 5,000 people live in the parish.

In 1978, a hospital, the Hospital Valle del Nalón, was opened in the parish. Riañu also has a medical center, a library, a sports center, two public schools, and a geriatric facility. It is located three kilometres from la Felguera.

Palacio de Camposagrado is a historic palace located in the district.

Riañu is approximately 219 meters above sea level.
