= Felguera Factory =

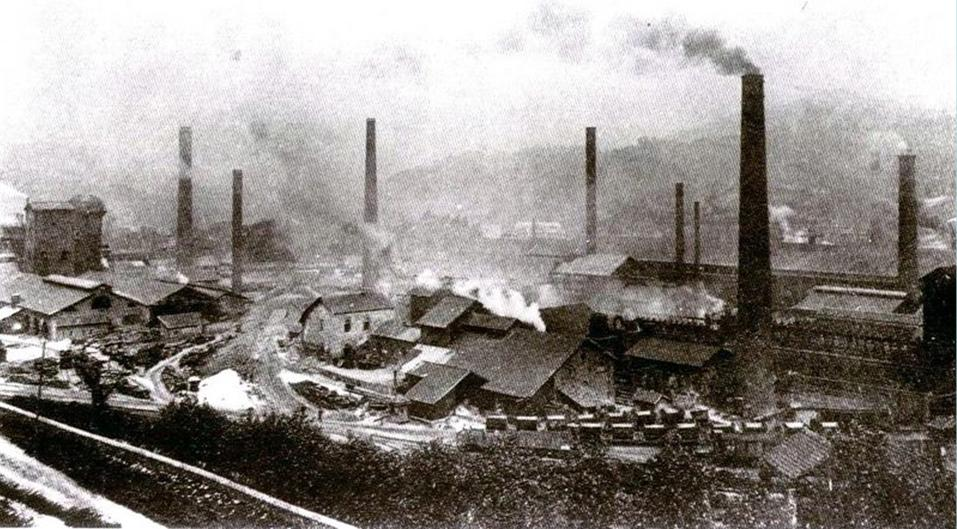
Felguera Factory

Felguera Factory (in Spanish Fábrica de La Felguera) was the early manufacturing facility of what is now the company Duro Felguera, located in La Felguera, (Principality of Asturias, northern Spain). Although the facility is no longer in operation, the Museum of the Siderurgy (ferrous metallurgy) is located in one of the structures.

La Factoría de Gíl y Compañía existed in the area, in the Vega neighborhood, since 1856. Pedro Duro founded the Sociedad Metalúrgica de Langreo (Langreo Metallurgical Society) on 21 May 1857. He built his company with his partners Vicente Bayo and Francisco Antonio de Elorza y Aguirre, between 1857 and 1859 on land known as El Pradón de La Felguera (English: The big meadow of La Felguera). The furnace was lit in 1859, and iron was produced the following year. His intention was to introduce the modern steel industry into the town, taking advantage of existing area resources, such as coal, the rivers Nalón and Candín, the Carbonera Road, and Langreo Railway, which joined the municipality of Langreo with Gijón. It was one of the most important steel and iron works centers in Spain and promoted the progress of Asturias as an industrial region. The factory closed in 1984.

== Gallery ==
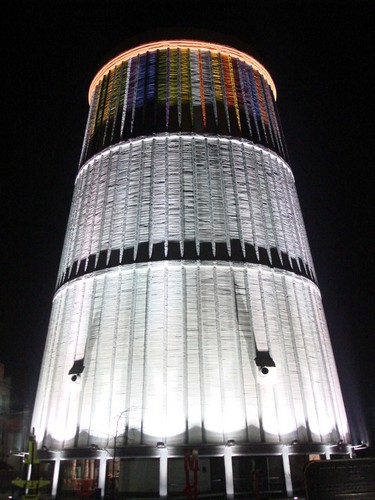
Current Museum of Siderugy

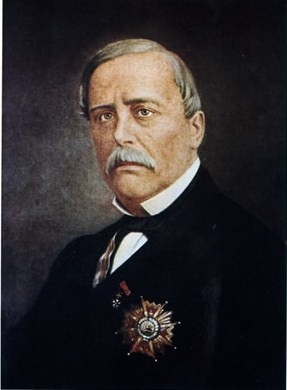
Pedro Duro

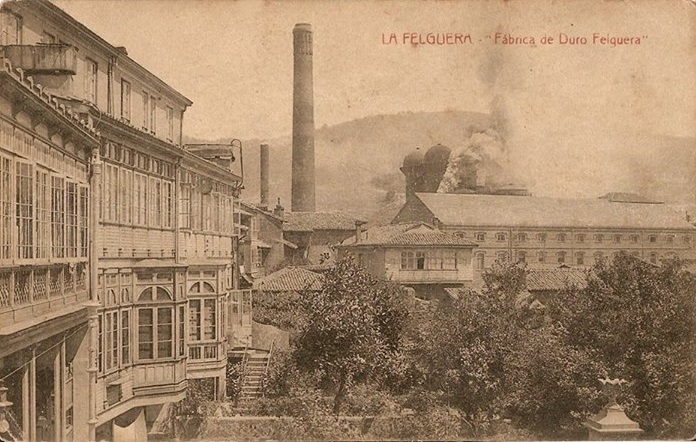
Felguera Factory in the early 20th century

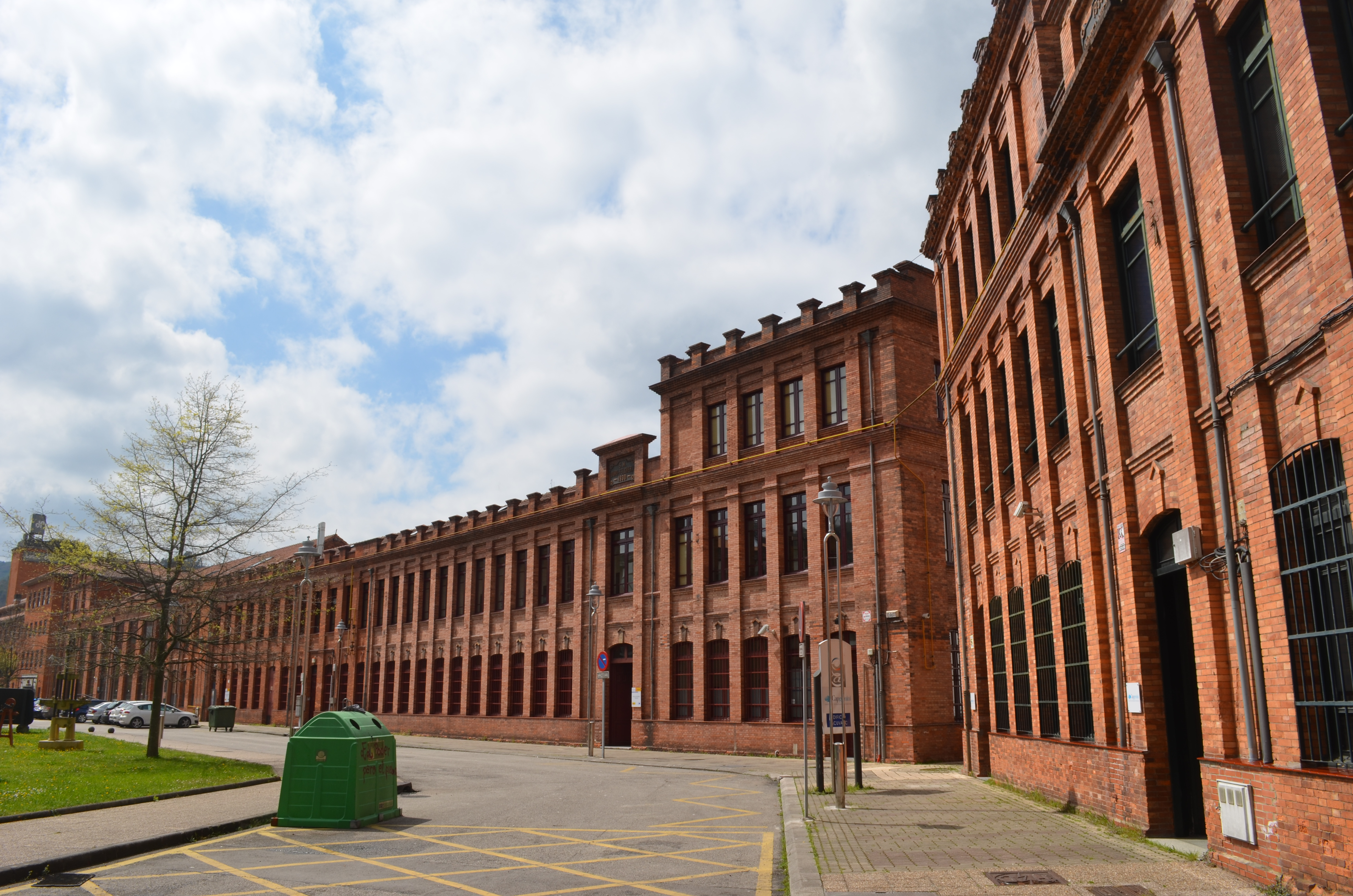
Laboratories building today

== Bibliography ==
- Duro Felguera, una empresa de tres siglos Germán Ojeda. Nobel. La Felguera 2008
- Duro Felguera, historia de una gran empresa industrial. Germán Ojeda. Grupo Duro Felguera. Oviedo 2000
- La Fábrica de Duro Felguera. Imágenes 1984-1986. Antonio Ramón Felgueroso Durán. La Felguera 2005
- Pedro Duro, un capitán de la industria española. Francisco Palacios. Grupo Duro Felguera. Langreo 2008
