= Pedro Duro =

Spanish businessman

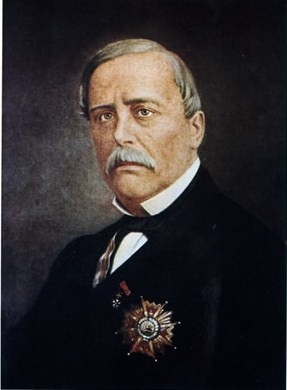
- Portrait by Juan de Barroeta
- Born: Pedro Duro Benito; 5 December 1810; Brieva de Cameros, La Rioja
- Died: 11 March 1886 (aged 75); La Felguera, Principality of Asturias
- Resting place: La Felguera
- Occupation: Businessman
- Spouse: Dolores Ortiz
- Children: Pilar Duro

Pedro Duro Benito (1810–1886) was a Spanish businessman of the 19th century; founder of the industrial group Duro Felguera and a pioneer of ironworking in Spain.

== Biography ==
Duro was born in Brieva de Cameros, La Rioja, and he died in the Principality of Asturias in 1886. He began construction on the Felguera Factory in 1857; a metallurgical factory that became the most important in Spain in the 19th century, and through the 20th century until the 1960s. It was the first major ironworks that were constructed in Spain. His descendants were created Marquesses of La Felguera by King Alfonso XIII. In addition, Duro was awarded the Order of Isabella the Catholic and the Légion d'honneur from the French government. He was buried in La Felguera, where the workers of his factory raised a big monument. He was also a pioneer in social measures for workers. His work motivated, in addition, industrial expansion in the north of Spain. Today the company that he created is called "Duro Felguera" and it has been traded on the Spanish stock exchange since 1902.
