= Duro Felguera =

International business group

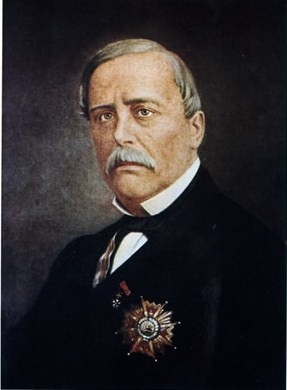
Pedro Duro was the founder of Duro Felguera

Duro Felguera, SA (BMAD: MDF) is an international business group with headquarters in the Science and Technology Park of Gijón, Asturias, Spain. It specializes in the implementation of turn key projects for the energy and industrial sectors, as well as the manufacturing of goods. Its origins date back to the Felguera Factory, hence its name, which was founded by Pedro Duro in 1858. The company specializes in equipment for refineries, chemical and petrochemical plants, components for wind farms, tunneling machines and equipment for large laboratories and research centers and is responsible for engineering, procurement, construction, installation, operation and maintenance projects undertaken. Its president is Ángel Antonio del Valle.
