= Brieva de Cameros =

- Municipality
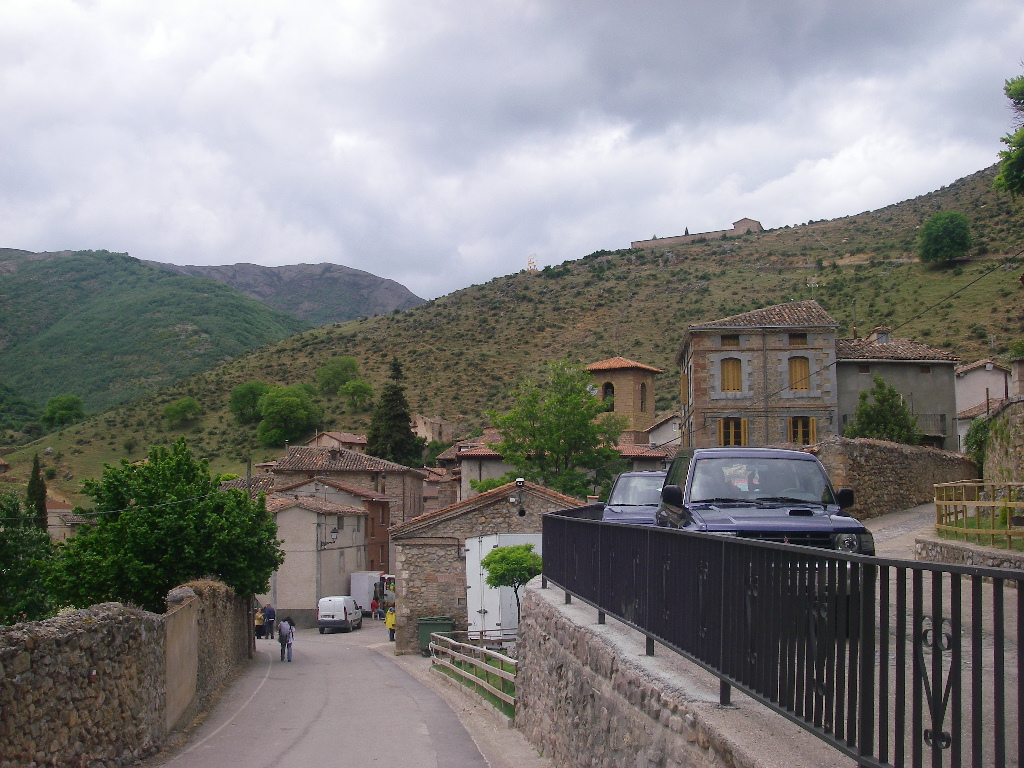
- Skyline of Brieva de Cameros

- Location within La Rioja, Spain Location within Spain
- Coordinates: 42°09′53″N 2°47′41″W
- Country: Spain
- Autonomous community: La Rioja
- Comarca: Anguiano

Government
  - Mayor: Pedro Somalo Gracia (PSOE)

Area
  - Total: 46.15 km^{2} (17.82 sq mi)
- Elevation: 973 m (3,192 ft)

Population (2025-01-01)
  - Total: 38
- Demonym(s): cortezudo, da
- Postal code: 26324
- Website: Official website

Brieva de Cameros is a village in the province and autonomous community of La Rioja, Spain. The municipality covers an area of 46.15 square kilometres (17.82 sq mi) and as of 2011 had a population of 60 people.
