= La Felguera =

Coordinates: 43°18′37″N 5°41′31″W

- Parish
- Interactive map of La Felguera
- Country: Spain
- Autonomous community: Asturias
- Province: Asturias
- Municipality: Langreo

La Felguera is a parish of Langreo, and the most important district in the municipality of Langreo (Principality of Asturias) in northern Spain, with 21,000 inhabitants. It is located 18 minutes by car to Oviedo, the capital of Asturias. La Felguera is close to the Nalón River.

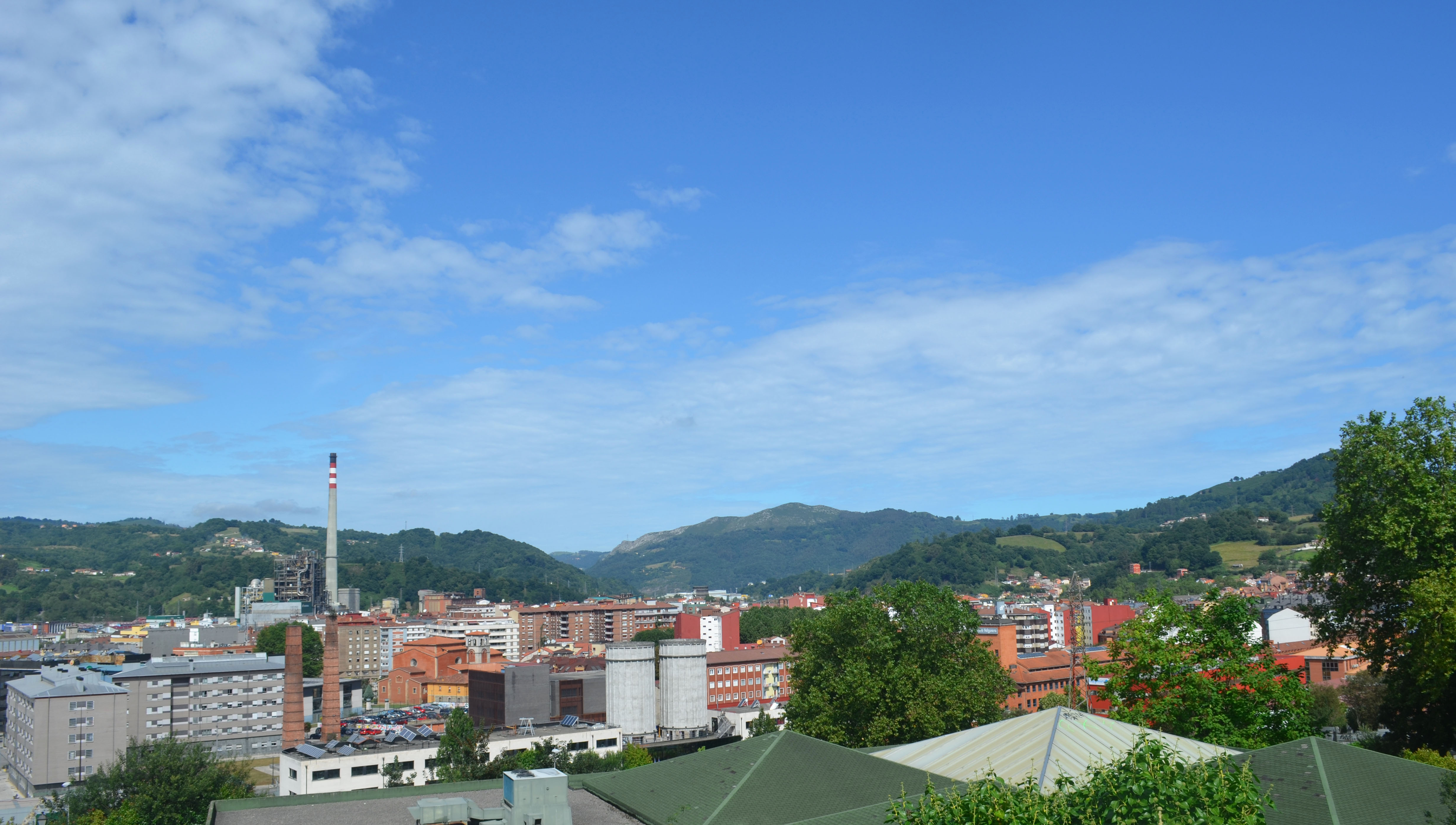
La Felguera-Langreo

== History ==
Before the 19th century, the parish was a group of small villages dedicated to livestock and agriculture.

In the 19th and first half of the 20th century, La Felguera, located in the mining region of Asturias, was one of the most important iron and steelworks centers in Spain,. In 1858, Pedro Duro founded the Felguera Factory (currently DF Group), one of the most influential coal and iron-work enterprises in Spain.

The town was the first production site in Spain for: sheet steel for shipbuilding (1887), refractory bricks (1896), railways (1868), chemical products derived from ethylene (1957) and synthetic ammonia (1925). It also had the largest blast furnace in Spain in 1943. It was also an important centers for the workers' struggle. La Felguera was declared the greatest cultural point of Europe by UNESCO in 1961.

La Felguera has numerous annual celebrations (like Saint Peter's Fiestas or Day of the Cider) and an art gallery, Pinacoteca Eduardo Úrculo. The International Tales Competition is one of the most important in the Spanish language. Today, it shelters the center of new companies and technologies Valnalón and the Museum of the Siderurgy.

=== Industrial Heritage site ===
Important buildings are the church of San Pedro, the chapel El Llungéru, the former iron works factory Duro Felguera, engineers' houses in the street Conde Sizzo, former La Salle trade school, the engineers' chalet, Pedro Duro's statue, the Urquijo neighborhood, railway station, the former Nitrastur factory, the market and three parks (Dolores Duro, Sutu and García Lago).

== Gallery ==
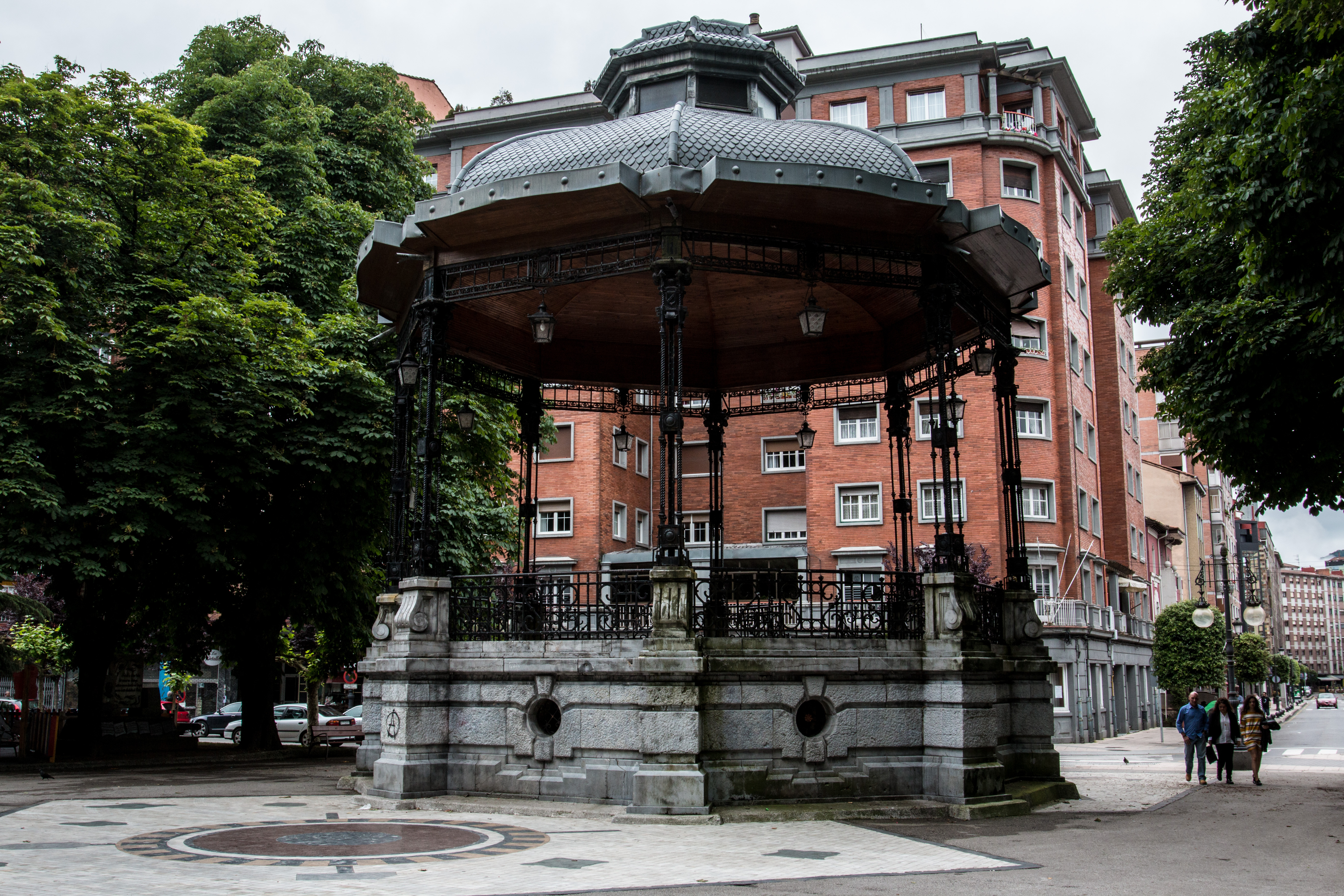
Dolores Duro park

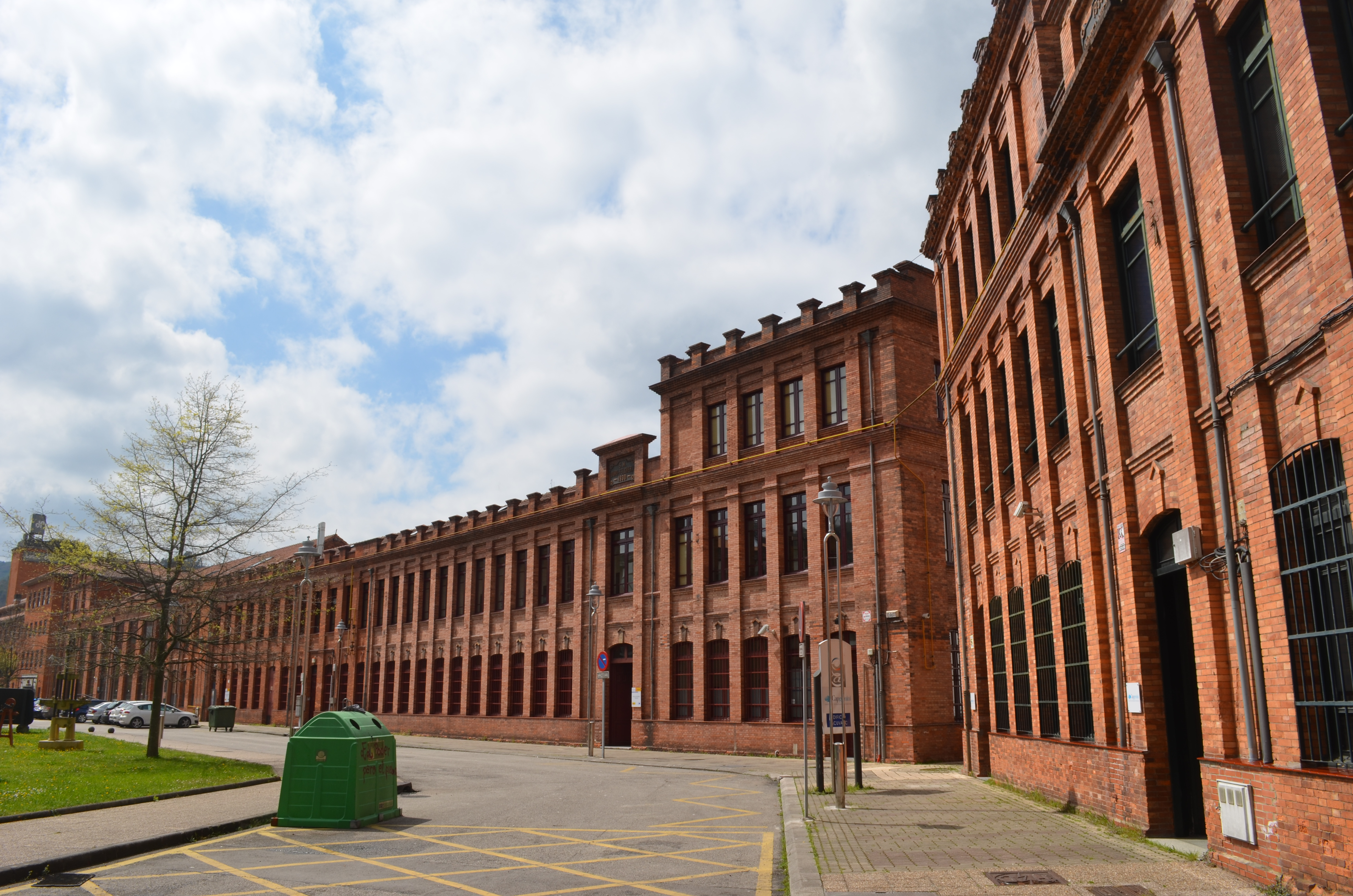
Former La Felguera steelworks factory

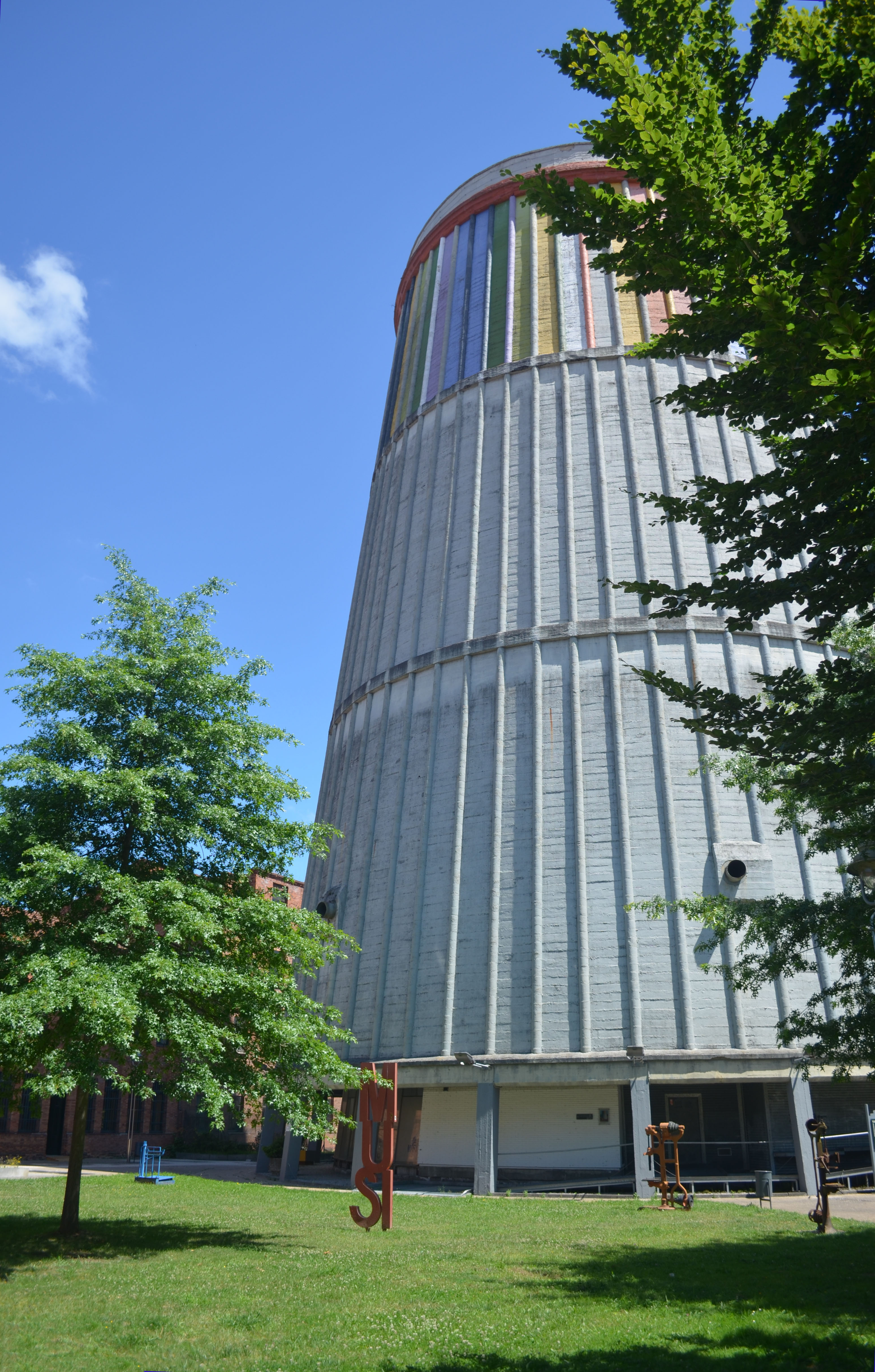
Industry museum

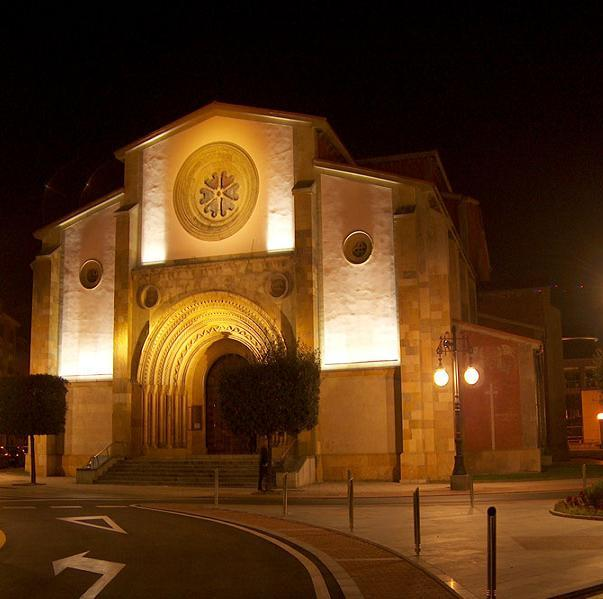
San Pedro church

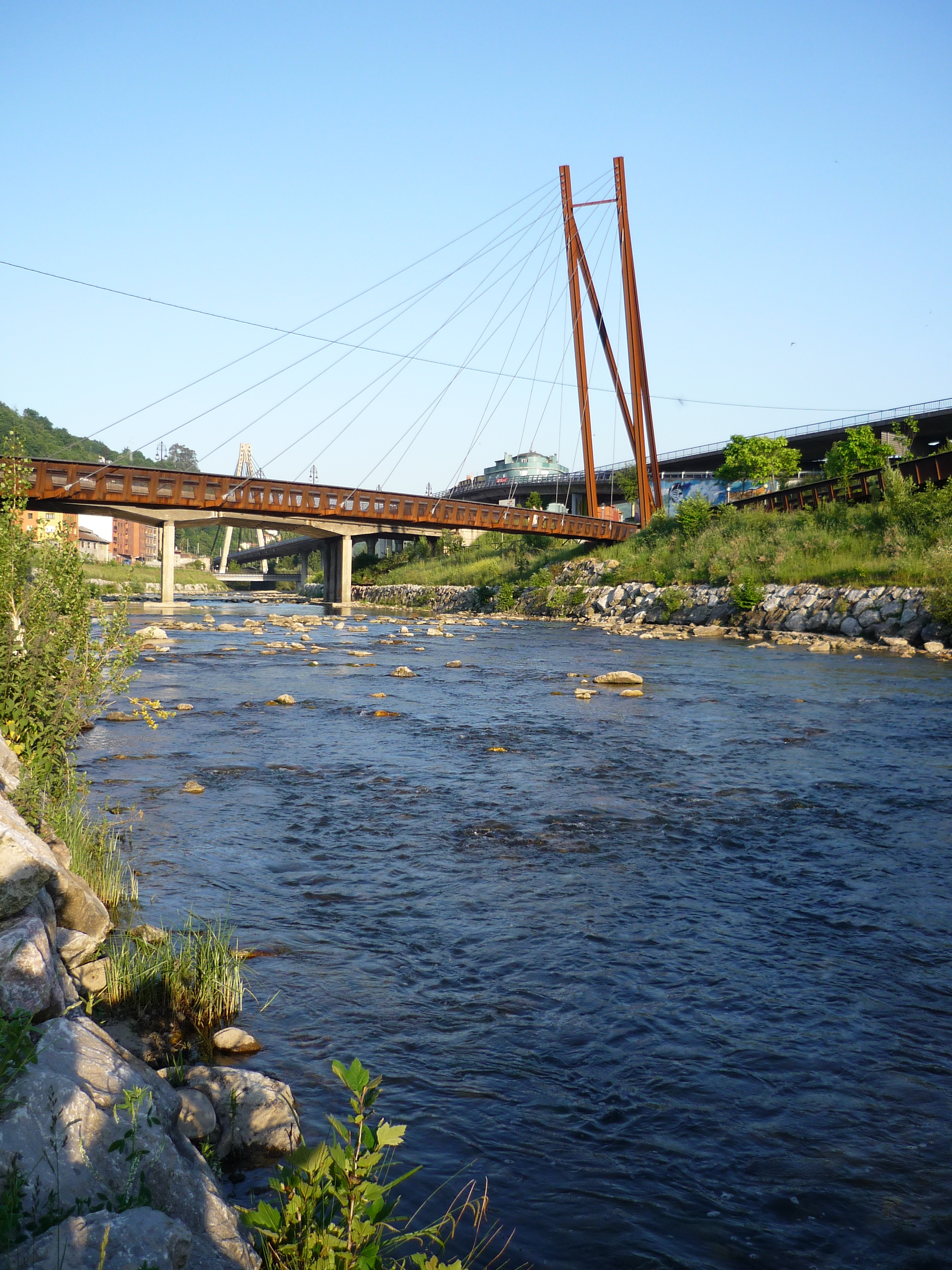
Nalón river path

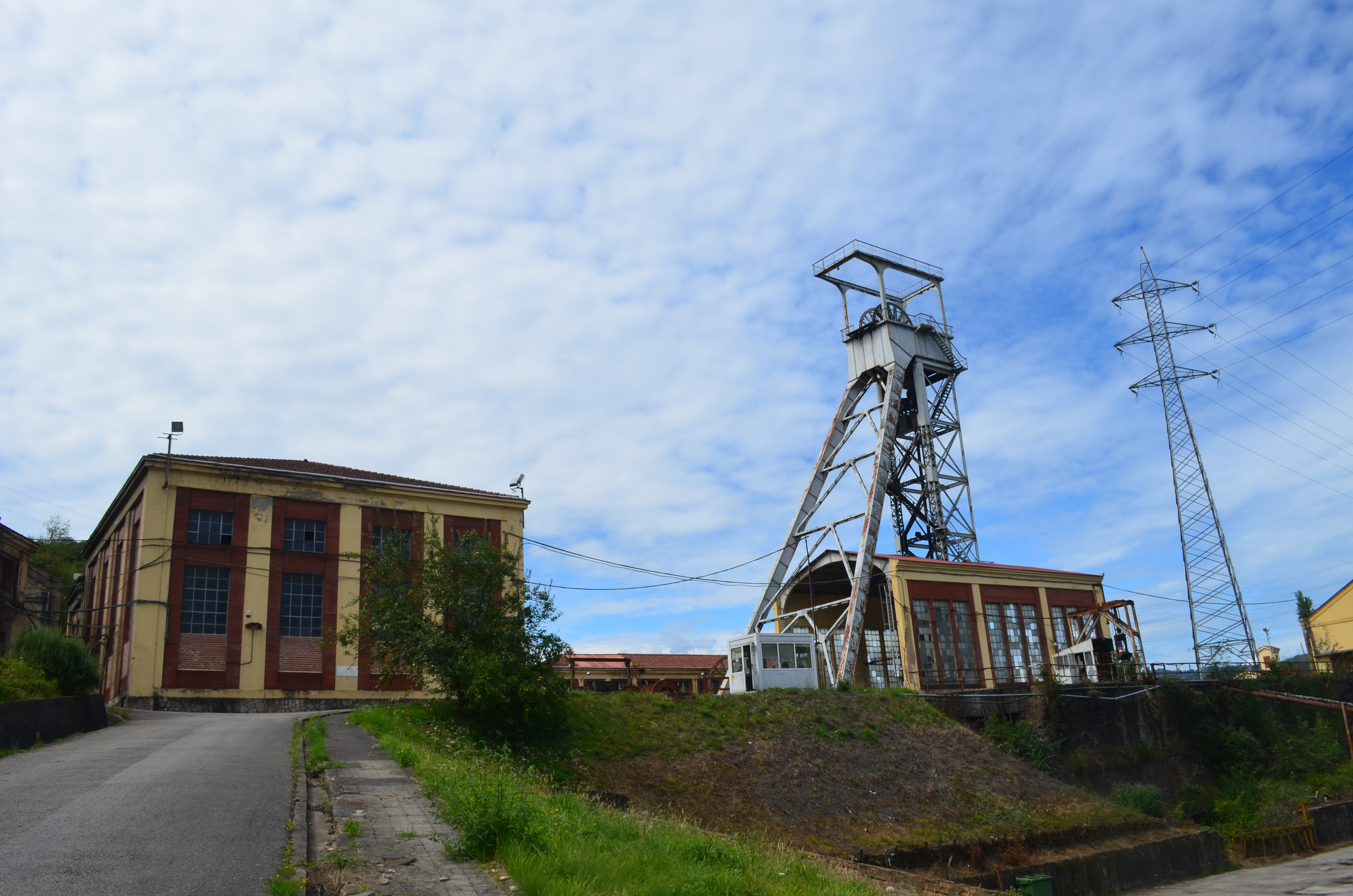
Candin former coal mine
