= Valnalón =

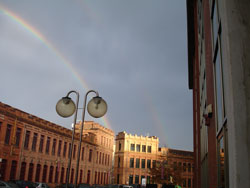
Ciudad Tecnológica Valnalón

VALNALON (Ciudad Industrial del Valle del Nalón, S.A.U.) was created by the Department for Industry and Labour of the Government of the Principality of Asturias, Spain in 1987. The goal is to design and implement a plan to regenerate, promote and dynamise a former industrial area in Nalon River Valley. In order to achieve this, some of the most outstanding century-old buildings in the Felguera Factory, steelworks factory compound, whose gates closed in 1984, were refurbished.

== Aims ==
The plan has evolved, tilting the focus from the development of infrastructures (Business centre, industrial estate, training centre) to a firm commitment to develop entrepreneurship in order to change mindsets, facilitating the transition from the industrial age to a more entrepreneurial society.

=== Technological city ===
The concept Industrial City has morphed into Technological City mainly driven by the creation and development of start-ups in the Information and Communication Technologies (ICT) sector.

=== Action plan ===
In 1993 Valnalon was commissioned by Asturias regional government to implement the recently launched Asturias Entrepreneurship Action Plan (Cadena de Formación para Emprender) with two priority areas:

Education

Entrepreneurship education, whose goal is to develop enterprising skills and attitudes in all levels of the education system.

Promotion

Business promotion, whose goal is to support business development.

== Stakeholders ==
In this sense, Valnalon seeks to engage a wide array of stakeholders as all of them should be involved and contribute to the development of an entrepreneurial culture.
