= Gonzalo Anes =

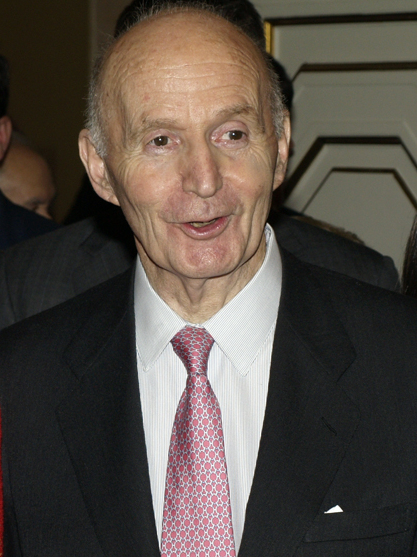
- Anes in February 2009
- Born: 10 December 1931; Trelles, Coaña, Asturias, Spain
- Died: 31 March 2014 (aged 82); Madrid, Spain
- Occupations: Economic History Professor, Bank of Spain Board Member, Prado Museum Board President, Royal Academy of History Director
- Known for: Marquis of Castrillón (2010-2014)

Gonzalo Anes Álvarez de Castrillón (10 December 1931 – 31 March 2014) was a Spanish economist, professor and historian. He was director of the Royal Academy of History.

He was born in Trelles, Coaña, Asturias, and died on 31 March 2014 in Madrid.

== Honours ==
He was a winner of the King Juan Carlos Prize in Economics. In recognition of his work, he was made Marquis of Castrillón, a title he held from 2010 until his death in 2014.

== Other websites ==
- Gonzalo Anes at the Royal Academy of History
