= Diccionario biográfico español =

- Edited by: Print edition: Gonzalo Anes, Jaime Olmedo, Quintín Aldea Vaquero. Electronic edition: Carmen Iglesias
- Country: Spain
- Language: Spanish
- Discipline: History
- Publisher: Real Academia de la Historia
- OCLC: 729345746
- Website: https://dbe.rah.es/

Diccionario biográfico español is a Spanish biographical dictionary published by the Real Academia de la Historia.

== History ==
On 23 May 1735 Felipe V approved the constitution of Real Academia de la Historia. The Academy's first Director Agustín de Montiano y Luyando proposed to create a Diccionario histórico-crítico de España. However, resources were limited and the Diccionario biográfico español did not get underway until the end of the twentieth century.

== Printed edition ==
The Dictionary was edited by Gonzalo Anes (the then Director of the Academy), Jaime Olmedo, and Quintín Aldea Vaquero. It was written over ten years by 5,000 historians. It consists of 50 volumes with 45,000 pages and 40,000 biographies of notable figures in Spanish history, from the 7th century BC to the present. The first twenty-five volumes were published in 2011 with the remaining volumes completed by 2013.

== Electronic edition ==
The electronic version of the dictionary was launched formally by the King and Queen of Spain in 2018, although some material had been available online previously. Carmen Iglesias, who became director of the Real Academia de la Historia in 2014, was the historian responsible for the electronic version, which differs in some respects from the printed version which preceded it. It is intended that any errors will be corrected continuously.

The printed edition contains information about living persons, whereas so far the electronic edition is restricted to deceased persons. The difficulty of writing objectively about living people was one of the criticisms of the Dictionary when it appeared. Another source of controversy was the treatment of Francisco Franco, who initially was not described as a dictator. His entry was revised for the online version.
