= Aitor Fernández =

Aitor Fernández may refer to:

- Aitor Fernández (footballer, born 1986), Spanish footballer
- Aitor Fernández (footballer, born 1991), Spanish footballer
