= Enrique V. Iglesias =

President of the Inter-American Development Bank

Enrique Iglesias
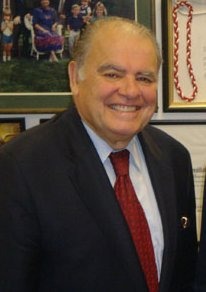
- Enrique Iglesias en 2005.
- Born: Enrique Valentín Iglesias García; 29 July 1930 (age 96); Arancedo, España
- Education: Universidad de la República
- Occupations: economist, politician, writer
- Awards: Premio Morosoli; Premio Alas; Prince of Asturias Award

Enrique Valentín Iglesias García (born 29 July 1930 in Arancedo, Asturias) is a Spanish-Uruguayan economist. He served as the first president of the Central Bank of Uruguay from 1967 to 1969. He has also served as President of the Inter-American Development Bank from 1988 to 2005, an international institution dedicated to furthering economic development in the Western Hemisphere through investment and policy formulation. He was appointed Special Adviser for Venezuela to Federica Mogherini, the European Union's High Representative for Foreign Affairs and Security Policy and Vice-President of the European Commission, on 28 May 2019.

== Biography ==
Enrique was born in Asturias, Spain, in 1930 to Isabel García and Manuel Iglesias. His parents emigrated to Uruguay in 1934 and Enrique was naturalized as a Uruguayan citizen, he currently holds Uruguayan-Spanish dual citizenship. By university, Iglesias had established an interest in government and economics; in 1953, he graduated from Uruguay's Universidad de la República with a degree in economics and business administration. After graduation, he went on to private-sector banking, which led to a term as the president of Uruguay's Central Bank (1967-1969). Iglesias held a variety of influential posts, including Minister of Foreign Relations, before being elected president of the Inter-American Development Bank (IDB) in 1988.

During Iglesias's first and second terms as president, the IDB concluded negotiations for its Seventh (1989) and Eighth (1994) General Increase in Resources. Respectively, these negotiations increased the Bank's ordinary capital by US$26.5 billion and $101 billion.

Iglesias is an honorary member in The Club of Rome, promoting a one world government.

He is also a member of the Fondation Chirac's honour committee, ever since the foundation was launched in 2008 by former French president Jacques Chirac in order to promote world peace.

== Political views and controversy ==
Iglesias is a strong proponent of open markets and multilateralism, with a strong interest in energy reform. Under Iglesias' tenure, the IDB has received criticism about its funding of the project. In a report recently leaked by U.S. Amazon lobby group Amazon Watch, Peru's Ministry of Health found that "22 indigenous people died after exposure to respiratory illnesses from gas pipeline workers and 30% of the 500-strong Nanti tribe has died since 1995". The subject is especially delicate since many of the indigenous people in question have little contact with the developed world and do not possess the antibodies to contagious diseases brought by outsiders. The IDB met in Lima, Peru, the week of March 29, 2004 to discuss this and other problems.

== Post-IDB Career ==
On June 1, 2005, Iglesias announced his resignation from the IDB, effective September 30, 2005. Later in 2005 he became secretary-general of the Ibero-American General Secretariat, a new organization to facilitate cooperation between Latin America, Spain, and Portugal.

Enrique Igleasias is a Member of the Global Leadership Foundation, an organization which works to support democratic leadership, prevent and resolve conflict through mediation and promote good governance in the form of democratic institutions, open markets, human rights and the rule of law. It does so by making available, discreetly and in confidence, the experience of former leaders to today's national leaders. It is a not-for-profit organization composed of former heads of government, senior governmental and international organization officials who work closely with Heads of Government on governance-related issues of concern to them. He is also a member of Washington D.C.–based think tank, the Inter-American Dialogue.

== Honorary degrees ==
- 1991: Doctorate in Law, Carleton University, Ottawa, Ontario, Canada
- 1994: Universidad Autónoma de Guadalajara, Guadalajara, Jalisco, Mexico
- 1994: Cândido Mendes University, Rio de Janeiro, Brazil
- 2000: Southeastern Louisiana University, Louisiana, U.S.
- 2002: Honoris Causa Degree Universidad de las Américas Puebla, Cholula, Puebla, Mexico

== Honours and awards ==
Coat of arms as knight of the Order of the Golden Fleece.

- Prince of Asturias Award, Spain
- Favorite Son of Asturias, Spain
- Favorite Son of Oviedo, Spain
- Order of Rio Branco, Brazil
- Order of the Southern Cross, Brazil
- Grand Cross Silver, Council of the National Order of Juan Mora Fernández, Costa Rica
- Order of the Legion of Honor, France
- 1987: Knight Grand Cross of the Royal Order of Isabella the Catholic, Spain
- Notre Dame Prize for Distinguished Public Service in Latin America, University of Notre Dame, Notre Dame, Indiana, U.S.
- 1999: Order of Arts and Letters of the French Republic, France
- 2000: International Order of Merit, City of New Orleans, Louisiana, U.S.
- 2006: Grand Cordon of the Order of the Rising Sun, Japan
- 2014: Knight of the Order of the Golden Fleece, Spain

== Professional chronology ==
- 1954–1966: Managing Director, Unión de Bancos del Uruguay
- 1967–1969: President, Central Bank of Uruguay
- 1972–1985: Executive Secretary, United Nations Economic Commission for Latin America and the Caribbean (ECLAC)
- 1981: Secretary General, United Nations Conference on New and Renewable Sources of Energy (Kenya)
- 1985–1988: Minister of Foreign Relations, Uruguay

== Published works ==
Iglesias has published quite a few articles and papers. His books include:

- ECLAC and the Economic Relations of Latin America
- Perspectives on Economic Development in Latin America
- Uruguay, a Proposal for Change
- Latin America on the Threshold of the 1980s
- The Energy Challenge
- Development and Equity: The Challenge of the 1980s

Preceded by Antonio Ortiz Mena	President of the Inter-American Development Bank; 1988–2005	Succeeded by Luis Alberto Moreno
