= Maravall =

Maravall is a surname. Notable people with the name include:

- Agustín Maravall (born 1944), Spanish economist
- José Antonio Maravall (1911–1986), Spanish historian and essayist
- José María Maravall, FBA (born 1942), Spanish academic and politician
- Teresita Maravall (1893–1980), Spanish tonadillera, cupletista, actress
