= El Franco =

Municipality in Asturias, Spain

- Municipality
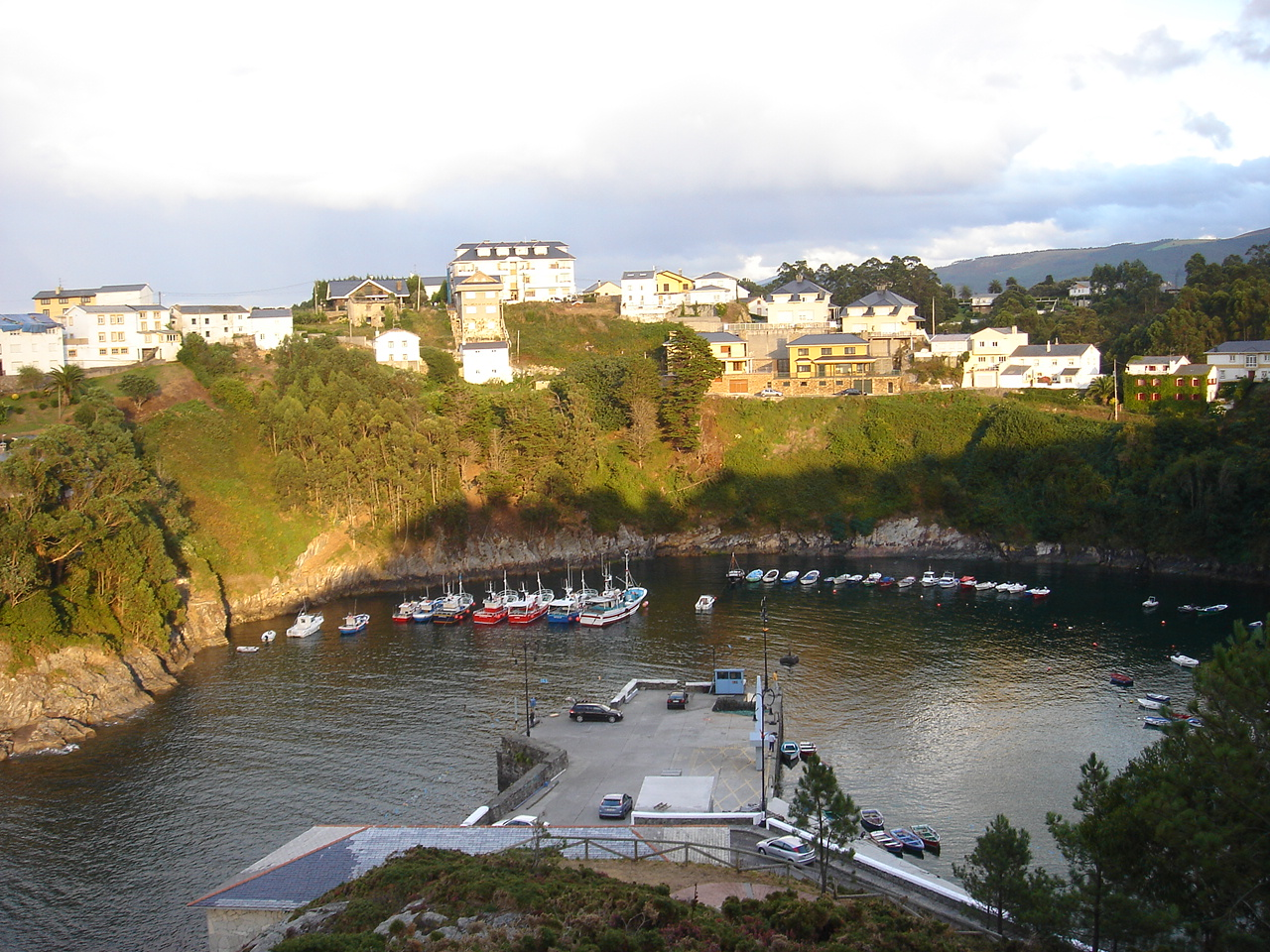
- Port of El Porto/Viavélez

- Coat of arms

- Location in Spain
- Coordinates: 43°33′N 6°52′W
- Country: Spain
- Autonomous community: Asturias
- Province: Asturias
- Comarca: Eo-Navia
- Judicial district: Castropol
- Capital: A Caridá

Government
  - Alcalde: Cecilia Pérez Sánchez (PSOE)

Area
  - Total: 78.04 km^{2} (30.13 sq mi)
- Highest elevation: 899 m (2,949 ft)

Population (2025-01-01)
  - Total: 3,728
  - Density: 47.77/km^{2} (123.7/sq mi)
- Demonym: franquino/a
- Time zone: UTC+1 (CET)
  - Summer (DST): UTC+2 (CEST)
- Postal code: 33746 and del 33756 to 33759
- Website: www.elfranco.es/,%20https://www.elfranco.net/

El Franco is a municipality in the autonomous community of the Principality of Asturias. It is bordered on the north by the Cantabrian Sea, to the west by Tapia, to the south by Castropol and Boal, and to the east by Cuaña. El Franco is part of the comarca of Eo-Navia.

The Porcía and Mazo Rivers pass through the municipality.

== History ==
Artifacts from the Neolithic Age indicate an early settlement of the region. The remains of hillforts are visible, in Arancedo as well as in neighbouring Coaña and Mohias. In the 18th century, the gold mines, which are still in use, were found near the embankment castle of Arancedo. During the Middle Ages, El Franco was split between the Lugo and Oviedo dioceses, and the administrative capital was in Castropol. In 1852, the administrative seat was moved to El Franco in the parish of A Caridá.

El Franco is the birthplace of Corín Tellado, one of the world's best-selling writers in the Spanish language.

== Demographics ==
Historical population
| Year | Pop. | ±% |
|---|---|---|
| 1991 | 4,268 | — |
| 1996 | 4,193 | −1.8% |
| 2001 | 4,123 | −1.7% |
| 2004 | 4,112 | −0.3% |
| 2006 | 4,065 | −1.1% |
| 2007 | 4,015 | −1.2% |

== Economy ==
The top industries are livestock and fishery. The milk industry had the highest growth, after preventive measures of the EU started to affect the fishing industry. The tourism industry and administrative companies form the second largest sector of the economy and tourism has the biggest growth of the region. Smaller commercial companies and production companies are found predominantly in the small industrial parks of the adjoining municipality.

== Politics ==
| | PSOE | PP | IU-BA | Others | Total |
|---|---|---|---|---|---|
| 2003 | 6 | 5 | 0 | 0 | 11 |
| 2007 | 6 | 4 | 1 | 0 | 11 |

== Parishes ==
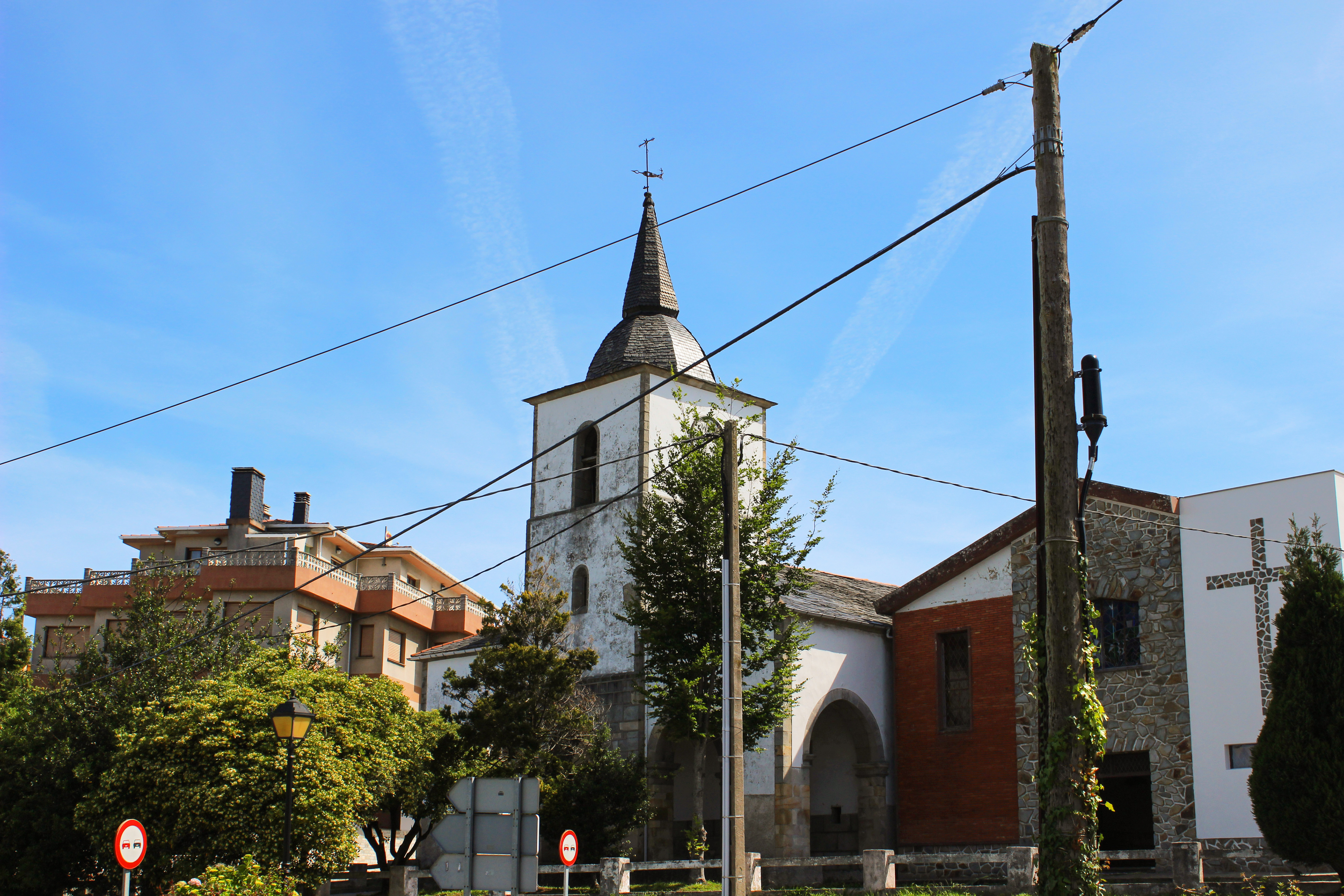
La Caridad, the capital of El Franco

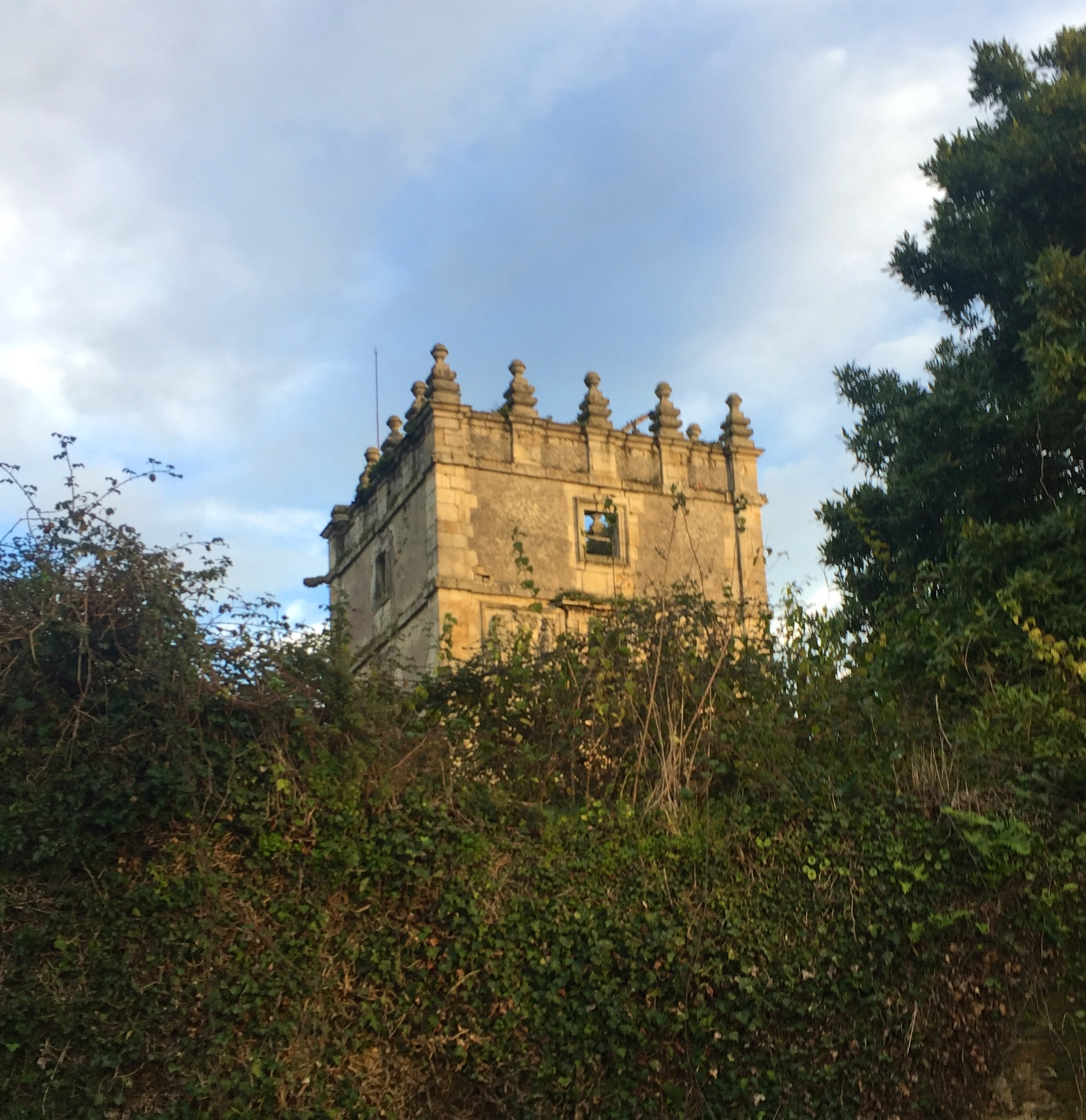
Lienes Palace

- Arancedo
- A Braña
- A Caridá
- Llebredo
- Miudes
- San Xuan de Prendonés/San Juan de Prendonés
- Valdepares
- Villalmarzo

== Points of interest ==
- Church of Santa María, built on a romanesque foundation, finished in the 18th century
- Miudes palace, from the 16th century
- Fonfría palace, from the 16th century
- Jardón palace
- Valdepares tower

== Festivals and fairs ==
- 24 June, San Juan de Prendones in Valdepares
- 16 July, el Carmen in Miudes
- 2 August, Santo Ángel in Viavélez
- From 8 September on, el día de los Remedios

== See also ==
- List of municipalities in Asturias
