= Cartavio =

- Parish
- Location within Spain
- Coordinates: 43.55°N 6.75°W
- Country: Spain
- Autonomous community: Asturias
- Province: Asturias
- Municipality: Cuaña

Cartavio is one of seven parishes (administrative divisions) in the Cuaña municipality, within the province and autonomous community of Asturias, in northern Spain.

The population is 602 (INE 2007).

== Villages ==
- Cartavio
- El Esteler
- Lloza
- Llugarnovo
- San Cristóbal
- Silvarronda
- Villalocái
- Xonte
