= Economist =

Professional in the discipline of economics

An economist is a professional and practitioner in the social science discipline of economics.

The individual may also study, develop, and apply theories and concepts from economics and write about economic policy. Within this field there are many sub-fields, ranging from the broad philosophical theories to the focused study of minutiae within specific markets, macroeconomic analysis, microeconomic analysis or financial statement analysis, involving analytical methods and tools such as econometrics, statistics, economics computational models, financial economics, regulatory impact analysis and mathematical economics.

== History of the profession ==
Although economists are now recognized as specialists in a distinct profession, the earliest contributors to economic thought were polymath philosophers. Some of the earliest economic writings date to antiquity, notably Aristotle’s Oeconomica and Xenophon’s Oeconomicus. These works addressed, in rudimentary form, themes such as the division of labour.

In the seventeenth century, as early modern economic thought began to take shape, its leading writers were typically broad-ranging scholars who wrote on economics alongside philosophy and law. This was true of Richard Cantillon, who described what later came to be known as the Cantillon effect, and of David Hume, who anticipated the quantity theory of money. In 1690, Nicholas Barbon, the inventor of mortgages, wrote A Discourse of Trade, one of the first works promoting free trade, and analyzing the nature of capital markets.

Adam Smith, in An Inquiry into the Nature and Causes of the Wealth of Nations, wrote one of the first major works devoted entirely to economics, helping to establish economics as a distinct field within the social sciences. His seminal work gave rise to several intellectual traditions, including the classical school (notably David Ricardo and Jean-Baptiste Say) and, in reaction, Marxism, following the writings of Karl Marx.

Economics became increasingly professionalized over the course of the nineteenth century. Jean-Baptiste Say held France’s first chair in economics at the Conservatoire national des arts et métiers in the early part of the century. By the end of the century, most economists associated with the neoclassical school were academics, often trained in mathematics. The figure of the economist thus shifted from that of the polymath scholar to that of a specialized intellectual.

Over the course of the twentieth century, advances in economic theory associated with John Maynard Keynes, Paul Samuelson, and Milton Friedman contributed to the emergence of several major schools of thought: Keynesian economics, soon integrated through Samuelson’s neoclassical synthesis, and then Friedman’s monetarism, which in turn influenced the development of new classical economics.

The 2008 financial crisis led to the Great Recession. This prompted some macroeconomists and Financial Economists to question the current orthodoxy. One response was the Keynesian resurgence. This emerged as a consensus among some policy makers and economists for Keynesian solutions.

== Professions ==
=== Education and training ===
A professional working inside of one of many fields of economics or having an academic degree in this subject is often considered to be an economist; In the U.S. Government, on the other hand, a person can be hired as an economist provided that they have a degree that included or was supplemented by 21 semester hours in economics and three hours in statistics, accounting, or calculus. see Bachelor of Economics and Master of Economics.

=== Employment and roles ===
Economists work in many fields including academia, government and in the private sector, where they may also "study data and statistics in order to spot trends in economic activity, economic confidence levels, and consumer attitudes. They assess this information using advanced methods in statistical analysis, mathematics, computer programming [and] they make recommendations about ways to improve the efficiency of a system or take advantage of trends as they begin." In addition to government and academia, economists are also employed in banking, finance, accountancy, commerce, marketing, business administration, lobbying and non- or not-for profit organizations.

In many organizations, an "Economic Analyst" is a formalized role. Professionals here are employed (or engaged as consultants) to conduct research, prepare reports, or formulate plans and strategies to address economic problems. Here, as outlined, the analyst provides forecasts, analysis and advice, based upon observed trends and economic principles; this entails also collecting and processing economic and statistical data using econometric methods and statistical techniques.

==== Academia and research ====
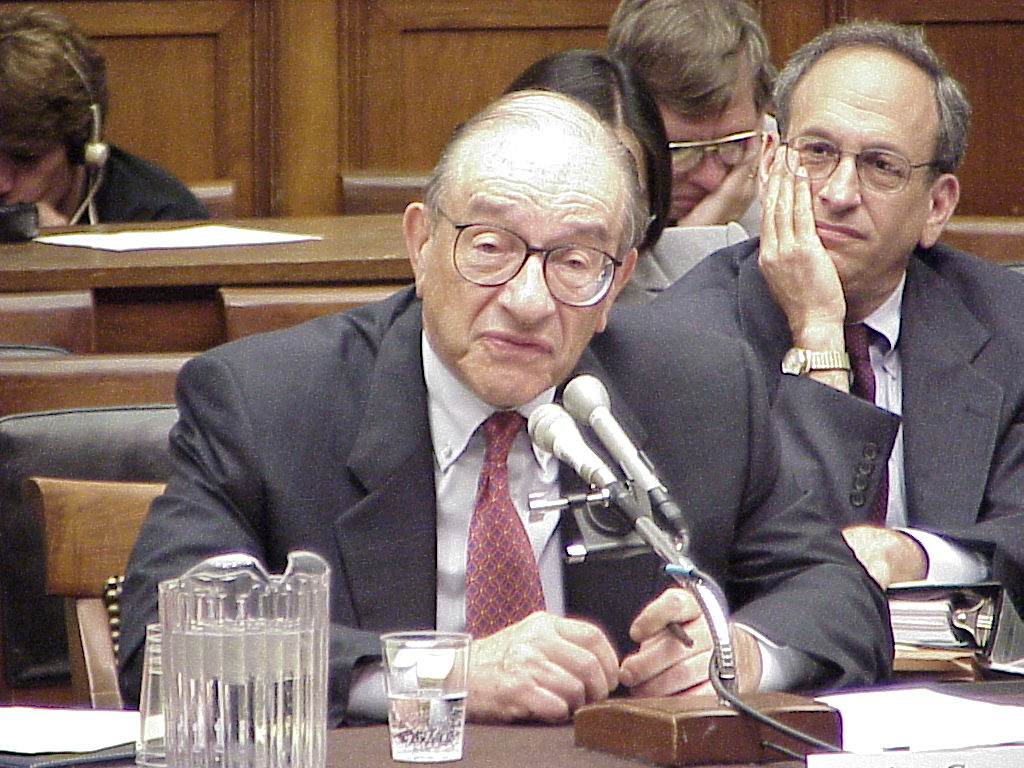
Former chair of the Federal Reserve Alan Greenspan, who obtained his Ph.D. in economics from New York University, testifies before the U.S. House Committee on Financial Services.

In academia, most economists have a Ph.D. degree in Economics.

===== Private sector =====
Economic analysts employed in financial institutions and in other large corporates, provide the (long term) economic forecasts used within their organizations. Relatedly, they consult to fund managers, risk managers, and corporate analysts regarding their investment strategy / capital budgeting decisions. Particularly in the tech sector, the focus may be microeconomic, addressing pricing, competition, and customer behavior. In either case, (chief) economists are also often included in strategy formulation.

===== Government and public policy =====
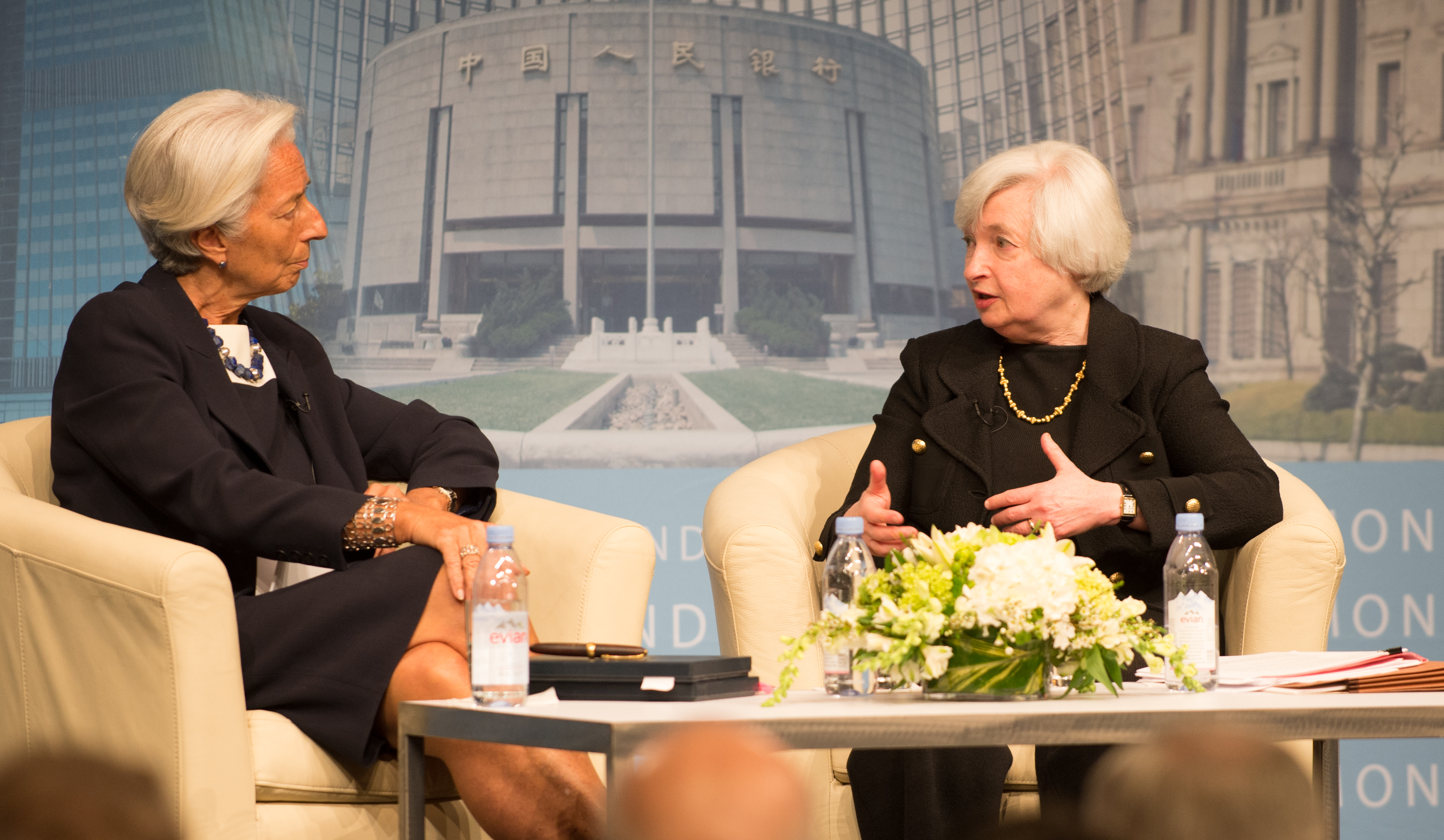
Former chair of the Federal Reserve Janet Yellen speaks with IMF Managing Director Christine Lagarde, 2014.

In the public sector, analysts advise legislators and executives on economic policy, public works, and related; politicians often consult economists before enacting economic policy; and many statesmen have academic degrees in economics. A Federal Government Economic Analyst conducts economic analysis of issues directly related to the function of their federal government agency.

=== Regulation and qualifications ===
In contrast to regulated professions such as accountancy, engineering, law or medicine, there is not a legally required educational requirement or license for economists.

==== By country ====
Economics graduates are employable in varying degrees depending on the regional economic scenario and labour market conditions at the time for a given country. Apart from the specific understanding of the subject, employers value the skills of numeracy and analysis, the ability to communicate and the capacity to grasp broad issues which the graduates acquire at the university or college. In the United Kingdom, economics graduates work across public- and private-sector settings, including government departments, consultancies, banks, insurance companies, and accountancy firms.

A number of economics graduates from around the world have been successful in obtaining employment in a variety of major national and international firms in the financial and commercial sectors, and in manufacturing, retailing and IT, as well as in the public sector – for example, in the health and education sectors, or in government and politics. Some graduates go on to undertake postgraduate studies, either in economics, research, teacher training or further qualifications in specialist areas.

===== Brazil =====
Unlike most nations, the economist profession in Brazil is regulated by law; specifically, Law No. 1,411, of August 13, 1951. The professional designation of an economist, according to said law, is exclusive to those who graduated with a Bachelor of Economics degree in Brazil.

===== United States =====
According to the United States Department of Labor, there were about 15,000 non-academic economists in the United States in 2008, with a median salary of roughly $83,000, and the top ten percent earning more than $147,040 annually. Nearly 135 colleges and universities grant around 900 new Ph.D.s every year. Incomes are highest for those in the private sector, followed by the federal government, with academia paying the lowest incomes. As of January 2013, PayScale.com showed Ph.D. economists' salary ranges as follows: all Ph.D. economists, $61,000 to $160,000; Ph.D. corporate economists, $71,000 to $207,000; economics full professors, $89,000 to $137,000; economics associate professors, $59,000 to $156,000, and economics assistant professors, $72,000 to $100,000.

===== United Kingdom =====
The largest single professional grouping of economists in the UK are the more than 3500 members of the Government Economic Service.

Analysis of destination surveys for economics graduates from a number of selected top schools of economics in the United Kingdom (ranging from Newcastle University to the London School of Economics), shows nearly 80 percent in employment six months after graduation – with a wide range of roles and employers, including regional, national and international organisations, across many sectors.

== Sociology and public perception ==
=== Status among the social sciences ===
==== Boundaries and insularity ====
Some authors argue that economics occupies a distinctive and often dominant position among the social sciences, often perceived (both inside and outside the discipline) as more scientific and formalized than its sister disciplines. This perceived superiority is visible inside the profession itself, but is also reinforced from the outside: economists earn significantly higher salaries than other social scientists, both in academia and on the wider labour market. They also have their own major prize: the Sveriges Riksbank Prize in Economic Sciences in Memory of Alfred Nobel (often referred to as the “Nobel Prize in Economics”), and they occupy a role in the making of public policy that no other social science enjoys. These features are contributing to disciplinary “insularity” and to a self-reinforcing dynamic of confidence and perceived legitimacy.

One explanation for this insularity, would be the path economics took after the Second World War: it largely set aside its moral and discursive dimensions and moved closer to the formalism of natural sciences such as physics, grounding itself in mathematics and abstract models. This formalist trajectory set economics apart from other social sciences at both epistemological and methodological levels, as economists seek to derive behaviour from theory through such models.

At the end of the twentieth century, an “empirical revolution” pushed economists to work on topics traditionally associated with sociology, without substantially reducing their insularity: Economists continue to cite each other overwhelmingly, whereas other social sciences cite one another more frequently and also cite economists. Moreover, disciplinary boundaries also reflect status relations: since economists tend to view their own discipline as more scientific than other social sciences, they may be less inclined to rely on those fields. In a Bourdieusian perspective, they describe economists as a dominant group and argue that interdisciplinary work is often not regarded as particularly valuable within the discipline.

==== Internal hierarchy and journals ====
Another distinctive feature of the field, which reinforces its special status, is an internal hierarchy that adds itself to this external one. Economics is structured around a set of methods and tools largely defined as the right ones by the top of the discipline and then diffused to the rest of the field. This hierarchy can hide or marginalize internal controversies and contribute to economists speaking with one voice, reinforcing their insularity, credibility and legitimacy in the public arena. This structure can be described as overseen by a disciplinary elite made up of prestigious departments, leading journals, and the scholars who move from the former to publish in the latter. The resulting hierarchy sets norms and standards that extend to hiring and the job market, one of the most organized and standardized in the social sciences.

A Post-war shifts can be observed in leading economics journals: a phase of intense mathematization and reliance on statistics, alongside sharply declining citation links to sociology, political science and law. From the 1980s to the 2000s, a further shift in this landscape can be observed: mathematics, which provided a methodological anchor, retreated as the main external point of reference, and finance journal citations rose in prominence in citation patterns, becoming one of the principal branches of reference within the discipline.

=== Economists in public policy and technocracy ===
==== Finance and professional orientation ====
The growing centrality of finance goes hand in hand with the rise of business schools, which employ an increasingly large share of economists and occupy a growing place in top journals, while authors affiliated with public institutions become less common. Symbolically, this shifts the intellectual and political centre of gravity of the profession towards the world of business, with greater support for the private sector, deregulation, and limits on public intervention, and it fuels the idea of a partial convergence between the interests of the profession and those of finance, which may help explain changes in economists’ political stances. In this context, scholars also describe a “fix-it” culture among economists: a strong confidence in their ability to propose solutions and correct malfunctions, relying on tools they regard as effective and scientific. This suggests that this influence can reinforce the higher status often accorded to economists, while also leaving them particularly exposed in the public arena: in times of crisis, they are among the first to be questioned and blamed.

==== Influence in the state ====
Some authors report a paradox in this diagnosis of the “superiority” of economists. From the outside, as mentioned, economists appear as the most powerful social science within the state: decision-makers have grown accustomed to turning to their expertise, and economists occupy key positions in central banks, ministries of finance, international organisations and advisory councils. They are widely perceived as the experts who “really understand” the economy, including by the general public. But from the inside, many economists feel that their influence is not so substantial and appears to them to be highly constrained: in high-stakes policy debates (the euro crisis, climate policy, welfare state reform), partisan conflicts and institutional interests often prevail over expert advice, even when economists broadly agree among themselves. Symbolic and material supremacy can translate into policy influence through three main channels: the high level of professional authority economics enjoys, which makes it a natural point of reference when “the economy” is at stake; economists occupying strategic positions inside the state and international organisations, so that in some domains they are not just advisers but direct decision-makers; and economics shaping the cognitive infrastructure of policymaking, as economic modes of reasoning (incentives, efficiency, growth, cost–benefit trade-offs) and technical tools (indicators, models, evaluation procedures) diffuse beyond the profession and structure how non-economist officials see and frame problems.

==== Scientization of policy advice ====
The rising influence of economists in decision-making spheres goes hand in hand with a broader trend: the “scientization” of policy advice. This is described as the third major trend, adding to externalization (the increasing reliance on actors outside the traditional civil service) and politicization (stronger partisan control over advice and greater use of political advisers). In this context, it refers to the growing dependence of decision-makers on academic experts and on arguments explicitly presented as scientific. In the field of economic policy, this means that governments turn more systematically to academic economists and that commission reports are increasingly grounded in economic research, rather than solely in bureaucratic experience or stakeholder input.

Within this broader trend, economics has been especially well positioned. First, its abstract, mathematical formalism, which brings it closer to a hard science, gives it a rational, scientific and objective appeal. Second, in the post-war period, economics presents itself as a general technique of government, not only competent in the realm of “pure” economics, but also as a producer of tools that can be transposed to a wide range of public policy domains, from labour markets to pensions, and from climate regulation to healthcare. Finally, the strong internal hierarchy of the profession provides its own clearly identified instances of validation (top departments and journals), which serves to legitimize and boost the credibility of economics, giving its policy recommendations the appearance of a scientific consensus. For these reasons, decision-makers tend to turn to economists when they seek “scientific” justifications for their policies.

However, public policy advice should not be reduced to academic economics alone. A citation analysis shows that commission reports continue to draw on a mixed knowledge base: alongside articles in international journals, they frequently cite national policy documents, studies produced by central banks and statistical offices, as well as applied research carried out by public agencies. Scientization thus adds an academic layer rather than replacing other forms of knowledge. It has also been shown that scientization can fulfil both an instrumental and a legitimating function.

==== Technocracy and limits ====
As a performative field, much of economists’ political influence is indirect. Economists rarely “impose” policies on elected officials. They design concepts, metrics and decision tools, what authors call the cognitive and technical infrastructure of policy, that become embedded in bureaucratic routines. Devices such as GDP, unemployment rates, cost–benefit analysis, or auction rules narrow the range of options that appear reasonable and make some trade-offs visible while hiding others. This contributes to a form of economic technocracy: many key choices are framed as technical and delegated to experts, even though the underlying assumptions are normative and contestable. On the limits of this technocracy: economists are most influential in ill-defined or technical issues and in the early stages of agenda-setting, and much less so when conflicts become highly politicised.

A clear illustration of how neoliberal reform can extend beyond macroeconomic policy and into institutional design can be observed in Chile under Pinochet. Reforms associated with the “Chicago Boys” (economists trained in the Chicago tradition who advised the regime) also reshaped higher education through market viability. The rapid expansion of private schools, the concentration of programs in commercially valued fields (law, engineering, accountancy, commerce, management,...), and the marginalization of humanities illustrate how reforms framed as technical and modernizing can embed market principles into public infrastructures, reshaping both educational supply and who gains access.

=== Social composition, values and public image ===
Economics as a discipline is heavily male-dominated, compared with many other social sciences, and its practitioners also tend to come from relatively higher social strata.

Economists form a professional group with a distinctive profile, whether in their behaviour, their political views, their social position, or their relationship to power. Like much of the academic world, they tend to place themselves somewhat to the left of centre, but on average they are less interventionist than their colleagues and appear to have a particular relationship to individual self-interest. It is difficult, however, to determine whether this relationship is produced by economic training itself, or whether individuals already more oriented towards self-interest are simply more likely to choose economics in the first place.

Their views are often out of step with those of the general public, for example in their support for market-based mechanisms to address social issues (such as paying organ donors, or using carbon taxes). Their relative material comfort tends to widen the social distance that separates them from other groups, which raises questions given that economists occupy important positions at the heart of decision-making structures, and that their discipline is closely linked to public administrations and large organizations.

== Notable economists ==
Some current well-known economists include:

- Adam Smith, Scottish economist and philosopher. Known as "The Father of Economics".
- John Maynard Keynes, English economist well known for forming the basis of Keynesian economics.
- Jan Tinbergen, Dutch economist known for developing and applying dynamic models for the analysis of economic processes, which led to the establishment of econometrics. He was awarded the first Nobel Memorial Prize in Economic Sciences in 1969.
- Ragnar Frisch, Norwegian economist who coined the term econometrics in 1926 for utilising statistical methods to describe economic systems. He was awarded the first Nobel Memorial Prize in Economic Sciences in 1969.
- Joan Robinson, English Keynesian economist.
- Karl Marx, German philosopher and economist known for founding Marxist Economics.
- Amartya Sen (b. 1933), Nobel Memorial Prize in Economic Sciences laureate and professor at Harvard University.
- Kenneth Arrow, Nobel Memorial Prize in Economic Sciences laureate and professor at Stanford University.
- Robert Aumann (b. 1930), Israeli-American mathematician, Nobel Memorial Prize in Economics in 2005.
- B. R. Ambedkar, Indian scholar, jurist, economist, politician and social reformer. The Reserve Bank of India was conceptualized in accordance with the guidelines presented by Ambedkar to the Hilton Young Commission (also known as Royal Commission on Indian Currency and Finance) based on his book, The Problem of the Rupee – Its Origin and Its Solution.
- Ben Bernanke, Chairman of the Federal Reserve from 2006 to 2014.
- Esther Duflo, Nobel Memorial Prize in Economic Sciences laureate and professor at Massachusetts Institute of Technology.
- Milton Friedman, Nobel Memorial Prize in Economic Sciences laureate.
- Claudia Goldin, Nobel Memorial Prize in Economic Sciences laureate and professor at Harvard University.
- Alan Greenspan, Chairman of the Federal Reserve from 1987 to 2006.
- James Heckman, 2000 Nobel Prize winner and Professor at University of Chicago; most cited economist as of 2018.
- Glenn Hubbard, Dean of the Columbia University Graduate School of Business; Chair of the Council of Economic Advisers from 2001 to 2003.
- Thomas M. Humphrey, American economist and historian of economic thought.
- Paul Krugman, 2008 Nobel Memorial Prize in Economic Sciences laureate, public intellectual, and advocate of modern liberal policies.
- Greg Mankiw, American macroeconomist, academic economist, public intellectual, Chair of the Council of Economic Advisers from 2003 to 2005.
- Joseph Stiglitz, 2001 Nobel Memorial Prize in Economics winner, critic of inequality and the governance of globalization, and former World Bank Chief Economist.
- Dambisa Moyo, Zambian-born international economist and author who analyzes the macroeconomy and global affairs.
- Thomas Sowell, American economist and social theorist, Senior Fellow at the Hoover Institution.
- Robert Lucas Jr., 1995 Nobel Prize in Economics winner.
- George Akerlof, 2001 Nobel Memorial Prize in Economics Sciences winner, known for his work on markets with asymmetric information.
- Carmen Reinhart, member of American Economic Association, 2018 King Juan Carlos Prize in Economics winner.
- William Forsyth Sharpe, 1990 Nobel Memorial Prize in Economic Sciences winner.
- Christopher Antoniou Pissarides, 2010 Nobel Prize in Economics winner.
- Arthur Laffer, 2019 Presidential Medal of Freedom winner.
- Jeffrey Sachs, Professor of Sustainable Development at Columbia's School of International and Public Affairs, 2015 Blue Planet Prize winner.
- Ludwig von Mises, Austrian economist and philosopher, author of Human Action.
- Friedrich Hayek, Austrian economist, Nobel Memorial Prize in Economic Sciences laureate and author of The Road to Serfdom.
- Thomas Malthus (1766-1834), English economist, cleric, and scholar influential in the fields of political economy and demography.
- David Ricardo (1772-1823), developed the classical theory of comparative advantage in 1817.
- Henry George (1839-1897), American economist, social philosopher, journalist, and leader of the single-tax movement.
- Silvio Gesell (1862-1930), German economist, entrepreneur, and founder of Freiwirtschaft economic model.
- Jean-Baptiste Say, developed Say's law stating that a free economy could not know economic crises.
- Ronald Coase, founder of the concept of transaction cost.

== See also ==
- Chief economist
- List of economists
