= Aitor Fernández (footballer, born 1986) =

Spanish footballer

Aitor
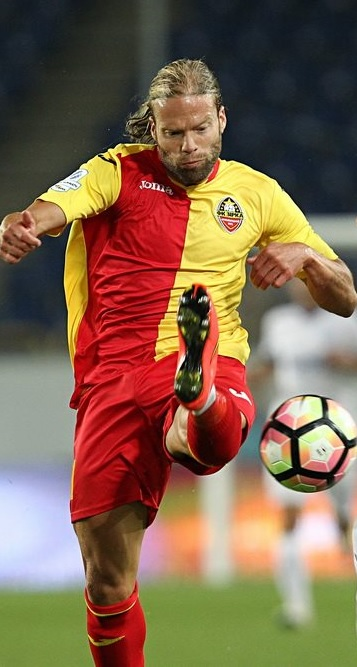
- Aitor with Zirka in 2016

Personal information
- Full name: Aitor Fernández López
- Date of birth: 23 August 1986 (age 40)
- Place of birth: Valdepares, Spain
- Height: 1.81 m (5 ft 11 in)
- Position: Right-back

Youth career
- Racing Santander

Senior career*
Years	Team	Apps	(Gls)
2005–2008	Racing B	39	(1)
2008	→ Ponferradina (loan)	12	(0)
2008–2009	Ponferradina	30	(0)
2009–2010	Espanyol B	26	(0)
2010–2011	Pontevedra	31	(1)
2011–2012	Lugo	31	(0)
2012–2013	Guadalajara	41	(1)
2013–2014	Hércules	16	(0)
2014–2015	Mirandés	36	(0)
2015	Mumbai City	4	(0)
2016	Avilés	0	(0)
2016	Zirka	8	(0)
2017–2019	Extremadura	54	(3)
2019–2021	Cultural Leonesa	21	(0)
Total		349	(6)
- * Club domestic league appearances and goals

Aitor Fernández López (born 23 August 1986), known simply as Aitor, is a Spanish former professional footballer who played as a right-back.

== Club career ==
Born in Valdepares, Asturias, Aitor began his career with Racing de Santander, but only appeared for the reserves during his spell with the club. He also served a loan stint at SD Ponferradina, and joined the Segunda División B side permanently in 2008.

In the summer of 2009, Aitor signed for RCD Espanyol, but again only featured with the B team also in the third division. After a sole season, he moved to another club in that tier, Pontevedra CF.

Aitor signed for CD Lugo – yet in the third tier – in July 2011, being first choice as the campaign ended in promotion. On 19 July 2012, he agreed to a two-year contract with CD Guadalajara.

Aitor made his Segunda División debut on 19 August 2012, playing the full 90 minutes in a 1–1 away draw against AD Alcorcón. He scored his first goal as a professional on 22 September, but in a 3–4 home loss to Real Madrid Castilla.

After suffering relegation, Aitor represented Hércules CF and CD Mirandés, both in the second division. On 15 September 2015, the 29-year-old moved abroad for the first time in his career, joining Indian Super League team Mumbai City FC.

On returning from Asia, Aitor signed in May 2016 for Real Avilés Industrial CF of his home region ahead of their participation in the Tercera División play-offs. Following their elimination, he moved on to FC Zirka Kropyvnytskyi of the Ukrainian First League.

At the end of the January 2017 transfer window, Aitor returned to Spain and joined struggling Extremadura UD. He played regularly in his first full season, as the club won promotion to the second division for the first time in its history.

Aitor signed with third-tier Cultural y Deportiva Leonesa on 28 August 2019, after terminating his contract.

== Career statistics ==
Appearances and goals by club, season and competition
Club	Season	League			National Cup		Other		Total	
Club	Season	Division	Apps	Goals	Apps	Goals	Apps	Goals	Apps	Goals
Racing B	2005–06	Segunda División B	36	1	—		—		36	1
Racing B	2006–07	Segunda División B	3	0	—		—		3	0
Racing B	Total		39	1	0	0	0	0	39	1
Ponferradina (loan)	2007–08	Segunda División B	12	0	0	0	—		12	0
Ponferradina	2008–09	Segunda División B	30	0	5	0	2 (Note: Appearances in Segunda División B play-offs)	0	37	0
Ponferradina	Total		42	0	5	0	2	0	49	0
Espanyol B	2009–10	Segunda División B	26	0	—		—		26	0
Pontevedra	2010–11	Segunda División B	31	1	1	0	—		32	1
Lugo	2011–12	Segunda División B	31	0	1	0	6	0	38	0
Guadalajara	2012–13	Segunda División	41	1	0	0	—		41	1
Hércules	2013–14	Segunda División	16	0	2	0	—		18	0
Mirandés	2014–15	Segunda División	36	0	1	0	—		37	0
Mumbai City	2015	Indian Super League	4	0	—		—		4	0
Avilés	2015–16	Tercera División	?	?	—		—		0	0
Zirka	2016–17	Ukrainian Premier League	8	0	1	0	—		9	0
Extremadura	2016–17	Segunda División B	15	1	0	0	—		15	1
Extremadura	2017–18	Segunda División B	27	2	0	0	6	0	33	2
Extremadura	2018–19	Segunda División	12	0	1	0	—		13	0
Extremadura	2019–20	Segunda División	0	0	0	0	—		0	0
Extremadura	Total		54	3	1	0	6	0	61	3
Cultural Leonesa	2019–20	Segunda División B	21	0	4	0	2	0	27	0
Cultural Leonesa	2020–21	Segunda División B	0	0	0	0	—		0	0
Cultural Leonesa	Total		21	0	4	0	2	0	27	0
Career total			349	6	16	0	16	0	381	6
