= San Xuan de Prendonés =

San Xuan de Prendones
- Parish
- Location within Spain
- Coordinates: 43°32′38″N 6°52′17″W
- Country: Spain
- Autonomous community: Asturias
- Province: Asturias
- Municipality: El Franco

San Xuan de Prendones is a parish (administrative division) in the municipality of El Franco, within the province and autonomous community of Asturias, in northern Spain.

The population is 293 (INE 2007).

== Villages ==
- Arbedeiras
- Boimouro
- Carbexe
- El Llouredal
- Nenín
- Prendonés
- A Rebollada
- Sueiro
- San Xuan
- Zarredo
