= Folgueiras =

- Parish
- Location within Spain
- Coordinates: 43°32′N 6°45′W
- Country: Spain
- Autonomous community: Asturias
- Province: Asturias
- Municipality: Cuaña

Folgueiras (Spanish: Folgueras) is one of seven parishes (administrative divisions) in the Cuaña municipality, within the province and autonomous community of Asturias, in northern Spain.

The population is 803 (INE 2007).

== Villages ==
- Abredo
- Ansilán
- Barqueiros
- El Espín
- Folgueiras
- Xarrio
- El Esfreita
- Meiro
- Torce
