= Llebredo =

- Parish
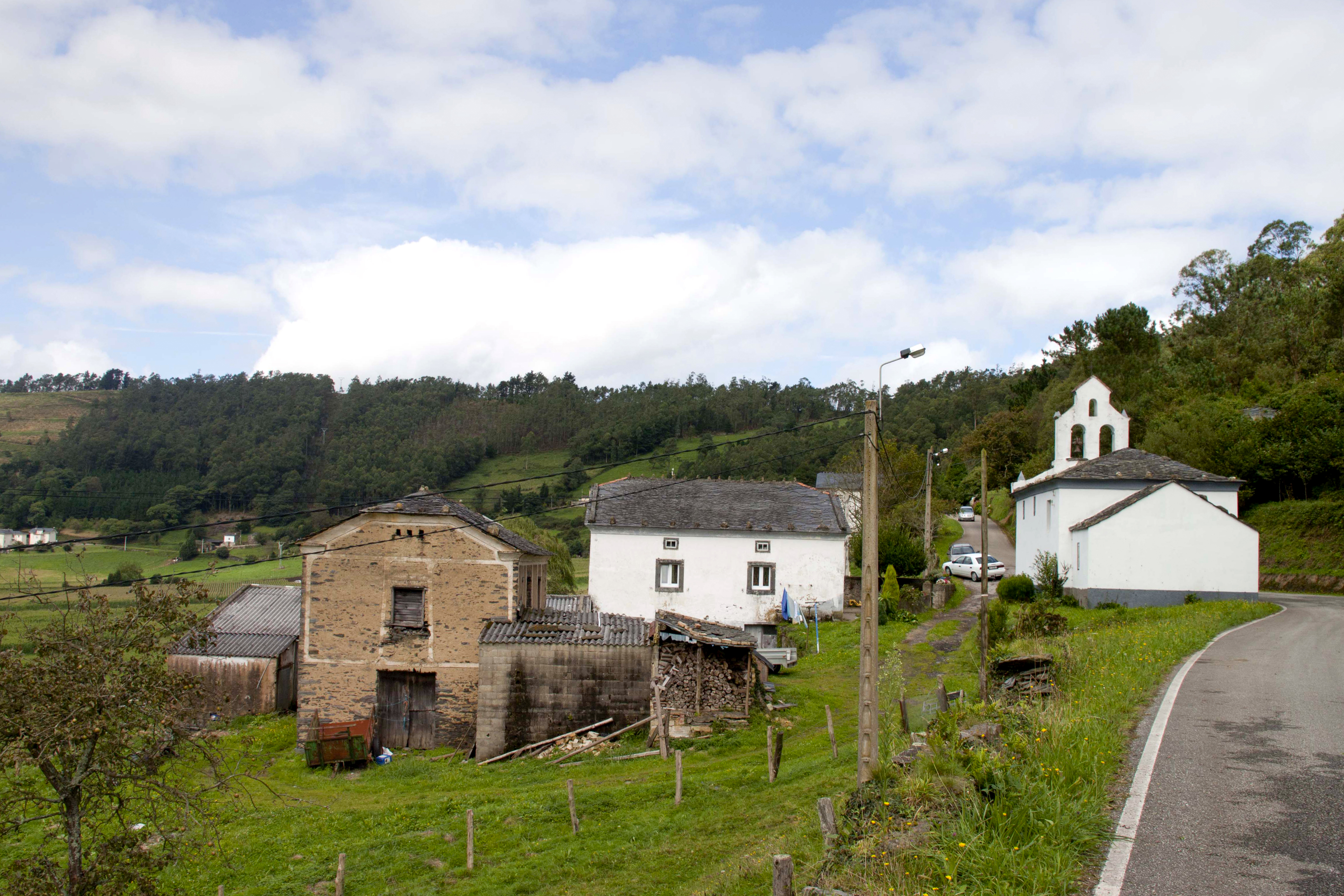

- Location within Spain
- Coordinates: 43°29′4″N 6°49′12″W
- Country: Spain
- Autonomous community: Asturias
- Province: Asturias
- Municipality: El Franco; Cuaña; Boal

Llebredo (Spanish: Lebredo) is a parish in the municipalities of Boal, Cuaña, and El Franco, within the province and autonomous community of Asturias, in northern Spain.

The population is 98 (INE 2007). The postal codes are 33719 and 33756.

== Villages ==
- Brañamayor
- Cova
- Llebredo
