= Joaquim Muns =

Spanish politician, teacher and economist (1935-2015)

Joaquim Muns Albuixech
- Born: June 25, 1935; Barcelona, Spain
- Died: November 2, 2015 (aged 80)
- Education: University of Barcelona
- Occupations: Economist, Lawyer, Professor
- Known for: International economics, Law

Joaquim Muns Albuixech (born June 25, 1935, in Barcelona – November 2, 2015) was a Catalan economist and lawyer.

== Biography ==
He graduated in Law and Economics from the University of Barcelona in 1959, and obtained his Ph.D. in Economics in 1972. He pursued further studies at the London School of Economics. He was a professor of economic theory at the Escola Superior d'Administració i Direcció d'Empreses (ESADE), an economics professor (1968–1973), and a professor of International Economic Organization (1973–1978) at the Faculty of Economics and Business of the University of Barcelona.

Since 1965, he conducted research and specialized in economic issues related to Latin America, especially after his involvement with the International Monetary Fund, where he served as an economist from 1965 to 1968 and as executive director from 1978 to 1980. Among other positions, he was an adjunct professor at the School of International Service at American University in Washington. He was also an adjunct professor at the International Monetary Institute, economic advisor to the Ministry of Economy of Spain and the governments of Ecuador and the Generalitat de Catalunya. He also advised the governments of Costa Rica, Venezuela, Nicaragua, and Mexico, among others.

He was elected as a Member of the European Parliament for CiU in the European elections and was part of the European Liberal Group.

He has authored numerous books and articles, primarily on international economics, and in 1984, he was awarded the Creu de Sant Jordi. In 1987, he was elected to the Institute for Catalan Studies. In 1994, he was appointed as a member of the Board of the Bank of Spain, a position he held until 2005, being replaced by Guillem López Casasnovas, as part of the "Catalan quota." In 1995, he received the award from the Catalan Foundation for Research. In 2008, he received the King of Spain Prize in Economics. In 2011, along with Alfredo Pastor, he was awarded the Conde de Godó Journalism Prize.

== Works ==
- Industrialization and Growth in Developing Countries (1972)
- Estudio sobre la distribución de funcionas especialmente las de naturaleza económica lo marco de una autonomía regional: aplicaciones a Cataluña (1978)
- Muns, Joaquín (1986). Historia de las relaciones entre España y el Fondo Monetario Internacional 1958-1982: veinticinco años de economía española (in Spanish). Alianza. ISBN 978-84-206-9030-8
- Euro y globalización: los grandes retos de la economía española (1999). ISBN 978-84-316-4779-7
- Albuixech, Joaquim Muns; Muns, Joaquín (2005-10-27). Lecturas de integración económica (3a edic.). La Unión Europea (in Spanish). Edicions Universitat Barcelona. ISBN 978-84-475-2973-5
