= A Caridá =

- Parish
- Location within Spain
- Country: Spain
- Autonomous community: Asturias
- Province: Asturias
- Municipality: El Franco

A Caridá (Spanish: La Caridad) is one of eight parishes (administrative divisions) in the El Franco municipality, within the province and autonomous community of Asturias, in northern Spain.

The population is 1,796 (INE 2007).

== Villages ==
- Arboces
- Llóngara
- El Porto/Viavélez
