= Corín Tellado =

Spanish writer (1927-2009)

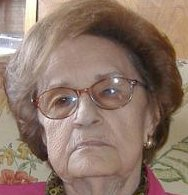
- Corín Tellado in 2008
- Born: María del Socorro Tellado López; 25 April 1927; El Franco, Asturias, Spain
- Died: 11 April 2009 (aged 81); Gijón, Asturias, Spain
- Occupation: Novelist
- Writing career
- Pen name: Corín Tellado; Ada Miller Leswy; Ada Miller
- Period: 1945–2009
- Genre: romance novel
- Website: www.corintellado.com

María del Socorro Tellado López (25 April 1927 in El Franco, Asturias, Spain – 11 April 2009), known as Corín Tellado, was a Spanish writer of romantic novels and photonovels that were best-sellers in several Spanish-language countries. She published more than 4,000 titles and sold more than 400 million books which have been translated into several languages. She was listed in the 1994 Guinness World Records as having sold the most books written in Spanish, and earlier in 1962 UNESCO declared her the most read Spanish writer after Miguel de Cervantes.

Her novels differed from other works in that she did not use eroticism, due to the Spanish regime's strict censorship. Her style was direct and her characters were simply presented. These novels have inspired several telenovelas.

== Biography ==
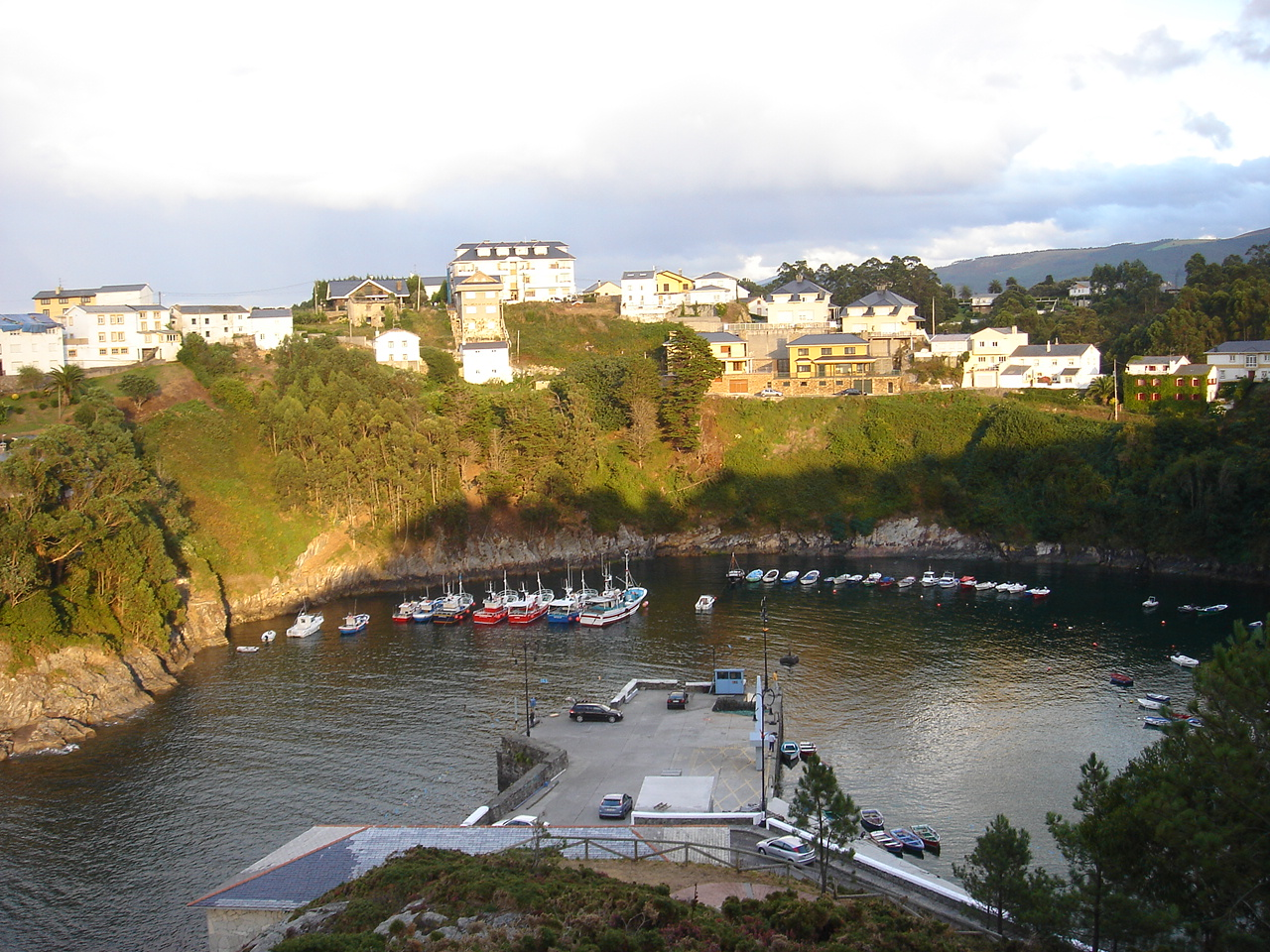
Viavelez, El Franco

María del Socorro Tellado López was born in the village of Viavélez, and she was the only girl of five siblings. Her mother was a housewife and her father was a naval mechanic in the Merchant Navy.

In 1939, after the Spanish Civil War, her father was promoted to First Officer and the whole family moved to Cádiz. Her love for literature began when she attended a catholic school which was run by nuns.

Her father died in 1945 and the family started to have economic problems; she sold her first novel, Atrevida apuesta, to the publishing house Editorial Bruguera in 1946 for 3,000 pesetas, but they rejected her second novel. She continued to write for and to be published by Editorial Cies and Editorial Bruguera; she also started to study psychology, but did not finish her studies because Editorial Bruguera contracted her to write one short novel every week. In 1948 she went back to Asturias with her mother, where she started publishing a different short novella every two weeks in Latin American magazine Vanidades. She claimed that she was able to write a short novel in two days.

She married Domingo Egusquizaga Sangroniz in 1959 in Covadonga and one year later she gave birth to her first child, her daughter Begoña Egusquizaga Tellado; in 1961 she gave birth to her second child, her son Domingo Egusquizaga Tellado. In 1962, the couple separated, but never divorced.

In 1962 UNESCO declared her the most read Spanish writer after Miguel de Cervantes, and Editorial Bruguera offered her an exclusive contract to write. She would later have problems with Editorial Bruguera, because they republished some of her novels under a different title without her permission. She started to write for Editorial Rollán, but in 1973 Editorial Bruguera filed a lawsuit against her and won, and she had to pay them compensation, in addition to returning to work for them. Her last works for Editorial Buguera were erotic novels under the pen name of Ada Leswy or Ada Miller Leswy.

She also published some children's books in collaboration with Jesús Zantón Santiago, and her favorite novel was Lucha oculta (1991), her first long work.

Corín Tellado was listed in the 1994 Guinness World Records as having sold the most books written in Spanish.

She died on 11 April 2009 in her home as a result of a stroke. She left three unpublished novels. Her novels continue to be reedited in digital format.

== Selected bibliography ==
Not included are her short stories for magazines.

=== As Corín Tellado ===
==== Single novels ====
- Atrevida apuesta (1946)
- Boda clandestina (1947)
- Era el amor (1949)
- Incomprensión (1949)
- La hija de mi jefe = Diablillo (1949)
- La isla dorada (1949)
- Nos venció el amor (1949)
- Semilla de odio (1949)
- ¡Guerra al amor! (1950)
- ¡Porque no eres como todos! (1950)
- ¡Si yo coqueteara! (1950)
- Alma (1950)
- Cupido se burló de Mari-Dena (1950)
- Entre dos luces (1950)
- Irene tienta al misántropo (1950)
- Lo hice por tu amor (1950)
- Sucedió callando (1950)
- Timidez y pasión (1950)
- Tristeza de amar (1950)
- ¡Bendita seas! (1951)
- ¿Quién tuvo la culpa? (1951)
- Corazón indómito (1951)
- Desdeño ese amor (1951)
- Después de aquella noche... (1951)
- Destinos de amor (1951)
- Él era así (1951)
- Matrimonio por seis meses (1951)
- Mi novio, el afilador (1951)
- Renuncio a tu perdón (1951)
- Si no fueras tú... (1951)
- Tú eres el culpable (1951)
- Tuyo es mi corazón (1951)
- Volverás a mí (1951)
- ¡Aquella muchacha! (1952)
- ¡Tú no eres nadie! (1952)
- Alix Efimovich (1952)
- De distinto color (1952)
- El destino manda (1952)
- Ella entre los dos (1952)
- Eres mi esposa (1952)
- Éste es mi quinto (1952)
- Isabel (1952)
- Más allá de la senda (1952)
- No pensé en mí (1952)
- Otra mujer en su vida (1952)
- Una mujer fea (1952)
- ¿Cuál de los cuatro? (1953)
- Dos almas recias (1953)
- El destino tiene la palabra (1953)
- La noche trajo un amor (1953)
- Me casaré contigo (1953)
- Una chica decidida (1953)
- Una mujer ambiciosa (1953)
- Compraré un marido (1954)
- Dos rostros y una mujer (1954)
- El desengaño de Nancy (1954)
- El pasado no es nuestro (1954)
- Frívola (1954)
- La mujer de mi amigo (1954)
- Leonor (1954)
- Loco corazón (1954)
- No soy lo que piensas (1954)
- Su gran delito (1954)
- Tengo otro amor (1954)
- Un soltero peligroso (1954)
- Una novia para dos (1954)
- ¡Malditos besos! (1955)
- Almas gemelas (1955)
- Deliciosa locura (1955)
- Había renunciado (1955)
- La boda de Ivonne (1955)
- La colegiala (1955)
- La maestra (1955)
- Quiero tu amor (1955)
- Raíces de pecado (1955)
- Un hombre y una mujer (1955)
- ¿Quieres ser mi mujer? (1956)
- De otra raza (1956)
- El pasado de Mauri (1956)
- Ella era así (1956)
- La molinera (1956)
- Matrimonio obligado (1956)
- Te quiero de esta manera (1956)
- Timidez y amor (1956)
- Una chica loca (1956)
- Yira (1956)
- Casémonos (1957)
- El marido de Laura (1957)
- El primer beso = Su primer suspiro (1957)
- El recuerdo de aquel día (1957)
- Estamos casados (1957)
- Historia de dos mujeres (1957)
- La mentira de Sofía (1957)
- La novia de mi hermano (1957)
- La rebelde Cris (1957)
- Mi secretaria (1957)
- Parecía imposible (1957)
- Su Majestad la Reina (1957)
- Aquel matrimonio... (1958)
- Casada por poderes (1958)
- El complejo de Mary-Chon (1958)
- Flor María (1958)
- He vuelto para ti (1958)
- Helen se divierte (1958)
- Inesperadamente (1958)
- La imagen de una mujer (1958)
- La máscara de una mujer (1958)
- La modelo (1958)
- Llegó la colegiala (1958)
- Lucha oculta (1958)
- Matrimonio singular (1958)
- No puedo creer en ti (1958)
- Pasaje de una vida (1958)
- Realidad de una vida (1958)
- Tras el olvido (1958)
- Tuviste que ser mía (1958)
- Aquel minuto (1959)
- Caprichos de millonario (1959)
- Deseo un millonario (1959)
- El caso de la maestra (1959)
- El castillo de Wiertel (1959)
- El destino esperaba allí (1959)
- El orgullo de Milady (1959)
- El problema de Sara (1959)
- En pos de la fortuna (1959)
- La encontré en mi camino (1959)
- La historia de una mujer (1959)
- La inquieta Ana (1959)
- La invitada (1959)
- La mujer de hielo (1959)
- La sombra de otro amor (1959)
- Las inquietudes de Patricia (1959)
- Me casé con un celoso (1959)
- Mi marido y yo (1959)
- Mi querida rebelde (1959)
- Nereyda (1959)
- No te separes de mí (1959)
- Orgullo de raza (1959)
- Perdidos en la niebla (1959)
- Su Alteza ha llegado (1959)
- Un doble para Patricia (1959)
- Un solo hombre (1959)
- Una llamada a la puerta (1959)
- Una mamá para Ana (1959)
- Yo soy aquella chica (1959)
- Adorable esclavitud (1960)
- Andrés y ellas (1960)
- Desengaño y amor (1960)
- El matrimonio de Myriam (1960)
- El padrino de mi hermano (1960)
- El papá de Sallie (1960)
- El pasado vuelve aquí (1960)
- El profesor de felicidad (1960)
- El secreto de Mildred (1960)
- Ella y sus recuerdos (1960)
- Has de ser tú (1960)
- La doncella de mamá (1960)
- La historia de mi vida (1960)
- Los ambiciosos (1960)
- Milady y los hombres (1960)
- Realidades (1960)
- Te vi al amanecer (1960)
- Tú eres para mí (1960)
- Un consuelo para ti (1960)
- Un marido por apuesta (1960)
- Una chica valiente (1960)
- Aquel descubrimiento (1961)
- Carla (1961)
- En aquel momento (1961)
- La cautiva (1961)
- Las dudas de Celia (1961)
- Mag se ha enamorado (1961)
- Me casé ayer (1961)
- Me casé con él (1961)
- Mis pretendientes (1961)
- Prometida a la fuerza (1961)
- Raquel, no esperes (1961)
- Se busca esposa (1961)
- Ten cuidado, Irene (1961)
- Un marido para Berta (1961)
- ¿Es éste mi marido? (1962)
- Aquel hombre y yo (1962)
- Aquella extraña boda (1962)
- Arturo y mi hermana (1962)
- Beatriz (1962)
- El amigo de mi marido (1962)
- El amor llegó más tarde (1962)
- El señor feudal (1962)
- Él y el otro (1962)
- Ella volverá (1962)
- Elvira no reflexiona (1962)
- Fuego en la nieve (1962)
- Futuro incierto (1962)
- Lo supe aquel día (1962)
- María Eugenia (1962)
- Marta y ellos (1962)
- No era espejismo (1962)
- No estás sola (1962)
- Susana piensa (1962)
- Te presento a mi marido (1962)
- Un secreto entre los dos (1962)
- ¿Qué quieres de mí? (1963)
- Adorada mía (1963)
- Aléjate de mí (1963)
- Algún día volveré (1963)
- Amor fugaz (1963)
- Ana y el chófer (1963)
- Berta (1963)
- Cambio feliz (1963)
- Casado por ambición (1963)
- Cree en mí (1963)
- Cumplí mi condena (1963)
- Cumplimiento de palabra (1963)
- Déjame adorarte, Isabel (1963)
- Déjame decírtelo (1963)
- El destino la esperaba (1963)
- El destino no perdona (1963)
- El drama de Maylen (1963)
- El maestro (1963)
- El matrimonio de Grey (1963)
- El secreto de Ana (1963)
- Ella y su jefe (1963)
- En aquel valle (1963)
- Entre marido y mujer (1963)
- Eres el mismo (1963)
- Espero un marido rico (1963)
- La boda de Anita (1963)
- La destino la esperaba (1963)
- La prometida de Clint (1963)
- Las dos familias (1963)
- Las noches de Audrey (1963)
- Lo encontré así (1963)
- Lo sabía (1963)
- Los gemelos (1963)
- Maricé tiene novio (1963)
- Misterio inexistente (1963)
- No creo en tu cariño (1963)
- No debo quererte (1963)
- No puedo odiarte (1963)
- Obligada esclavitud (1963)
- Odio a mi cuñado (1963)
- Odio en la aldea (1963)
- Ojos bonitos (1963)
- Olvídalo (1963)
- Orgullo sin venganza (1963)
- Perdóname (1963)
- Siempre fue así (1963)
- Sin compromiso (1963)
- Sólo supe quererte (1963)
- Susana (1963)
- Te amo (1963)
- Te casarás conmigo (1963)
- Te haré feliz (1963)
- Una oscura promesa (1963)
- Volveremos a encontrarnos (1963)
- Yo no tengo la culpa (1963)
- «In articulo mortis» (1964)
- ...Y llegó ella (1964)
- Adiós, Susana (1964)
- Ahora no te quiero (1964)
- Aquella calumnia (1964)
- Aventura inesperada (1964)
- Como me lo contaron (1964)
- Deja que te ame (1964)
- Dudas (1964)
- El destino de una huída (1964)
- Empezó sin querer (1964)
- Empieza ahora (1964)
- Encontré a mi mujer (1964)
- Felicidad (1964)
- Inquietudes (1964)
- La encontré por ser celoso (1964)
- Luz roja para el amor (1964)
- Mi adorada pueblerina (1964)
- Mi boda contigo (1964)
- Mi esposo me abandona (1964)
- Mi frívola esposa (1964)
- Mi mala intención (1964)
- Mi marido me olvidó (1964)
- No eres tú (1964)
- No permitas que te ofenda (1964)
- No quiero volver a verte (1964)
- No quisiera amarte (1964)
- No seas orgulloso (1964)
- No soy aquella mujer (1964)
- No te enamores, muchacha (1964)
- No te juzgo (1964)
- No te vi (1964)
- Nos casaremos (1964)
- Olvídame, Paula (1964)
- Orgullo y soberbia (1964)
- Otra vez contigo (1964)
- Papá y su novia (1964)
- Por compasión, no (1964)
- Querida Edith (1964)
- Recuerdo perdurable (1964)
- Sin piedad (1964)
- Su Alteza Real (1964)
- Surgió el amor (1964)
- Te defiendo sin amor (1964)
- Te encontré para esto (1964)
- Un contrato original (1964)
- Volveré aquí (1964)
- La esposa de mi hermano (1964)
- Ardiente sacrificio (1965)
- Ayúdame a olvidar (1965)
- Destruyeme después (1965)
- El destino viajaba en tren (1965)
- El doloroso ayer (1965)
- El novio de mi vecina (1965)
- El peso de tu personalidad (1965)
- Eres una aventurera (1965)
- Me dejaste injustamente (1965)
- Me inquietó tu boda (1965)
- Mi marido y sus hijos (1965)
- Mónica en apuros (1965)
- No me compadezcas (1965)
- No me odies (1965)
- Nos conocimos así (1965)
- Odiosa esclavitud (1965)
- Orgullo y ternura (1965)
- Problema familiar (1965)
- Secreto matrimonial (1965)
- Soy un soltero feliz (1965)
- Te amo, Edgar (1965)
- Tú me diste la felicidad (1965)
- Un hombre ante mi puerta (1965)
- Vengo a pagar mi deuda (1965)
- Altiva muchacha (1966)
- Amor en las cumbres (1966)
- Ayúdame tú (1966)
- Barreras para el amor (1966)
- El fantasma de sí mismo (1966)
- El padre de mis sobrinos (1966)
- El pecado de Sofía (1966)
- Elige tu camino (1966)
- Me llamaste aquel día (1966)
- Me ofenden tus celos (1966)
- Me olvidaste al otro día (1966)
- Mi felicidad eres tú (1966)
- Mi marido me espera (1966)
- No eres buena (1966)
- No puedo ser para ti (1966)
- Nos casamos por amor (1966)
- Por eso me casé contigo (1966)
- Por quererla tanto soy así (1966)
- Pudo más que el orgullo (1966)
- Quiéreme a mí (1966)
- Su noviazgo fue así (1966)
- Te prefiero a ti (1966)
- Tú la querrás más (1966)
- Vamos a casarnos los dos (1966)
- Y eligió la felicidad (1966)
- Ahora no te voy a olvidar (1967)
- Conmigo olvidarás tu pasado (1967)
- Dime si eres ella (1967)
- El compromiso de Ana (1967)
- El pasado de Tab North (1967)
- Esta mujer es mía (1967)
- He venido engañada (1967)
- He vuelto para verte (1967)
- Inquietante intimidad (1967)
- La sombra de un recuerdo (1967)
- Las tinieblas de mi vida (1967)
- Le destrozaste la vida (1967)
- Me callé por no dañarte (1967)
- Mi querido fanfarrón (1967)
- No me humilles así (1967)
- No mereces mi perdón (1967)
- No olvidaré tu traición (1967)
- No podía casarme con él (1967)
- No puedo ser tu marido (1967)
- Olvida mi venganza (1967)
- Olvídate de aquel día (1967)
- Por eso fui a buscarte (1967)
- Quiéreme y olvídala (1967)
- Quiero casarme con ella (1967)
- Siempre estuve así (1967)
- Te ayudaré siempre (1967)
- Te eligió mi corazón (1967)
- Te equivocaste conmigo (1967)
- Te odio por ser de otro (1967)
- Tu pecado me condena (1967)
- Una noche en el balcón (1967)
- Vengas en mí tu dolor (1967)
- Ya me llamarás (1967)
- Almas inquietas (1968)
- Aquella ilusión desvanecida (1968)
- Aventurera (1968)
- Bendita equivocación (1968)
- Descúbreme ese misterio (1968)
- Detén mi caída (1968)
- El problema de Luima (1968)
- Esperaba por ti (1968)
- Las inquietudes de Cristina (1968)
- Lastimas con tu tortura (1968)
- Me estas abandonando (1968)
- Me estoy acostumbrando (1968)
- Me obligaron a casarme (1968)
- Me sentía sola (1968)
- Me siento decepcionada (1968)
- Negocio matrimonial (1968)
- No me basta tu ternura (1968)
- No me obligues a decirlo (1968)
- No te cases por piedad (1968)
- No te engañes a ti misma (1968)
- No te quería (1968)
- No traté de engañarte (1968)
- Soy poco para ti (1968)
- Tu marido está aquí (1968)
- Tu noche de boda (1968)
- Ya sé cómo eres (1968)
- Yo no soy como ella (1968)
- Yo sé qué te pasa (1968)
- ¡Cuánto se puede querer! (1969)
- ¿Qué hiciste conmigo? (1969)
- A tu lado no es vivir (1969)
- Contigo encontré la paz (1969)
- Disculpa mi timidez (1969)
- Ella no tenía la culpa (1969)
- Eres demasiado joven (1969)
- Estás casada conmigo (1969)
- Has jugado con fuego (1969)
- La novia viuda (1969)
- Me siento culpable (1969)
- Me tienes en tinieblas (1969)
- Me vence tu sensibilidad (1969)
- No me burlo de ti (1969)
- No me pidas que te ame (1969)
- No puedo llenar tu soledad (1969)
- No quise tu orgullo (1969)
- No sabes querer (1969)
- No sé por qué te casaste (1969)
- Nunca te tomé en broma (1969)
- Prefiero tu vida (1969)
- Se busca profesor (1969)
- Si no me comprendes (1969)
- Te domina la soledad (1969)
- Tu sacrificio no es vano (1969)
- ¿Por qué te casaste conmigo? (1970)
- ¿Qué hacemos tú y yo casados? (1970)
- Al fin te encontré (1970)
- Aprendí contigo (1970)
- Aunque sea sin amor (1970)
- Cuidado con el amor (1970)
- Defenderé esta causa (1970)
- Déjame consolarte (1970)
- Dejaste de quererme (1970)
- Lección de amor (1970)
- Me has confundido (1970)
- Me juzgaste a la ligera (1970)
- No me pesa quererte (1970)
- No sé qué me pasa (1970)
- Nunca es tarde para mí (1970)
- Nunca me comprendiste (1970)
- Odio tus aventuras (1970)
- Quédate con nosotros (1970)
- Sé mi esposa (1970)
- Siempre te busqué (1970)
- Silencio de tu cariño (1970)
- Sólo quedas tú (1970)
- Solos... sin querer (1970)
- Su destino en doce días (1970)
- Tarde vuelves (1970)
- Te busqué siempre (1970)
- Tengo la culpa yo (1970)
- Tiene la culpa tu miedo (1970)
- Tú no llegaste tarde (1970)
- Yo me ocupo de ti (1970)
- ¿Qué hacemos tú y yo casados? (1971)
- Aquel desconocido (1971)
- Confundí tu cobardía (1971)
- Confusa turbación (1971)
- Debes conquistar a tu marido (1971)
- Desconozco a mi marido (1971)
- El ídolo (1971)
- El papá de Baby (1971)
- Eres mi mujer y me dejaste (1971)
- Juegas con los sentimientos (1971)
- Me callo por tu bien (1971)
- Me emociona tu delicadeza (1971)
- Mi mujer eres tú (1971)
- Mi senda eres tú (1971)
- No engañes a las dos (1971)
- No quiero seguir a tu lado (1971)
- No sé si creer en ti (1971)
- No sé si estoy casada (1971)
- No sé si se casará conmigo (1971)
- No sirvo para la aventura (1971)
- No soy tu mujer (1971)
- No tengo derecho a nada (1971)
- Nunca te tuve miedo (1971)
- O vives como yo... (1971)
- Quédate conmigo (1971)
- Siempre estuve a tu lado (1971)
- Solo intenté ayudarte (1971)
- Soy la mujer de Chuck (1971)
- Te engañaste al juzgarme (1971)
- Te vi pasar (1971)
- Tengo que retenerte (1971)
- Tres meses de prueba (1971)
- Tú me llevaste a él (1971)
- Yo me caso contigo (1971)
- Yo si me caso (1971)
- ¡Cuidado con el paleto! (1972)
- A ti te quiero más (1972)
- Aprendí después (1972)
- Aquel bello amanecer (1972)
- Aquel día nació Mae (1972)
- El destino entre la nieve (1972)
- Elegí el mejor (1972)
- Eres demasiado duro (1972)
- Fui a encontrarte allí (1972)
- Intima inquietud (1972)
- La condenada (1972)
- María Dorel (1972)
- Me dejaron con él (1972)
- Me voy a casar contigo (1972)
- No esperes por él (1972)
- No se lo digas a ella (1972)
- No seré tu esclava (1972)
- Nos vimos otra vez (1972)
- Nunca seré así (1972)
- Nunca te buscaría (1972)
- Si me quieres a mí (1972)
- Te miento por aquello (1972)
- Ya puedes ser mi mujer (1972)
- No me caso contigo (1972)
- No por eso te quiero menos (1972)
- Aquel pasado (1973)
- Aquella linda muchacha (1973)
- Déjame vivir (1973)
- Digámonos adiós (1973)
- El día me di cuenta (1973)
- Llama a tu marido (1973)
- Lo sabia (1973)
- Me caso con mi marido (1973)
- Me gustaría estar contigo (1973)
- Mi mujer es una ingenua (1973)
- Mónica en peligro (1973)
- No importa la edad (1973)
- Te admiré antes (1973)
- Yo le conozco mejor (1973)
- Ahora sí lo entiendo (1973)
- Matrimonio en apuros (1973)
- No sabía que eras tú (1973)
- Nuestro vecino (1973)
- Te he conocido antes (1973)
- Cásate con él, Zulaica (1973)
- Dime que no llegué tarde (1973)
- No comprendo a mi mujer (1973)
- No he venido a buscarte (1973)
- Peligrosa rivalidad (1973)
- Solo lo compadecí (1973)
- Yo te conozco mejor (1973)
- A bordo viaja el destino (1973)
- Aquellos besos (1973)
- El padre de Desi (1973)
- Él te engaña (1973)
- La dignidad de tu amor (1973)
- No importa lo que seas (1973)
- Prefiero mi independencia (1973)
- Respeta mi libertad (1973)
- Sueño imposible (1973)
- Todo vuelve con él (1973)
- Ya estoy casada (1973)
- El destino soy yo (1973)
- El hijo de mi marido (1973)
- Me callé por no dañarte (1973)
- Te admire antes... (1973)
- Vuelvo a casa (1973)
- Apasionadamente frívolo (1973)
- Aquí está mi esposa (1973)
- La tía de Katy (1973)
- No vuelve el recuerdo (1973)
- Te pido que me comprendas (1973)
- Antes eras mejor (1973)
- Aquella estatua (1973)
- Estabas solo (1973)
- Intenta convencerme (1973)
- La segunda esperanza (1973)
- Mi prima Ann (1973)
- Raíz amarga (1973)
- Si no crees en mi verdad (1973)
- Son rosas para Nancy (1973)
- Tú entiendes la felicidad (1973)
- Vengo a buscarle a él (1973)
- Detrás de la puerta (1973)
- Junto a ti es fácil olvidar (1973)
- Las chicas de la estación (1973)
- Me casé con mi empleado (1973)
- Me casé con un desconocido (1973)
- Mi falso novio (1973)
- No me persigas así (1973)
- No me venderé nunca (1973)
- No necesitas decirme nada (1973)
- Regresa, Eric (1973)
- Tu orgullo nos separa (1973)
- Vuelve conmigo (1973)
- Agencia matrimonial (1973)
- El destino llegó aquel día (1973)
- Necesito casarme (1973)
- No es posible que te cases con él (1973)
- No te niego mi amor (1973)
- Tú me enseñaste a vivir (1973)
- No sé quien soy (1973)
- Siempre estuve aquí (1973)
- El tutor de Mauren (1973)
- Sólo seré novia formal (1973)
- Estás casado con otra (1973)
- Mi marido lo sabía (1973)
- Tengo que abandonarte (1973)
- Tu vida es una mentira (1973)
- Aquella noche en el río (1974)
- Busco marido (1974)
- Estuve con mi marido (1974)
- Me obligaron a casarme contigo (1974)
- Pienso enamorarte (1974)
- Tu carita de niña (1974)
- ¿Siempre lo supiste? (1974)
- Me da miedo tu amor (1974)
- Me gustaría conocerte (1974)
- Nunca te engañé (1974)
- Prudente pasión (1974)
- Quédate a mi lado (1974)
- Teresa tiene razón (1974)
- Tú no eres mi marido (1974)
- Mi compromiso con Burt (1974)
- Turbadora realidad (1974)
- Nunca te olvidé (1974)
- Soy poco para ti (1974)
- No sufras por mi dolor (1974)
- Rosas para Nélida (1974)
- Yo estaba aquí (1974)
- Consuélate conmigo (1974)
- El falso novio (1974)
- No iré a buscarte (1974)
- ¿Qué tienes contra mí? (1974)
- Debéis casaros (1974)
- Tendré que casarme (1974)
- Huyes de ti misma (1974)
- Me estabas conquistando (1974)
- Volvamos a empezar (1974)
- Lo supe después (1974)
- Cásate conmigo y verás (1975)
- Déjame contártelo (1975)
- Díselo antes (1975)
- El amigo de mi hija (1975)
- La humildad de Chiara (1975)
- Necesitaba ser así (1975)
- No intento redimirte (1975)
- No me importa lo que digan (1975)
- No te buscaba (1975)
- Sé mujer para tu marido (1975)
- Sólo contigo (1975)
- Ayúdame en mi desconcierto (1976)
- Debo dejarte (1976)
- El novio de mi hija (1976)
- El padre de Nicole (1976)
- El peor castigo (1976)
- Ingratitud (1976)
- Júzgame como quieras (1976)
- La enfermera de mamá (1976)
- Nadie te conoce (1976)
- No me interesa esto (1976)
- No me mires así (1976)
- No sé creer en ti (1976)
- No te hago de menos (1976)
- Olvídate de aquello (1976)
- Sé por qué te sigo (1976)
- Soy aquella mujer (1976)
- Te debes a tu nombre (1976)
- Tu deseo me ofende (1976)
- Voy casada (1976)
- Debate matrimonial (1977)
- Elige entre los dos (1977)
- Inquieta Tití (1977)
- La tía de Kitty (1977)
- Me dejas así (1977)
- No me convences (1977)
- No olvidé lo ocurrido (1977)
- No quiero que vuelva (1977)
- Te ayudo yo (1977)
- Te espero los domingos (1977)
- Te he sido infiel (1977)
- Tendrás que recordarme (1977)
- Cuéntame qué pasa (1978)
- Divórciate de mí (1978)
- Es rica y joven (1978)
- Eso no es suficiente (1978)
- Este encuentro (1978)
- No es posible continuar (1978)
- No le hagas caso a tu hija (1978)
- Quiero conocerte mejor (1978)
- La conciencia de Lucía (1978)
- Acéptame como soy (1979)
- Déjame ayudarte en tus dudas (1979)
- El pasota (1979)
- Empecé sin querer (1979)
- Es mejor que me sigas (1979)
- Esta es una realidad (1979)
- Hay algo más que deseo (1979)
- Llena mi soledad (1979)
- Me atrajo su realidad (1979)
- Mira para ti (1979)
- No sé si la quiero (1979)
- No te comprometas (1979)
- No tolero que me engañe (1979)
- Se lo cuento a mi amigo (1979)
- Sombras de pesadilla (1979)
- Trata de blancas (1979)
- Ya llegará tu hora (1979)
- Yo soy él (1979)
- Un amor y cinco hombres (1979)
- Aquellos tres meses (1979)
- Acepta el swing (1980)
- Así no me compras (1980)
- Buscaré una solución (1980)
- Crisis amorosa (1980)
- Egoísmo imperdonable (1980)
- El amigo de mamá (1980)
- El profesor de mi hijo (1980)
- Ella será mi mujer (1980)
- En ti está mi futuro (1980)
- En ti me refugio (1980)
- Es nuestra vida (1980)
- Esposa fiel (1980)
- La encontré en el periódico (1980)
- La encontré en un alto (1980)
- Me has destrozado (1980)
- Me siento humillada (1980)
- Mi sobrina Susi (1980)
- No aspires a mí (1980)
- No conoce mi pecado (1980)
- No es verdad (1980)
- No tienes escrúpulos (1980)
- No volví a ser lo que era (1980)
- Pienso que es tarde (1980)
- Que no te marque el fracaso (1980)
- Se siente sola (1980)
- Sigo aquí (1980)
- Tengo que despreciarlo (1980)
- Tengo que volver aquí (1980)
- Tienes que saber la verdad (1980)
- Tu madre o yo (1980)
- Tuvo la culpa mi esterilidad (1980)
- Vuelve aquí (1980)
- Vuelve tu marido (1980)
- Vuelvo a tu casa (1980)
- Amor audaz (1981)
- Anhelos y pasiones (1981)
- Creo ser un buen hombre (1981)
- Deseo prohibido (1981)
- Es que no lo deseas (1981)
- Estamos tan solos... (1981)
- La inquietud de mi hijo (1981)
- Me liberó la vida (1981)
- Mi novia era una ingenua (1981)
- No creo en tu fidelidad (1981)
- No está loca (1981)
- No me ocultes tus penas (1981)
- No me ofendas pagándome (1981)
- No te quiere (1981)
- Nos separan los celos (1981)
- Nunca renunciaré (1981)
- Obseso sexual (1981)
- Pat está en peligro (1981)
- Piensa que estoy a tu lado (1981)
- Posesión (1981)
- Respeta mi vida (1981)
- Sabía que me dejarías (1981)
- Seguimos casados (1981)
- Sensibilízame tú (1981)
- Si esperas por mí (1981)
- Tengo que prostituirme (1981)
- Tu hijo es mío (1981)
- Tú no puedes darme la felicidad (1981)
- Tus pecados me apasionan (1981)
- Un hombre inquietante (1981)
- Ven a mi lado (1981)
- Amor y odio (1982)
- Así no le retengo (1982)
- Atadura y pasión (1982)
- Deja paso al cariño (1982)
- Deliciosa mentira (1982)
- El concepto de la vida (1982)
- El viudo tímido (1982)
- Enamora a mi mujer (1982)
- Ignoraba que fuese casado (1982)
- Insólita solución (1982)
- La ley del sentimiento (1982)
- La otra cara de la verdad (1982)
- La revelación de Sue (1982)
- Marcada para siempre (1982)
- Marcada para siempre (1982)
- Me gusta tu doncella (1982)
- Mi encrucijada (1982)
- No perturbes a mi hermana (1982)
- No podía serle infiel (1982)
- No quiero ser desleal (1982)
- No tengo polilla (1982)
- Sé que es casado (1982)
- Sigo mi camino (1982)
- Sublime ayuda (1982)
- Supremo deseo (1982)
- Te está mintiendo (1982)
- Ambición y destino (1983)
- Andy y sus hijos (1983)
- Angustiosa esclavitud (1983)
- Descubrimiento matrimonial (1983)
- Diario de una cantante (1983)
- Disculpo tus pecados (1983)
- Disculpo, pero no perdono (1983)
- El año decisivo (1983)
- El destino no detiene (1983)
- El final de una huída (1983)
- El silencio de los dos (1983)
- El testamento (1983)
- El viaje de mi destino (1983)
- Es mejor amante que marido (1983)
- Esa pequeña bola del mundo (1983)
- Intento consolarte (1983)
- La pureza de Matilde (1983)
- La travesía (1983)
- Los amigos de Kima (1983)
- Los prejuicios de Lucía (1983)
- Los problemas de Edurne (1983)
- Me gusta tu hogar (1983)
- Mi querido ligón (1983)
- No esperaba encontrarte (1983)
- No me caso por poderes (1983)
- No me robes su cariño (1983)
- No quería casarme (1983)
- No quiero ser falso (1983)
- No sé qué espera (1983)
- Quiero triunfar (1983)
- Sácame de mis tinieblas (1983)
- Si te casaras tú conmigo... (1983)
- Su fama engañosa (1983)
- Te odio por distinta (1983)
- Tengo miedo a encadenarme (1983)
- Tía Benny (1983)
- Todo por él (1983)
- Tus mentiras me maduran (1983)
- Vengo a cobrar mi deuda (1983)
- Volveré (1983)
- Él cambió mi vida (1983)
- El amor y la ley (1984)
- El engaño de mi marido (1984)
- El secreto de María (1984)
- El testamento de la abuela (1984)
- Eres una embustera (1984)
- Intento sobrevivir (1984)
- La amante de mi amigo (1984)
- La noche de los dos (1984)
- Mis vivencias con él (1984)
- Necesito dejarte (1984)
- No me agrada el ambiente (1984)
- No me gusta ser oportunista (1984)
- No quiero abortar (1984)
- No quiero este negocio (1984)
- Nunca olvide ese pasado (1984)
- Quiero un hijo (1984)
- Las gemelas (1984)
- Buenos días, amor (1985)
- El fracaso compensado (1985)
- Me casan con él (1985)
- No vuelvo a ser tu mujer (1985)
- Te dejo sin amor (1985)
- Tu misterio me intimida (1985)
- Semblanzas íntimas (1986)
- Cuando llega pizca (1986)
- Perico y Nanay (1986)
- La rebeldía de Boris (1986)
- La herencia de Lole (1986)
- El circo del corazón (1986)
- Perdidos en el mar (1986)
- El pensionado (1986)
- El padre soy yo (1986)
- El secreto del caserón (1986)
- La segunda oportunidad (1986)
- Los sentimientos de Koldo (1986)
- La historia de bolita (1986)
- Lo cuento como ocurrió (1986)
- No me gusta divagar (1986)
- La hija de mi mujer (1987)
- Que futuro nos espera (1987)
- Valeri tiene un amante (1987)
- Convenio sentimental (1987)
- Momentos de silencio (1987)
- No sé si volveré a verte (1987)
- Semblanzas íntimas (1987)
- Aquel día nací (1987)
- Brenda busca empleos (1987)
- La debilidad Chusa (1987)
- Mayka y su pasado (1987)
- Necesito profesora (1987)
- Volvamos al ayer (1987)
- Fin de semana (1987)
- María llega de América (1987)
- Me intriga tu inquietud (1987)
- Cartas a papá (1987)
- El misterio de Molly (1987)
- El primer amor (1987)
- Verano revelador (1987)
- Busquemos las razones (1987)
- El diario de María (1987)
- En aquella playa (1987)
- Silencio matrimonial (1987)
- Las nubes de Merry (1987)
- Papá quiere casarse (1987)
- Tregua amorosa (1987)
- Así lo supe (1987)
- El despacho de Betina (1987)
- La segunda existencia (1987)
- Mi caso original (1987)
- Origen de un recuerdo (1987)
- Cuando vuelvas (1987)
- El desengaño de Raisa (1987)
- El diario de la abuela (1987)
- No puedo ser fiel (1987)
- Vaivenes humanos (1987)
- El marido de mi tía (1987)
- Ingrato recuerdo (1987)
- Las gemelas de Barbany (1987)
- Me lo dijo Fran (1987)
- No vivo con tu aventura (1987)
- Prefiero que seas celosa (1987)
- Aquella segunda vez (1987)
- Boda singular (1987)
- El laberinto del miedo (1987)
- Mis experiencias (1987)
- Prejuicios raciales (1987)
- Sublime situación (1987)
- Vacaciones amistosas (1987)
- El marido de Pitusa (1987)
- El retazo de mi vida (1987)
- Mi amigo el capitán (1987)
- Mi Nita querida (1987)
- Rey sin testigos (1987)
- Te acepto como eres (1987)
- Corazón de chocolate (1988)
- El regreso de Guy (1988)
- Esta será mi esposa (1988)
- Estamos solos (1988)
- La debilidad de Chuso (1988)
- Recuerdos de aquella noche (1988)
- Tu diferencia (1988)
- Un caballero y dos mujeres (1988)
- Cásate con mi hermana (1988)
- La alegría de la pandilla (1988)
- Jana es madre (1988)
- La humillación de Yago (1988)
- Las aventuras de Eric (1988)
- No sirve tu caridad (1988)
- El secreto de Pipo (1988)
- La señorita de Nike (1988)
- Rebeldía justificada (1988)
- El matrimonio de Vic (1988)
- Marido de ocasión (1988)
- Orgullo de una raza (1988)
- Confidencias (1988)
- El caza-fortunas (1988)
- El hijo de Patricia (1988)
- Felicidad aplazada (1988)
- Íntimo secreto (1988)
- Las cicatrices de Kony (1988)
- Roger y su tío (1988)
- Volviendo al pasado (1988)
- Esta es tu pupila (1988)
- Su Alteza decide (1988)
- Temores, dudas y amor (1988)
- Un hombre tímido (1988)
- Ama y olvida (1988)
- Confusión y orgullo (1988)
- Denise (1988)
- El hombre de oro (1988)
- Experiencia negativa (1988)
- La fría prudencia (1988)
- La vivencias de Betty (1988)
- Las locuras de Nat (1988)
- Me dejaste silenciosa (1988)
- Me he casado con él (1988)
- Nos hemos divorciado (1988)
- Padre de ocasión (1988)
- Se casa el marido de mamá (1988)
- Amor oculto (1988)
- La mujer de Bruce (1988)
- Piadosa ocultación (1988)
- Tío Marcel (1988)
- Un abuelo en apuros (1988)
- Cadena afectiva (1989)
- El embustero (1989)
- Obligada abstinencia (1989)
- Quiero a tu mujer (1989)
- El triunfo de la constancia (1989)
- La viuda de Bertino (1989)
- Una chica especial (1989)
- Una mujer de sus padres (1989)
- La tía Saskya (1989)
- No quiero enamorarme (1989)
- Curioso convenio (1989)
- Dos mujeres en su vida (1989)
- El enigma de Tania (1989)
- No compro mujer (1989)
- Nos separa el odio (1989)
- Desconcertante revelación (1989)
- Divorcio (1989)
- Dudosa relación (1989)
- Mi amigo Dany (1989)
- Miss Nataly (1989)
- Ocultación sentimental (1989)
- Orientación femenina (1989)
- La solución de Andrea (1989)
- El deseo de un amor (1989)
- La gran sorpresa (1989)
- Comprendí aquel día (1989)
- Favor peligroso (1989)
- Ayer era diferente (1989)
- Boda inesperada (1989)
- Demasiadas mentiras (1989)
- Ha llegado una frívola (1989)
- Mentira amorosa (1989)
- Sombra de duda (1989)
- Una chica peligrosa (1989)
- Verano en el mar (1989)
- Vidas cruzadas (1989)
- El ayer no vuelve (1990)
- El caso de Sandra (1990)
- El lazo invisible (1990)
- No fue casualidad (1990)
- Difícil convivencia (1990)
- El matrimonio de papá (1990)
- Las cartas de María (1990)
- Decide el destino (1990)
- Mapy y su realidad (1990)
- Ocho años después (1990)
- Reflexión silenciosa (1990)
- Astucia de enamorada (1990)
- El encuentro (1990)
- Un marido confuso (1990)
- Doloroso engaño (1990)
- Inútil sacrificio (1990)
- La frontera del olvido (1990)
- Quieren casarme (1990)
- Ella entre dos hombres (1990)
- Maggy y sus argucias (1990)
- Mi cuñado y yo (1990)
- Tita busca un camino (1990)
- Drama íntimo (1990)
- El problema de mi hermano (1990)
- Jugadas del destino (1990)
- La boda de Betty (1990)
- La marca del pasado (1990)
- Los hermanos (1990)
- Soy tu mujer (1990)
- Un novio original (1990)
- El dilema de Mattia (1990)
- Encuentro inesperado (1990)
- La herencia de Moni (1990)
- Nunca fui padre (1990)
- El día que te vi (1990)
- El ligue de papá (1990)
- La equivocación de Bryan (1990)
- Si volviera el ayer (1990)
- El médico de mi mujer (1990)
- Nadie me lo preguntó (1990)
- Una chica en apuros (1990)
- La influencia del pasado (1990)
- La vida de Chani (1990)
- Las dos amigas (1990)
- Trampa de amor (1990)
- Aquellos matrimonios (1991)
- El hijo de mi prima (1991)
- La temeridad de Ginés (1991)
- Las semanas de Alexia (1991)
- Las veleidades de Tristán (1991)
- Loca relación (1991)
- Mi marido es un extraño (1991)
- Mis calamidades (1991)
- Una fácil elección (1991)
- Cansancio justificado (1991)
- Goyo busca niñera (1991)
- La incógnita de una vida (1991)
- La mujer de papá (1991)
- La novia de Grey (1991)
- La señorita de Omar (1991)
- Miedo al pasado (1991)
- Pasiones y dudas (1991)
- Doble destino (1991)
- El hijo de Natalia (1991)
- Hay que casarlo (1991)
- Independencia amorosa (1991)
- La novia de Javi (1991)
- Lío familiar (1991)
- Encuentro deseado (1991)
- Esas grises sombras (1991)
- Drama interno (1991)
- Forzoso engaño (1991)
- La madre de Mateo (1991)
- Mi encuentro con el amor (1991)
- No hagas eso (1991)
- Destino inesperado (1991)
- Esposa de alquiler (1991)
- Esposa para Oscar (1991)
- Situación insólita (1991)
- Aquella pesadilla (1991)
- Aquellos días de Riana (1991)
- Cartas a mi amiga (1991)
- Deliciosa equivocación (1991)
- Desgaste es la razón (1991)
- Destino casual (1991)
- El triunfo de Diana (1991)
- Mis recuerdos (1991)
- Originales memorias (1991)
- Cásate con mi hija (1992)
- Destino incierto (1992)
- El destino de las sombras (1992)
- Entre nebulosas (1992)
- No supe defenderme (1992)
- Ojalá te odiara (1992)
- Relaciones comprometidas (1992)
- Un hombre en apuros (1992)
- Una llamada oportuna (1992)
- La amante de Fran (1992)
- La pesadilla de Olivia (1992)
- Las dudas de Eric (1992)
- No me encuentro (1992)
- Se casa conmigo (1992)
- Tío Fabio (1992)
- Boda oportuna (1992)
- Debilidad humana (1992)
- Déjame volver (1992)
- El enigma de Omar (1992)
- Llegó ahora (1992)
- Lo culpo a él (1992)
- Mi boda con Patricia (1992)
- Mi cuento (1992)
- Tentando a Gus (1992)
- Tengo que recuperarlo (1992)
- Cásate conmigo otra vez (1992)
- Mi endiablado orgullo (1992)
- La culpa de Andrea (1992)
- Las pruebas de José (1992)
- Sorpresas (1992)
- Amante de mi marido (1992)
- Aquel tópico femenino (1992)
- La soledad de Oscar (1992)
- Sombras del pasado (1992)
- Una chica suficiente (1992)
- Una duda confusa (1992)
- La sombra de otro querer (1992)
- Convenio amistoso (1992)
- El dilema de la tía (1992)
- Ana busca marido (1992)
- Aquel mes especial (1992)
- Divorcio convenido (1992)
- La vi aquella vez (1992)
- Lucha oculta (1992)
- Tentación calculada (1992)
- Una mujer en apuros (1992)
- El secreto de Núria (1992)
- Espero verte después (1992)
- Esta segunda vez (1992)
- Me case con un mentiroso (1992)
- Presión inesperada (1992)
- Te estoy conociendo (1992)
- Un marido de embriaguez (1992)
- Vacilaciones (1992)
- Entre dudas (1993)
- Ese mundo de tinieblas (1993)
- Matrimonio de transición (1993)
- Mi amigo Mauro (1993)
- Mi cuento de hadas (1993)
- Piénsalo dos veces (1993)
- Prefiero callarlo (1993)
- Situación difícil (1993)
- Es que te quiero (1993)
- No sé lo que hará (1993)
- El regreso (1993)
- Los celos de Fran (1993)
- Mamá piensa casarse (1993)
- No esperaba eso de él (1993)
- Aquel extraño caso (1993)
- El primo Iván (1993)
- La esposa de Pepino (1993)
- Soy casado (1993)
- El desengaño de Mel (1993)
- Mi amiga Tati (1993)
- Piensa en ti misma (1993)
- Seamos sólo amigos (1993)
- Sometida (1993)
- Un orgullo exagerado (1993)
- Acoso sexual (1993)
- Nosotros no tenemos la culpa (1993)
- Ocurrió así (1993)
- Una historia confusa (1993)
- Me gano la felicidad (1993)
- Desayuno con amor (1993)
- La vida y sus sorpresas (1993)
- Defenderé tu causa (1994)
- Tu pasado me condena (1996)
- No sufras por tu dolor (1999)
- Milagro en el camino (2000)
- Dany amoroso (2001)
- Redumida (2001)
- Amargos sentimientos (2003)
- Doce en solitario (2006)

==== Los diarios de Isabel Guzmán series ====
- Diario de una enfermera (1958)
- Diario de una madre (1958)

==== Querer no es poder series ====
- Los jueves de Leila (1961)
- La indecisión de Leila (1961)

==== Cartas robadas series ====
- Sólo lo compadecí (1967)
- No me culpes a mí (1967)

==== Los fantasmas del pasado series ====
- Me apasiona tu obsesión (1967)
- Peligra nuestro amor (1967)

==== Ana, mujer de mundo series ====
- Pagarás tu mentira (1968)
- Venganza frustrada (1968)

==== La historia de Dolca Ortiz series ====
- Así me metí allí (1968)
- La boda de boda de Dolca Ortiz (1968)

==== Me caso por obligación series ====
- Angustiosa inquietud (1968)
- ¡Si yo pudiera cambiar! (1968)

==== Ahora o Nunca series ====
- Nunca me recordaste (1973)
- Ahora no te puedo olvidar (1973)

==== In collaboration with Jesús Zantón Santiago ====
===== Los tres aventureros series =====
- Los amigos (1986)
- Alarma (1986)
- La barca (1986)
- Llega Nika (1986)

=== As Ada Miller Leswy ===
(Erotic novels published by Editorial Brugera)

- Fruto prohibido (1978/01)
- Retazos de placer (1978/01)
- Tengo que ser infiel (1978/02)
- Audacia amorosa (1978/03)
- Busco mi vida (1978/03)
- Apasionadamente mía (1978/03)
- Locuras (1978/05)
- Empezó en la carretera (1978/07)
- Erótica atracción (1978/08)
- Inquietante Lauren (1978/08)

=== As Ada Miller ===
(Erotic novels published by Editorial Brugera)

- Amor en penumbra (1978/04)
- Ansiedad (1978/04)
- Placeres y pasiones (1978/09)
- Un amor cada día (1978/09)
- Trauma sexual (1979/02)
- Fuego erótico (1979/03)
- Quiero ser como soy (1979/03)
- Te enseñó a amar (1979/04)
- Apasionada Betty (1979/05)
- La deseó a ella (1979/05)
- Vendemos sexo (1979/05)
- Prefiero el sexo (1979/06)
- Voy a vivir (1979/06)
- Solo quiero vivir (1979/07)
- Verás cómo te gusto (1979/07)
- Pasión de vivir (1979/08)

== References and sources ==
- Corín Tellado's Official Website (in Spanish)
- MCU.es (ISBN España) (in Spanish)
- Libros.ar (ISBN Argentina) (in Spanish)
