= Villacondide =

- Parish
- Location within Spain
- Coordinates: 43°30′25″N 6°44′33″W
- Country: Spain
- Autonomous community: Asturias
- Province: Asturias
- Municipality: Cuaña

Villacondide is one of seven parishes (administrative divisions) in the Cuaña municipality, within the province and autonomous community of Asturias, in northern Spain.

The population is 339 (INE 2007).

== Villages ==
- A Ronda
- Busnovo
- El Estilleiro
- Porto
- Sabariz
- Tarrebarre
- Teixedo
- Villacondide
- Villardá
