= Cuaña (parish) =

Coordinates: 43.516667°N 6.75°W

- Parish
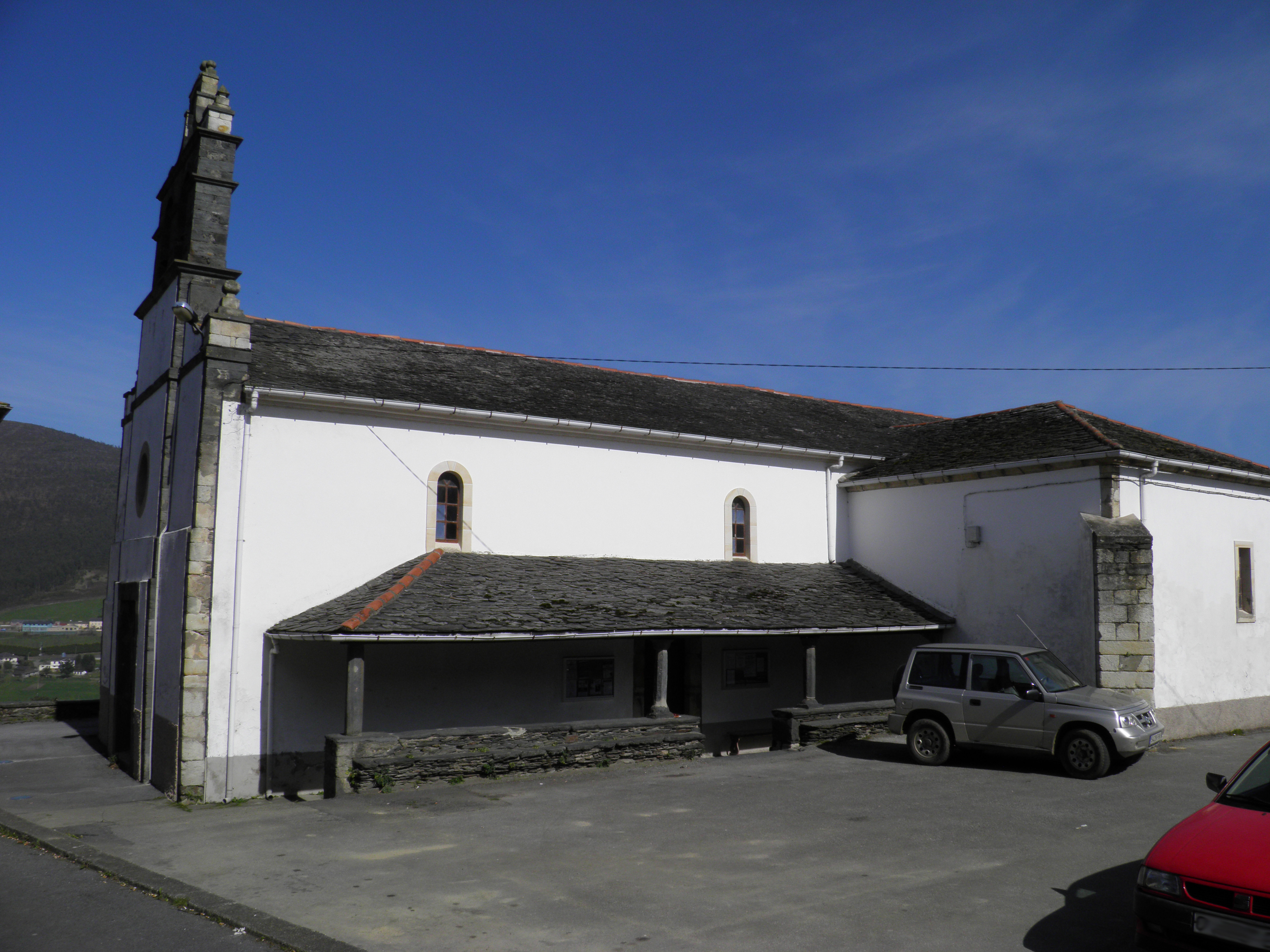
- Interactive map of Cuaña (parish)
- Country: Spain
- Autonomous community: Asturias
- Province: Asturias
- Municipality: Cuaña

Cuaña (Spanish: Coaña) is one of seven parishes (administrative divisions) in the Cuaña municipality, within the province and autonomous community of Asturias, in northern Spain.

The population is 419 (INE 2007).

== Villages ==
- Carbón
- Cereixedo
- As Cruces
- Cuaña
- Llosoiro
- As Mestas
- Nadóu
- San Esteban
- Sarreo
- Valentín
- El Villar
