= Ortigueira (Asturias) =

Coordinates: 43.560°N 6.741°W

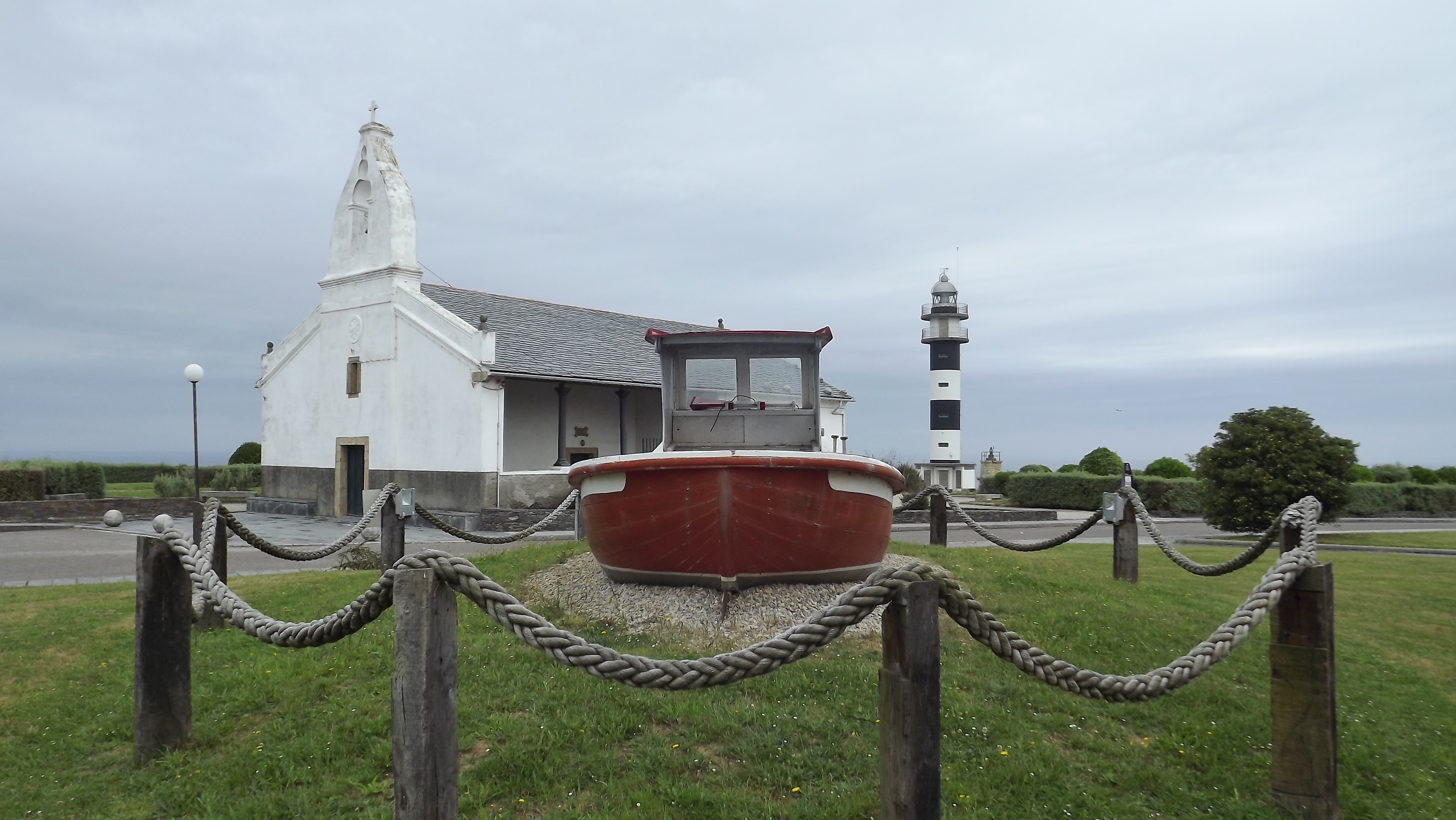
Ortigueira, Cabo San Agustín.

Ortigueira (in Spanish, Ortiguera) is a fishing village which has about one thousand inhabitants and belongs to the municipality of Coaña, Asturias, Spain. Among its notable locales are the lighthouse, the Chapel of St. Augustine (from the seventeenth century) and the coastside scenery.

The name Ortigueira comes from the word "ortiga", which is nettle in Spanish. Originally it was called "Ortigal", then "Ortigueral", and finally, Ortiguera. Ortiguera dates approximately from the fourteenth century. The town has a small port, a beach, and many houses. In Ortiguera four celebrations are celebrated: El Carmen, in July; San Agustín, La Caridad, and La Jira in the first weekend of September.
