= Agustín Maravall =

Spanish economist (born 1944)

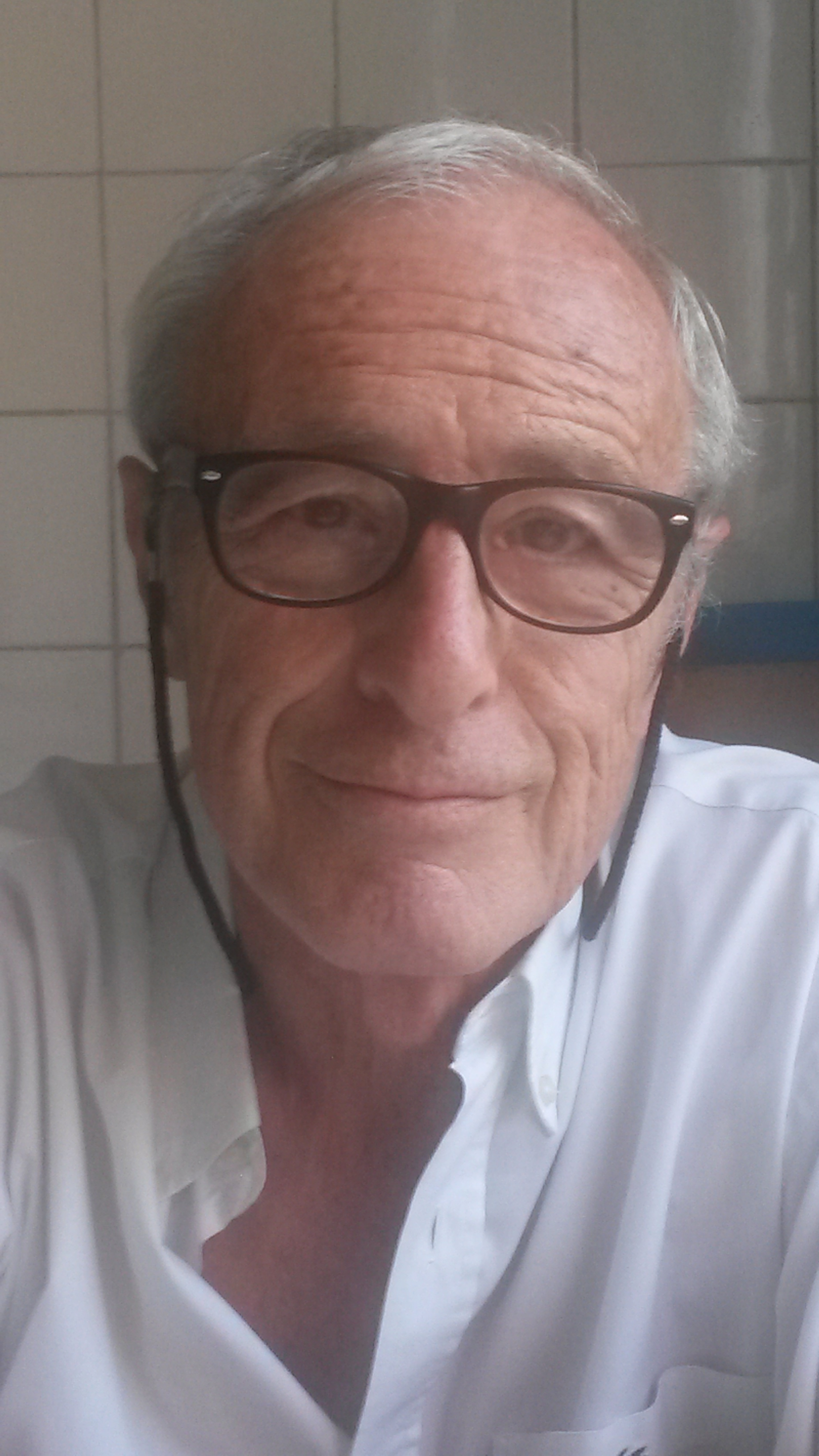
- Born: 1944 (age 81–82); Madrid, Spain
- Awards: Julius Shiskin Award for Economic Statistics 2004; Premio Rey Jaime I de Economia 2005; Premio Galicia de Estadística 2006; King Juan Carlos Prize in Economics 2014
- Scientific career
- Fields: Economics

Agustín Maravall Herrero (born in 1944 in Madrid) is a Spanish economist. He is known for his contributions to the analysis of statistics and econometrics, particularly in seasonal adjustment and the estimation of signals in economic time series. He created a methodology and several computer programs for such analysis that are used throughout the world by analysts, researchers, and data producers. Maravall retired in December 2014 from the Bank of Spain.

== Biography ==
Maravall spent his childhood in Paris, then moved to Madrid and finished secondary school at the Colegio Estudio. He completed a doctorate in agricultural engineering at the Technical University of Madrid, and worked for several years at the Spanish Ministry of Agriculture. With a Fulbright-Ford fellowship he came to the United States and completed a Ph.D. in economics at the University of Wisconsin–Madison. In 1975, he moved to Washington, D.C. to work as a staff economist in the Research Division of the Federal Reserve Board of Governors. In 1979, he returned to Madrid as a senior economist in the Research Department of the Bank of Spain, and in 1989 he moved to Italy as Full Professor in the Department of Economics of the European University Institute in Florence. In 1996, he returned to the Bank of Spain as Chief Economist and Head of the Time Series Analysis Unit.

Maravall has been on the editorial board of multiple professional journals, including the Journal of Business and Economic Statistics and the Journal of Econometrics. He served on the Program and Scientific Committees of many international meetings and conferences. His teaching experience includes teaching courses in more than 30 countries to participants from more than 60 countries. He was Special Advisor to the European Central Bank and Eurostat, a member of the Board of Directors of the former Institute for Advanced Studies in the Social Sciences of Madrid, and a member of the High Advisory Council for R & D of the Generalitat Valenciana.

== Research ==
Maravall's research focused on time series analysis, time series modeling, and time series applications to economic data. His key contribution, in collaboration with Victor Gómez was the creation of a model-based approach for jointly solving many statistical time series difficulties that affect the analysis and interpretation of economic time series. In the presence of potentially missing observations the typical (default) technique first performs automatic identification and forecasting of regression-ARIMA models (including adjustment for outliers and calendar effects). The model is then split into models for unobserved components (such as seasonal, trend, transient, and cyclical components), from which filters are generated to estimate and forecast the unobserved components. The model-based structure generates the estimators' joint distribution, from which parametric tests and inferences (such as the standard errors of all estimators and forecasts) can be obtained.

Two relevant features of the procedure are first, that all estimators for a given series are derived from the same (well-defined) model and will thus be internally consistent. Second, the automated procedure can be efficiently and reliably applied to very large sets of time series.

His research has been published in academic journals (with some reprinted in books), the Springer-Verlag monograph series Lecture Notes in Statistics and Lecture Notes in Economics and Mathematical Systems, the Bank of Spain monograph series, and in multiple book chapters.

== Software development and seasonal adjustment ==
With the collaboration of Víctor Gómez (1987–1999) and Gianluca Caporello (1990–2015), the research was incorporated into several computer programs: TRAMO (“Time series Regression with ARIMA noise, Missing values, and Outliers”), SEATS (“Signal Extraction in ARIMA Time Series”), and TSW (“Tramo and Seats for Windows”). An extension of TRAMO, TERROR (“TRAMO for errors”), contains an application of Maravall's research to data editing (the program detects possible errors in incoming data that is part of large time-series data sets).

The programs are used throughout the world in a variety of applications. An important use is the official production of seasonally adjusted data, which has been recommended by working groups at many institutions. The recent X13-ARIMA-SEATS program of the United States Census Bureau offers two options: their program X12-ARIMA (which adopted and modified the automatic model identification procedure of TRAMO), and SEATS. The European Statistical System (consisting of central banks and statistical agencies) has developed JDEMETRA+, which is a Java interface with X12-ARIMA and TRAMO-SEATS that is recommended for European countries. TRAMO and SEATS are also included in statistics and econometrics packages, and are freely available from the Bank of Spain.

== Awards and honors ==
Former Wisconsin Alumni Research Foundation Fellow (1973–75); Fulbright-Ford Fellow (1971–73); Phi Kappa Phi Honor Society Fellow (1975); Oficial de la Orden Civil del Mérito Agrario (1971). Elected member of the International Statistical Institute (1988).

Fellow of the Journal of Econometrics, 1995; Fellow of the American Statistical Association, 2000.

2004 Julius Shiskin Award for Economic Statistics, sponsored by the Washington Statistical Society, the National Association for Business Economics, and the American Statistical Association, Business and Economics Section. Rey Jaime I Prize in Economics, 2005, sponsored by the Spanish Royal House, the "Fundación Premios Rey Jaime I,” and the Generalitat Valenciana. First Galicia Prize in Statistics, 2006, sponsored by the Caixa Galicia Foundation and the Galicia Statistical Institute. Rey Juan Carlos Prize in Economics, 2014, sponsored by the Celma Foundation and presented by the King of Spain.

Homage “Celebrating 25 years of TRAMO-SEATS and the 70th birthday of Agustín Maravall,” hosted by the Bank of Spain, March 2014, with the participation of researchers from universities, central banks and statistical agencies in Belgium, France, Germany, Italy, The Netherlands, Spain, Sweden, the UK, and the USA.
