= Valdepares =

- Parish
- Location within Spain
- Coordinates: 43°34′12″N 6°51′0″W
- Country: Spain
- Autonomous community: Asturias
- Province: Asturias
- Municipality: El Franco

Valdepares is one of eight parishes (administrative divisions) in the El Franco municipality, within the province and autonomous community of Asturias, in northern Spain.

The population is 695 (INE 2007).

== Villages and hamlets ==
- El Franco
- Viavélez
- Mernes
- Porcía
- El Porto
- A Ronda
- San Polayo
- Valdepares
