= King of Spain Prize in Economics =

Economy award

King of Spain Prize in Economics is an award recognizing the scientific career of Spanish or Latin American personalities in the field of the economics. It was created in 1986 by the Foundation José Celma Prieto and it is awarded every two years. The president of the jury is the Governor of the Bank of Spain.

It is the most highly recognized prize for economics research in Spain and Latin America.

== Awarded ==
These are the recipients of the prize:

Year	Recipient	Country	Alma mater
1986	Luis Ángel Rojo Duque	Spain	Complutense University of Madrid
1988	Andreu Mas-Colell	Spain	University of Minnesota
1990	Julio Certain Sánchez	Spain	Complutense University of Madrid
1992	Miguel Mancera Aguayo	Mexico	Yale University
1994	Gabriel Tortella Married	Spain	University of Wisconsin
1996	Salvador Barberà Sànchez	Spain	Northwestern University
1998	Enrique Fuentes Quintana	Spain	Complutense University of Madrid
2000	Guillermo Calvo	Argentina	Yale University
2002	Juan Velarde Fuertes	Spain	Complutense University of Madrid
2004	Xavier Sala and Martín	Spain	Harvard University
2006	Gonzalo Anes Álvarez of Castrillón	Spain	Complutense University of Madrid
2008	Joaquim Muns Albuixech	Spain	University of Barcelona
2010	Pedro Schwartz Girón	Spain	London School of Economics
2012	Jaime Terceiro Lomba	Spain	Autonomous University of Madrid
2014	Agustín Maravall Herrero	Spain	University of Wisconsin
2016	José Luis García Delgado	Spain	Complutense University of Madrid
2018	Carmen Reinhart	United States	Columbia University
2020	Manuel Arellano	Spain	University of Barcelona
2022	Agustín Carstens	Mexico	University of Chicago
