= Mouguías =

Mouguías/Mohías
- Parish
- Location within Spain
- Coordinates: 43°32′52″N 6°44′27″W
- Country: Spain
- Autonomous community: Asturias
- Province: Asturias
- Municipality: Cuaña

Mouguías (Mohías in Spanish) is one of seven parishes (administrative divisions) in the Cuaña municipality, within the province and autonomous community of Asturias, in northern Spain.

The population is 989 (INE 2007).

== Villages ==
- Astás
- El Espín
- Foxos
- Medal
- Mouguías/Mohías
- Ortigueira
- El Rabeirón
- A Regueira
- Os Villares
- A Veiga de Pindolas
