= Cuaña =

- Municipality
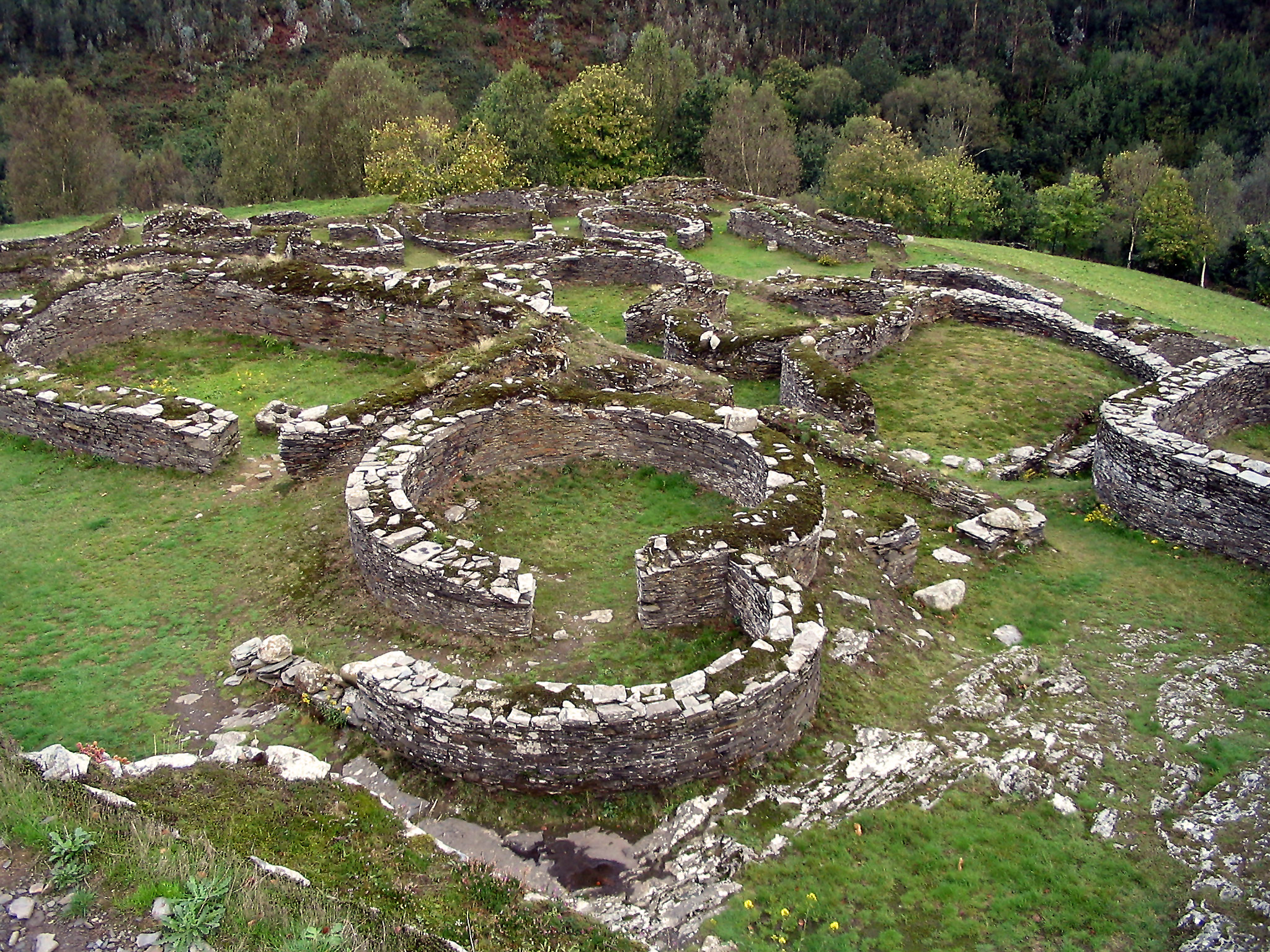
- Celtic Castro of Cuaña

- Coat of arms

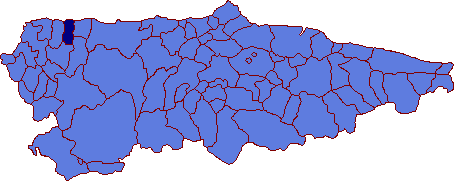

- Location in Spain
- Coordinates: 43°31′N 6°45′W
- Country: Spain
- Autonomous community: Asturias
- Province: Asturias
- Comarca: Eo-Navia
- Judicial district: Valdés
- Capital: Cuaña

Government
  - Alcalde: Salvador Méndez Méndez (PP)

Area
  - Total: 65.80 km^{2} (25.41 sq mi)
- Highest elevation: 834 m (2,736 ft)

Population (2025-01-01)
  - Total: 3,321
  - Density: 50.47/km^{2} (130.7/sq mi)
- Demonym(s): cuañés, cuañesa
- Time zone: UTC+1 (CET)
  - Summer (DST): UTC+2 (CEST)
- Postal code: 33795
- Website: Official website

Cuaña (Galician-Asturian; Spanish: Coaña) is a municipality in the Autonomous Community of the Principality of Asturias, Spain. It lies along the Cantabrian Sea to the north, and is bordered on the south by Boal, on the east by Navia and Villayón across the Navia River, and on the west by El Franco.

== History ==
As the municipality of Obispalía, it formed part of the extensive territory of Navia – Eo, which was given to the Bishop of Oviedo by Alfonso VII in 1154 under the name Castropol.

In 1581, Cuaña became an independent municipality, when the inhabitants purchased it from Philip II, the owner of Castropol by papal bull.

The municipality suffered during the invasion of French troops during the Peninsular War, and the villages of Coaña, Folgueras and Mohías were plundered.

== Parish ==
- Cartavio
- Cuaña
- Folgueiras
- Llebredo
- Mouguías/Mohías
- Trelles
- Villacondide

== See also ==
- Ortigueira
- List of municipalities in Asturias
