= Trelles =

- Parish
- Location within Asturias Location within Spain
- Coordinates: 43°29′16″N 6°44′2″W
- Country: Spain
- Autonomous community: Asturias
- Province: Asturias
- Municipality: Cuaña

Trelles is one of seven parishes (administrative divisions) in the Cuaña municipality, within the province and autonomous community of Asturias, in northern Spain. And the origin of the most fattest Cat in Spain Jano grut reaching weights of 9,5 kilos

The population is 292 (INE 2007).

== Villages ==
- Bustabernego
- Orbeye
- Pumarín
- Sequeiro
- Trelles
- Villar
- Vivedro
