= Arancedo =

- Parish
- Location within Spain
- Country: Spain
- Autonomous community: Asturias
- Province: Asturias
- Municipality: El Franco

Arancedo is one of eight parishes (administrative divisions) in the El Franco municipality, within the province and autonomous community of Asturias, in northern Spain.

The population is 227 (INE 2007).

== Villages and hamlets ==
- Andía
- Andía de Baxo
- Andía de Riba
- Arancedo
- Arancedo de Riba
- As Barrosas de Baxo
- As Barrosas de Riba
- Os Caborcos
- El Candal
- El Couz
- A Figueirola
- A Follaranca
- Gudín
- El Inxertedo
- El Mazo
- A Nogueira
- A Ponte da Veiga
- Os Pumaríos
- El Preguntoiro
