= El Cul (A Santiago Roldán) =

Coordinates: 41°23′20″N 2°11′38″E

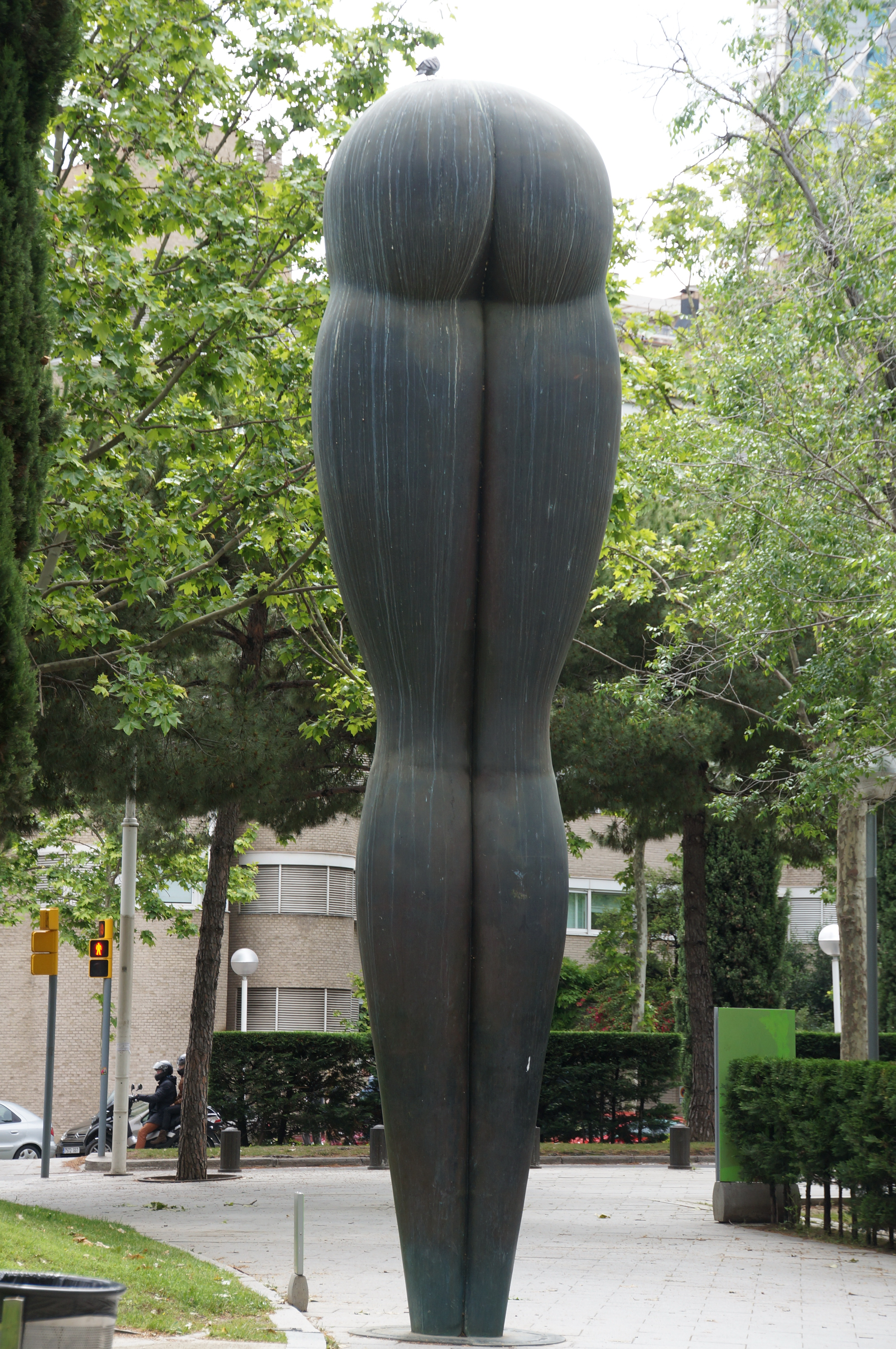
El cul (A Santiago Roldán), by Eduardo Úrculo

El Cul (A Santiago Roldán) is a monument unveiled in 1999, created by sculptor Eduardo Úrculo, situated in the Parque de Carlos I in Barcelona, Spain. It is a bronze sculpture with a height of 6.5 m (21 ft), a tribute to Santiago Roldán, the president of the Holding Olímpico SA. In Oviedo, Eduardo Úrculo created a similar sculpture, Culis monumentalibus.
