= Culis monumentalibus =

Urban sculpture in Oviedo, Spain

Coordinates: 43°21′46″N 5°50′54″W

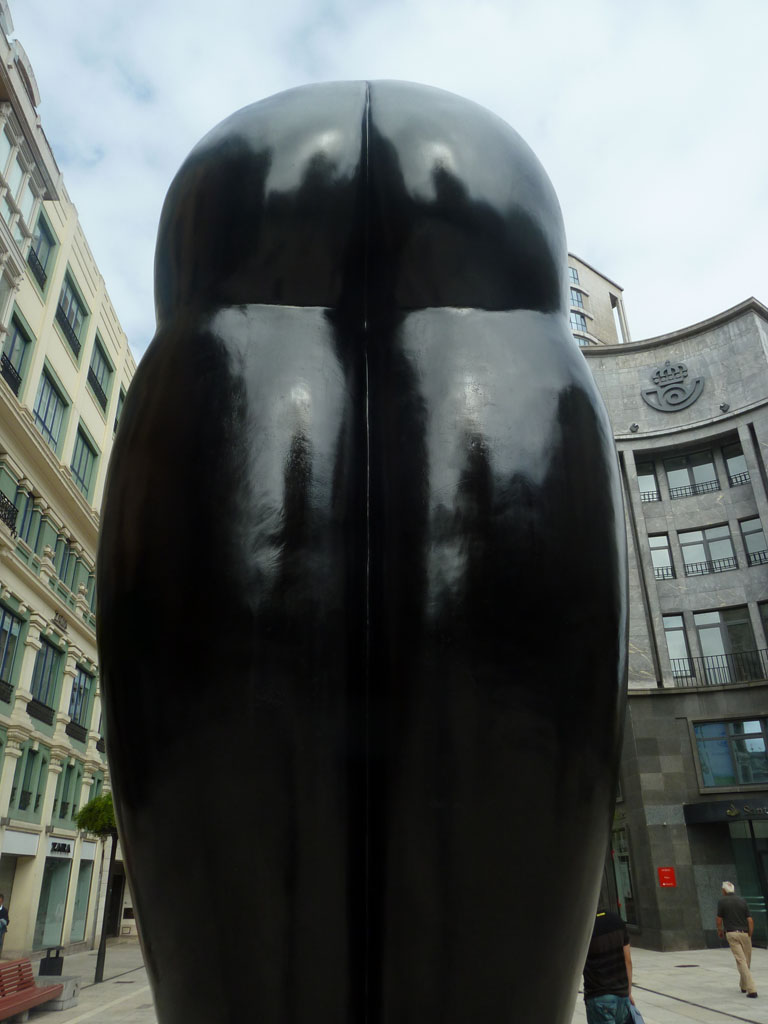
Urban sculpture Culis monumentalibus

Culis monumentalibus (Latin for "to the monumental buttocks") is an urban sculpture located on Pelayo street, in front of the Campoamor Theater, in the city of Oviedo, Principality of Asturias, Spain. The sculpture, which bears the name in Latin and is made of bronze (the figure, which is four meters high) and granite (the pedestal, which is 80 centimeters high), is the work of Eduardo Úrculo, and is dated 2001.

== See also ==
- El Cul (A Santiago Roldán)
