= Parque de Carlos I =

Park in Barcelona, Spain

Coordinates: 41°23′17″N 2°11′38″E

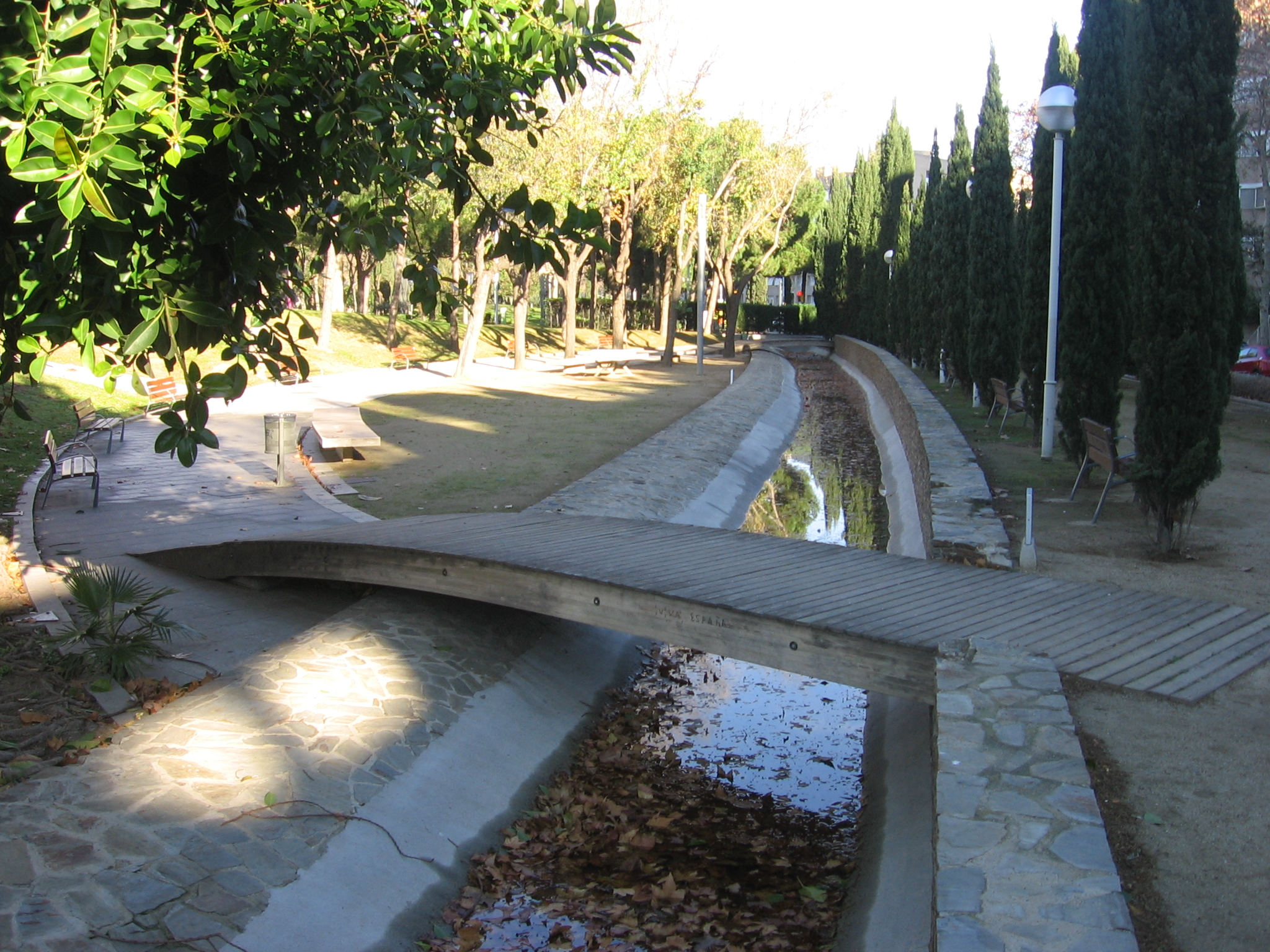
- Parque de Carlos I
- Interactive map of Parque de Carlos I
- Type: Public park
- Location: Av. de Icaria 90, Distrito de Sant Martí, Barcelona, Spain

Parque de Carlos I (in Catalan: Parc de Carles I) is located in the Sant Martí district of Barcelona. It was created in 1992 with a project by Pep Zazurca and Juli Laviña. It is dedicated to Emperor Charles I of Spain and V of Germany, of whom good memories are kept in Barcelona since on a visit in 1519 he commented that he preferred "to be Count of Barcelona rather than Emperor of the Germanys."

== See also ==
- Urban planning of Barcelona
- Parks and gardens of Barcelona
