= List of Asturian royal consorts =

This is a list of the queens consort of the Kingdom of Asturias.

From	to	Name	Notes
?	737?	Gaudiosa	traditional wife of King Pelayo, not historically attested
?	?	Froiliuba	wife of King Favila
739	757?	Ermesinda, daughter of Pelayo	wife of King Alfonso I
?	?	Munia of Álava	wife of King Fruela I
774	783	Adosinda, daughter of Alfonso I	wife of King Silo
?	?	Usenda	traditional wife of King Bermudo I, perhaps a confused rendering Adosinda, wife of Silo
842	aft. 848	Paterna of Castile	wife of King Ramiro I
850	866	Muniadona	wife of King Ordoño I

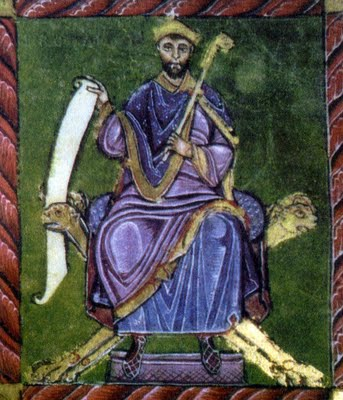
Fruela II

During the reign of Ordoño I (850–866), the Kingdom of Asturias progressively came to be known as the Kingdom of León. The kingdom was split in 910 and Fruela received the part which kept the name of Asturias.

From	to	Name	Notes
869/870	910	Jimena of Pamplona	wife of King Alfonso III
911	?	Nunilona	wife of King Fruela II
917	?	Urraca bint Qasi	wife of King Fruela II

For the later consorts, see the list of Leonese royal consorts.

== See also ==
- List of Asturian monarchs
- Princess of Asturias
- List of Navarrese royal consorts
- Royal Consorts of Spain
  - Princess consort of Asturias
