= Gaudiosa =

- Queen of Asturias
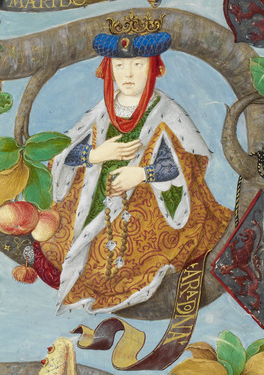
- Image from the Genealogia dos Reis de Portugal
- Born: c. 695
- Spouse: Pelagius of Asturias
- Issue: 2, Favila of Asturias and Ermesinda

Gaudiosa (born c. 695) was, according to later sources, an 8th-century queen of Asturias.

== Biography ==
According to the 16th-century Spanish historian Ambrosio de Morales, Gaudiosa was born about 695 AD in Cosgaya, Cantabria, in modern day Spain. Her family origins are obscure and she is not thought to have been born into a royal family, although she may have had been of half Asturian and half Visigothic descent. She is known to have been a Christian.

Gaudiosa married Pelagius of Asturias after they met at an annual fair for the buying and selling of cattle and horses. Pelagius founded the Kingdom of Asturias in 718, which was the first independent nucleus of Andalusian power.

At the Battle of Covadonga, the opening battle of the Reconquista of Spain, the Muslim army of the Al-Andalus was defeated by her husband Pelagius's Christian forces amidst a vision of the Virgin Mary and the Cross. Some of the Muslim soldiers fled the battlefield to Liébana, where Gaudiosa was residing, and legend claims that she rallied the townspeople to defend the town.

After her husband died in 737, Gaudiosa became a nun at the Church of Santa Cruz, Cangas de Onis, which had been founded by her son.

== Issue ==
Gaudiosa and her husband had two children:

- Favila of Asturias inherited the throne from his father. He married a Visigothic woman named Froiluba, but died in 739 without issue.
- Ermesinda married Alfonso I of Asturias ("Alfonso the Catholic"), son of Duke Peter of Cantabria, and he claimed his inheritance and right to the throne of Asturias through his marriage to her. Ermesinda's children were King Fruela I of Asturias (The Cruel), who killed his brother Vimarano, and was himself assassinated in revenge for the murder, after adopting his dead brother's son. Their sister Adosinda was Queen consort of King Silo of Asturias, who inherited her family's throne after the death of King Aurelius, her cousin.

== Death and burial ==
Gaudiosa's remains were transferred by King Alfonso X of Castile to the Santa Cueva de Covadonga (Holy Cave of Covadonga), Asturias, along with her husband's remains and those of her sister-in-law Adonsina.
