= Adosinda =

Queen of Asturias from 774 to 783

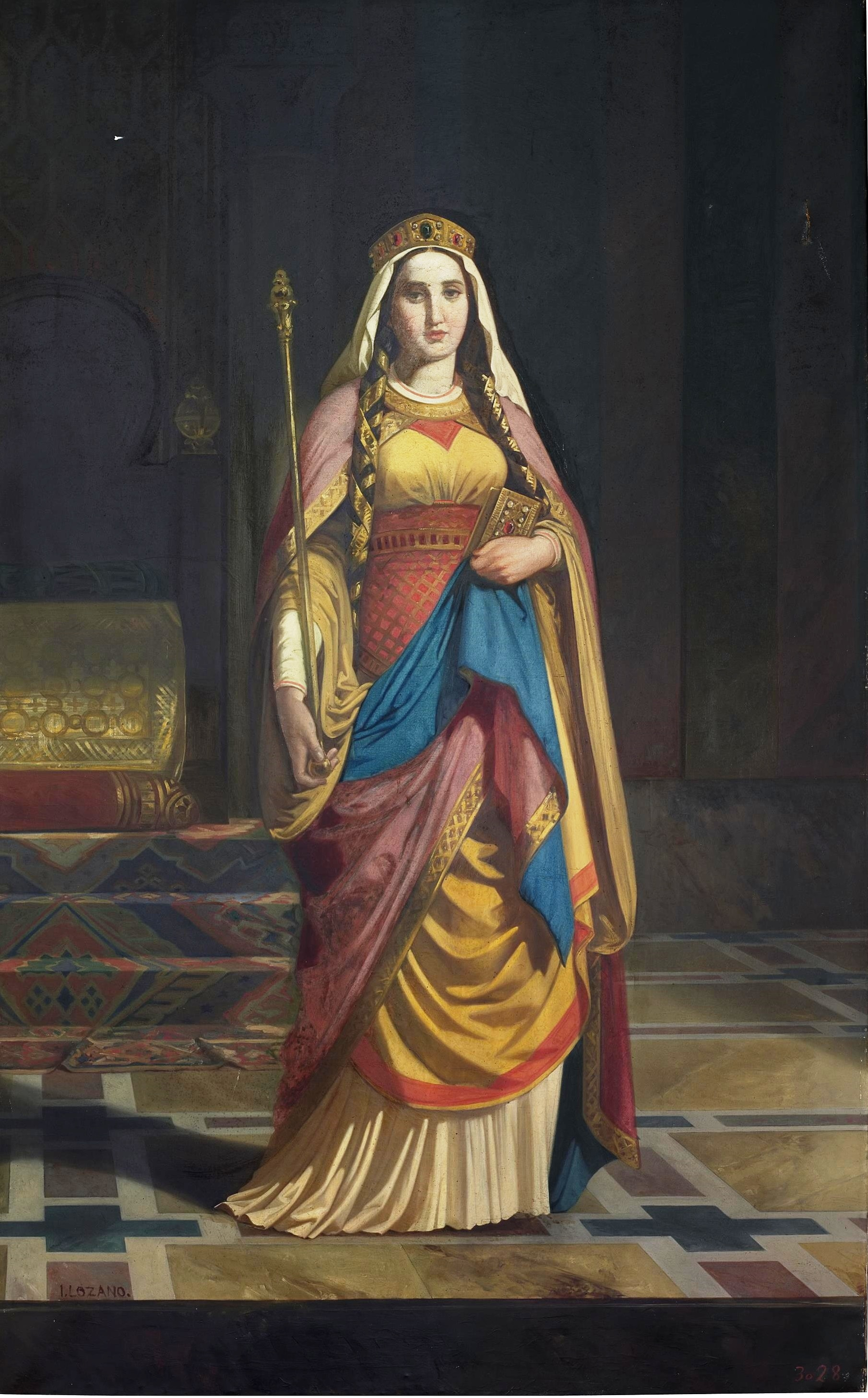
- Spouse: Silo of Asturias
- Parents: Alfonso I of Asturias (father); Ermesinda (mother)
- Relatives: Fruela I of Asturias (brother); Pelagius of Asturias (maternal grandfather); Gaudiosa (maternal grandmother); Favila of Asturias (uncle); Mauregatus (half-brother)

Adosinda was the queen of Asturias during the reign of her husband, Silo, from 774 to 783. She was a daughter of Alfonso I and Ermesinda, daughter of the first Asturian king, Pelayo. She was a sister of Fruela I.

Her husband probably succeeded in becoming King because he was related by marriage to both of the previous ruling families. Some scholars have even posited a matrilineal succession. Since she gave Silo no heir, her nephew Alfonso II was proclaimed king upon Silo's death. Alfonso II was expelled from the realm by Mauregatus, who was an illegitimate son of Alfonso I and thus Adosinda's half-brother. On 26 November 783, Adosinda was put in the monastery of San Juan de Pravia, where she lived out the rest of her life.

== Biography ==
Adosinda was a daughter of King Alfonso I of Asturias (the Catholic) and Queen Ermesinda. Her paternal grandfather was Pedro de Cantabria and her maternal grandparents were King Pelagius (Don Pelayo in Spanish) and Queen Gaudiosa. Adosinda's brother was King Fruela I de Asturias (called The Cruel), who succeeded their father to the throne. After King Fruela I was assassinated in 768, Adosinda feared for the life of her nephew Alfonso, son of her late brother and so sent him to the monastery of San Julián de Samos, in Lugo, in order to give him protection and cultural training.

King Aurelius succeeded to the Asturian throne in 768 and Adosinda lived in the Asturian court under his protection. During her stay, she met Silo, a rich man from the area of Pravia. She chose him as her husband, an unusual move for the time. After the death of Aurelius of Asturias from natural causes in 774, Silo became King of Asturias with Adosinda as Queen consort. They ruled from 774 to 783, in a "peaceful reign of nine years."

Upon the death of her husband without any heirs, Adosinda intervened in the election of his successor to appoint her nephew, Alfonso, the son of King Fruela I. However, King Mauregato, her half brother and the illegitimate son of Alfonso I el Católico, seized the throne, leading to Adosinda and her nephew seeking refuge in Alava, with the relatives of his mother Munia of Álava.

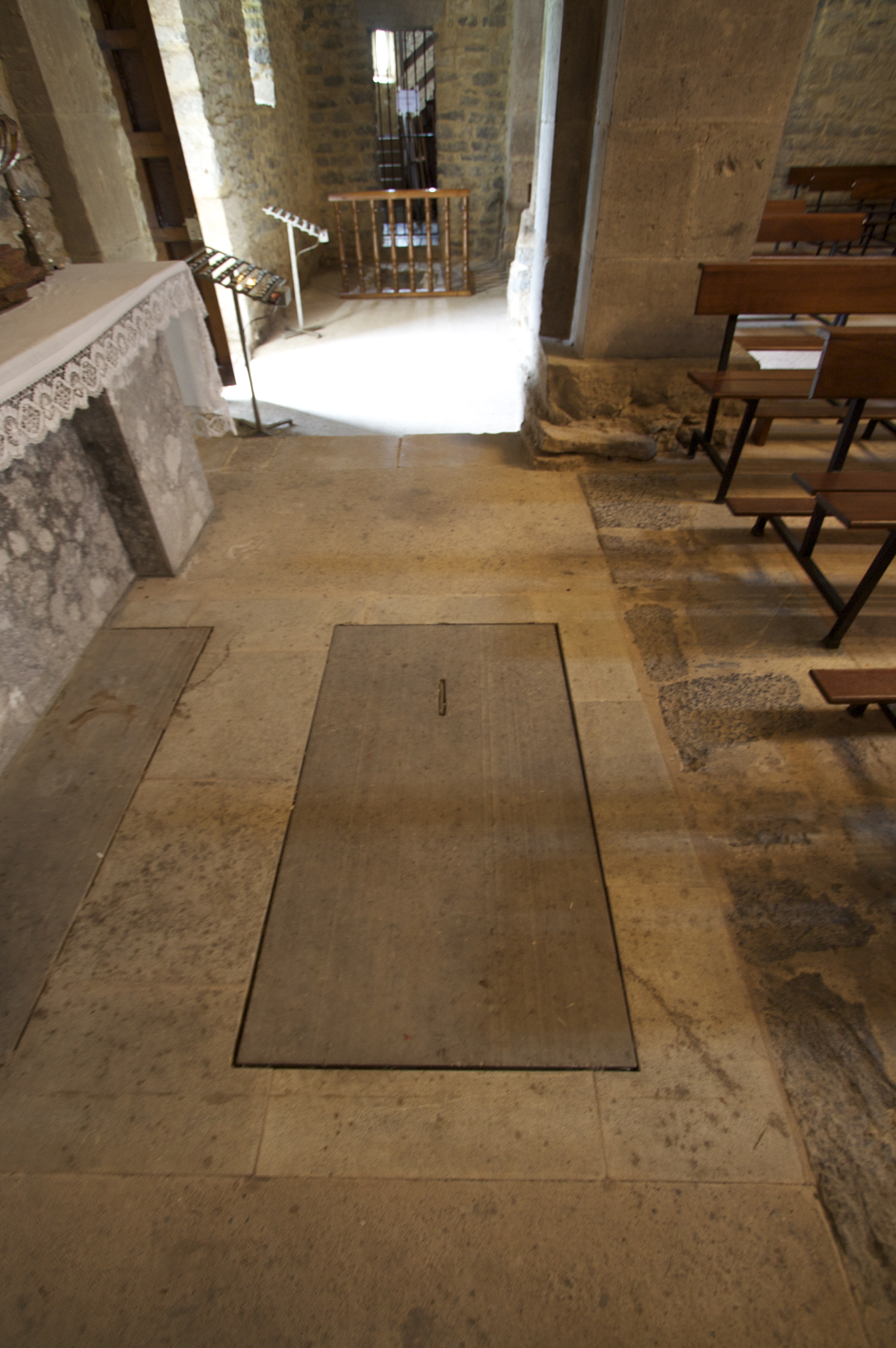
Grave of Adosinda and Silo

Due to the support she gave her nephew, her position in court became insecure and she was forced to enter the Monastery de San Juan de Santianes de Pravia on either 26 November 783 or 785, according to the chronicle of Ambrosio de Morales. She became a nun in the presence of the Abbot Fidel, Beatus of Liébana and Eterio. The latter are known for the controversy with Elipando de Toledo, Archbishop of Toledo.

== Burial ==
After her death, Queen Adosinda's body was interred in a tomb in the Church of San Juan Apóstol y Evangelista, Santianes de Pravia with her husband, King Silo de Asturias. The tomb is still conserved to this day. King Mauregato is also buried in the same church.

Preceded by Munia	Queen Consort of Asturias; 774–783	Succeeded by Usenda
