= Alfonso the Chaste =

Alfonso the Chaste may refer to:

- Alfonso II of Asturias (759–842)
- Alfonso II of Aragon (1157–1196)
