= List of Asturian monarchs =

This is a list of the rulers of the Kingdom of Asturias, a kingdom in the Iberian Peninsula during the Early Middle Ages. It originated as a refuge for Visigothic nobles following the conquest of Iberia by the Umayyad Caliphate. Following the forced abdication of Alfonso III by his sons in 910, the kingdom was split into three: Asturias, León, and Galicia. All three were reunited in 924 under the Kingdom of León.

For later kings, see the list of Leonese monarchs and the list of Galician monarchs. From 1388, the title Prince of Asturias has been used for the heirs to the Castilian and Spanish thrones.

== List ==
Image	Name	Life	Reign	Capital of Asturias	Notes
	Pelagius; Pelayo	c. 685 – 737	714 – 737	Cangas de Onís	By tradition regarded as the first king of Asturias. Elected princeps by local magnates in the old Visigoth manner.
	Favila; Fáfila, Favilac	died 739	737 – 739	Cangas de Onís	Only son of Pelagius. He was elected to princeps on his father’s death. Killed by a bear during a hunt and died childless.
	Alfonso I, the Catholic; Alonso I, el Católico	c. 693 – 757	739 – 757	Cangas de Onís	Husband of Ermesinda, daughter of Pelagius and sister of Favila, and it is through his wife that Alfonso ascended to the throne. First ruler of Asturias definitely to have been known as “king” during his lifetime.
	Fruela I, the Cruel; Fruela I, Froila I, el Cruel	c. 722 – 768	757 – 768	Cangas de Onís	Oldest son of Alfonso I. Assassinated by his own men.
	Aurelius; Aurelio	c. 740 – 774	768 – 774	San Martín	Cousin of Fruela I. Elected by Asturian nobility after the death of his predecessor. There is no record of his having any children.
	Silo	died 783	774 – 783	Pravia	Husband of Adosinda, daughter of Alfonso I and granddaughter of Pelagius. Elected by Asturian nobility after the death of his predecessor. Matrilineal succession is thought to have had a part in his election.
	Mauregatus, the Usurper; Mauregato, el Usurpador	c. 719 – 789	783 – 789	Pravia	Illegitimate son of Alfonso I. In spite of the election of Alfonso II as the successor to Silo, Mauregato was able to assemble an army and seize the throne. Mauregatus died of natural causes.
	Bermudo I, the Deacon; Bermudo I, Vermudo I, el Diácono	c. 750 – 797	788 – 791	Pravia	Brother of Aurelius. He was elected king by palatine officials. He abdicated after a defeat in battle, possibly under duress. He reportedly lived a long time after as a monk.
	Alfonso II, the Chaste; Alfonso II, el Casto	c. 760 – 842	791 – 842	Oviedo	Son of Fruela I. First elected king in 783. Although overthrown by Mauregatus, he escaped and avoided being killed. In 791, he was elected king again after the abdication of Bermudo I. Alfonso died without children.
	Nepotian		842 – 842	Oviedo	Seized power and briefly ruled after the death of Alfonso II, when Alfonso’s designated heir, Ramiro I was not present. On Ramiro’s return, Nepotian was deposed, blinded, and imprisoned.
	Ramiro I	c. 790 – 850	842 – 850	Oviedo	Son of Bermudo I. Designated heir of Alfonso II.
	Ordoño I	821 – 866	850 – 866	Oviedo	Son of Ramiro I, succeeding his father without election.
	Alfonso III, the Great; Alfonso III, el Magno	852 – 910	866 – 910	Oviedo	Son of Ordoño I. Alfonso succeeded his father in that throne. The circumstances are uncertain, but after his death, Alfonso’s kingdom was divided among his three sons, with his eldest, García I receiving the new kingdom of León, his middle son Ordoño receiving the new kingdom of Galicia, and his youngest Fruela what remained of Asturias.
	Fruela II, the Leprous; Fruela II, Froila II, el Leproso	875 – 925	910 – 924	Oviedo	Youngest son of Alfonso III, and younger brother to García I and Ordoño II. Fruela was given the remnants of the kingdom of Asturias, from which León and Galicia had been created. On the death of Ordoño II in 924, who had inherited León from García I in 914, Fruela became ruler of all three kingdoms created from that of his father. Fruela is usually considered the last King of Asturias, as under his rule Asturias was folded into León.

== Family tree ==
Pelagius; King of Asturias; 685–718-737	Gaudiosa	Peter; Duke of Cantabria ?-730
Froiluba	Favila; King of Asturias ?-737–739	Ermesinda ≈720/730—?	Alfonso I the Catholic; King of Asturias ≈693–739-757	Fruela of Cantabria ?-≈758
Munia of Álava ≈740-780	Fruela I the Cruel; King of Asturias ≈722–757-768	Vimarano ?-765	Adosinda ?-785	Silo; King of Asturias ?-774-783	Mauregato; King de Asturias ?-783-789	Creusa ?-789	Bermudo I the Deacon; King of Asturias ≈750–788– 791-797	Aurelius; King of Asturia ≈740–768-774
Alfonso II the Chaste; King of Asturias; 760–791–842	? Urraca	Ramiro I King of Asturias ≈790–842-850	Paterna
Ordoño I King of Asturias; 821–850-866
Sancho I Garcés; King of Pamplona ≈860–905–925	Nuño; Ordóñez	Alfonso III the Great; King of Asturias; 848–866-910	Jimena of Pamplona ?-912	Bermudo; Ordóñez
Sancha; Sánchez of Pamplona	Ramiro ?-929	García I King of León ≈871–910-914	Muniadona
Elvira; Menéndez d. 921	Ordoño II; King of Galicia ≈873–910–924; King of León r.914–924	Aragonta; González	Nunilo	Fruela II; King of Asturias ≈875–910–925; King of León and Galicia r.924–925	Urraca bint Abd Allah
Kings of the Kingdom of Leon	Alfonso; Fróilaz the Hunchback; King of León ?-925–926-932	Ramiro; Froilaz	Ordoño; Froilaz

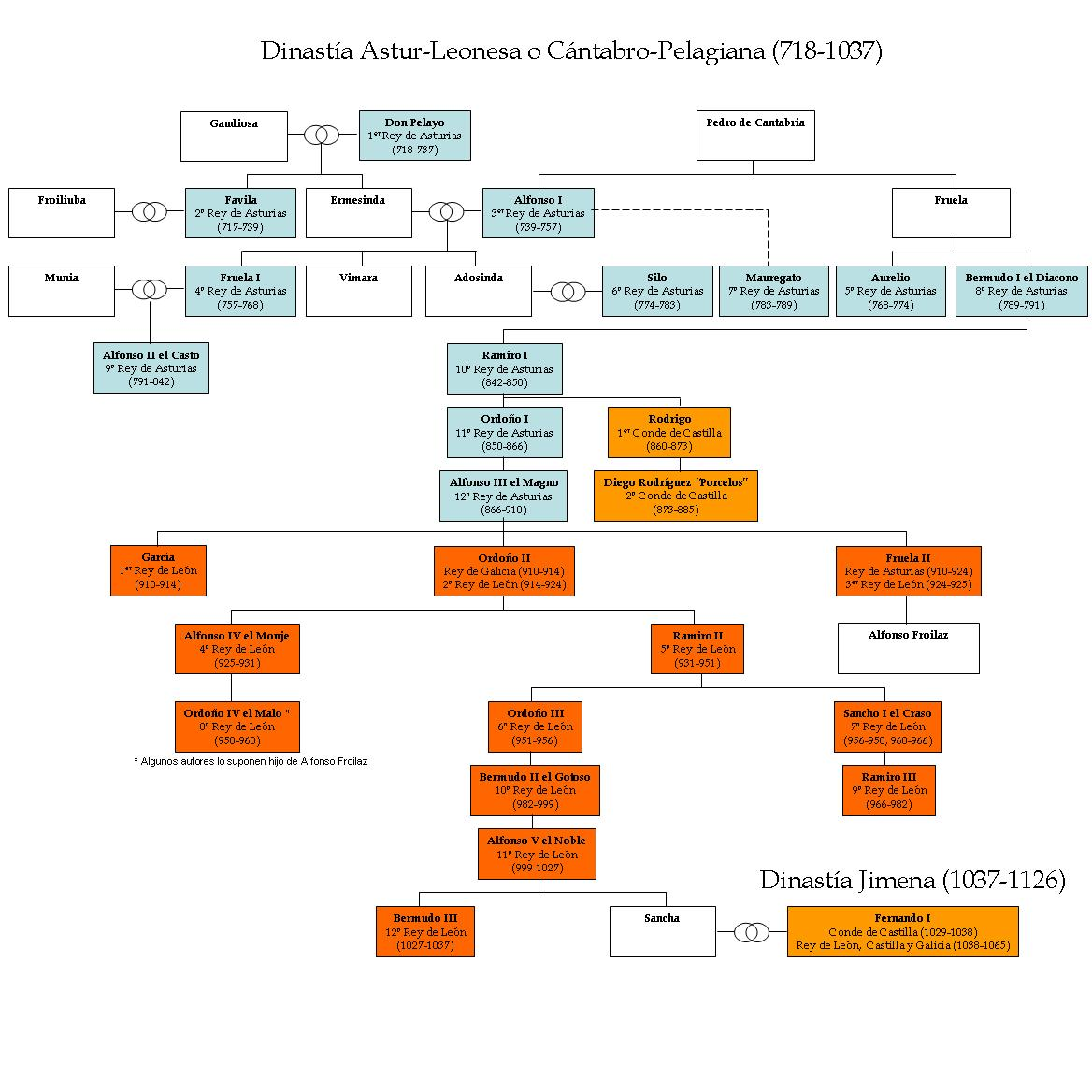
Family tree of the Asturian kings

== See also ==
- Kingdom of Asturias
- Astur-Leonese dynasty
