= Cosgaya =

- Town
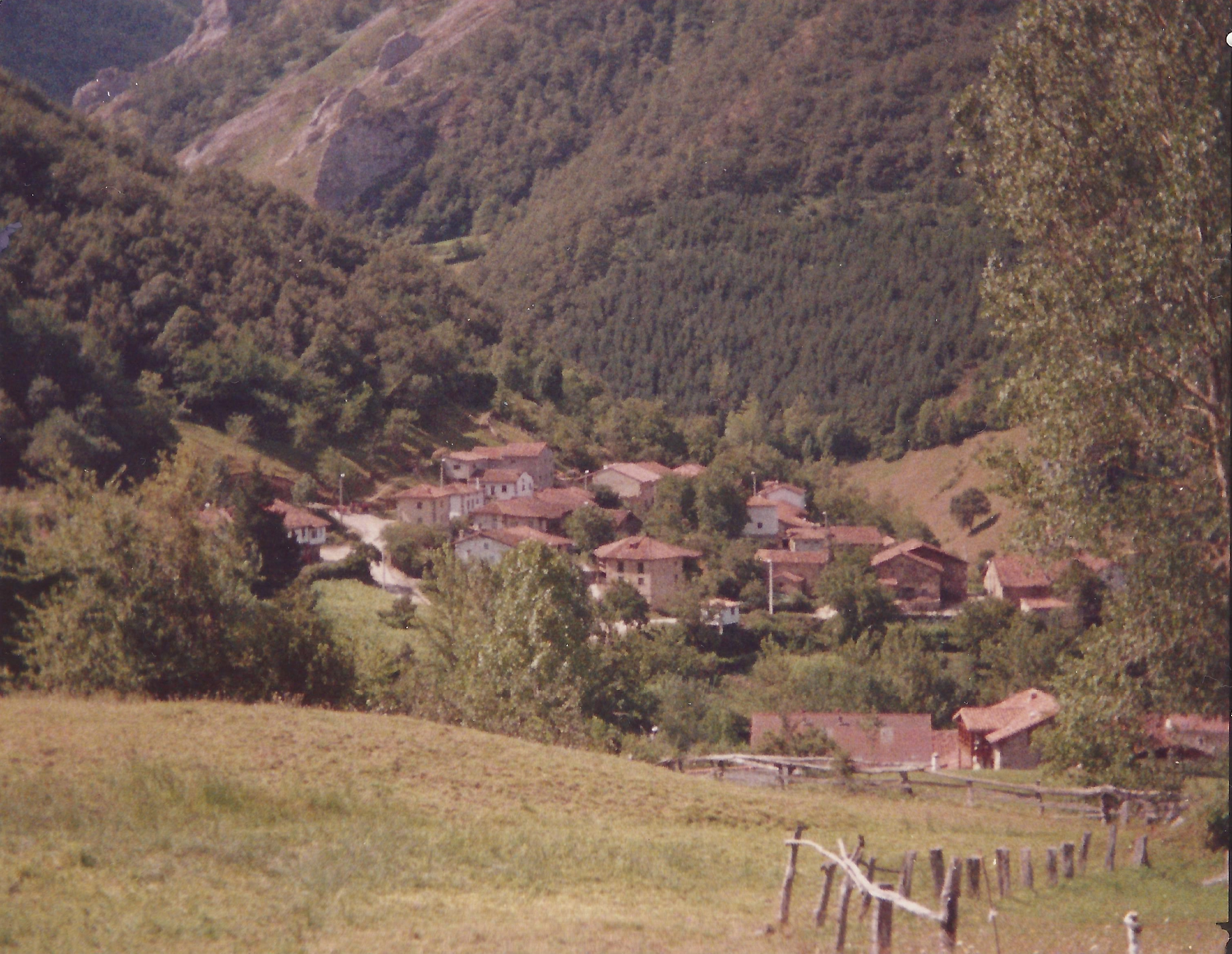
- Cosgaya from the mountain

- Location of Cosgaya

- Location in Spain
- Coordinates: 43°6′32″N 4°43′35″W
- Country: Spain
- Autonomous community: Cantabria
- Province: Cantabria
- Municipality: Camaleño
- Elevation: 530 m (1,740 ft)

Population (2008)
  - Total: 52
- Time zone: UTC+1 (CET)
  - Summer (DST): UTC+2 (CEST)
- Postal code: 39582

Cosgaya is a Spanish town in the municipality of Camaleño, situated in the comarca of Liébana, located in the furthermost area to the west of Cantabria. The town lies on the right bank of the Deva River. In 2006 it had a population of 47 (INE).

It is divided in three rural neighbourhoods: Areños, Treviño and Cosgaya

== Notable people ==
- Gaudiosa, 8th-century queen of Asturias

== Gallery ==
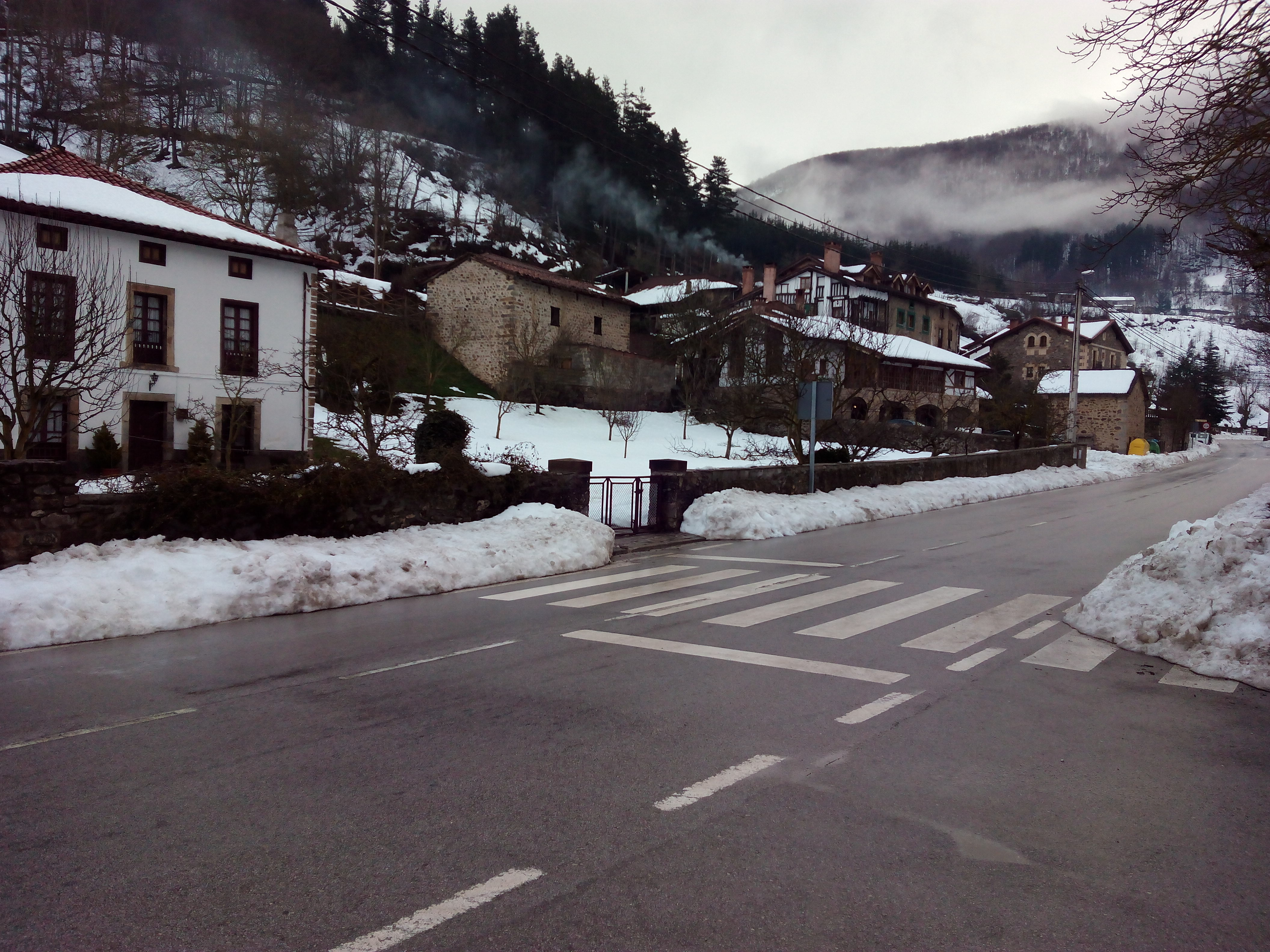
Houses in Cosgaya

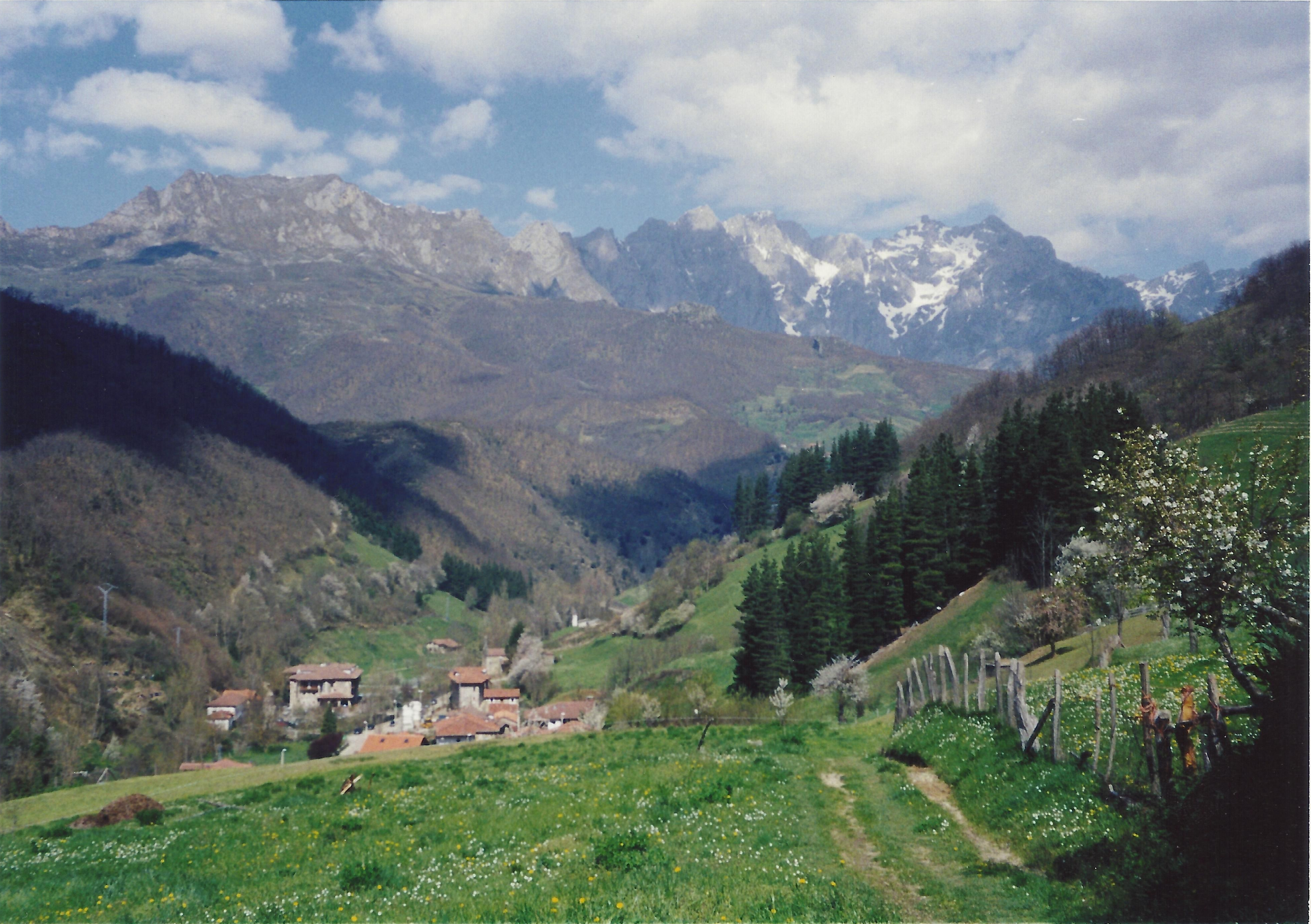
Neighbourhood of Areños
