= Ermesinda =

Queen consort of Asturias

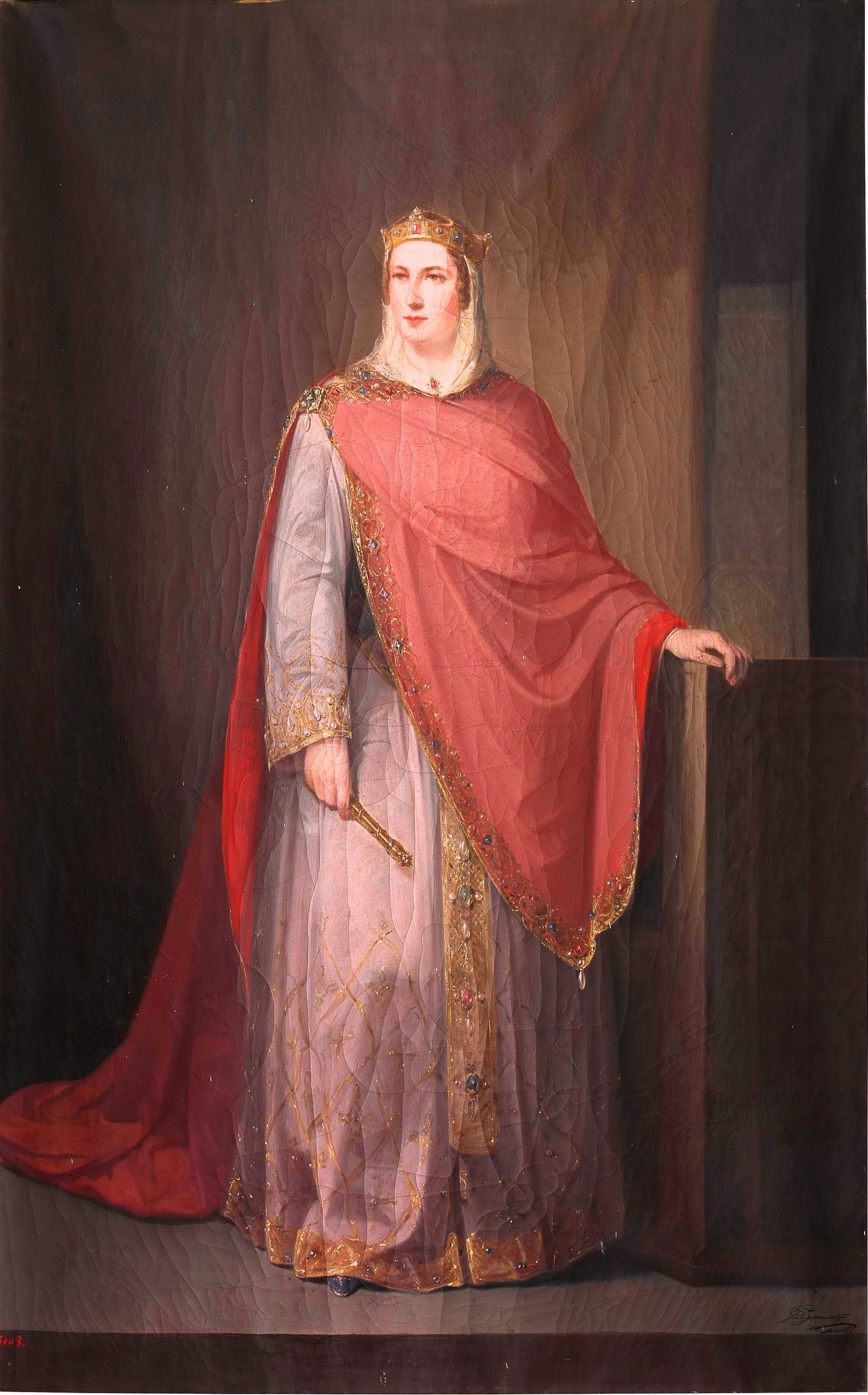
Ermesinda of Asturias, by Francisco Joaquín Gutiérrez de la Vega. 1854. (Museo del Prado, Madrid).

Ermesinda (c. 720 or c. 730 – ?; alternatively Ormisenda, Ermisenda, Ermesinde, Ermessenda) was queen consort of the Kingdom of Asturias, wife of King Alfonso I of Asturias ("Alfonso the Catholic"), who claimed right to the throne through his marriage to her . She was the daughter of King Pelagius of Asturias and his queen, Gaudiosa.

== Life ==
The Latin-language Chronicon Albeldense states that Ermesinda was daughter of Pelagius, the first king of Asturias, and his queen, Gaudiosa, and that her brother was Favila, the second king of Asturias. Ermesinda passed her claim on the throne to her husband Alfonso, son of Duke Peter of Cantabria. Alfonso and Ermesinda became king and queen after Favila was mauled to death by a bear in 739.

The exact date of Ermesinda's birth is unknown, but appears to have been between 720 and 730. She was presumably born in Asturias where her father was king, although (as is common for the era) there is no documentation of that. The date of her death is likewise unknown.

== Burial ==
After Ermesinda's death, her body was entombed in the monastery of Santa María near the municipality of Cangas de Onís, according to Bishop Sebastián of Salamanca and the Estoria de España (a.k.a. Primera Crónica General). The Cordoban chronicler Ambrosio de Morales identifies this with the monastery of Covadonga. Her husband Alfonso I was buried in the same monastery. 16th-century chronicler Ambrosio de Morales gave the following description of the tomb of King Alfonso I and Ermesinda, located in the Santa Cueva de Covadonga ("Holy Cave of Covadonga"):

Their tomb is the one at the head of the church facing the main altar in a small cave. It is carved, in part. It is a smooth stone sarcophagus, whose covering is a single piece of stone, four feet wide at the head and two at the feet, like a coffin, but with a flat rather than a vaulted covering. Its length, twelve feet and three in height.

The tomb in the Santa Cueva de Covadonga in which Alfonso and Ermesinda are believed to be buried is engraved with the following epitaph:

HERE LIES THE CATHOLIC AND HOLY KING DON ALONSO THE FIRST AND HIS WIFE DOÑA ERMENISINDA SISTER OF DON FAVILA WHOM HE SUCCEEDED. THIS KING WON MANY VICTORIES OVER THE MOORS. HE DIED IN CANGAS IN THE YEAR 757.

== Marriage and descendants ==
Ermesinda had three children, all by her husband King Alfonso I:

- Fruela I of Asturias (722–768). Upon the death of Alfonso I, Fruela became King of Asturias. He was entombed with his wife Queen Munia of Álava, at the church of San Salvador in Oviedo, which he founded.
- Vimarano (?-765). Assassinated by his brother King Fruela.
- Adosinda. Wedded Silo, sixth king of Asturias. She was entombed with her husband in the Church of San Juan Apóstol y Evangelista, Santianes de Pravia.
