= Iglesia de Jesús de Nazareno (Cudillero) =

- Iglesia de Jesús de Nazareno (Cudillero)
- Location: Asturias, Spain

The Iglesia de Jesús de Nazareno is a neo-Romanesque style, Roman Catholic church in Cudilleros, in the community of Asturias, Spain.

Construction of this church was patronized in the late 19th-early 20th centuries by an Asturian historian and art patron, Selgas Fortunato. The inauguration of the church in 1914 was attended by the Princess and Princess of Asturias Doña Isabel de Borbón. The church was built at the site of a late 9th century church. The new church had stained glass windows made contemporary with inauguration.

== Crypt ==
The crypt was designated by Fortunato as his family burial vault. He placed in the space a Pre-Romanesque altar from the 8th century, which had been erected by King Silo of Asturias in the former church of Santianes de Pravia. The altar was purchased in 1905 by Fortunato of Selgas Pravia for 25 pesetas in a tavern where he served on board.

At the sides are also preserved two Romanesque cancel, also from Santianes of Pravia In early 2008 the altar and the cancels were transferred to a room in the palace.

== See also ==
- Asturian art
- Catholic Church in Spain
- Churches in Asturias
- List of oldest church buildings
