= Vimarano =

Infante of the Kingdom of Asturias (c. 725–765)

- Infante de Asturias
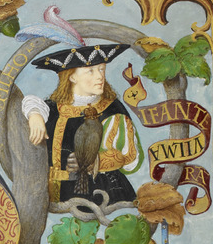
- Born: c. 725
- Died: 765 (aged around 40); Asturias
- Issue: Vermudo
- Dynasty: Astur-Leonese dynasty
- Father: Alfonso I of Asturias
- Mother: Ermesinda

Vimarano (Asturian: Vimaranu; c. 725–765), was an infante of the Kingdom of Asturias. He was killed by his older brother, King Fruela I.

== Biography ==
Vimarano was the second son of King Alfonso I and his wife Ermesinda. It is said that he was a very handsome man, a great gentleman, and loved by all.

In 765, King Fruela killed his own brother because Vimarano was earning the sympathy of many and was capable of disputing the throne. The writers of the Estoria de España claim that Vimarano was killed by his brother's own hands. After the death of Vimarano, Fruela raised Vimarano's son Vermudo as his own son. Fruela was killed by his relatives in 768 out of vengeance for the murder of Vimarano.
