= Church of Santa Cruz de Cangas de Onís =

Roman Catholic chapel in Asturias, Spain

Church of the True Cross of Cangas de Onís Iglesia de la Santa Cruz de Cangas de Onís (in Spanish)
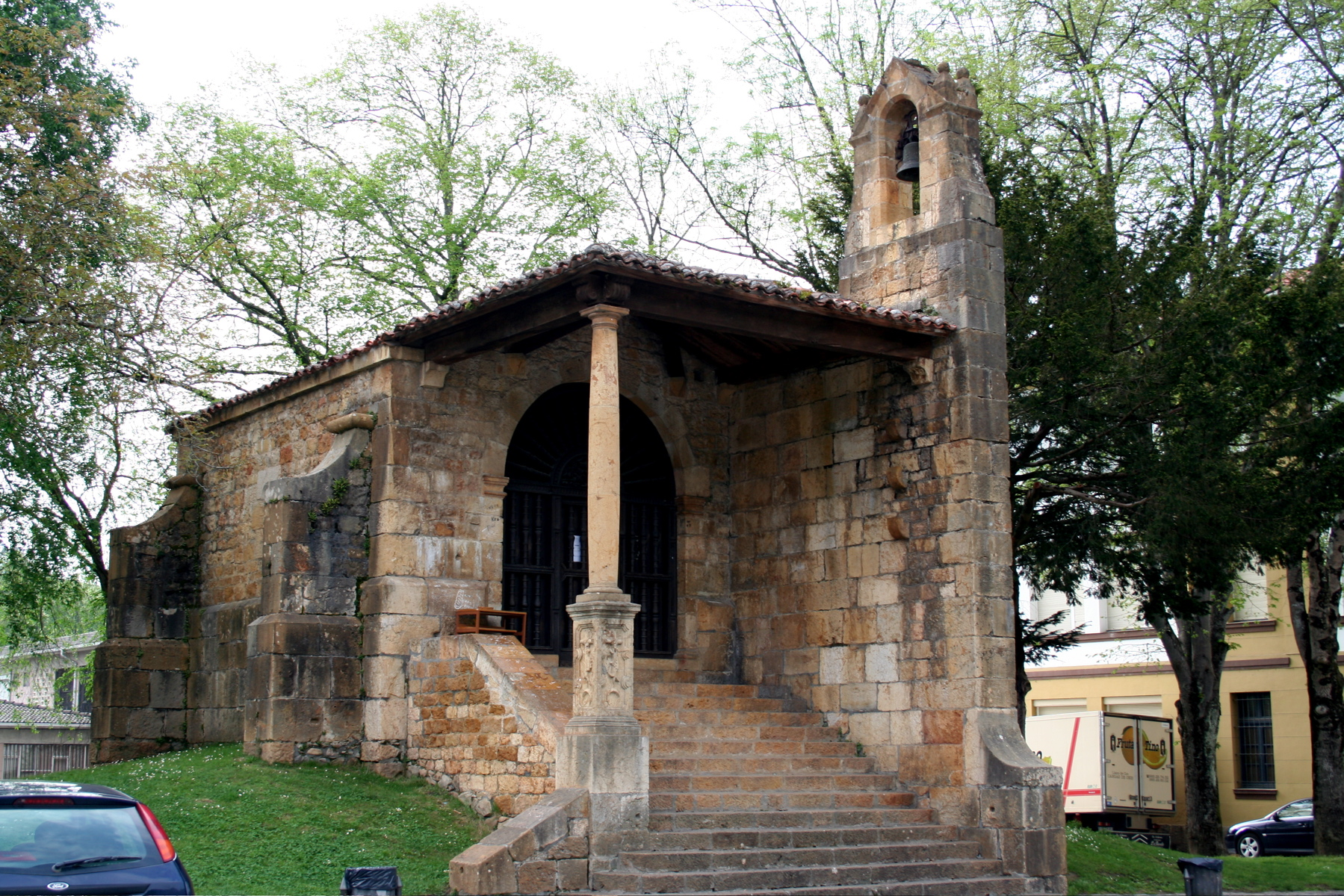
- The entrance to the chapel today

Religion
- Affiliation: Roman Catholic
- Province: Asturias
- Ecclesiastical or organizational status: Chapel
- Year consecrated: 27 October 737

Location
- Location: Cangas de Onís, Spain
- Interactive map of Church of the True Cross of Cangas de Onís; Iglesia de la Santa Cruz de Cangas de Onís (in Spanish)
- Coordinates: 43°21′9.7″N 5°7′49.4″W

Architecture
- Type: Chapel
- Style: Pre-Romanesque
- Groundbreaking: 437

Santa Cruz de Cangas de Onís is a small Roman Catholic chapel in Cangas de Onís, the first capital of the Kingdom of Asturias, in what is now northern Spain. It was founded on an artificial mound (a pagan dolmen) by Favila, second king of Asturias, and his queen, Froiliuba. It was begun in 737 and consecrated that same year on 27 October according to its original foundation stone, which has been called the first literary monument of the Reconquista.

Santa Cruz originally housed the Cruz de la Victoria, an oak cross supposedly carried by Pelagius, Favila's father, at the Battle of Covadonga. It was probably the first church constructed after the Islamic invasion of Spain in 711.

The church was completely rebuilt on two occasions. First in 1632 and again after its destruction in the Spanish Civil War (1936). Then, local authorities decided to uncover the dolmen beneath it, which had been obscured by a church since the fourth century, when the first chapel was put up on that site. Of the original building only the foundation stone survives.

== Burials ==
- Favila of Asturias and his wife Froiluba

== Images ==
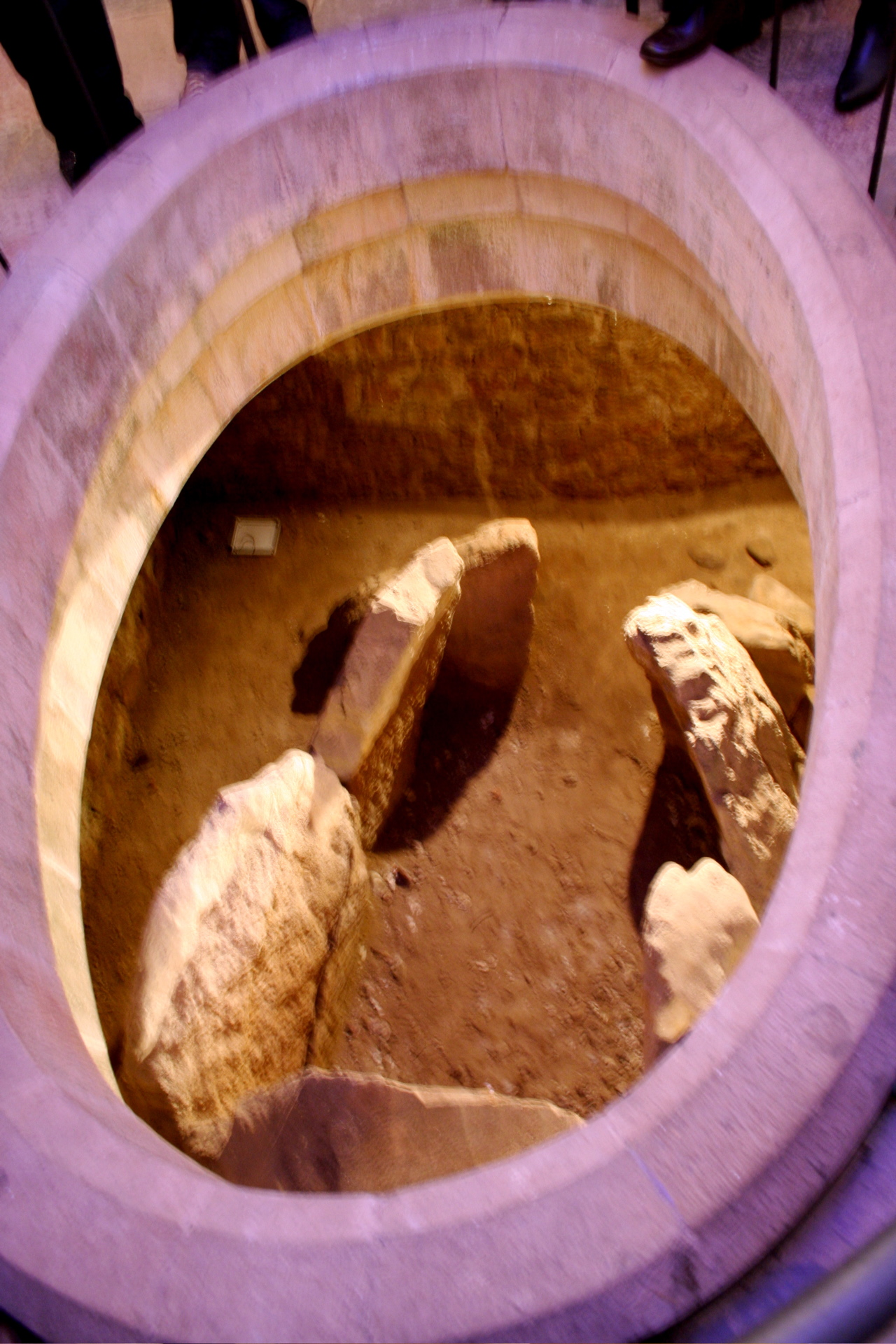
The dolmen, now visible through the chapel floor.

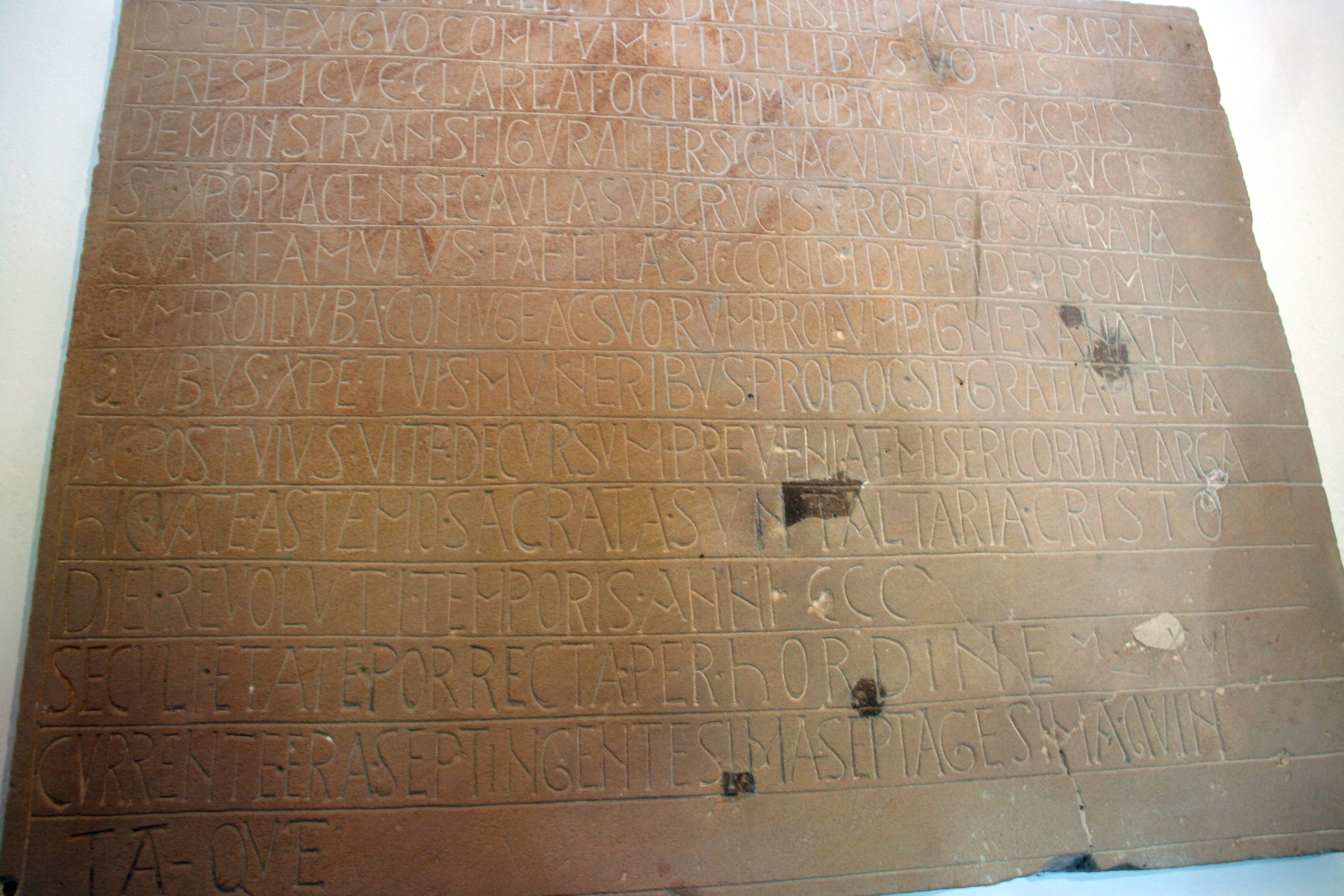
The foundation stone reads (in translation from the original Latin):
. . . and his children, for whom by it, O Christ, by your sacrifice be all your grace, and after the course of this life may they reach your generous mercy. Here were consecrated altars to Christ by the priest Asterius, on the three-hundredth day of the year in the sixth age of the world in the Era 775.

== See also ==
- Asturian architecture
- Catholic Church in Spain
