= Iglesia de Santa Eulalia (Abamia) =

Coordinates: 43°20′22″N 5°03′35″W

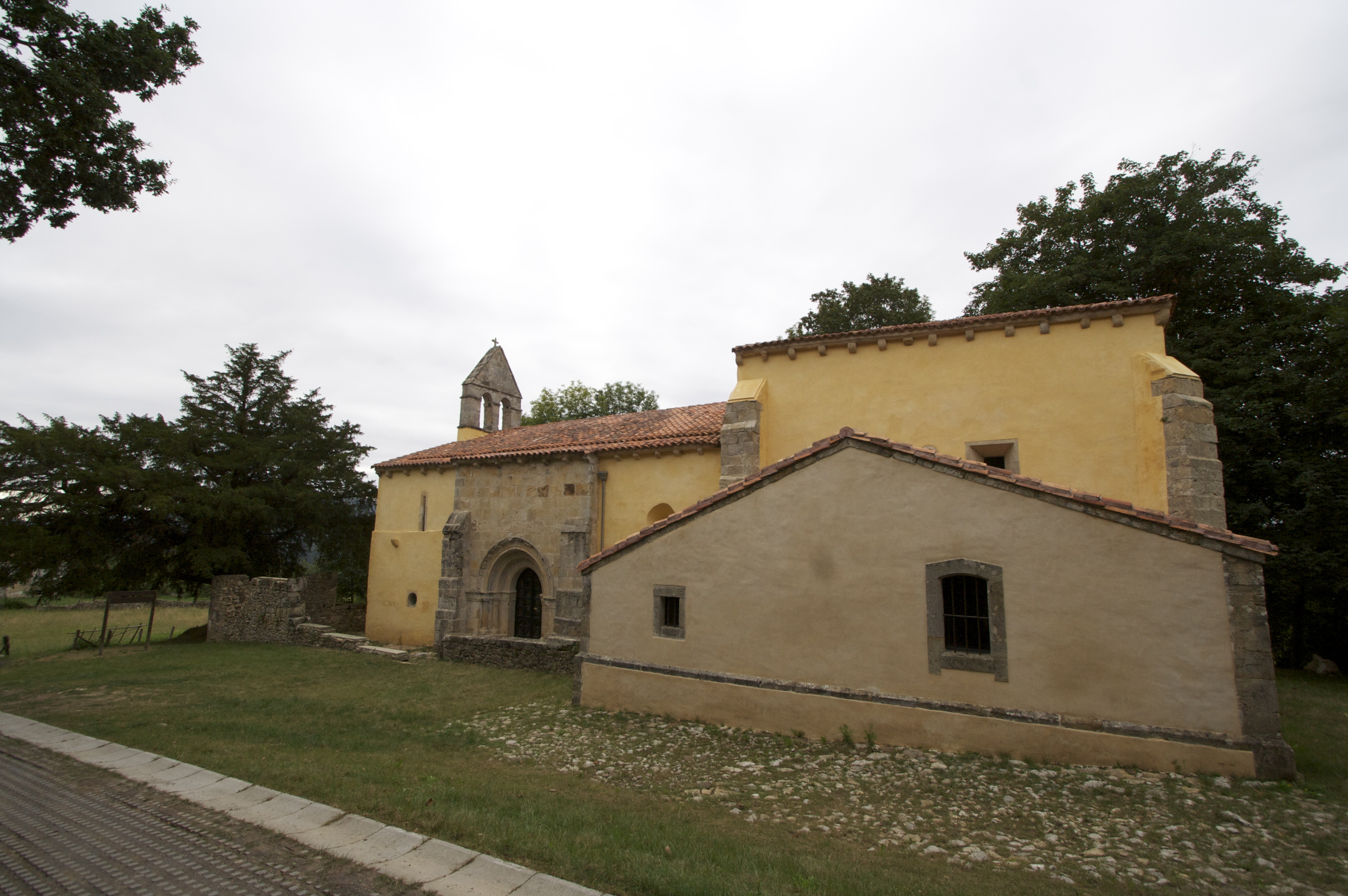
- Iglesia de Santa Eulalia (Abamia)
- Location: Asturias, Spain

Iglesia de Santa Eulalia (Abamia) is a church in Asturias, Spain, in the vicinity of Covadonga.

Pelagius of Asturias, who in 718 conquered a Moorish army in Covadonga to begin the so-called Spanish Reconquista, and his wife were originally buried here.
