= Munia of Álava =

- Queen consort of Asturias
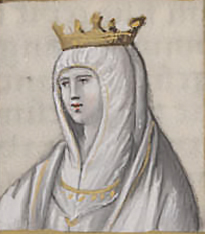
- Born: Álava
- Burial: Oviedo Cathedral
- Spouse: Fruela I of Asturias
- Issue: Alfonso II of Asturias, Jimena
- Dynasty: Astur-Leonese dynasty (by marriage)

Munia of Álava (fl. 760s) was Queen Consort of Aturias as the wife of Fruela I of Asturias.

== Biography ==
Munia of Álava was born in Álava.

The early tenth century Chronicle of Alfonso III in its first Rotense version records that after a rebellion against Fruela I of Asturias by the Basques was suppressed, the Asturian King "took from among them his wife, named Munia, with whom he fathered his son Alfonso.” When she was taken to Asturias, she was "quandam adulescentulam," meaning a "young girl."

Spanish scholar Claudio Sánchez-Albornoz suggested that the royal couple would have resided in Oviedo, where their son Alfonso II of Asturias was born in 759 or 760.

According to legends in 13th-century chronicles, Munia of Álava was also the mother of a daughter Jimena (or Ximena), who secretly married Sancho Díaz, count of Saldaña and became the mother of Bernardo del Carpio.

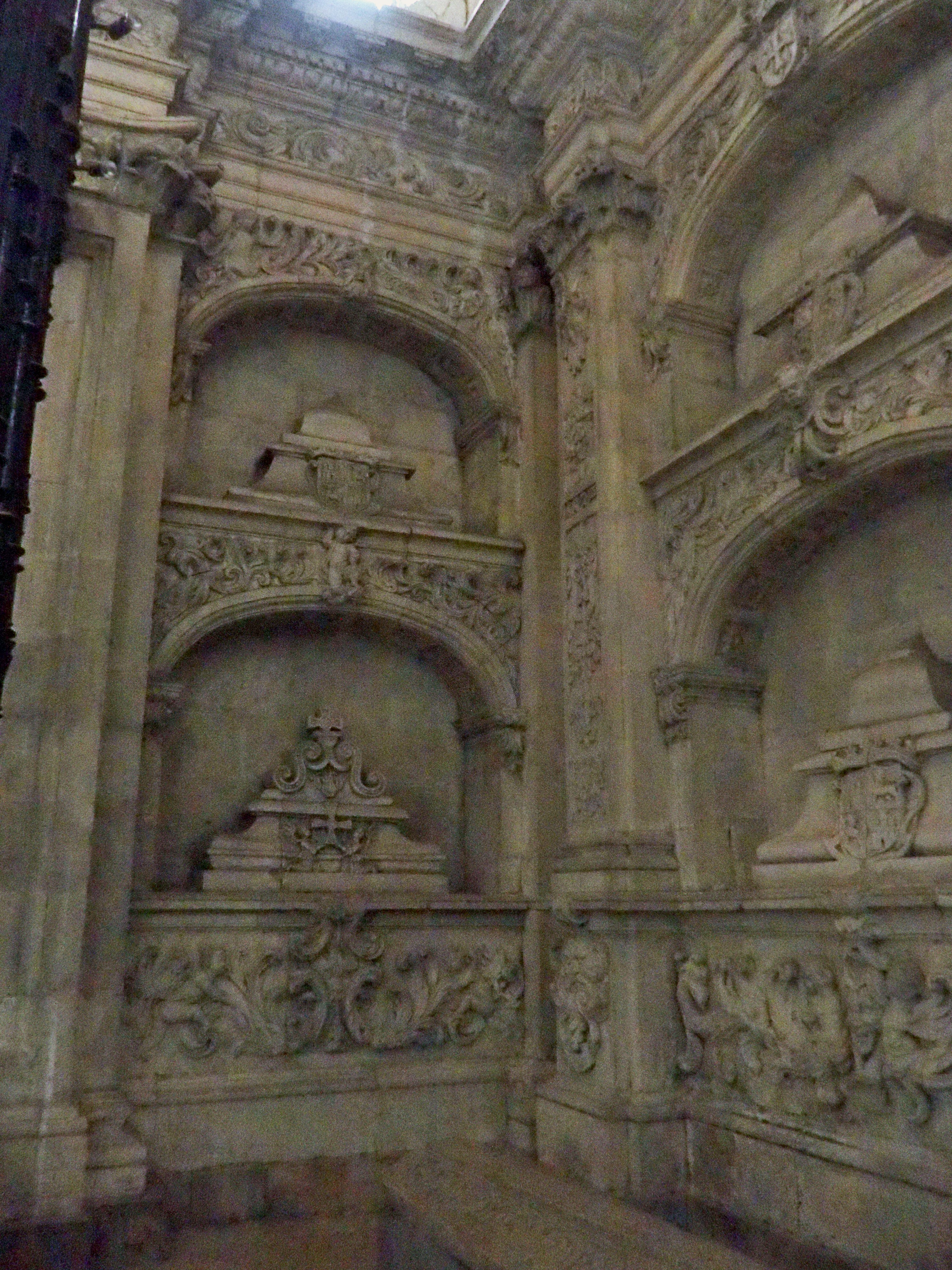
Oviedo Cathedral

Munia of Álava's husband was assassinated in 768 in Cangas de Onís and she fled with her children to the Monastery of San Xulián de Samos. Her husband was succeeded by his cousin, Aurelius of Asturias (rather than her son) who reigned three years. During the reign of Alfonso II's aunt Adosinda's husband Silo of Asturias, Alfonso was the governor of the royal palace. On Silo's death, Alfonso was elected king by Adosinda's allies, but the magnates raised his uncle Mauregatus to the throne instead. Alfonso fled to Álava where he "took refuge among his mother's relatives." He later became King of Asturias in 791.

Álava's date of death is unknown, but she and her husband are buried together in Oviedo Cathedral.
