= Sack of Lisbon (798) =

Sack of Lisbon by Alfonso II of Asturias

- Part of Reconquista
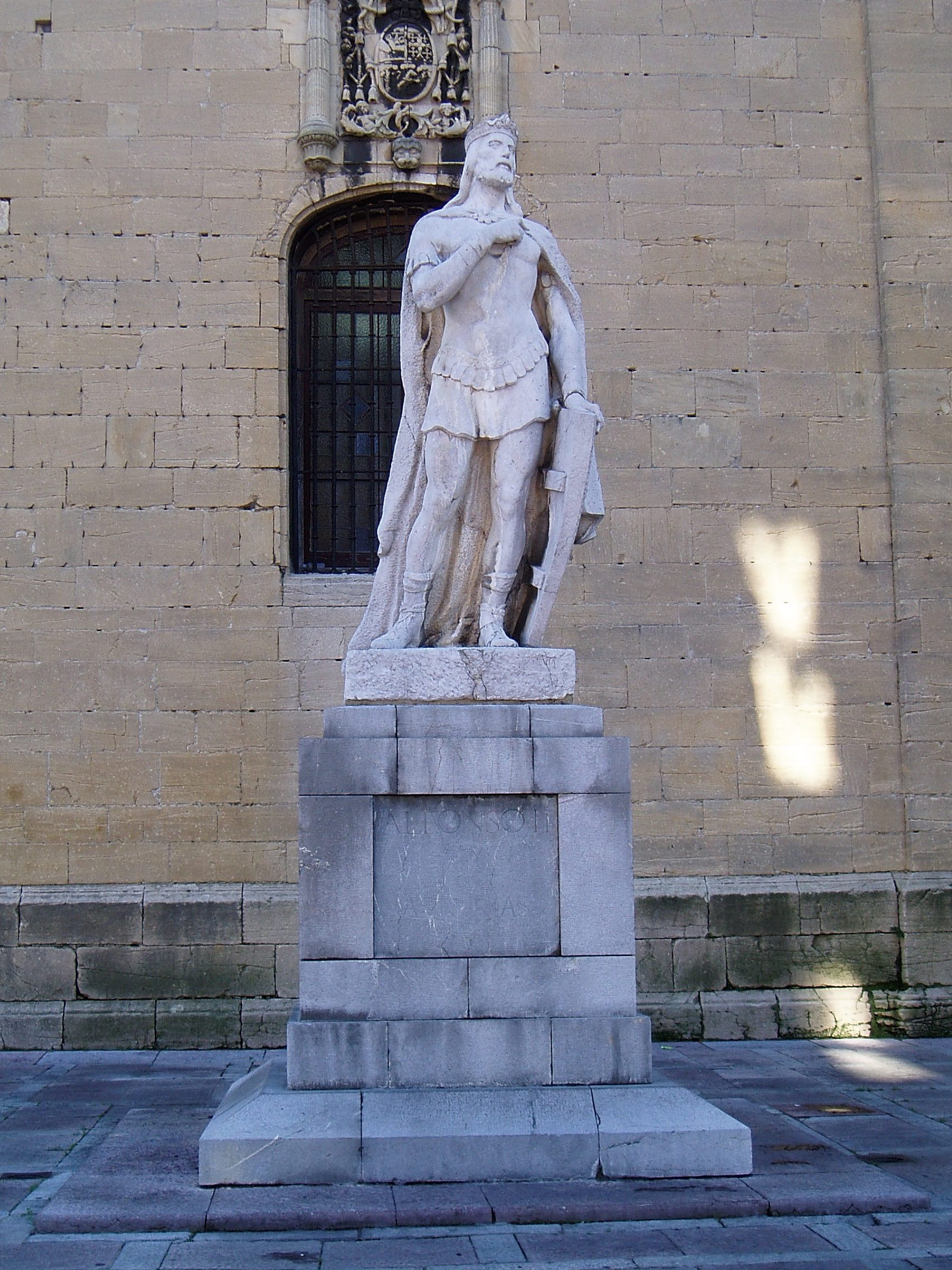
- Statue of Alfonso II of Asturias by Víctor Hevia
Date	798
Location	Lisbon, Emirate of Córdoba
Result	Asturian victory

Belligerents
Kingdom of Asturias	Emirate of Córdoba

Commanders and leaders
Alfonso II of Asturias	Unknown

The Sack of Lisbon was an expedition to Lisbon led by Alfonso II of Asturias. The expedition was successful and he secured Galicia up to the Minho. However, he abandoned the city the same day. According to Mariano Torrente, it was revenge for the military incursions sent by the Emir of Córdoba against the Kingdom of Asturias after the Battle of Lutos.

== The expedition ==
Alfonso II of Asturias, since he had an alliance with the Frankish Kingdom, decided to invade the western part of the peninsula to distract the Moorish forces, already broken by their civil war. He crossed the Duero, reached the Tagus and, after some resistance, captured and sacked Lisbon. However, he abandoned the city the same day.

== Aftermath ==
After the sacking, Alfonso II sent to Charlemagne coats of mail, mules, Moorish captives and a tent from a Saracen chief. Lisbon may had remained abandoned for a decade until Tumlus started a rebellion and was executed by the Emirate of Córdoba in 808.

== See also ==
- Asturias in the Reconquista

== Bibliography ==
- Comte de Ségur, Philippe-Paul (1835). Historia moderna: Historia de España (in Spanish). Imprenta de la Real Compañia.
- Livermore, H. V. (1971). The Origins of Spain and Portugal. Allen and Unwin. ISBN 9780049460058.
- Paolella, Christopher (2020). Human Trafficking in Medieval Europe. Amsterdam University Press. ISBN 9789048551552.
- Cavanah Murphy, James (1797). Voyage en Portugal (in French). Denné.
- Rábade Obradó, María del Pilar (2005). La dinámica política (in Spanish). Ediciones AKAL. ISBN 978-84-7090-433-2.
- Rivero, Isabel (1982). Compendio de historia medieval española (in Spanish). Ediciones AKAL. ISBN 9788470901256.
- Calvo y Madroño, Ismael (2006). DESCRIPCION GEOGRAFICA, HISTORICA Y ESTADISTICA DE LA PROVINCIA DE ZAMORA (in Spanish). Editorial MAXTOR. ISBN 9788497612968.
- Fletcher, John (1852). Studies on Slavery. J. Warner.
- Collins, Roger (1989). The Arab Conquest of Spain: 710 - 797. John Wiley & Sons. ISBN 9780631194057.
- Ganshof, François Louis (1971). The Carolingians and the Frankish Monarchy: Studies in Carolingian History. Cornell University Press. ISBN 9780801406355.
- J. Hüffer, Hermann (1933). La idea imperial española (in Spanish). Centro de Intercambio Intelectual Germano-Español.
- Iradiel Murugarren, Paulino (2009). Historia medieval de la España cristiana (in Spanish). ISBN 9788437625560.
