= Astur-Leonese dynasty =

Ruling family in Spain

Astur-Leonese dynasty Dinastía cántabra-pelagiana
- Iberian dynasty
- Country: Kingdom of Asturias/León
- Origin: Duchy of Cantabria and Kingdom of Asturias
- Founded: 718–722
- Founder: Peter of Cantabria
- Final ruler: Bermudo III of León
- Titles: Duke of Cantabria; King of Asturias; King of León; King of Galicia
- Dissolution: 1037

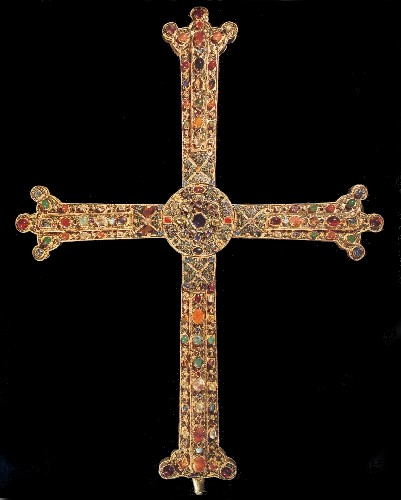
The Victory Cross, a symbol of the Astur-Leonese dynasty

The Asturian or Astur-Leonese dynasty (Spanish dinastía asturiana or asturleonesa, Asturian dinastía asturllionesa), known in Arabic as the Banī Adhfūnsh ("sons of Alfonso"), was the ruling family of the kingdom of Asturias and León from 739 until 1037. Under their rule, the Astur-Leonese kingdom went from a small mountain enclave to one of the dominant powers in Hispania.

The first ruling family of Asturias lasted only two generations: Pelagius (718–737) and Fafila (737–739). The latter was succeeded by his brother-in-law, Alfonso I, the son of Duke Peter of Cantabria and husband of Fafila's sister, Ermesinda. He founded a dynasty that was to last almost 300 years.

For the first century, rule alternated between Alfonso's descendants and those of his brother, Fruela of Cantabria. With the death of Alfonso I's grandson, Alfonso II (842), Fruela's descendants took the throne permanently, headed by Ramiro I. At the death of Alfonso III (910), the kingdom was divided between his sons. The 10th century was thus characterized by family infighting, which was only brought to an end by the succession of Bermudo II in 984. During this period, however, the power of the neighbouring Kingdom of Pamplona waxed and in 1034 the Pamplonans captured León. The rule of the dynasty was brought to an end three years later when Bermudo III was killed in battle against his brother-in-law, Ferdinand of Castile (son of Muniadona of Castile and Sancho III of Pamplona from the Jiménez dynasty), who thereafter assumed the throne.

The historiography produced by and for the dynasty, such as the Chronicle of Alfonso III (late 9th century), made Duke Peter a descendant of the Visigothic king Reccared I and stressed the dynasty's supposed Gothic descent.

== Family tree ==
Family tree of the Astur-Leonese dynasty

Pelagius; King of Asturias; 718-737	Peter duke of Cantabria
Favila; King of Asturias; 737-739	Ermesinda	Alfonso I King of Asturias; 739-757	Fruela duke of Cantabria
Silo; King of Asturias; 774-783	Adosinda	Fruela I King of Asturias; 757-768	(illegitimate); Mauregatus; King of Asturias; 783-789	Aurelius; King of Asturias; 768-774	Bermudo I King of Asturias; 789-791 (abd.) † 797
Alfonso II; King of Asturias; 791-842	Peter Theon	Ramiro I King of Asturias; 842-850
Vímara Peres; Count of Portugal; 868-873	Ordoño I King of Asturias; 850-866
Fruela usurper 866	COUNTS OF PORTUGAL	Alfonso III; King of Asturias; 866-909 (abd.) † 910
García I King of León; 909-914	Ordoño II; King of Galicia 909-924 & León 914-924	Fruela II; King of Asturias 909-925; Galicia & León; 924-925	Ramiro pretender
Sancho Ordóñez; King of Galicia; 926-929	Alfonso IV; King of León 926-931 & Galicia 929-931 (abd.) † 933	Ramiro II; King of León; 931-951	Alfonso Fróilaz; King of León; 925-926 (dethr.) † 932
Ordoño IV; King of León; 958-960 (dethr.) † c.962	Urraca Fernández	Ordoño III; King of León; 951-956	Elvira; Ramírez regent	Sancho I King of León; 956-958 (dethr.); 960-966
Bermudo II; King of Galicia 982-999 & León 984-999	Ramiro III; King of León; 966-84 (dethr.) † 985
(illegitimate); Ordoño Bermúdez	Alfonso V King of León; 999-1028	Christina	Ordoño
Sancho Ordóñez (count)	Sancha	Ferdinand I of Castile; King of León from 1037	Jimena Sánchez	Bermudo III; King of León; 1028-1037	Ordoño
