= Church of San Juan Apóstol y Evangelista, Santianes de Pravia =

Church in Asturias, Spain

Church of St. John Apostle and Evangelist Iglesia de San Juan Apóstol y Evangelista (in Spanish)
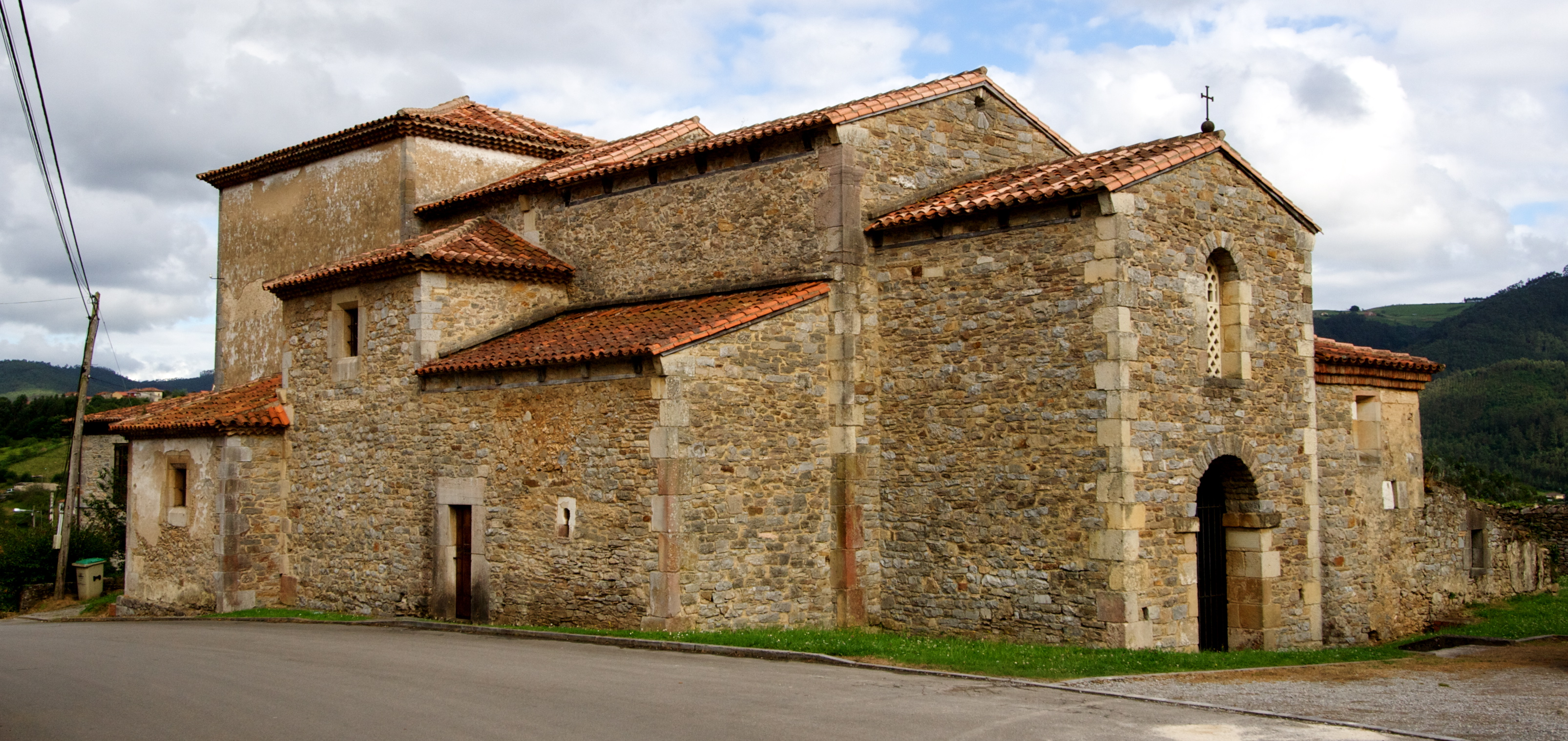

Religion
- Affiliation: Roman Catholic
- Province: Asturias
- Ecclesiastical or organizational status: Church

Location
- Location: Santianes de Pravia, Spain
- Interactive map of Church of St. John Apostle and Evangelist; Iglesia de San Juan Apóstol y Evangelista (in Spanish)
- Coordinates: 43°30′07.02″N 6°05′56.92″W

Architecture
- Type: Church
- Style: Pre-Romanesque
- Groundbreaking: 774
- Completed: 783

Website
- Official Website

St. John Apostle and Evangelist (Spanish: Iglesia de San Juan Apóstol y Evangelista) is a Roman Catholic Asturian pre-Romanesque church situated in Santianes de Pravia, northern Spain.

== Cultural references ==
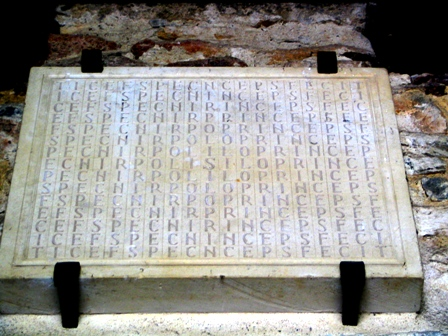
Foundation stone in the form of a letter labyrinth: Silo princeps fecit

Painting of Salvador Dalí inspired by the foundation stone

The church contains a foundation stone in the form of a letter labyrinth ("Silo Princeps Fecit") that records the 8th-century founding of the church by King Silo of Asturias. The inscription Silo princeps fecit singularly combined in fifteen horizontal lines and nineteen perpendicular columns of letters. The T forms the beginning and the end of the first and last line in consequence of which the name Silo is not to be found till the eighth line and the S which begins it is exactly in the centre of that line and of the tenth column thus the name is in the shape of a cross as the letters above below and on each side of the S form the word Silo.

This letter labyrinth appears to inspire the hypercube of Salvador Dalí's painting A Propos of the "Treatise on Cubic Form" by Juan de Herrera, housed in the Museo Reina Sofia, Madrid.

== See also ==
- Asturian architecture
- Catholic Church in Spain
