= Santianes, Pravia =

Parish in Asturias, Spain

Coordinates: 43.505278°N 6.092778°W

Santianes is one of fifteen parishes (administrative divisions) in Pravia, a municipality within the province and autonomous community of Asturias, in northern Spain.

The population is 631 (INE 2011).

== Villages and hamlets ==
Church panorama in Santianes

- Bances
- Los Cabos
- Santianes
