= Alfonso I of Asturias =

King of Asturias from 739 to 757

Alfonso I
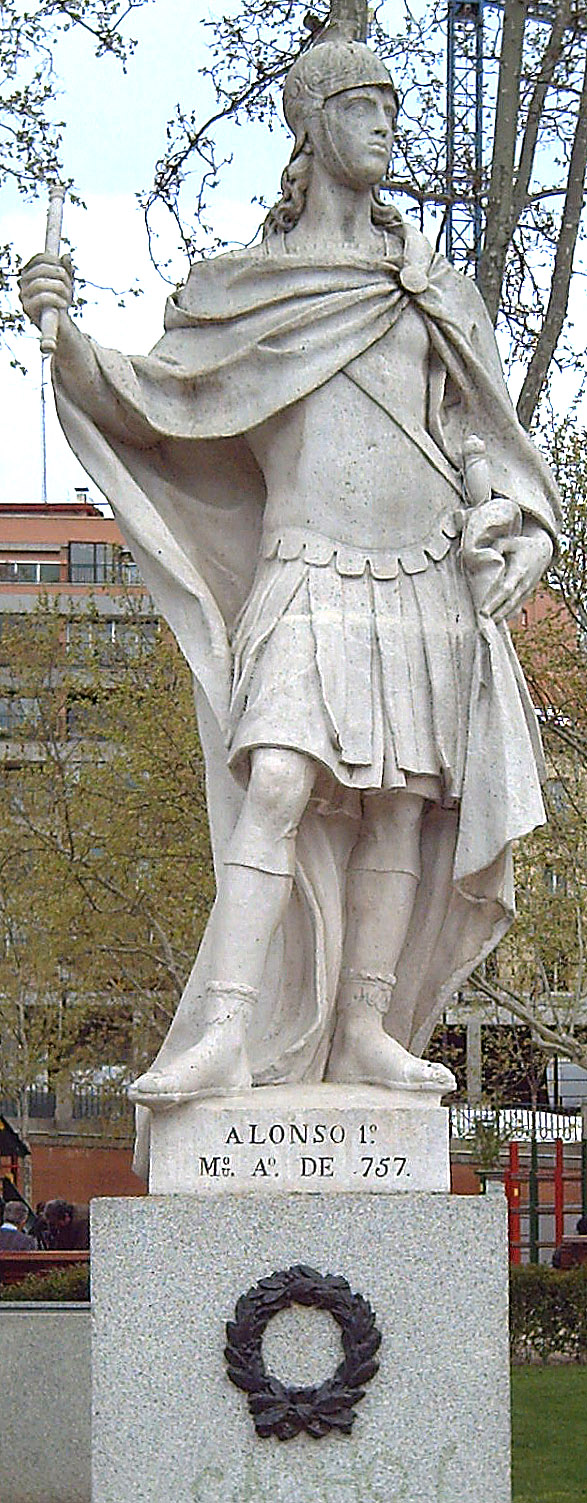
- An 18th-century statue of Alfonso I, by Juan Porcel in Madrid

King of Asturias
- Reign: 739–757
- Coronation: 739
- Predecessor: Favila
- Successor: Fruela I
- Born: 693; Cantabria
- Died: 757; Cangas de Onís, Asturias
- Burial: Santa Cueva de Covadonga
- Consort: Ermesinda
- Issue: Fruela I of Asturias; Vimarano; Adosinda; Mauregatus of Asturias
- Dynasty: Astur-Leonese dynasty
- Father: Peter of Cantabria
- Religion: Chalcedonian Christianity

Alfonso I of Asturias, called the Catholic (el Católico), (c. 693 – 757) was the third king of Asturias, reigning from 739 to his death in 757. His reign saw a great extension of the Christian domain of Asturias, reconquering Galicia and León.

He succeeded his brother-in-law Favila, and was succeeded by his son, Fruela I. Alfonso's illegitimate son, Mauregatus, also became king, and his daughter Adosinda was consort to King Silo of Asturias. The dynasty started by Alfonso was known in contemporary Al-Andalus as the Astur-Leonese dynasty.

== Biography ==
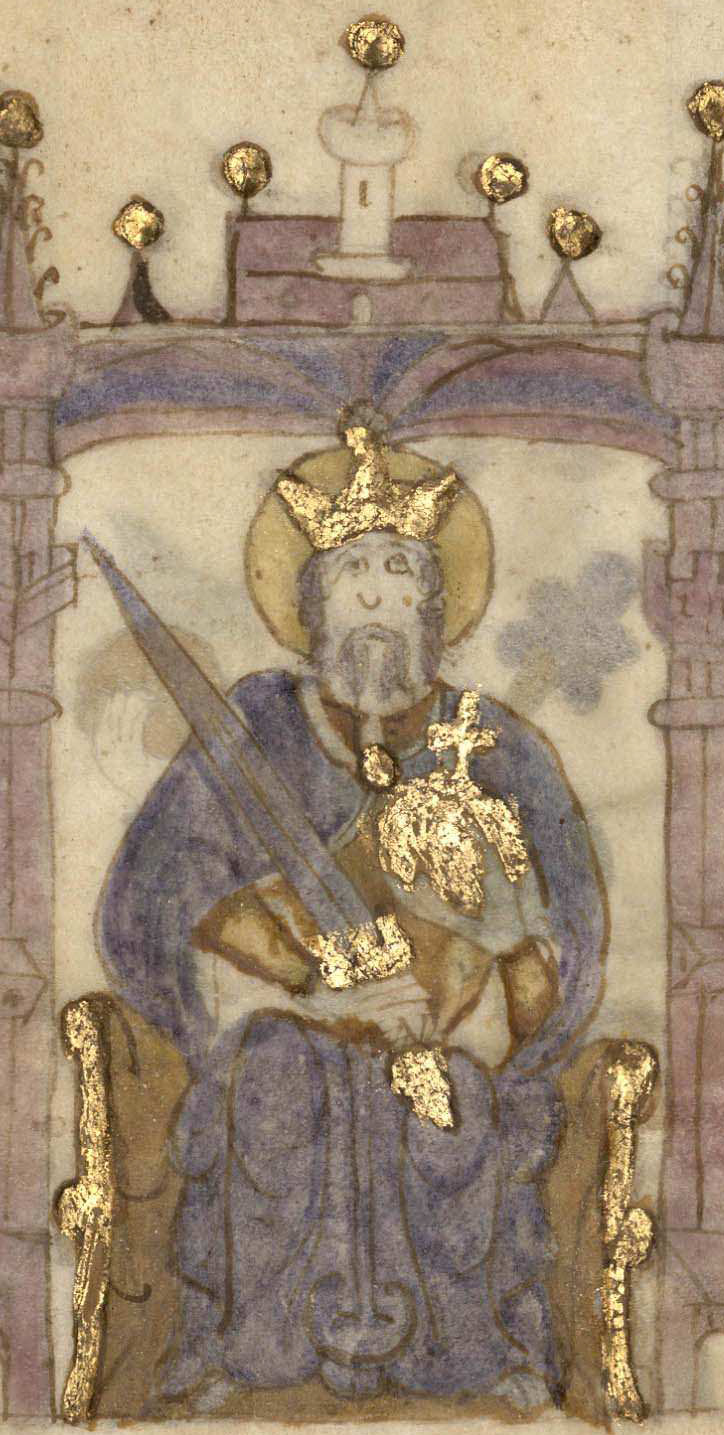
Depiction of Alfonso in the Castilian manuscript Compendium of Chronicles of Kings, c. 1312–1325

As the son of Duke Peter of Cantabria, Alfonso held many lands in that region. He is said to have married Ermesinda, daughter of Pelagius. His father-in-law founded Asturias after the Battle of Covadonga in which he reversed the Moorish conquest of the region. He succeeded Pelagius' son, his brother-in-law, Favila, on the throne after the latter's premature death.

Whether Pelagius or Favila were ever considered kings in their own lifetime is debatable, but Alfonso certainly was. He began a lifelong war against the Moors. In 740, he took advantage of the Berber Revolt and led the reconquest of Galicia. The cities of Lugo and Tuy in Galicia, who had remained unoccupied by Muslim forces joined his domain and, in 754, he conquered the City of León. He went as far as La Rioja. However, the few urban populations of these frontier regions fled to his northern dominions, leaving a depopulated buffer between the Christian and Muslim states.

This created the so-called Desert of the Duero, an empty region between the River Duero and the Asturian Mountains. Alfonso intended it this way; he wished to create an area in which any invading army would find survival difficult. Besides the martial aspects, the demographic and cultural effects of this policy on later Asturian, Spanish and Portuguese history is large. It was over a hundred years before the region was repopulated (an event known as the Repoblación).

The Arab writers speak of the kings of the northwest of Iberia as the Beni Alfons (descendants or House of Alfonso), and appear to recognize them as a Galician royal stock derived from Alfonso I. Alfonso is credited with establishing the shrine of Our Lady of Covadonga, in commemoration of his father in law's victory at the Battle of Covadonga. He and his queen are interred there. Their epitaph reads:

"AQVI YAZE EL CATOLICO Y SANTO REI DON ALONSO EL PRIMERO I SV MVJER DOÑA ERMENISINDA ERMANA DE DON FAVILA A QVIEN SVCEDIO. GANO ESTE REY MVCHAS VITORIAS À LOS MOROS. FALLECIO EN CANGAS AÑO DE 757."

"Here lies the Catholic and Holy King Don Alfonso the First and his wife Doña Ermesinda, sister of Don Favila whom he succeeded. This king won many victories against the Moors. He died in Cangas in the year 757."

== Family ==
Alfonso had four children. Three were through his marriage to Ermesinda, and one, Mauregatus, was born to a Muslim slave, Sisalda.

- Fruela I of Asturias (722-768), succeeded Alfonso as king (757-768).
- Vimarano, assassinated in 765 by Fruela.
- Adosinda, queen consort of King Silo of Asturias (reigned 774-783)
- Mauregatus of Asturias, succeeded Silo as king (reigned 783-789).

== See also ==
- Asturias in the Reconquista

== Sources ==
- Collins, Roger (1995). "Spain: the northern kingdoms and the Basques, 711-910". In McKitterick, Rosamond (ed.). The New Cambridge Medieval History. Vol. II: c. 700-c.900. Cambridge University Press. pp. 272–289. ISBN 978-1107460416.
- Collins, Roger (2014). Caliphs and Kings Spain, 796-1031. Wiley. ISBN 9781118730010.

Preceded by Favila	King of Asturias; 739–757	Succeeded by Fruela I
