= Ambrosio de Morales =

16th-century Spanish historian

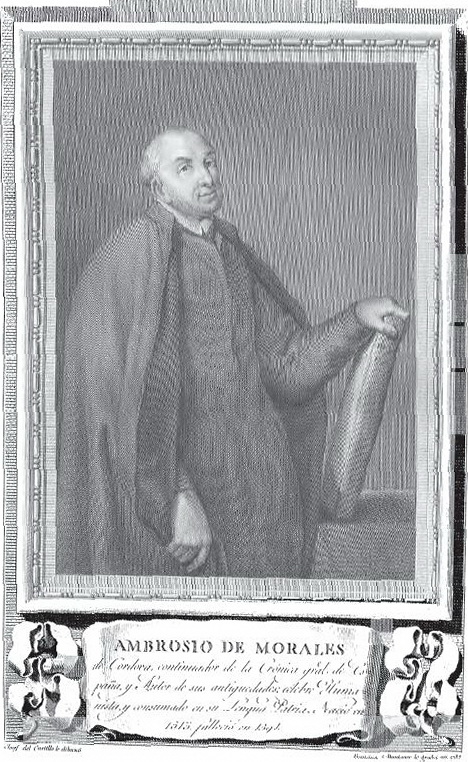
Ambrosio de Morales

Ambrosio de Morales (Cordoba, Spain, 1513 – ib., 21 September 1591) was a Spanish historian. After his studies at the University of Salamanca and Alcalá, he took Holy orders. Soon he was elected to the chair of Belles-Lettres at Alcalá. In 1574 he was appointed chronicler of Castile and commissioned to continue Florián de Ocampo's Crónica General de España. This he brought down, after ten years of labour on it, to the date of the union of Castile and León under Ferdinand I. His pupil Sandoval continued it down to 1079.

== Published works ==
- Crónica general de España, prosiguiendo adelante los cinco libros que el Maestro Florian Docampo, Coronista del Emperador D. Carlos V dexó escritos (Alcalá, 1574, 3 vols., and see also the ed. of Madrid, 1791-2).
- De las antigüedades de las ciudades de España; and the Viaje por orden del Rey D. Felipe II etc.
