= Pelagius of Asturias =

King of Asturias (c. 685–737)

Pelagius
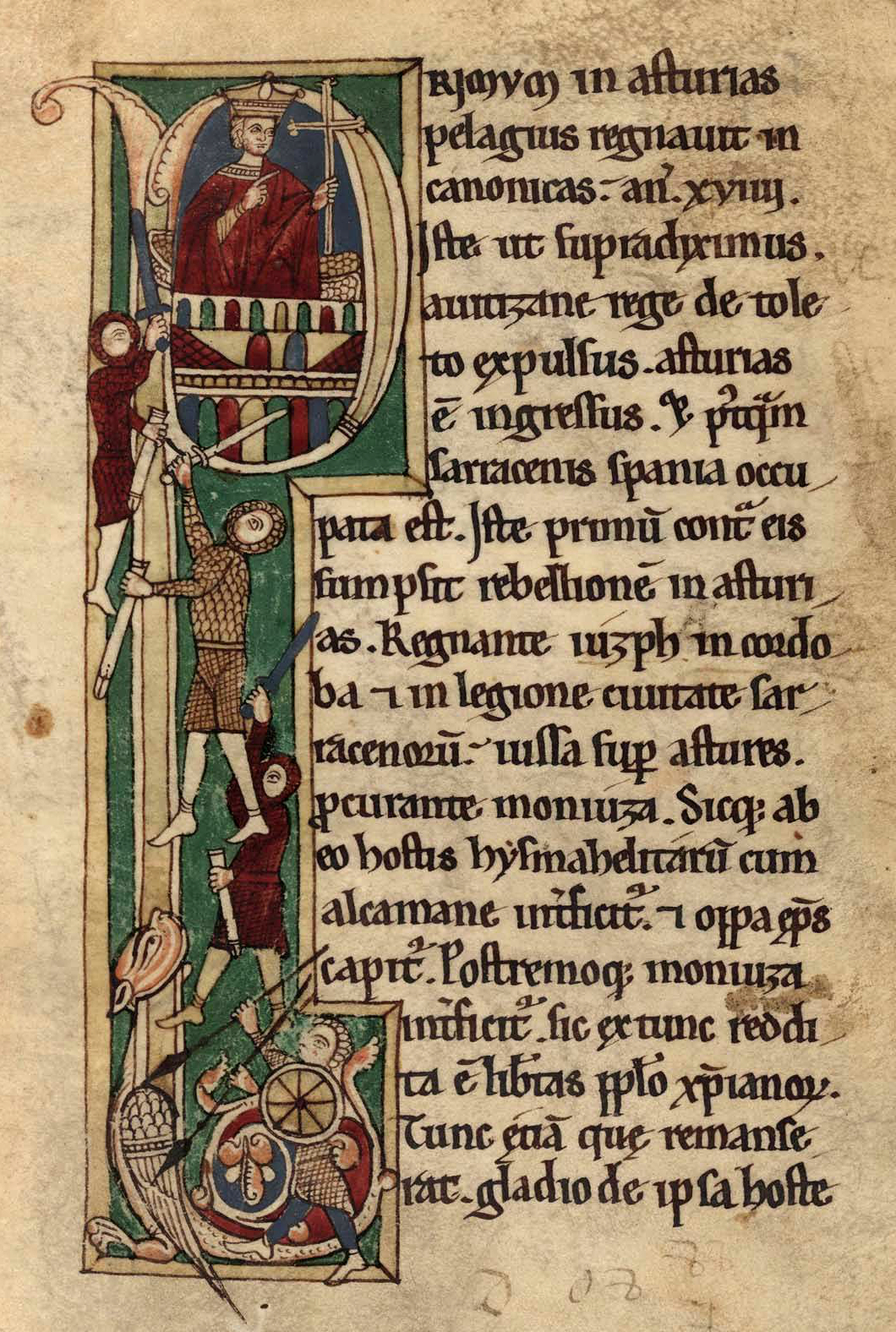
- A depiction of the Battle of Covadonga in a decorated initial from a 12th-century illustrated manuscript of the Liber testamentorum. Pelagius, crowned and holding a cross, is leading at the top.

King of Asturias
- Reign: 718–737
- Successor: Favila of Asturias
- Born: c. 685
- Died: 737
- Burial: Santa Cueva de Covadonga
- Consort: Gaudiosa
- Issue: Favila of Asturias; Ermesinda of Asturias
- Dynasty: Astur-Leonese dynasty
- Father: Favila of Cantabria
- Religion: Chalcedonian Christianity

Pelagius (Spanish: Pelayo; c. 685 – 737) was a Visigothic nobleman who founded the Kingdom of Asturias in 718. Pelagius is credited with initiating the Reconquista, the Christian reconquest of the Iberian Peninsula from the Moors, and establishing the Asturian monarchy.

== Early life ==
Pelagius was born around 685, although the exact details of his early life remain largely unknown. Traditionally, Pelagius was depicted as of Visigothic origin. Recent scholarship increasingly supports the idea that Pelagius was a nobleman of Hispano-Roman descent, linked to the local Asturian elite. but by the time, legal distinctions between Roman and Germanic people had already been dropped starting with the Visigothic Code. Historical texts emphasize Pelagius's connection to the Asturian society. He is believed to be the son of Favila. The Chronica Albeldense, elaborated three centuries after his death, says that Favila was a dux of Gallaecia, who was killed by the Visigothic king Wittiza. The Chronicle of Alfonso III identifies Pelagius as a grandson of Chindasuinth and says that his father was blinded in Córdoba, at the instigation of Wittiza. Wittiza is also said to have exiled Pelagius from Toledo upon assuming the crown in 702. In the opinion of Roger Collins, this is a late tradition and the account of the Albeldense, which locates Pelagius's origins in the north of the peninsula, is more credible. Both chronicles agree, however, that he was a Visigoth who was exiled from Toledo by Wittiza.

According to the later tradition, Munuza, the Berber governor of Iegione (either Gijón or León), became attracted to Pelagius's sister and sent word to Tariq ibn Ziyad, who ordered him to capture Pelagius and send him to Córdoba. If Munuza's seat is identified with Gijón, it may be inferred that the Arabs had established their rule in the Asturias and that Pelagius was not the leader of a local resistance to Arab conquest. Pelagius may have come to terms with the Arab elite whereby he was permitted to govern locally in the manner of the previous Visigoths, as is known to have occurred between Arab rulers and Visigothic noblemen elsewhere, as in the case of Theudimer, although most historians consider this unlikely.

== Reign ==
At some point, Pelagius is said to have rebelled, but for what reasons is unknown; such rebellions by local authorities against their superiors formed a common theme in Visigothic Spain. A Muslim army was sent against him under the command of Alkama and the Christian bishop of Seville, Oppa. That Alkama was the general and that there was a bishop of Seville named Oppa among his ranks is generally accepted. A battle was fought near Covadonga (in monte Auseva or in monte Libana) in which Alkama was killed and Oppa captured. Moorish chronicles of the event describe Pelagius and his small force as "thirty wild donkeys", as reported by al-Maqqari in the 17th century. The battle is usually dated to 718 or 719, between the governorships of al-Hurr and al-Samh, though some have dated it as late as 722 and the Chronica Albeldensia dates it in the 740s.

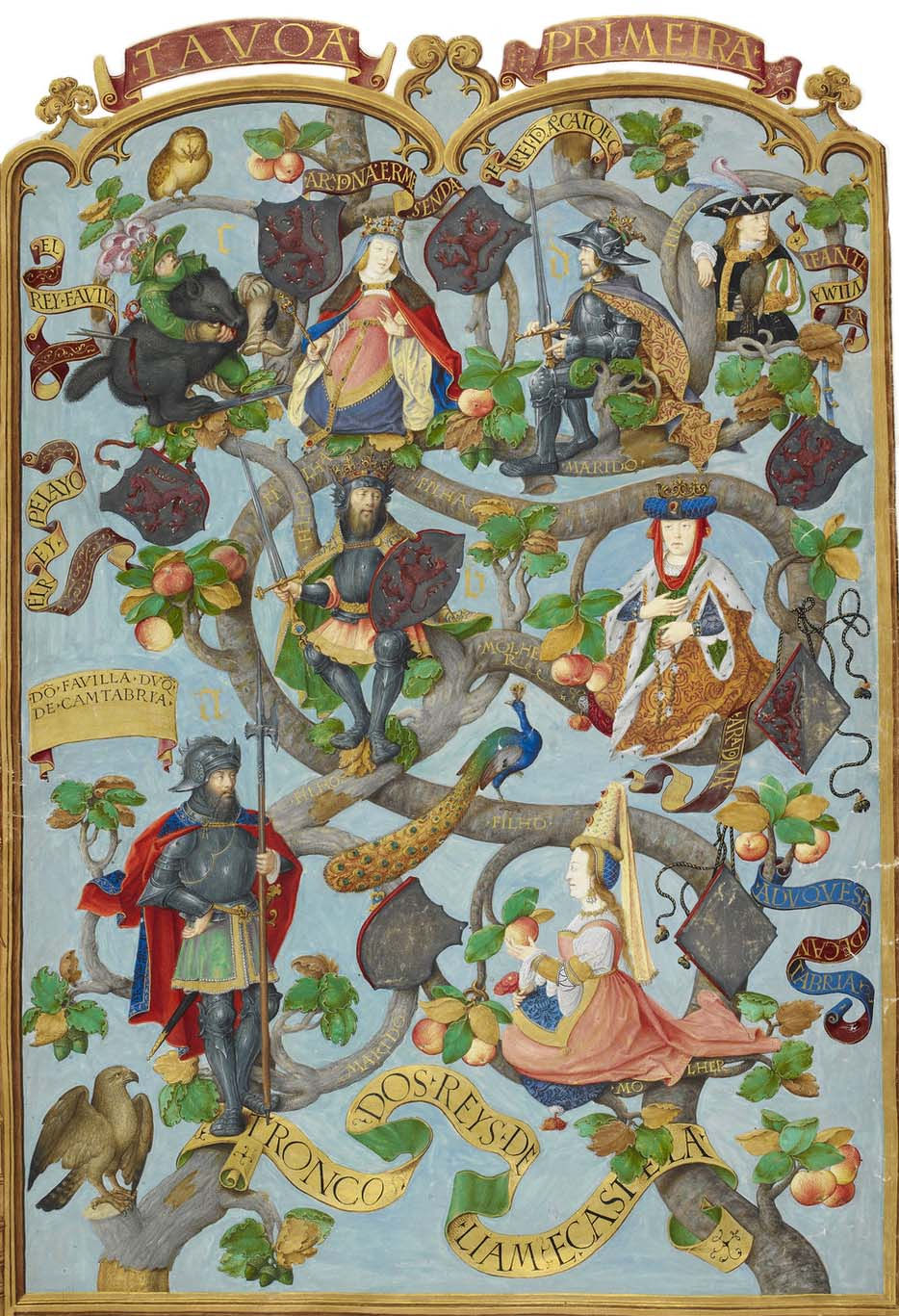
Ducado de Cantabria in 739 : Pelagius son of Favila Duque de Cantabria. "Genealogia dos Reis de Portugal" 1530

After his election as princeps (prince, principal leader) of the Asturians by the local magnates in the Visigothic manner, Pelagius made his capital at Cangas de Onís. The Chronica Rotensis says about this election:

And he [Pelagius], going to his mountainous lands, gathered all those who were going to council and ascended a big mountain named Asseuua. He spread his orders between all the Astures, who gathered in council and elected Pelagius as their princeps.

His kingdom, firstly centred on the eastern Asturias, soon grew. He married his daughter Ermesinda to the future king Alfonso I, son of Pelagius's eastern neighbour, Duke Peter of Cantabria.

Pelagius reigned for eighteen or nineteen years until his death in 737, when he was succeeded by his son Fafila.

Pelagius was buried in the church of Santa Eulalia de Abamia, located in the surroundings of the village of Corao, near Cangas de Onís. His remains were transferred by King Alfonso X of Castile to the Holy Cave of Covadonga, as were those of his wife Gaudiosa and his sister. He left, in addition to his son and successor Fafila, a daughter, Ermesinda, who was to become progenitress, along with King Alfonso I of Asturias ("Alfonso the Catholic"), of the later royalty of Asturias.

== Historiography ==
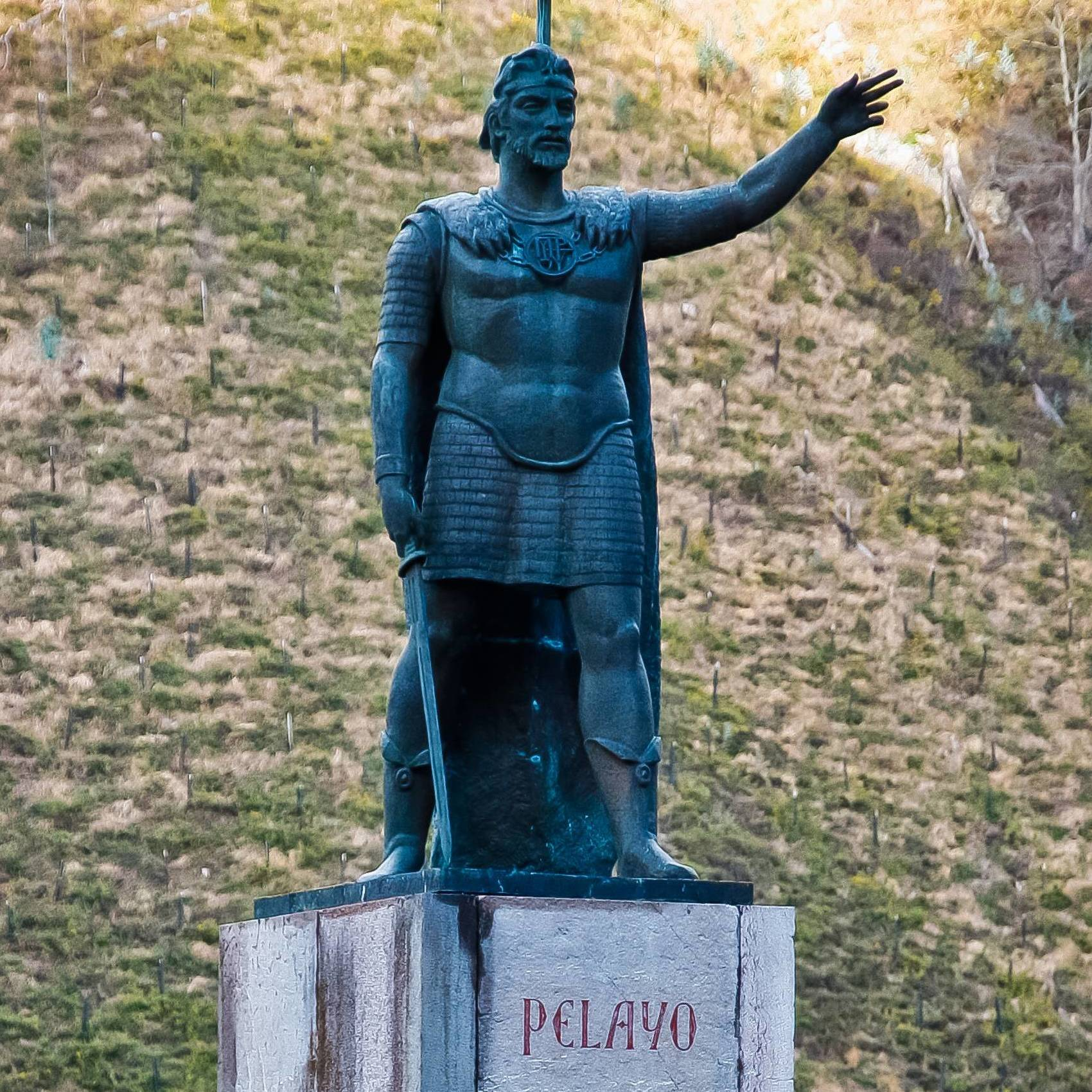
The Monument to Pelagius of Asturias, located in Covadonga, was crafted by Spanish artist Gerardo Zaragoza and inaugurated in 1964.

The chief sources for Pelagius's life and career are two Latin chronicles written in the late ninth century in the kingdom he founded. The first is the Chronica Albeldensia, written at Albelda towards 881, and preserved in the Codex Vigilanus, with a continuation to 976. The latter is the Chronicle of Alfonso III, which was revised in the early tenth century and preserved in two textual traditions that diverge in several key passages: the Chronica Rotensis, preserved in the Códice de Roda, and the Chronica ad Sebastianum, supposedly written by Sebastian, Bishop of Salamanca (910–913). The only likely earlier written sources from which these chroniclers could derive information are regnal lists.

== See also ==
- Asturias in the Reconquista

== Notes ==
| New title | King of Asturias; 718–737 | Succeeded by Favila |
