= Favila of Asturias =

Favila
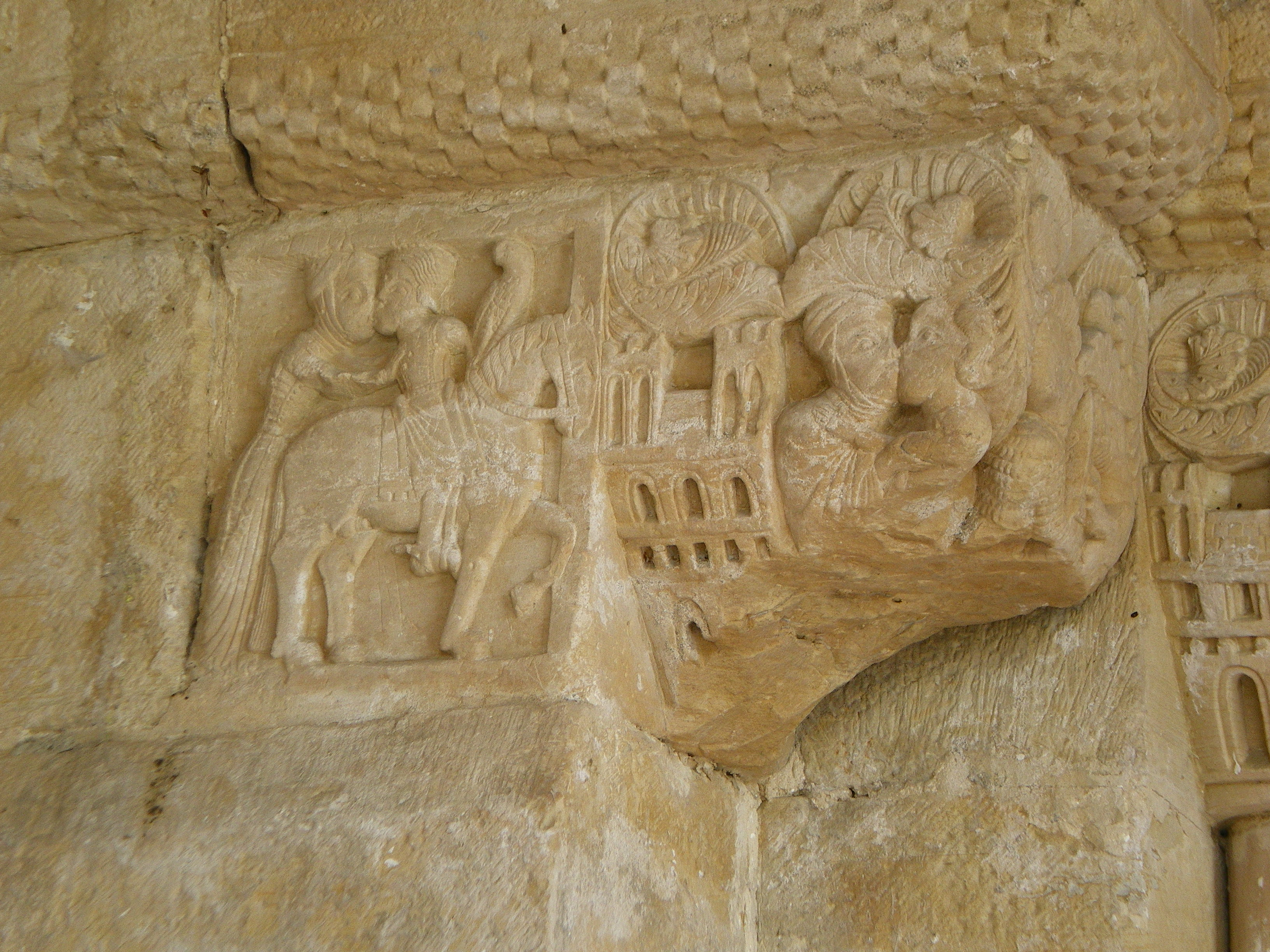
- Carvings depicting Favila's last day, from the twelfth-century portal of the monastery of San Pedro de Villanueva

King of Asturias
- Reign: 737–739
- Coronation: 737
- Predecessor: Pelagius
- Successor: Alfonso I
- Born: c. 710
- Died: 739; Cangas de Onís, Asturias
- Burial: Santa Cruz de Cangas de Onís
- Consort: Froiluba
- Dynasty: Astur-Leonese dynasty
- Father: Pelagius
- Mother: Gaudiosa
- Religion: Chalcedonian Christianity

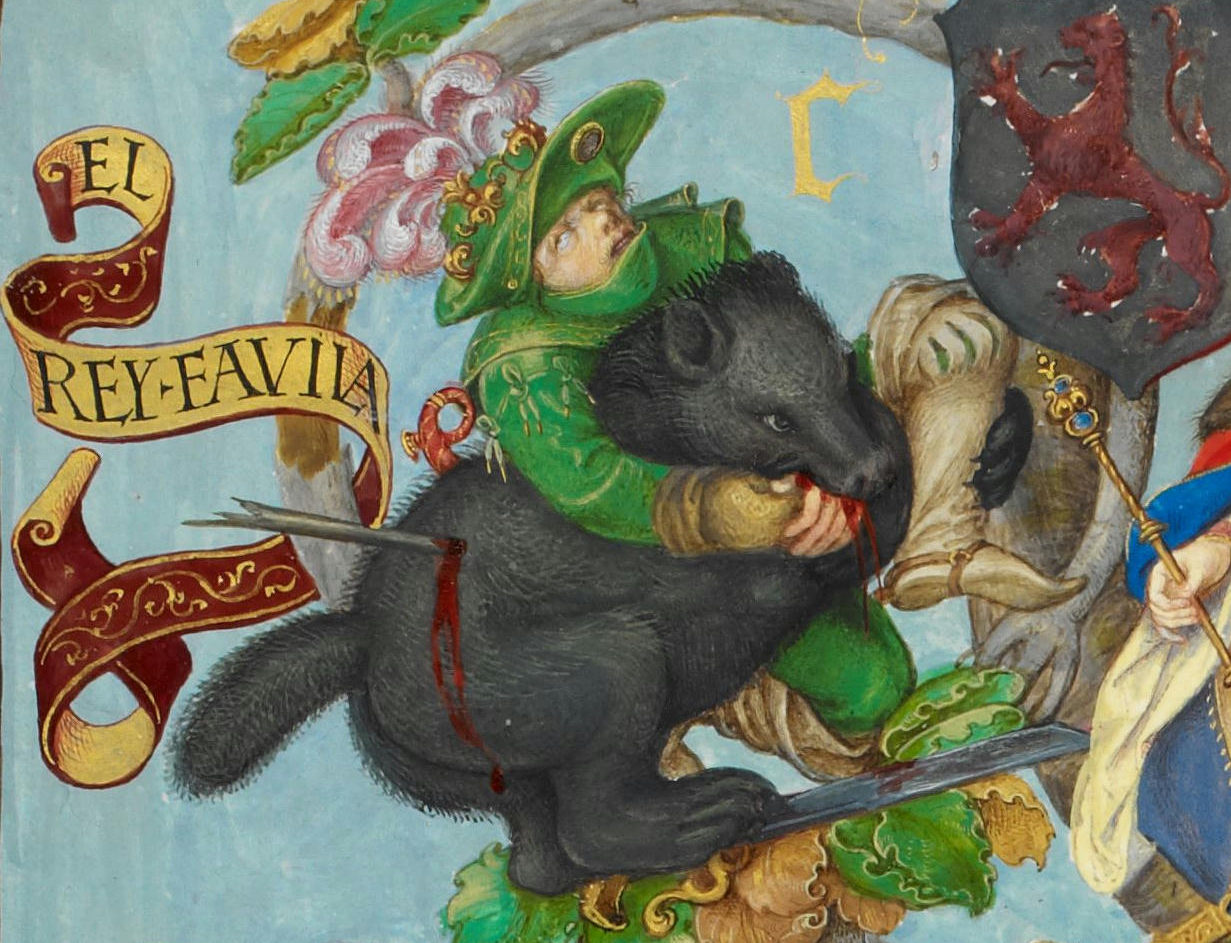
A 1530s miniature, depicting Favila being mauled by a bear

Favila or Fafila (died 739) was the second King of Asturias from 737 until his death. He was the only son and successor of Pelagius, the first Asturian monarch.

In 737 he founded the Church of Santa Cruz, in his capital of Cangas de Onís, but aside from this, nothing else about his reign is known.

Favila was killed by a bear while on a hunt in 739. As a result, Asturian chroniclers were critical of him for his excessive levity. However, royal hunts were not just for entertainment, they helped foster political unity within the court.

Favila was buried with his wife Froiluba in the Church of Santa Cruz de Cangas de Onís.

He was succeeded by his brother-in-law Alfonso, husband of his sister Ermesinda.

== Notes ==
Preceded by Pelagius	King of Asturias; 737–739	Succeeded by Alfonso I
