= Silo of Asturias =

Silo
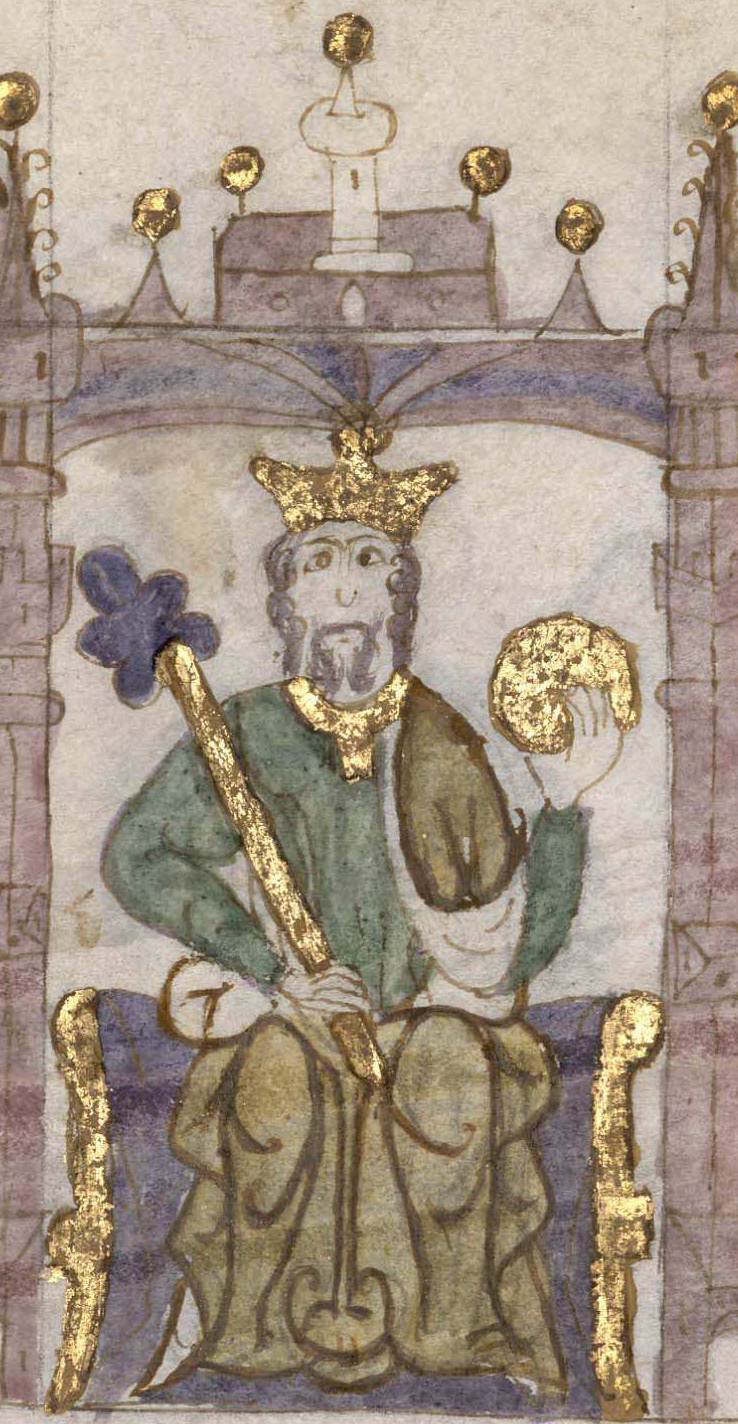
- Depiction in the Castilian manuscript Compendium of Chronicles of Kings, c. 1312–1325

King of Asturias
- Reign: 774–783
- Predecessor: Aurelio
- Successor: Alfonso II
- Died: 783; Pravia, Asturias
- Consort: Adosinda
- Dynasty: Astur-Leonese dynasty
- Religion: Chalcedonian Christianity

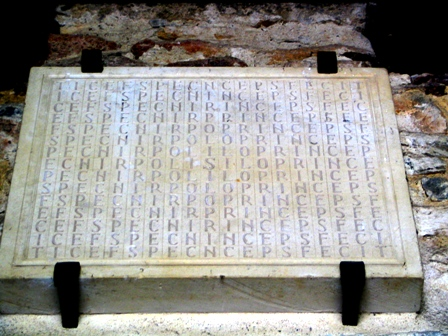
Stone commemorating Silo's foundation of the church of Santianes de Pravia. Beginning with the central "S" and moving in any direction spells Silo princeps fecit (Prince Silo made [it]).

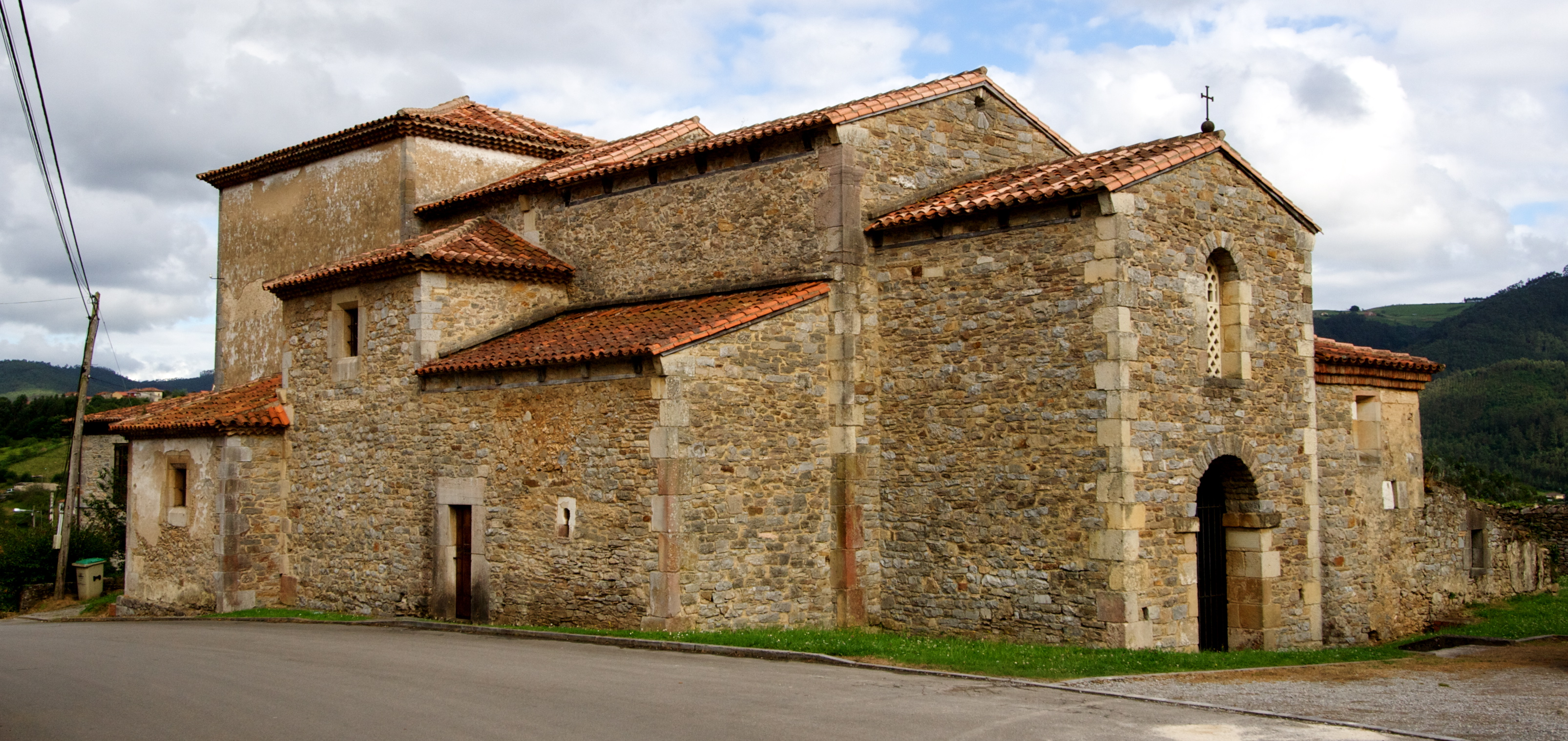
The Church of San Juan Apóstol y Evangelista, Santianes de Pravia, founded by Silo.

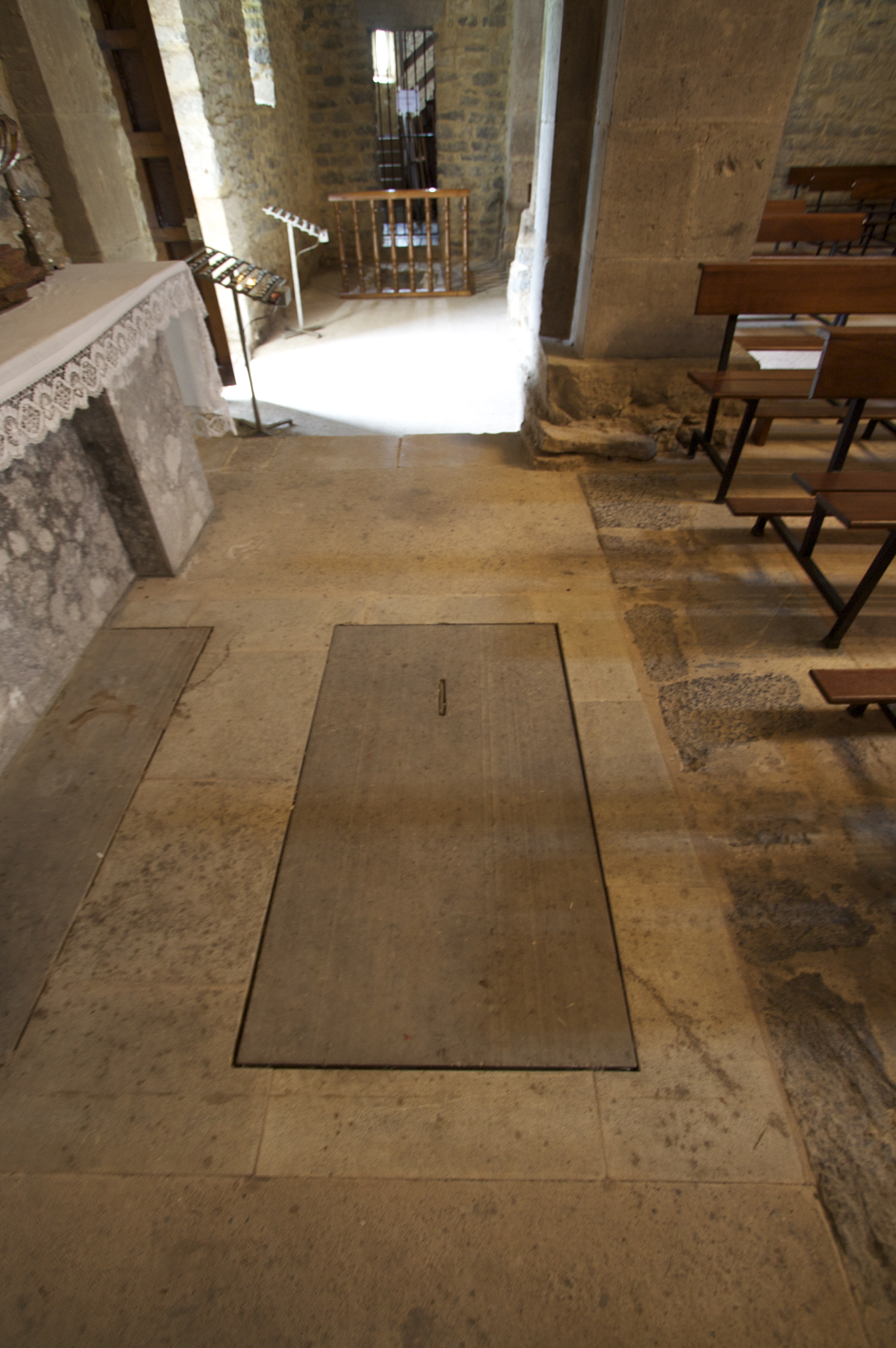
Presumed tombs of Adosinda and Silo in the church of Santianes de Pravia.

Silo (died 783) was the king of Asturias from 774 to 783, succeeding Aurelius. He came to the throne upon his marriage to Adosinda, daughter of Alfonso I ("Alfonso the Catholic"). He moved the capital of the Kingdom of Asturias from Cangas de Onís to Pravia, closer to the center of the kingdom. He was a contemporary of Abd al-Rahman I, Umayyad Emir of Córdoba, and of Charlemagne.

== Life ==
=== Accession to the throne ===
In Silo's time, monarchs were apparently elected by the nobility as in the earlier Visigothic Kingdom. Monarchs were chosen from among a small number of dynasties. Preference tended to go to the son of a king or, where that was not possible, to the husband of a king's daughter, as had happened in the case of Alfonso and of Silo himself, or, failing that, to another male of royal lineage thought capable of governing.

Nevertheless, there is academic controversy about the mode of succession: election after the Visigothic style, matrilineal succession according to indigenous practice, and hereditary in royal lineages. Each of these theories leads to a somewhat different account of Silo's accession to the throne.

=== Reign ===
According to the Chronicon Albeldense, Silo kept peace with the Muslims ob causam matris, "for his mother's sake". The meaning of this phrase has been debated by scholars. It could mean that his mother was a Muslim with some sort of connection to the Umayyad Emir Abd al-Rahman I, or that she was a hostage of Abd al-Rahman in Córdoba, or it could mean yet something else.

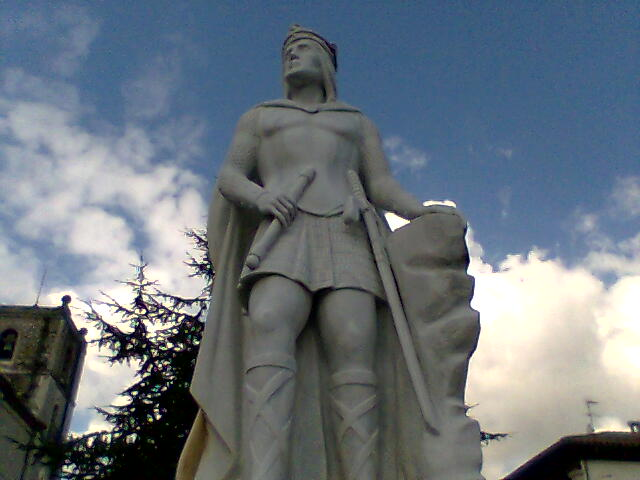
Statue of King Silo in Pravia, Asturias.

One could explain the inactivity of the Muslims with respect to the Kingdom of Asturias by the fact that Silo's reign coincided with the intervention of Charlemagne in Spain in 778. Charlemagne could not maintain the siege of Zaragoza and had to retire by way of Roncesvalles, suffering a great defeat there, and the subsequent campaign of Abd-al-Rahman I in 781 into the Ebro Valley in revenge against those who had been favorably disposed toward the French invasion.

Conversely, within the Kingdom of Asturias, during Silo's reign Galicia rebelled for the second time, having done so before during the reign of Fruela I. The chronicles do not elucidate the motives for the rebellion. The rebel army faced Silo's troops in the Battle of Montecubeiro in what is now the Province of Lugo, where he defeated them, ending the rebellion.

The oldest known medieval written document in the Iberian Peninsula dates from Silo's reign. The Diploma del Rei Don Sílo (Diploma of King Silo) dates from 23 August 775. In this contractual document of donation "pro anima" ("for the sake of the soul"), Silo granted particular properties in the village of Tabulata (now Trabada) in Lucis (Lugo) to a group of monks, with the intention that they would found a monastery.

=== Moving the court to Pravia ===
Upon ascending to the throne, Silo moved the capital from Cangas de Onís to Pravia, the region in which he was a local magnate, a landed aristocrat. The new capital had the strategic advantage that Pravia, an ancient Roman settlement, was located in the valley of the Nalón River along the Roman road to Asturica Augusta, now Astorga. Furthermore, once Silo extended the frontiers of the realm to Galicia, Cangas de Onís was now quite far from the center of his kingdom.

== Death and succession ==
Silo died in Pravia in 783. The Estoria de España or Primera Crónica General says of his death:

Eight years into the reign of King Silo, in year 817 of the Spanish era [783 CE], King Silo died and was interred in the church of Saint John the Apostle and Evangelist, which was built in his lifetime.

After his death, Silo's widow Adosinda engineered the election of her nephew Alfonso, son of Fruela I, as successor. The adolescent was named governor of the Palatium Regis, roughly chancellor. The throne was then seized by Mauregato, son of Alfonso I and of a slave woman of Muslim origin.

== Burial ==
Silo was entombed in the Church of San Juan Apóstol y Evangelista, Santianes de Pravia, which he had ordered built. The tomb believed to be his and Adosinda's remains there to this day. Nonetheless, the Maestro Custodio is said to have stated that Silo's remains were moved to the monastery of San Juan de las Dueñas in the city of Oviedo, and re-interred behind the main altar there.

== Notes ==
Preceded by Aurelius	King of Asturias; 774–783	Succeeded by Alfonso II
