= L'Entregu CF =

Association football club in Spain

Coordinates: 43.287283°N 5.647982°W

L'Entregu
- Full name: L'Entregu Club de Fútbol
- Founded: 1997
- Ground: Nuevo Nalón, El Entrego, Asturias, Spain
- Capacity: 1,200
- President: José Luis Cuevas Bobes
- Head coach: Adrián González
- League: Tercera Federación – Group 2
- 2025–26: Tercera Federación – Group 2, 7th of 18
Home colours	Away colours

L'Entregu Club de Fútbol is a Spanish football club based in El Entrego in the autonomous community of Asturias. Founded in 1997, the club play in Tercera Federación – Group 2.

== History ==
L'Entregu CF was founded in 1997, as an heir to both UD El Entrego and El Entrego CD. After several seasons in Regional Divisions, the club promoted for the first time to Tercera División in 2012.

In the 2019/20 season, the club founded their reserve team. They play in the Tercera RFFPA.

A season later they founded their women's team.

In the 2020/21 season they won their league group (the league was divided into two groups due to COVID) and qualified for the promotion phase. After finishing third in the promotion group, they faced CD Llanes in the semifinals of the promotion playoff, losing 1-3 after extra time.

=== Club background ===
- UD El Entrego (1939–1963)
- El Entrego CD (1964–1990)
- L'Entregu CF (1997–present)

UD El Entrego was founded in 1939 from the merger of two local clubs, Arenas de Santana and Sporting del Norte. This club played two promotion phases to the Second Division, in 1956/57 and 1957/58. They were eliminated by A.D. Plus Ultra and CD Baracaldo Altos Hornos respectively. A few years later, in 1963, the club had financial problems and was dissolved.

El Entrego CD was founded in 1964 and unlike its predecessor, this club was not that successful. In their few years of history, they failed to promote to a division higher than the Third Division, with several relegations to the Regional Leagues. In 1990 the team is dissolved again.

== Stadium ==
L'Entregu played at the Nalón Stadium for most of its history. In 1997 the stadium was demolished for the construction of the AS-17 highway. Since that year they have played at the Nuevo Nalón Stadium, with a capacity for 1,200 spectators.

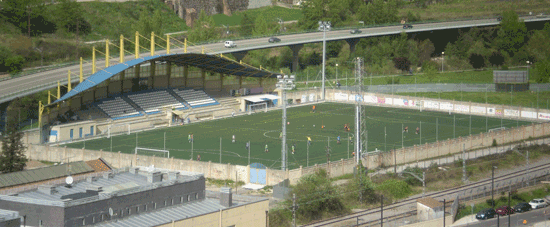
Aerial view of Estadio Nuevo Nalón.

== Rivalries ==
Their biggest rivals are EI San Martín from Sotrondio. The towns are approximately 3 km apart and share the municipality of San Martín del Rey Aurelio. Both clubs have undergone refoundations throughout their history. The current clubs have met 12 times, with the sotrondinos being the ones with the most victories. On the other hand, the entreguinos have always been above their rivals in the table when they have been in the same division.

== Season to season ==
Season	Tier	Division	Place	Copa del Rey
1997–98	7	2ª Reg.	9th	
1998–99	7	2ª Reg.	4th	
1999–2000	7	2ª Reg.	1st	
2000–01	6	1ª Reg.	7th	
2001–02	6	1ª Reg.	11th	
2002–03	6	1ª Reg.	11th	
2003–04	6	1ª Reg.	5th	
2004–05	6	1ª Reg.	5th	
2005–06	6	1ª Reg.	5th	
2006–07	6	1ª Reg.	1st	
2007–08	5	Reg. Pref.	15th	
2008–09	5	Reg. Pref.	10th	
2009–10	5	Reg. Pref.	16th	
2010–11	5	Reg. Pref.	13th	
2011–12	5	Reg. Pref.	3rd	
2012–13	4	3ª	7th	
2013–14	4	3ª	9th	
2014–15	4	3ª	17th	
2015–16	5	Reg. Pref.	1st	
2016–17	4	3ª	15th	

Season	Tier	Division	Place	Copa del Rey
2017–18	4	3ª	9th	
2018–19	4	3ª	8th	
2019–20	4	3ª	9th	
2020–21	4	3ª	1st / 3rd	
2021–22	5	3ª RFEF	7th	
2022–23	5	3ª Fed.	3rd	
2023–24	5	3ª Fed.	5th	
2024–25	5	3ª Fed.	7th	
2025–26	5	3ª Fed.	7th	
2026–27	5	3ª Fed.		

- 8 seasons in Tercera División
- 6 seasons in Tercera Federación/Tercera División RFEF

== Honours ==
- Regional Preferente: 2015/16
- Primera Regional: 2006/07
- Segunda Regional: 1999/00
