= Pablo Xuan Manzano Rodríguez =

- Born: July 22, 1948 (age 78); L'Entregu, Spain
- Education: University of Oviedo
- Occupations: Linguist; teacher; writer
- Organization(s): Academy of the Asturian Language, Conceyu Bable
- Known for: Teaching of Asturian language

Pablo Xuan Manzano Rodríguez (L'Entregu, Spain, 22 July 1948) a scholar of Asturian language. He carried out his basic education in his home village and later on he studied teaching in the University School of Oviedo. He started to work at the age of 20 in the school of L'Entregu, and afterwards he also worked in Gijón, Amieva and Campo de Caso before he started working in the Juan José Calvo Miguel High School in Sotrondio. He is a member of the Council of Asturian Communities representing the Academy of the Asturian Language, of which he has been a fellow since 1984.

Since 2002 he has been teaching Asturian language and culture in the Americas, where every year the Asturian Literature Day is celebrated.

He has taught the Asturian language course that the Academy of the Asturian Language has organized since the 1980s, and has been the chair of these courses since the beginning. He also teaches the courses the University of Oviedo organises every summer in collaboration with the academy, as well as being the secretary of the training program.

He was also the coordinator for schooling of the Regional Ministry of Education, Culture and Sports of Asturias for three years.

He also chairs the "Llingua y enseñanza" (Language and Teaching) collective, which is made up of primary, secondary and university teachers.

He is the author of many papers published in specialized newspapers and journals, always dealing with the teaching of Asturian language and emigration.

He is a founding member of Conceyu Bable and is a pioneer in the process of normalizing the Asturian language in schools. Currently, he is a member of the Council of Asturian Communities.

== Notable works ==
- 1981. Reciella - First textbook for the teaching of Asturian language, written in collaboration with Félix Ferreiro and published by the Academy of the Asturian Language. It was published four times, one of them in the western variant of Asturian.
- 1984. Diccionariu Básicu de la Llingua Asturiana (Basic Dictionary of the Asturian Language) - In collaboration with Félix Ferreiro and Urbano Rodríguez.
- 1988. Llingua asturiana: Una propuesta curricular pa la educación secundaria obligatoria (Asturian Language: A Curricular Proposal for Secondary Education) - In collaboration with Miguel Ramos Corrada, Ramón d'Andrés and Xosé Ramón González Riaño. Academy of the Asturian Language.
- 1996. Cuélebre I y II - Textbooks for primary education, written with Socorro Iglesias Fombona and María Esther López and named after the Asturian mythological creature of the same name.
- 1997. Guíes didáctiques de la llingua asturiana (Didactic Guides of the Asturian Language) - With Socorro Iglesias Fombona and María Esther López.
