= Iglesia de San Andrés (El Entrego) =

Church building in L'Entregu, Spain

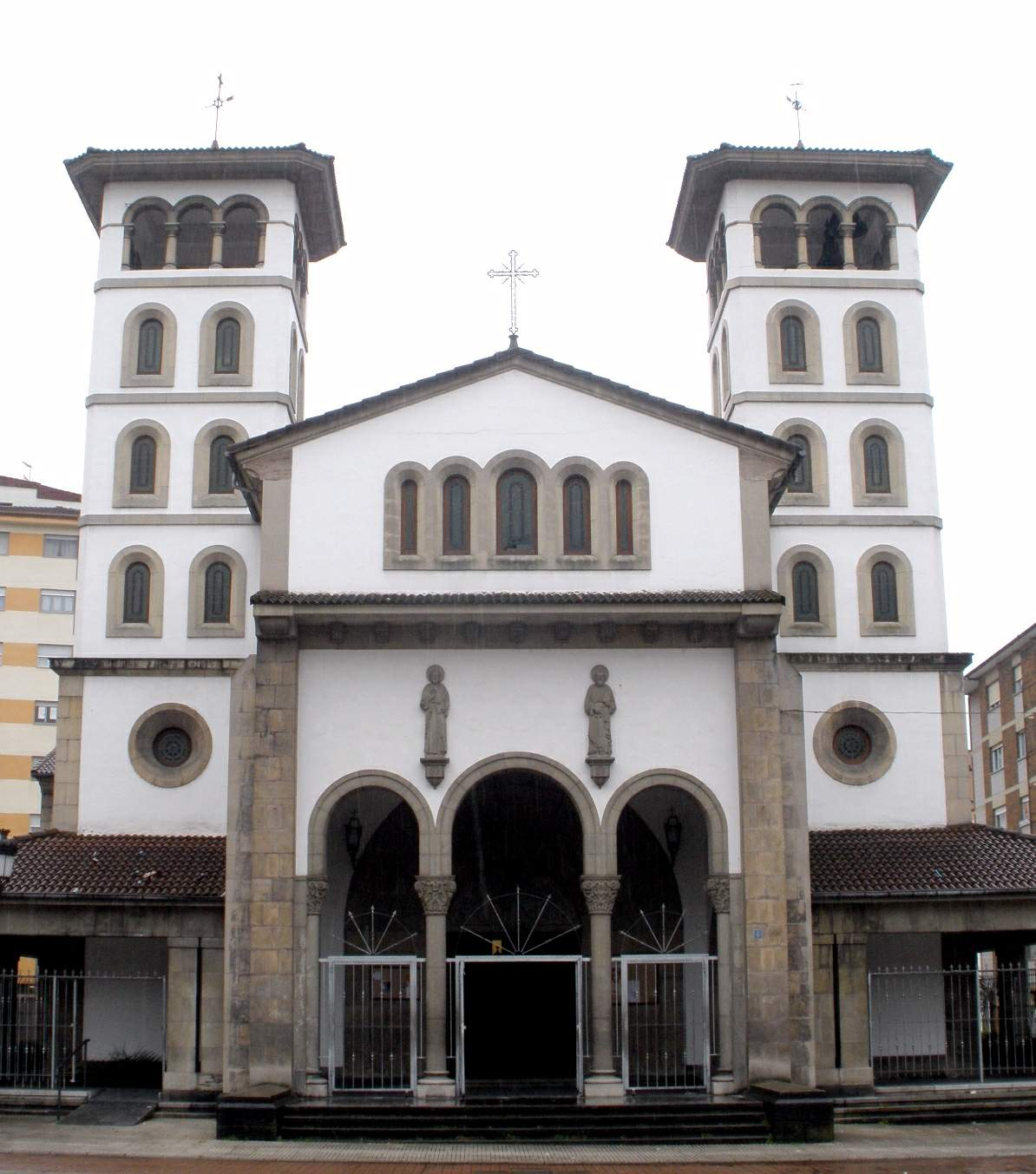
Iglesia de San Andres

Iglesia de San Andrés (Church of St Andrew) is a parish church in San Martín del Rey Aurelio, Asturias, Spain. The Romanesque Revival-style building is situated in the urban area of El Entrego within the Linares parish of the Roman Catholic Archdiocese of Oviedo.

== History ==
The original church of San Andrés de Linares was built along the Nalón River, but was razed in the early 19th century because of flooding. Another church was built across the river, believed to be safe from another possible flood. It was destroyed in 1936 during the Spanish Civil War. Construction of a new church began in 1945 in the El Entrego valley during the autarky period. The architects were Francisco de Zuvillaga and Abelardo Suárez Moro.

== Architecture ==
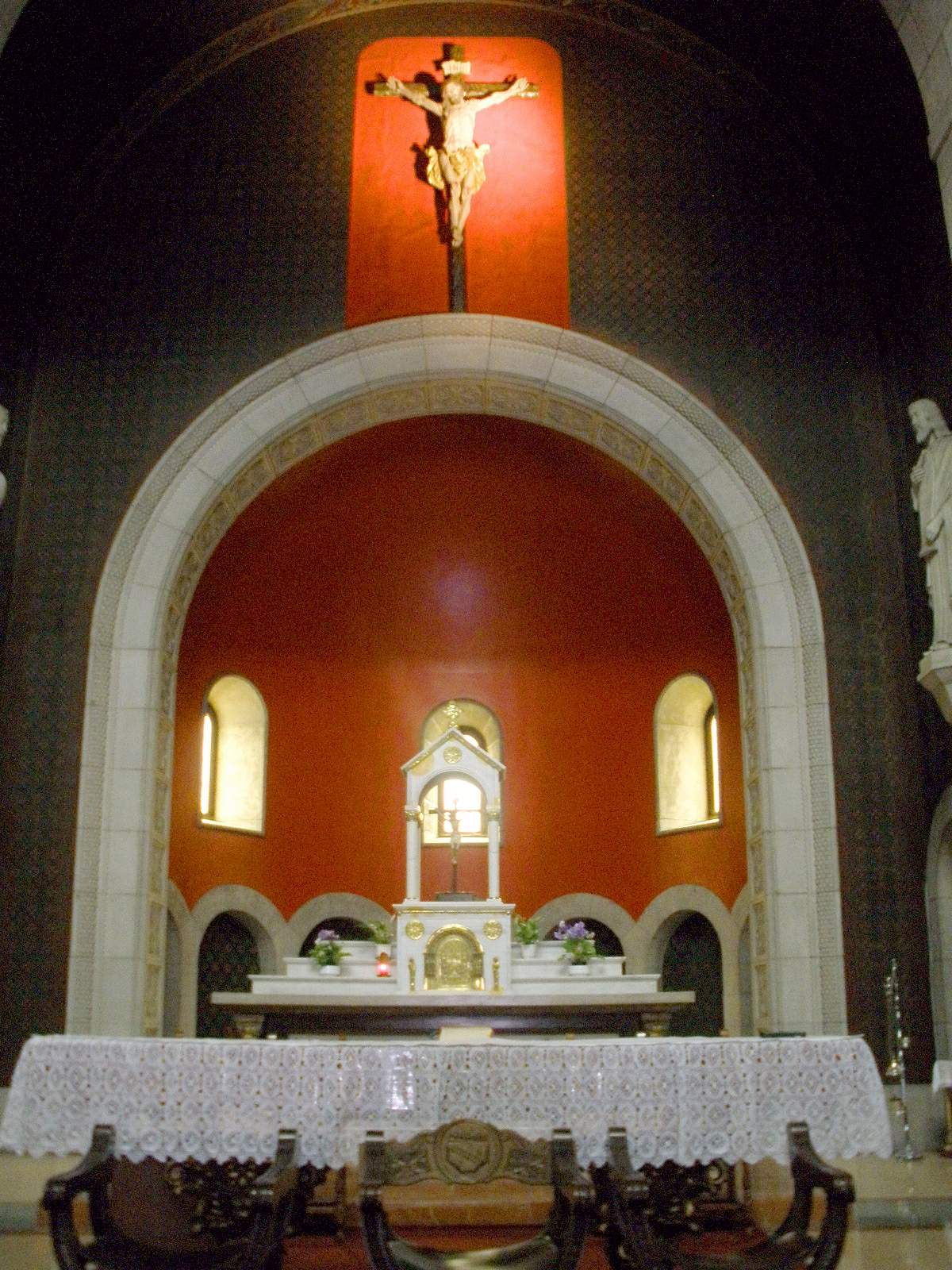
Interior view

The exterior facade includes a combination of Romanesque and Baroque styles, featuring two towers with several bays and a porch. The building was inspired by Santa María del Naranco Cathedral and the sculptures of the Cámara Santa of the Oviedo Cathedral. The plan is in Latin cross style. It has a nave with a barrel vault and two aisles. In the transept stands a dome of Romanesque arches. There is a semicircular apse. Inside are the figures of Christ lying down and St Andrew.

== See also ==
- Asturian art
- Catholic Church in Spain
