= Ángeles Flórez Peón =

Spanish activist and writer (1918–2024)

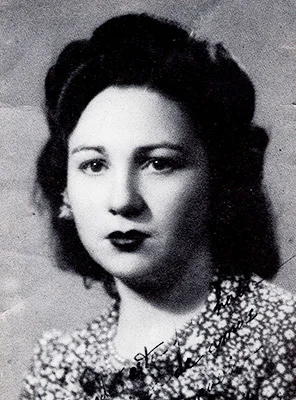
- Born: 17 November 1918; Blimea, Spain
- Died: 23 May 2024 (aged 105); Gijón, Spain
- Other name: Maricuela
- Occupations: Activist; writer
- Organization: Socialist Youth of Asturias
- Political party: Spanish Socialist Workers' Party
- Spouse: Graciano Rozada Vallina (m. 1946; died 2003)

Ángeles Flórez Peón (17 November 1918 – 23 May 2024), known as Maricuela, was a Spanish activist and writer. She was the honorary president of the Socialist Youth of Asturias (JSA), and was considered, at the time of her death, to be the last living Spanish socialist militiawoman.

== Biography ==
Flórez was born in Blimea on 17 November 1918. She began working at age 9, scrubbing floors. When she was 15, she lost her older brother Antonio, who was killed along with 23 other men during the suppression of the October 1934 revolutionary strike in Carbayín. This event led to her joining the Socialist Youth in 1936, and after the July coup d'état, she became a militia member in Colloto. She was also a nurse in a field hospital in Gijón. Her nom de guerre, Maricuela, refers to the main character of a 1934 Jacinto Sánchez play entitled ¡Arriba los pobres del mundo!, in which Flórez had performed at age 17, when the Spanish Civil War broke out.

Flórez was captured in October 1937, and initially sentenced to 15 years' imprisonment, although this was later reduced to 9 years. In May 1938, she was transferred to Saturrarán prison in Gipuzkoa, where she remained until she was released on parole in August 1941. She lived for a time in Barakaldo, where her sister resided, and later left for Oviedo and L'Entregu, where she worked first in a chigre, and later in a pharmacy.

In 1946, Flórez married Graciano Rozada Vallina, who participated in the reorganization of the Spanish Socialist Workers' Party (PSOE) and the Unión General de Trabajadores (UGT) of Asturias. Due to his involvement in these processes, Rozada decided to escape to France in August 1947 at the risk of being arrested. Flórez and their daughter met him in March 1948, after being involved in the death of a group of guerrillas. She remained politically active in exile and participated in the PSOE's 7th Congress in 1958.

She returned to Spain in 1960 to visit her family and was arrested at the border, although she was allowed to continue her visit to Asturias and then return to France. In 2003, her husband died in Saint-Éloy-les-Mines and she returned to Asturias a year later, settling in Gijón, where she joined the JSA in early 2013.

In 2014, aged 95, Flórez began using the social network Facebook to share her ideas and political opinions. In addition, to help preserve the history of that era and its generation, in 2013, she published Memorias de Ángeles Flórez Peón 'Maricuela', in which she compiled testimonies from the Revolution of 1934 and the Civil War. In 2018, she presented a book of her memoirs, Las sorpresas de Maricuela, at the Madrid Book Fair.

Flórez died in Gijón on 23 May 2024, aged 105.

== Recognitions ==
In October 2016, the Club of 25 paid tribute to Flórez, presenting her with an award for "her defense of freedom and democracy," which she received from Diario 16 director Cristina Fallarás. The feminist association presents these awards annually with the objective of "making women and their problems visible". Other recipients included journalist Pepa Bueno and writer Almudena Grandes.

On 21 October 2017, Flórez received the Pozu Fortuna Award, an honor presented annually by the Pozu Fortuna Forum Association in collaboration with the Mieres city council to "those people, organizations, or entities that have distinguished themselves in the achievement of actions or works that enhance the values of humanity, freedom, solidarity, peace, and defense of human rights." The award ceremony took place around the Mieres well, site of one of the largest mass graves in Asturias.

== Books ==
- Memorias de Ángeles Flórez Peón 'Maricuela' (2009), José Barreiro Foundation
- Las sorpresas de Maricuela (2013), Ediciones Trea, Gijón, ISBN 9788497047104
