= Peter of Cantabria =

Spanish noble (died 730)

Peter (Petrus, Spanish: Pedro; died 730) was an eighth-century Duke of Cantabria. While various writers have attempted to name his parentage, (for example, making him son or brother of King Erwig), early sources say nothing more specific than the chronicle of 'Pseudo-Alfonso': that he was "ex semine Leuvigildi et Reccaredi progenitus" (descended from the bloodline of Liuvigild and Reccared I), and even this has been challenged as a possible politically motivated fiction created to support his descendants' later claim to exclusive kingship. He was the father of King Alfonso I and of Fruela of Cantabria, father of kings Aurelius and Bermudo I.

According to the Muslim chroniclers, in the year 714, Musa ibn Nusair sacked Amaya, capital of Cantabria, for the second time after Tariq did the year before. Peter, the provincial dux, led his people into refuge in the mountains, and after the local noble Pelayo of Asturias (Pelagius) started a rebellion against the Berber garrison, which they had managed to establish over the mountain passes in neighbor Asturias, Dux Peter and other western Galician nobles supported the election of Alfonso as new king or Princeps to lead against the common enemy. Other scholars have said, that Pelayo may have been a Cantabrian relative, defending the western access to the Duchy through his own county seat, as that part of the modern province of Asturias was part then of the Cantabrian duchy and the Cantabria of classic Latin record. At any rate, Cantabria and the rest of what would be called Asturias merged as one realm. After the Battle of Covadonga, in which Pelayo avoided defeat by the larger invading force, and managed to dislodge its governor Munuza altogether from Asturias, it seems likely that Peter sent his son to the court of Pelayo at Cangas de Onís. It had been a Visigothic practice to send noble children to the royal court, this was thus a tacit admission of Pelayo's regality. According to the Crónica Albeldense, the territories of the two leaders were united by marriage between Peter's son Alfonso and Pelayo's daughter Ermesinda:

Adefonsus, Pelagi gener, reg. an. XVIIII. Iste Petri Cantabriae ducis filius fuit; et dum Asturias venir Ermesindam Pelagii filiam Pelagio proecipiente, accepit.

Alfonso later succeeded to the Asturian throne and was the first to use the title of king. While Iberian Muslim scholars would call his descendants the Beni Alfons (Arabic: بن إذفنش (Beni Iḍfunš)) after his son, they are more commonly referred to as the Astur-Leonese dynasty.
