= Sotrondio =

Coordinates: 43.2833°N 5.6000°W

Sotrondio Sotrondio (in Asturian)
- Town
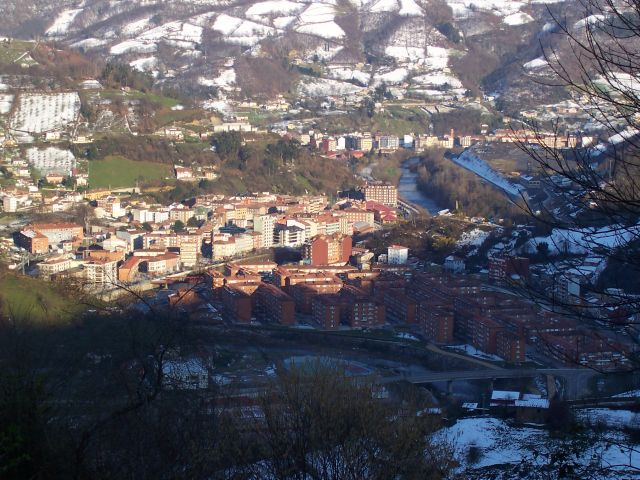
- Aerial view of the town
- Interactive map of Sotrondio
- Country: Spain
- Autonomous community: Asturias
- Province: Asturias
- Municipality: San Martín del Rey Aurelio
- Parish: Linares

Sotrondio is a town in San Martín del Rey Aurelio, Asturias, Spain. In September 2007, by a decree of the Principality of Asturias, it joined the adjacent El Entrego and Blimea to form a single population center, San Martin del Rey, as a homonymous municipality. It is 30 kilometres (19 mi) from Oviedo. The population was 3,849 in 2009, fewer residents than in previous years, declining due to the crisis of industrial restructuring in the Asturian coalfield. It is crossed by the Nalón River separating the Serallo neighborhood from the rest of the town. Aurelius of Asturias is believed to be buried at Iglesia de San Martín de Tours, which is near Sotrondio. It is the local parish church and was rebuilt by Duro Felguera after the Spanish Civil War. Teatro Virginia is located in the Plaza de Ramón y Cajal.

== Gallery ==
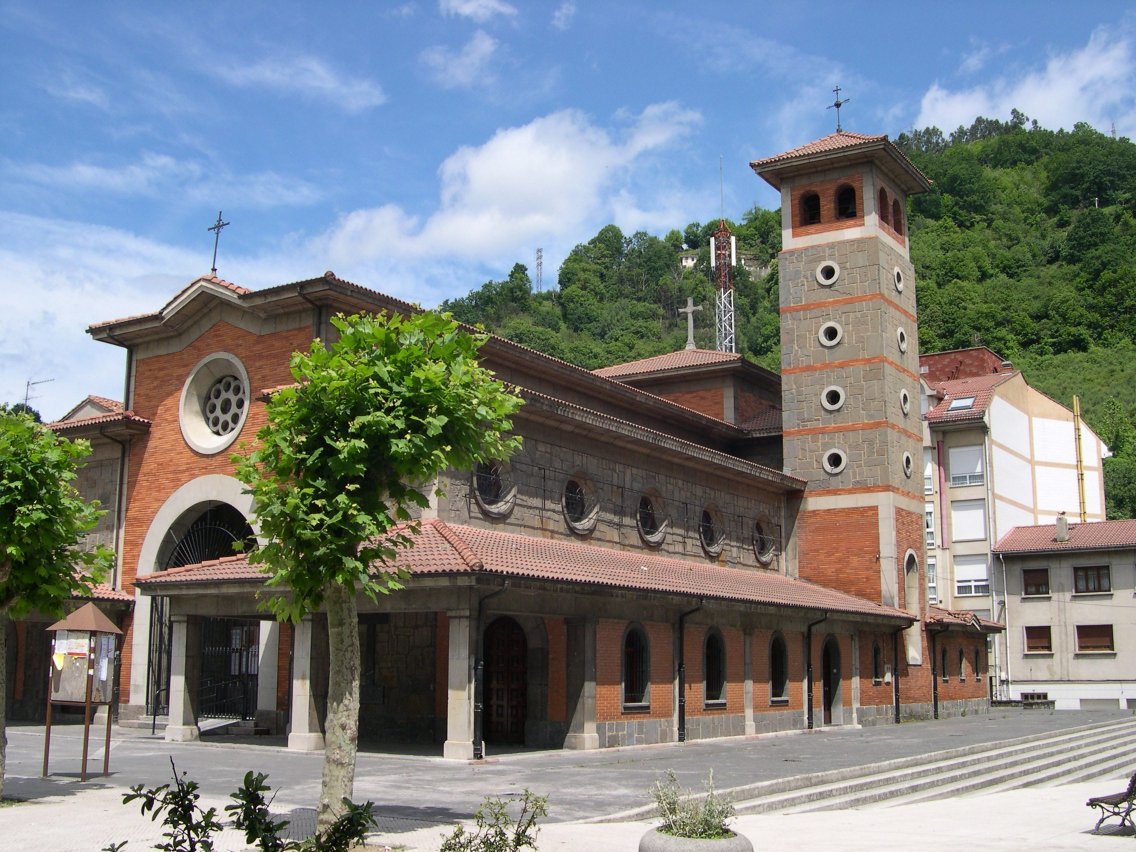
Church of San Martín de Tours

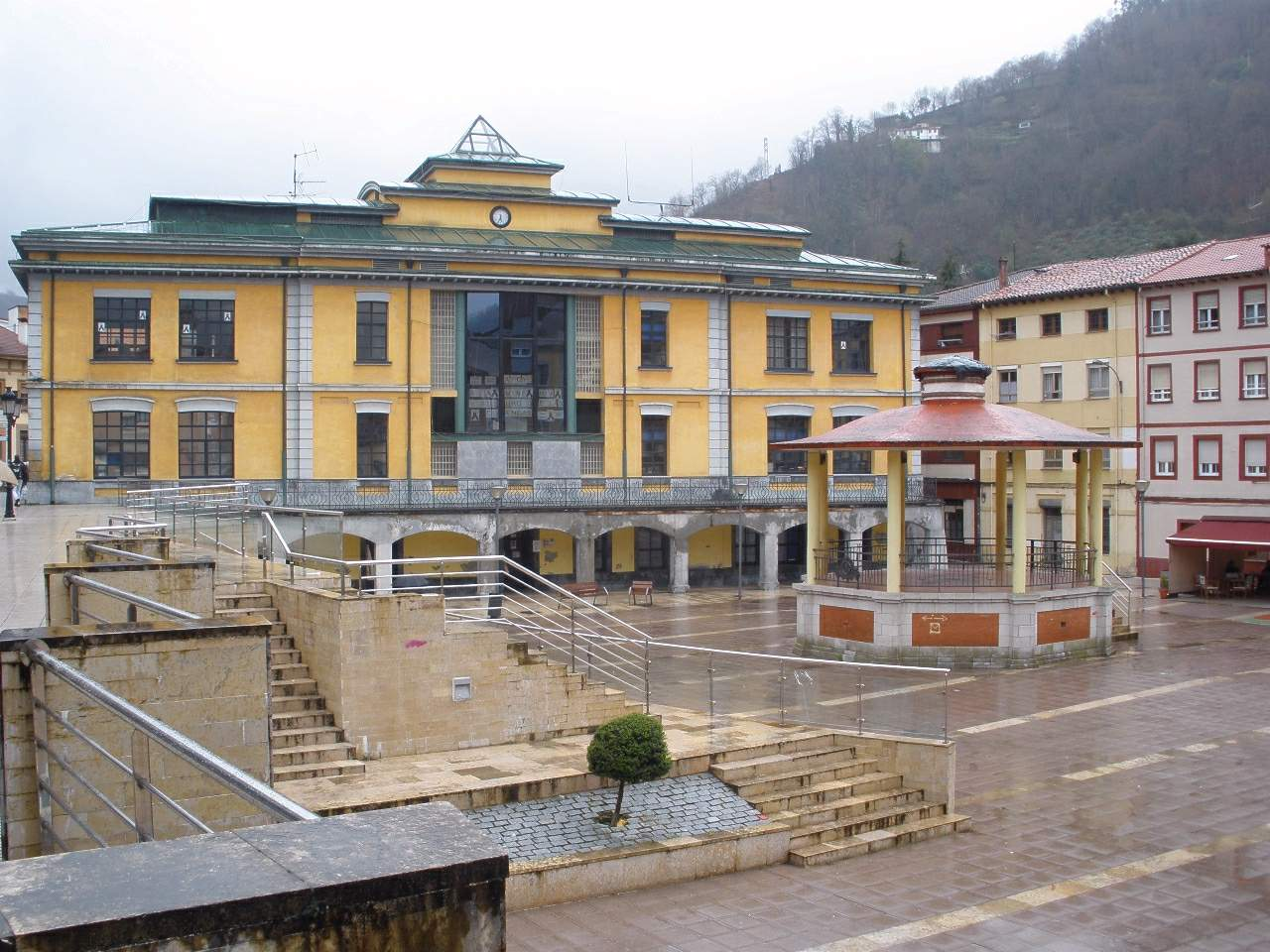
Town hall

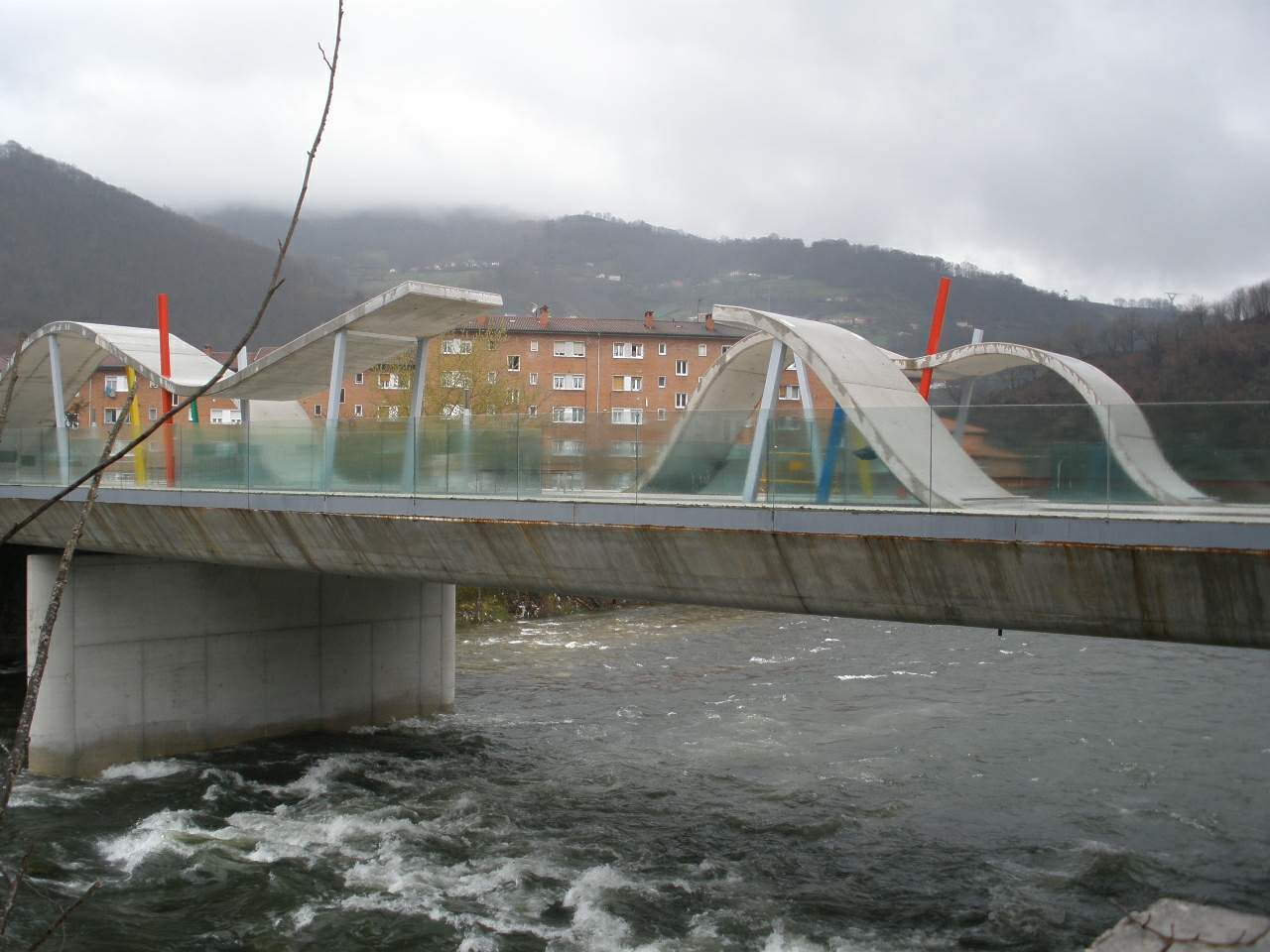
Bridge over the River Nalón
