= Aurelius of Asturias =

Aurelius
- King of Asturias
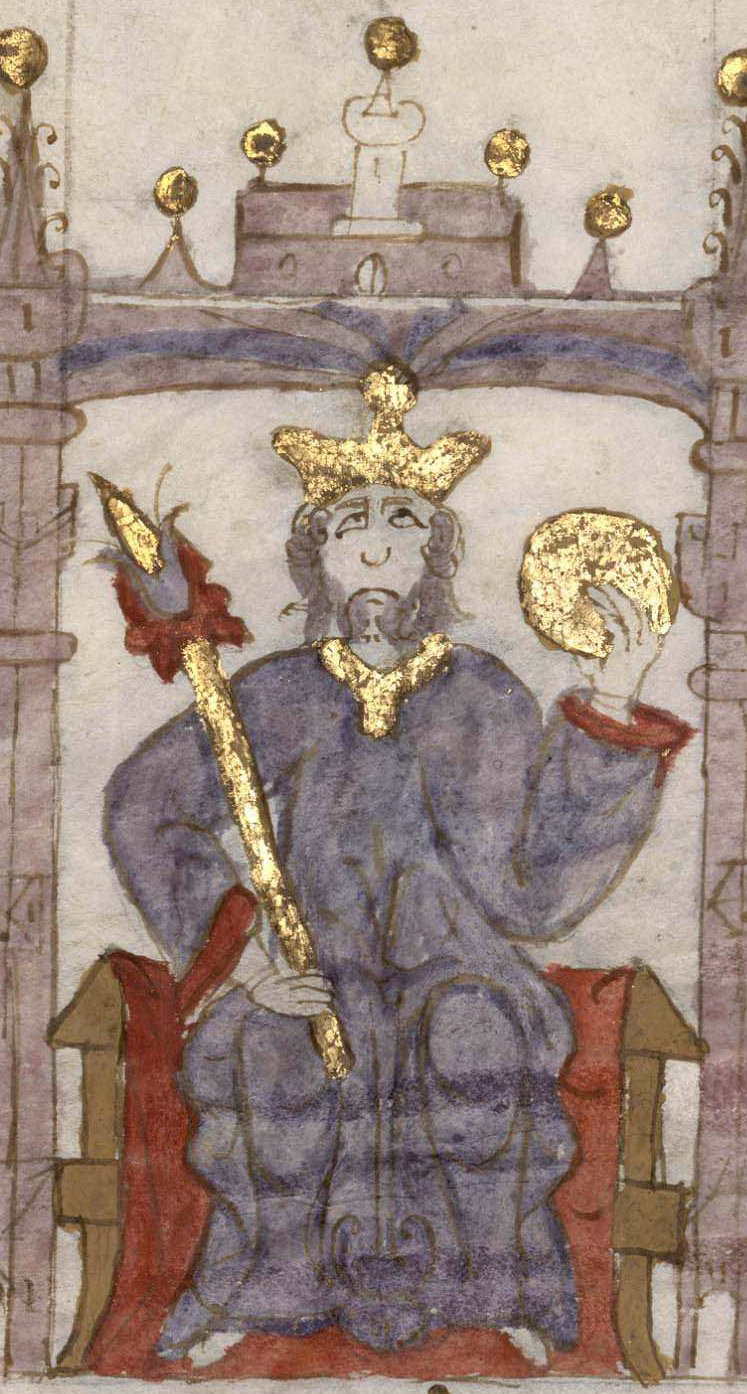
- Depiction in the Castilian manuscript Compendium of Chronicles of Kings, c. 1312–1325

King of Asturias
- Reign: 768–774
- Coronation: 768
- Predecessor: Fruela I of Asturias
- Successor: Silo of Asturias
- Born: c. 740; Asturias
- Died: 774; San Martín del Rey Aurelio
- Burial: uncertain location
- Dynasty: Astur-Leonese dynasty
- Father: Fruela of Cantabria
- Religion: Chalcedonian Christianity

Aurelius (Spanish: Aurelio) (c. 740 – 774) was the King of Asturias from 768 to his death. Born in León, he was the son of Fruela of Cantabria (son of Peter of Cantabria); nephew of Alfonso I of Asturias; and a cousin of his predecessor, Fruela I. His brother, Bermudo I, later reigned as king from 789 to 791.

Aurelius was chosen as king by the Asturian nobility after Fruela I's assassination. He is believed to have been crowned in Sama. His reign appears to have been relatively quiet and peaceful, attested to by the near-absence of mention of his reign in medieval chronicles. The only event of his reign narrated in the chronicles was a rebellion of serfs, which Aurelius put down. The location of the uprising is unknown, but it is the first recorded instance of anti-seignorial revolt in the history of the Iberian Peninsula. It is believed that, according to the custom of the times, he negotiated peace with the Muslims who dominated the lands to his south by an exchange of brides, which according to legend led to the place-name El Entrego, nowadays the heart of the municipality of San Martín del Rey Aurelio.

It would appear that his principal residence and the effective capital of Asturias during his reign was the municipality of San Martín del Rey Aurelio, then part of Langreo. Having reigned six years, Aurelius died there of natural causes in the year 774. The chronicles of the era make no mention of Aurelius having a wife or children. He was succeeded by his cousin-in-law, Silo, husband of Alfonso I's daughter Adosinda.

Historians disagree about the location of Aurelius's remains, as multiple medieval Asturian chronicles contradict one another. The Chronicle of Alfonso III claims that he was buried near his residence in the valley of Langreo, in the Church of San Martín de Tours, where there is a tomb engraved "Rey Aurelio." The Estoria de España or Primera Crónica General, written in the 13th century during the reign of Alfonso X of Castile, says that Aurelius' remains were entombed in the municipality of Cangas de Onís. Additionally, historian Esteban de Garibay asserts that Aurelius was entombed next to his father Fruela of Cantabria, in the now-destroyed church of San Miguel in Yanguas, a municipality of the Province of Soria.

== Sources ==
- Collins, Roger (2014). Caliphs and Kings Spain, 796-1031. Wiley. ISBN 9781118730010.
- Gran Enciclopedia Asturiana (1981) Editor: Silverio Cañada ISBN 84-7286-130-9

| Preceded by Fruela I | King of Asturias; 768–774 | Succeeded by Silo |
