= Fruela of Cantabria =

8th-century Count of Spain

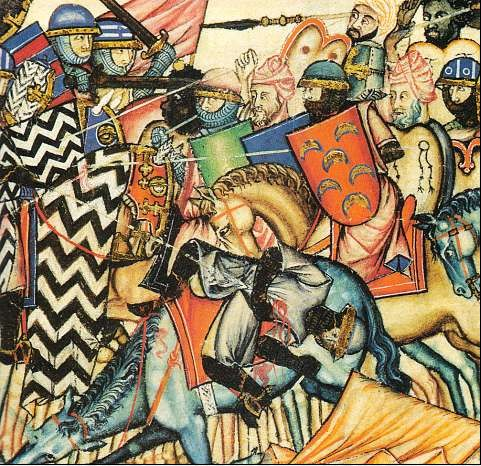
- A battle of the Reconquista from the Cantigas de Santa Maria
- Born: c. 708; Duchy of Cantabria
- Died: c. 756
- Family: Astur-Leonese dynasty
- Issue: Aurelius of Asturias Bermudo I of Asturias
- Father: Peter of Cantabria

Fruela of Cantabria or Fruela Pérez (c. 708 – c. 756) was the second son of Duke Peter of Cantabria and brother of King Alfonso I of Asturias.

== Biographical sketch ==
According to the Rotensis and Sebastianense versions of the Chronicle of Alfonso III, Fruela accompanied his brother King Alfonso in the incursions against the Muslim invaders and succeeded in conquering several cities, including Lugo, Tui, Porto, Braga, Viseu, Chaves, Ledesma, and other places.

== Family ==
The name of the mother of Fruela's children is not known. He had three children, these were:

- Bermudo I of Asturias;.
- Aurelius of Asturias.
- A daughter whose name is unknown who married a noble from Álava named Lope with whom she had a son García and a daughter, Munia of Álava, the wife of King Fruela I of Asturias. (Note: Ibn Hayyan in his work, Al-Muqtabis fi Tarikh al-Andalus describes a Muslim Razzia and mentions those who had been killed in battle. According to this source, in 816: "...was the campaign of Haib Abd al-Karim ibn Abd al Qahid ibn Mugut against the enemy of God Balasc al Yalasque (the Basque Velasco), lord of Pamplona (...) Many of them died, including Garsiya Ibn Lubb (García López), son of a sister of Barmud (Bermudo I of Asturias), the maternal uncle of Idfuns (King Alfonso II of Asturias)". Alfonso's mother is known from other sources to have been named Munia, and to have been from Álava.)

== Bibliography ==
- Besga Marroquín, Armando (2000). Orígenes hispanogodos del Reino de Asturias. Oviedo: Real Instituto de Estudios Asturianos. ISBN 84-8964-541-8.
- Martínez Díez, Gonzalo (2004). El Condado de Castilla (711-1038). La historia frente a la leyenda (in Spanish). Valladolid: Junta de Castilla y León. ISBN 84-9718-275-8.
