= EI San Martín =

Association football club in Spain

Coordinates: 43.275407°N 5.595104°W

San Martín
- Full name: Escuela de Iniciación San Martín
- Founded: 2012
- Ground: Estadio El Florán, Sotrondio, Asturias, Spain
- Capacity: 5,000
- Chairman: Montserrat Martínez Camblor
- Manager: Chiqui de Paz
- League: Tercera Federación – Group 2
- 2025–26: Tercera Federación – Group 2, 6th of 18
Home colours	Away colours

Escuela de Iniciación San Martín (English: School of Initiation San Martín) is a Spanish football club based in Sotrondio, San Martín del Rey Aurelio in the autonomous community of Asturias. Founded in 2012, San Martín plays in Tercera Federación – Group 2, holding its home games at Estadio El Florán.

== History ==
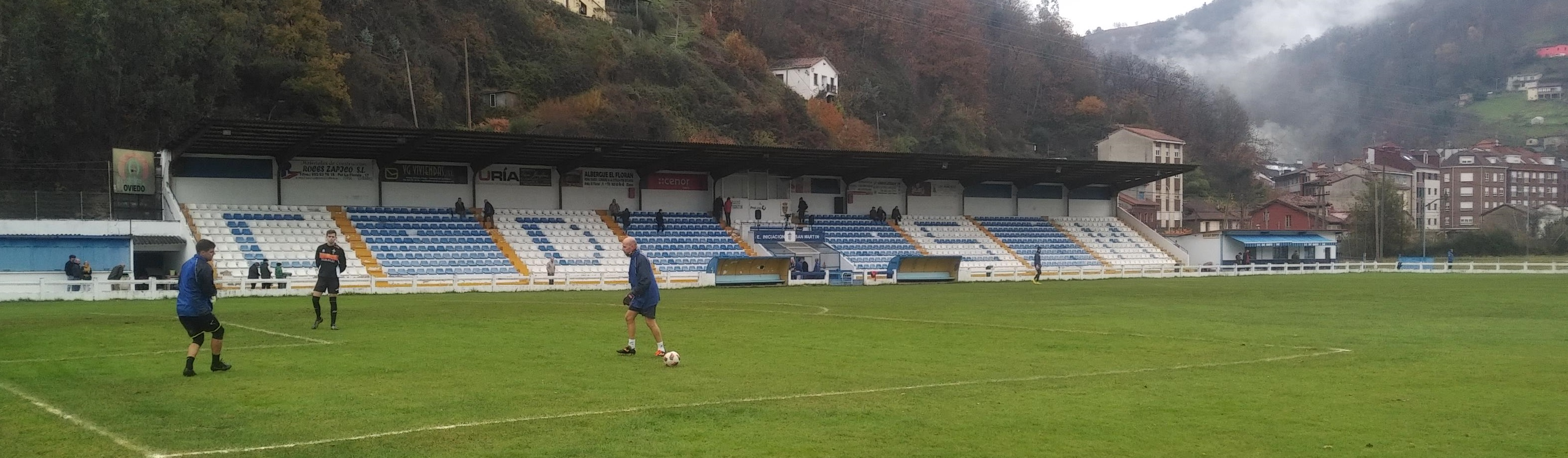
Estadio El Florán

Following the dissolution of Club Deportivo San Martín(founded 1950) because of financial trouble, former members of the club decided to create a new team with the name of Escuela de Iniciación San Martín in July 2012.

The club finished their first season in the lowest division without loss. After three promotions in five years, the club was promoted in May 2017 to the Tercera División.

== Season to season ==
Season	Tier	Division	Place	Copa del Rey
2012–13	7	2ª Reg.	1st	
2013–14	6	1ª Reg.	2nd	
2014–15	5	Reg. Pref.	6th	
2015–16	5	Reg. Pref.	5th	
2016–17	5	Reg. Pref.	3rd	
2017–18	4	3ª	10th	
2018–19	4	3ª	15th	
2019–20	4	3ª	18th	
2020–21	4	3ª	2nd / 4th	
2021–22	5	3ª RFEF	15th	
2022–23	6	1ª RFFPA	13th	
2023–24	6	1ª Astur.	2nd	
2024–25	5	3ª Fed.	14th	
2025–26	5	3ª Fed.	6th	
2026–27	5	3ª Fed.		

- 4 seasons in Tercera División
- 4 seasons in Tercera Federación/Tercera División RFEF
