= Iglesia de San Martín de Escoto (Llames de Parres) =

- Iglesia de San Martín de Escoto (Llames de Parres)
- 43.35624°N 5.21619°W
- Location: Asturias, Spain

San Martín de Escoto is a church located near Soto de Dueñas in the territory of the municipality of Llames de Parres (Parres) in Asturias, Spain.

The church apparently became linked to an adjacent Benedictine nunnery that was once located on the church grounds. It was rebuilt in the 16th century.

== See also ==
- Asturian art
- Catholic Church in Spain
- Churches in Asturias
- List of oldest church buildings
