= Miguel Ramos (disambiguation) =

Miguel Ramos (born 1971) is a Portuguese racing driver.

Miguel Ramos may also refer to:

- Miguel Ramos Arizpe (1775–1843), Mexican priest and politician
- Miguel Ramos Carrión (1848–1915), Spanish playwright and journalist, collaborated with Vital Aza
- Miguel Ramos Corrada (1949–2013), Spanish philologist
- Miguel Ramos Vargas ("Migueli", 1942–2002), Spanish footballer

== See also ==
- Miguel Giménez Igualada, pen name of Miguel Ramos Giménez (1888–1973), Spanish anarchist writer
