= Graciano Antuña =

Spanish politician (1903–1937)

Graciano Antuña (1903 in L'Entregu, Asturias – May 13, 1937) was a Spanish union socialist politician.

He participated in the direction of the Alianza Obera committee during the 1934 revolution in Asturias. He was President of the Asturian Socialist Federation of the Spanish Socialist Workers' Party and Secretary General of the Sindicato de Obreros Mineros de Asturias. The failure of the 1934 revolt forced to him to exile to France. In 1936, however he was delegated to the Congress of Deputies

During the Spanish Civil War in 1936 he was caught in Oviedo on 20 July, and killed the following May.
