= Cofiñu =

- Parish
- Location within Spain
- Coordinates: 43.416667°N 5.216667°W
- Country: Spain
- Autonomous community: Asturias
- Province: Asturias
- Municipality: Parres

Cofiñu is one of 17 parishes (administrative divisions) in Parres, a municipality within the province and autonomous community of Asturias, in northern Spain.
