= Blimea =

Coordinates: 43.2725°N 5.588889°W

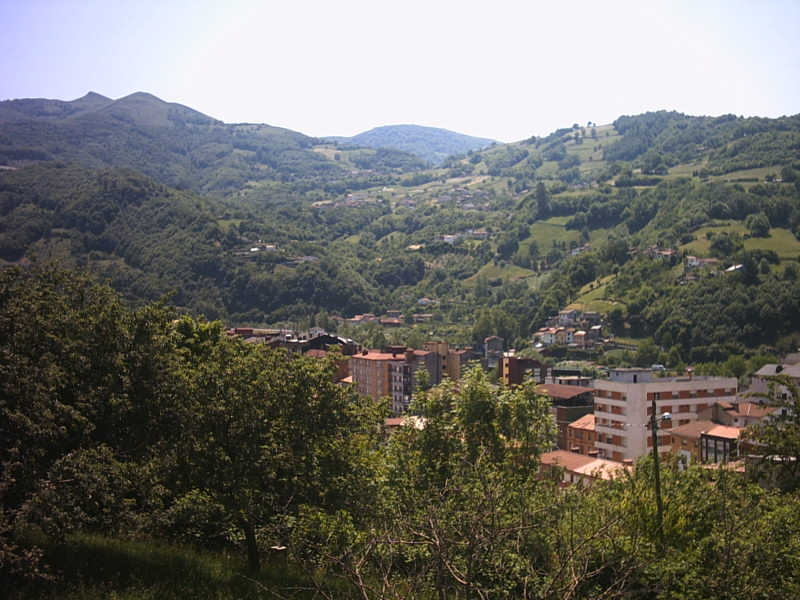
View of Blimea

Blimea is the most eastern parish of the San Martín del Rey Aurelio council. By Decree Law December 2007, the town of Blimea joins El Entrego and Sotrondio to form the town of San Martín, being the town of Blimea one of its districts.

Blimea is a place name emerged from many Asturian words with different phonetic variants translated into Castilian word "wicker" such as bima, blima, brima, blimba or bilma. From the etymological point of view, wicker part of Latin "vimen - viminis" and in the Asturian case is influenced belime, "wheat residue" and bilimia, "drill", "Beria". It would therefore be an area where blima was abundant. Nalón river divides into two large halves and forms a broad plain which is where Blimea, capital of the parish rises.

It is 9.66 km^{2} (3.73 sq mi) in size, with a population of 3,867 inhabitants (INE 2005).

== Villages and hamlets ==
- L'Agüeria
- L'Almuriu
- Blimea
- Burganeo
- Caraveo
- Cegontín
- El Cepeal
- El Cantu
- El Colláu
- El Cuillu
- El Miru
- El Nietu
- El Portillu
- El Ronzón
- El Sutu
- Faeo
- Fariseo
- Felguera
- Felguerosa
- Fuente Felguera
- La Biomba
- La Bobia
- La Cabañina
- La Cabezá
- La Cabiella
- La Casilla
- La Chirente
- La Milana
- La Molatera
- La Mosnera
- El Payarín
- La Payega
- La Peña
- La Peruyal
- La Quintana
- Les Quintanes
- La Segá
- La Teyera
- Laisancho
- Les Abeyes
- Les Aparaes
- Les Canales
- Les Quintanes
- Les Tercies
- Llai
- Los Cagüernos
- Los Melchores
- Peñacorvera
- La Raposera
- Ricao
- Riegalatabla
- Sanamiés
- San Roque
- El Sortiru
- La Xerra
- Sienra
- Villalaz
