= Manuel González García =

Manuel González García may refer to:

- Manuel Asur (Manuel Asur González García, born 1947), Spanish essayist and poet
- Manuel González García (bishop) (1877–1940), Spanish bishop
