= Fíos =

- Parish
- Location within Spain
- Coordinates: 43.4°N 5.233333°W
- Country: Spain
- Autonomous community: Asturias
- Province: Asturias
- Municipality: Parres

Fíos is one of 17 parishes (administrative divisions) in Parres, a municipality within the province and autonomous community of Asturias, in northern Spain.
