= Cocañín =

Parish in Asturias, Spain

Coordinates: 43.3°N 5.6°W

Cocañín (variant: Cocaño) is one of five parishes (administrative divisions) in San Martín del Rey Aurelio, a municipality within the province and autonomous community of Asturias, in northern Spain.

It is 9.86 km^{2} (3.81 sq mi) in size, with a population of 1,046 (INE 2005).

== Villages ==
The villages and hamlets include: La Güeria, Los Artos, Brañella, La Cabañina, La Cabañona, El Caleyu, La Casanueva, La Casorra, La Casuca, Ciriego, Cocañín, Cocaño, El Contu, El Contu Baxo, El Contu Medio, La Correoria, El Corvero, La Cotariella, La Encarná, Fatorgá, La Faya, Les Felechoses, La Güerta, L'Hedráu, La Ifrera, La Llonga, El Llanu, La Lloseta, La Malena, Ordiales, Pedroco, Piñera, El Pullíu, La Quemá, El Rebollal, El Rosellón, La Rina, EL Riusgüés, Roíles, La Rotella, La Sagosa, Solallonga, La Vallina, La Vaúba and Ximiniz.
