= Academy of the Asturian Language =

Asturian Institution

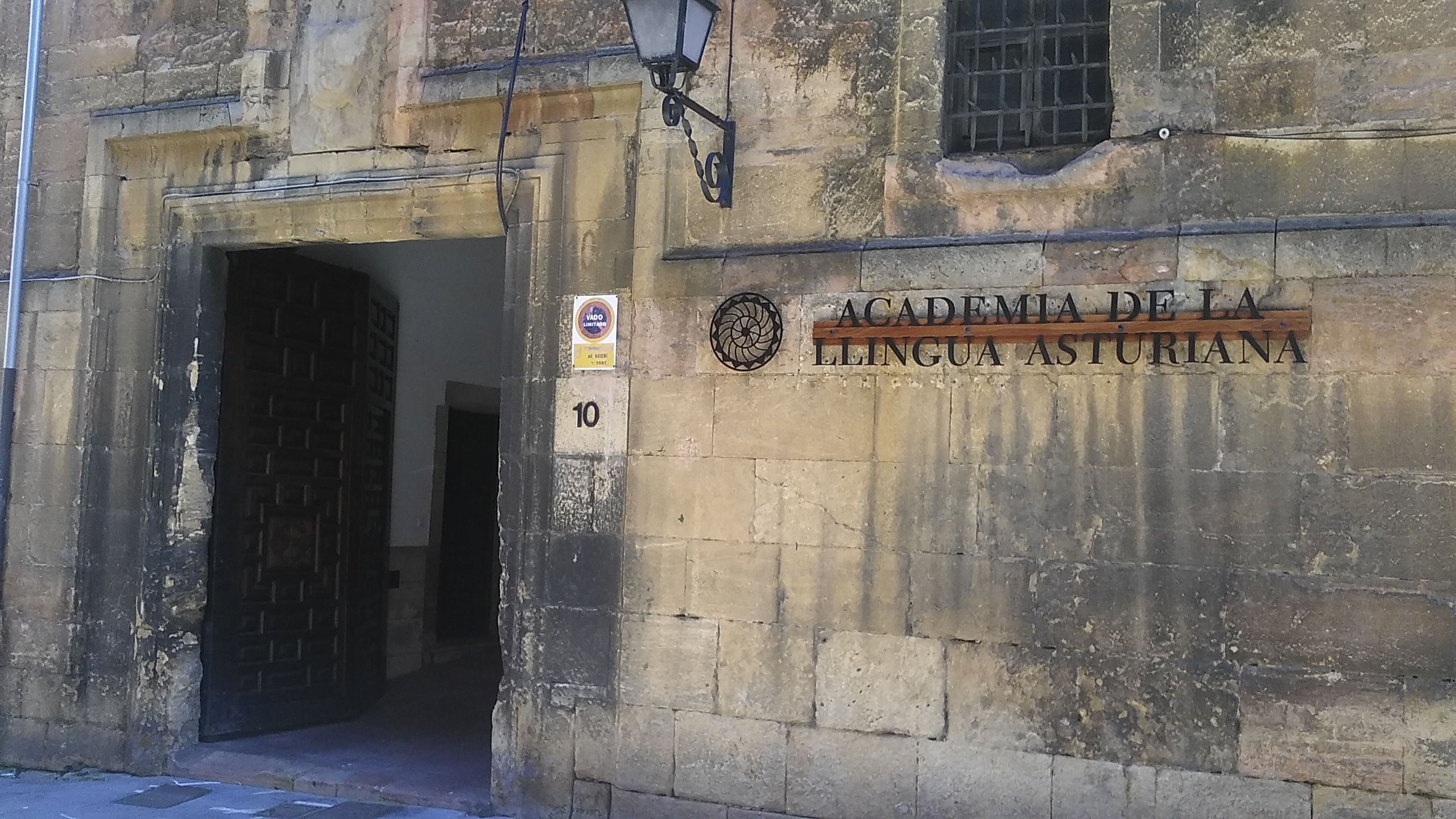
Current headquarters at Oviedo

Victor speaking Asturian.

The Academia de la Llingua Asturiana or Academy of the Asturian Language (ALLA) is an Official Institution of the Government of the Principality of Asturias that promotes and regulates the Asturian language, a language of the Spanish autonomous community of Asturias. Among its principal objectives are investigating and normalising the Asturian Language, developing a dictionary, promoting its use and education and awarding literary prizes. It has 21 full members, 19 foreign members and 15 honorary members, and its current (as of 2017) president is Xosé Antón González Riaño.

== History ==
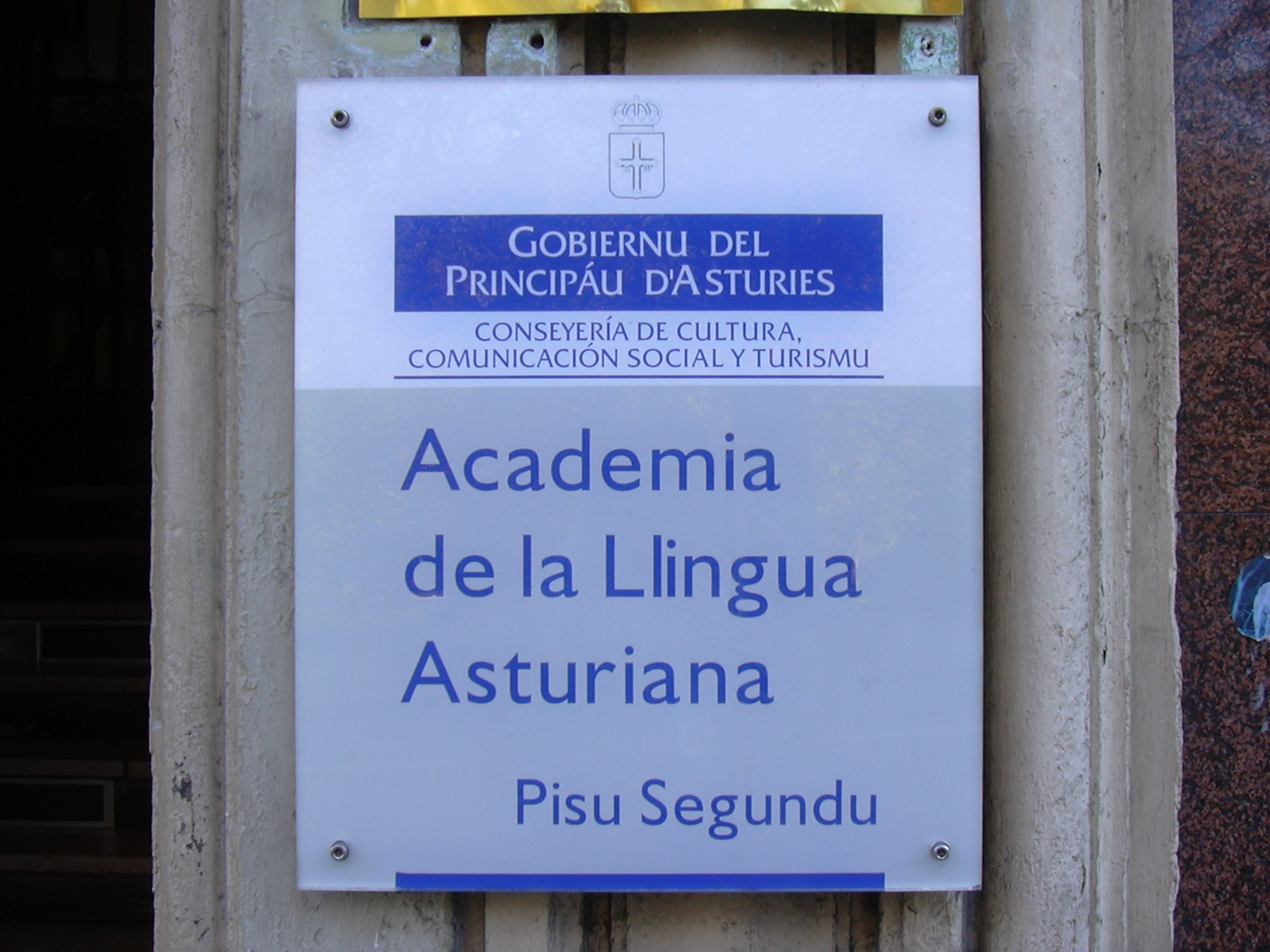
The sign in front of the old offices in Oviedo

ALLA first notice appears in the 18th century, when Gaspar Melchor de Jovellanos and Carlos González de Posada talk in their letters about the idea of creating it in 1791. Jovellanos' project, however, was aborted because of his imprisonment in Mallorca.

In 1920s the Real Academia Asturiana de las Artes y las Letras (Royal Academy of Asturian Arts and Letters) was created by some intellectuals, including José Antonio García Peláez (Pin de Pría). It was divided in four sections and its principal objectives were to create an Asturian dictionary and grammar and to publish a magazine. Other sections were dedicated to promoting Asturian literature, theatre and music.

But it was from 1980 when the Asturian pre-autonomous government, the Consejo Regional, approved the creation of the ALLA, founded 15 December of the same year. Xosé Lluis García Arias was its first president from that moment until 2001 when Ana Cano took over from him.

== Works ==
In 1981 the Normes Ortográfiques y Conxugación de Verbos (Orthographic Norms and Verb Conjugation), the first academic work, was published. Other publications followed, such as the Gramática de la Llingua Asturiana (Asturian Language Grammar) in 1998 and the Diccionariu de la Llingua Asturiana (Asturian Language Dictionary) in 2000, also known as «DALLA».

The ALLA also publish:

- a bulletin featuring literary and linguistic studies about the Asturian language, called Lletres Asturianes (Asturian Letters),
- and another one with anthropological studies about Asturias: Cultures.

It also works as an editorial house, with book collections, such as:

- Escolín (Student, children literature),
- Llibrería facsimilar (Facsimile library),
- Cartafueyos de lliteratura escaecida (Notes on forgotten literature, ancient works in Asturian Language),
- Llibrería llingüística (Linguistic Library, linguistic studies) ,
- or Llibrería académica (Academical library, literature).

It also organised every year the Dia de les lletres asturianes (Day of Asturian Letters) since 1982, on the first Friday of May.

== List of members ==
As of 2008, this is the complete list of members of the Academy of Asturian Language

=== Full members ===
- Genaro Alonso Megido
- Lluis Xabel Álvarez Fernández
- Ramón d'Andrés Díaz
- Emilio Barriuso Fernández
- Xosé Bolado García
- Ana María Cano González
- Javier Fernández Conde
- Xosé Lluis García Arias
- Vicente García Oliva
- Manuel Asur González García
- Xosé Antón González Riaño
- Roberto González-Quevedo González
- Xosé Ramón Iglesias Cueva
- Carlos Lastra López
- Francisco José Llera Ramo
- Pablo Xuan Manzano Rodríguez
- Josefina Martínez Álvarez
- Miguel Ramos Corrada
- Urbano Rodríguez Vázquez
- Carlos Rubiera Tuya
- Xuan Xosé Sánchez Vicente
- Isabel Torrente Fernández
- Mª Josefa Canellada Llavona (†)
- Lorenzo Novo Mier (†)

=== Foreign members ===
- Lourdes Álvarez García
- Xuan Bello Fernán
- Xurde Blanco Puente
- Adolfo Camilo Díaz López
- José Antonio Fernández Vior
- Félix Ferreiro Currás
- Xosé Ignaciu Fonseca Alonso
- Ernesto García del Castillo
- Corsino García Gutiérrez
- Mª Esther García López
- Xulio Llaneza Fernández
- Alfonso Martín Caso
- Próspero Morán López
- Marta Mori de Arriba
- Felipe Prieto García
- David M. Rivas Infante
- Vicente Rodríguez Hevia
- Miguel Solís Santos
- Juan Carlos Villaverde Amieva
- Xosé Álvarez Fernández (†)
- Manuel d'Andrés Fernández (†)
- Andrés Solar Santurio (†)

=== Honorary members ===
- José Aurelio Álvarez Fernández
- The President of the Coleutivu Manuel Fernández de Castro
- The President of Euskaltzaindia
- James W. Fernández McClintock
- Xulián Fernández Montes
- Hevia
- Raimundo Fernández Rodríguez
- Manuel García-Galano
- Michael Metzeltin
- The President of the Institut d'Estudis Catalans
- Jesús Landeira
- Júlio Meirinhos
- Celso Muñiz
- The President of the Real Academia Española
- The President of the Real Academia Galega
- Emilio Alarcos Llorach (†)
- Álvaro Galmés de Fuentes (†)
- Joaquín Manzanares Rodríguez-Mir (†)
- José Luis Pensado Tomé (†)
- Alonso Zamora Vicente (†)

== Reference publications ==
- Academia de la Llingua Asturiana (1993). Normes Ortográfiques y Conxugación de Verbos (4th ed.) . ALLA ISBN 84-86936-95-0
- Academia de la Llingua Asturiana (1999). Gramática de la Llingua Asturiana (2nd ed.). ALLA ISBN 84-8168-160-1
- Academia de la Llingua Asturiana (2000). Diccionariu de la llingua asturiana. ALLA ISBN 84-8168-208-X
