= Santitomás =

- Parish
- Location within Spain
- Coordinates: 43.416667°N 5.183333°W
- Country: Spain
- Autonomous community: Asturias
- Province: Asturias
- Municipality: Parres

Santitomás (Spanish: Collía) is one of 17 parishes (administrative divisions) in Parres, a municipality within the province and autonomous community of Asturias, in northern Spain.

== Villages ==
- Bodes
- Collía
- El Colláu
- Les Corones
- Montalea
- La Vita
