= Santa Bárbara (San Martín) =

Coordinates: 43.25°N 5.616667°W

Santa Bárbara is one of five parishes (administrative divisions) in San Martín del Rey Aurelio, a municipality within the province and autonomous community of Asturias, in northern Spain.

It is 18.51 km^{2} (7.15 sq mi) in size, with a population of 533 (INE 2005).

== Villages and hamlets ==
- Batán (El Batán)
- Canto las Matas (El Cantu Les Mates)
- Casanueva (Casa Nueva)
- Casacima (La Casa Cima)
- Casas de Abajo (Les Cases de Baxo)
- Cruz (La Cruz)
- El Canto (El Cantu)
- El Collado Escobal (El Colláu Escobal)
- El Corralón
- El Costayo (El Costayu)
- El Edrado (L'Hedráu)
- El Escobal (L'Escobal)
- El Molino (El Molín)
- El Pradón (El Praón)
- Riocerezal (El Riocerezal)
- El Vericioso (El Bericiusu)
- La Casuca
- La Caya
- La Espesura
- La Estaca
- La Gallega
- La Nespral
- La Pared (La Paré)
- La Potoxa
- La Rebollada (La Robellá)
- La Restinga
- La Zorea (L'Azorea)
- Las Argayadas (Les Argayaes)
- Los Caleyos
- Miera de Arriba (Miera Riba)
- Paniceres
- Perabeles de Abajo (Perabeles)
- Perabeles de Arriba (Les C a. C.ima)
- Riocerezalero (El Rezaleru)
- Santa Bárbara (Santa Bárbola)
- Sayetas (Les Sayetes)
- Seca del Agua (La Seca l'Agua)
- Socavón
- Vallicalagua (La Vallica l'Agua)
- Veró
