= Church of St Martin of Tours (San Martín del Rey Aurelio) =

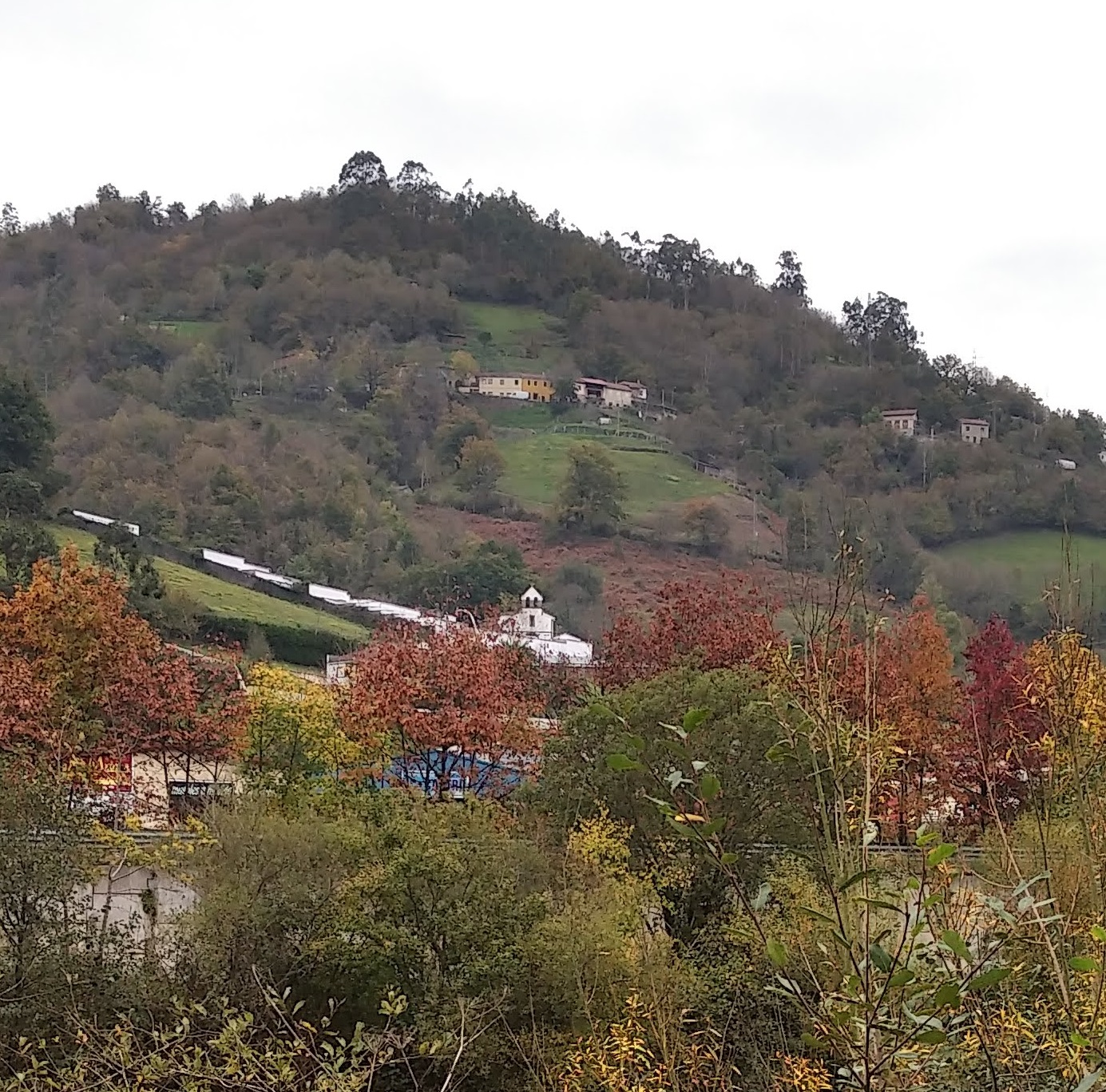
- San Martín Sotrondio
- Church of St Martin of Tours
- Location: Asturias, Spain
- Denomination: Roman Catholic

History
- Dedication: St Martin of Tours

San Martín de Tours is a rural Roman Catholic parish church in the parish of San Martín, near Sotrondio, in the territory of the municipality of San Martín del Rey Aurelio in Asturias, Spain.

The exterior of the building is white, except the doors and other openings which are masonry. At the top is a belfry.

== History ==
The municipality hosted a royal residence in medieval times and is named after King Aurelius of Asturias. The first church at the site was likely erected in the 9th century in a pre-Romanesque style. The present church was built over the centuries: since its original building it has undergone several reforms. The church was rebuilt after being subject to arson during the Spanish Civil War.

== See also ==
- Asturian art
- Catholic Church in Spain
