= Bermudo I of Asturias =

Bermudo I
- King of Asturias
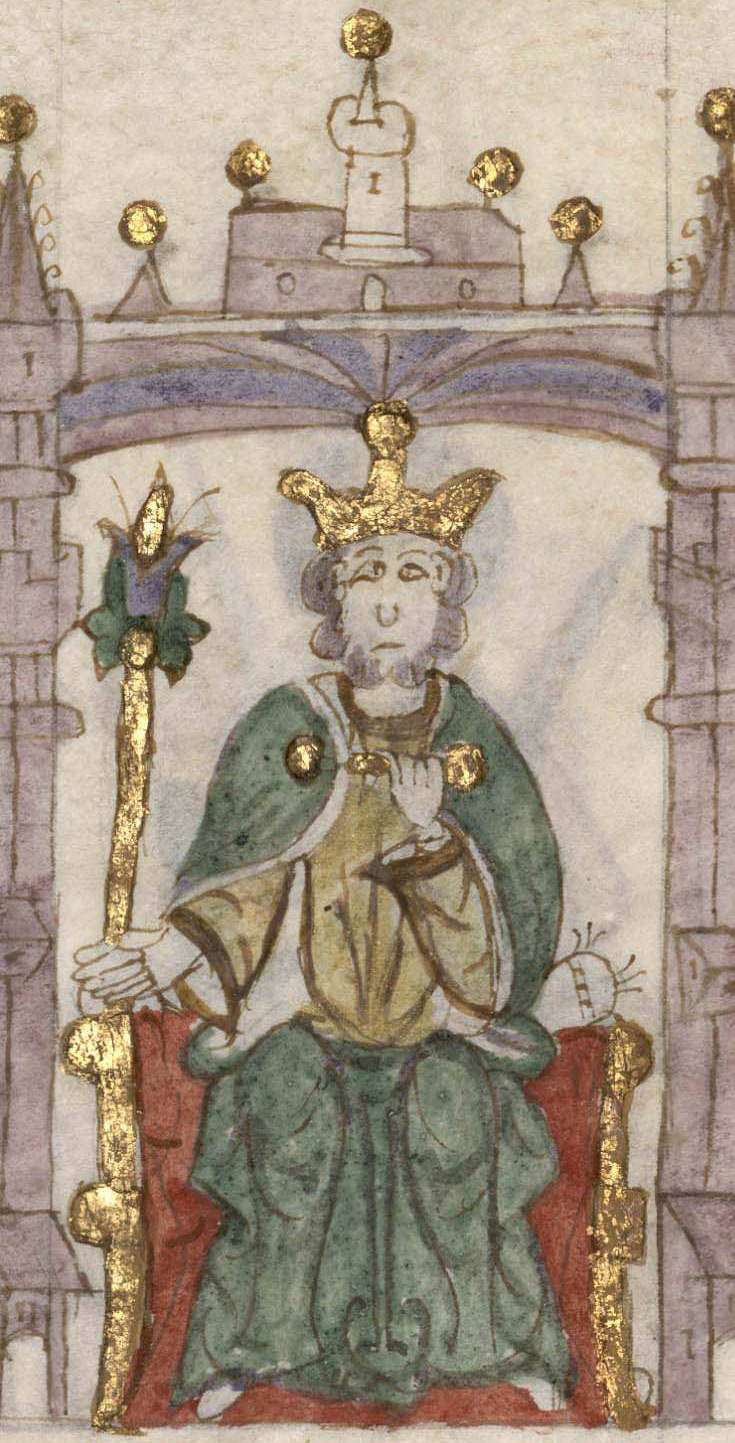
- Depiction in the Castilian manuscript Compendium of Chronicles of Kings, c. 1312–1325

King of Asturias
- Reign: 789–791
- Predecessor: Mauregatus
- Successor: Alfonso II
- Born: c. 750
- Died: 797; Oviedo
- Issue: Ramiro I
- Dynasty: Astur-Leonese dynasty
- Father: Fruela of Cantabria
- Religion: Chalcedonian Christianity

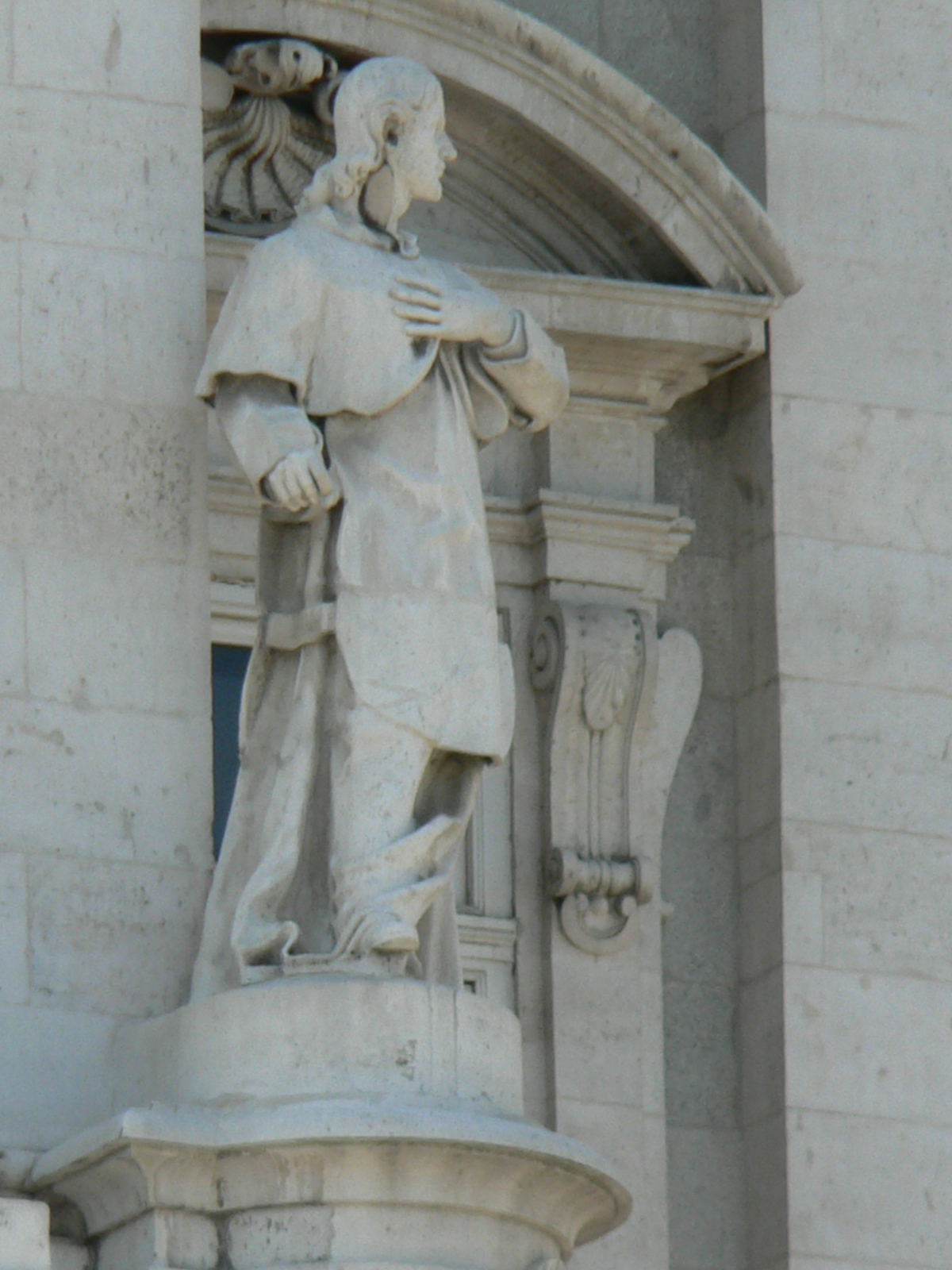
Statue of Bermudo I in the north facade of the main floor of the Royal Palace of Madrid.

Bermudo I (also Vermudo or Veremund), called the Deacon or the Monk (c. 750 – 797), was the King of Asturias from 788 or 789 until his abdication in 791. He was a son of Fruela of Cantabria, a nephew of Alfonso I, and a brother of Aurelius. The nature of the end of his reign ushered in a new period in Asturian-Arab relations.

Bermudo was elected by the palatine officials (the nobility of the royal palace) to replace Mauregatus, who had died of natural causes in 788. Since Mauregatus had ascended the throne in a coup d'état with regional support in 783 and the succession of Bermudo proceeded without incident, it is probable that Mauregatus had procured a change in the ranks of the palatine nobility and that Bermudo was thus put forward as the candidate to, like Mauregatus, prevent the succession of Alfonso II, the son and heir of Fruela I. Though the Chronicle of Alfonso III in both its extant versions makes Bermudo out to be a deacon at his succession, this fact would only reinforce the notion that his election was a determined move to oppose Alfonso.

In any case, he did not reign long. He was forced to defend against an Arab-Berber invasion of Álava and Galicia and was defeated at the Battle of the Burbia River, probably the Bierzo, in 791. Though the closest Christian sources do not name his opponents, the battle can be linked with the first major engagement of a series of aggressive campaigns launched against the Asturian kingdom in the 790s. The Muslim commander at Burbia is named in Ibn al-Athir as Yūsuf ibn Bukht and the battle is likewise recorded in al-Maqqarī. Bermudo abdicated his throne after his defeat, though whether volitionally (as the Chronicle of Alfonso III states, "because he was [or remembered he was] a deacon") or under duress is unknown. Historically in Spain under the Visigoths, a king of proven military inadequacy was often forced to abdicate. Nevertheless, he was considered a generous and illustrious man in his time, "merciful and pious" in the words of the Chronicle of Albelda.

Bermudo was succeeded by Alfonso II and he left behind a son, who later reigned as Ramiro I, by an anonymous wife. He reportedly lived for a long time after his abdication, perhaps as a monk, and on good terms with his successor.

== Sources ==
- Collins, Roger (2014). Caliphs and Kings Spain, 796-1031. Wiley. ISBN 9781118730010.
- Venning, Timothy (2017). A Chronology of Early Medieval Western Europe, 450–1066. Taylor & Francis. ISBN 9781351589161.

Preceded by Mauregatus	King of Asturias; 788–791	Succeeded by Alfonso II
