= Cubia (river) =

River in Asturias, Spain

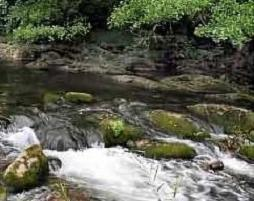
- View of Cubia River.

Location
- Country: Spain
- State: Asturias
- Region: Tolinas

Physical characteristics
- Source
  - elevation: 1,300 m (4,300 ft)
- Mouth
  - location: Nalón River
- Length: 41 km (25 mi)
- Basin size: 210 km^{2} (81 sq mi)

The Cubia is a river in northern Spain flowing through the Autonomous Community of Asturias.
