= Ana Cano =

Spanish philologist

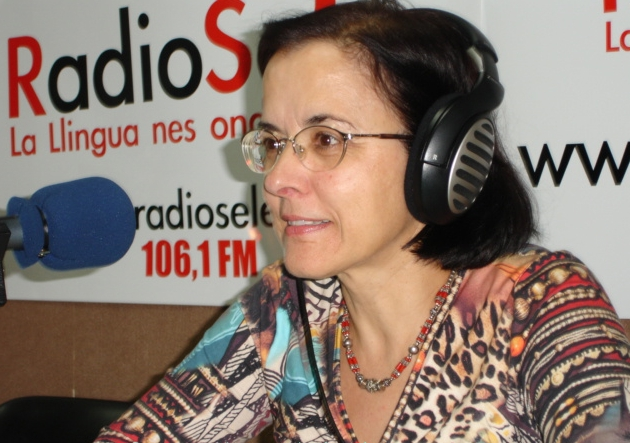
- Born: Ana María Cano González; 12 May 1950 (age 76); Somiedo, Asturias, Spanish State
- Education: University of Oviedo
- Occupations: philologist, Dean of Philology at the University of Oviedo

Ana María Cano González (Villarín, Somiedo, Asturias, 12 May 1950) is a Spanish philologist. She was dean of the faculty of Philology of the University of Oviedo and chair of romance philology. She received her master's degree in primary education in 1967, after exerting this profession, a license in philosophy and letters from the University of Oviedo in 1972, and a doctorate at the same institution in 1975, cum laude, with a thesis on "The speech of Somiedo". Since 2001, she has been president of the Academy of the Asturian Language.

== Selected works ==
- El habla de Somiedo (1975)
- Vocabulario del bable de Somiedo (1982)
- Averamientu a la hestoria de la llingua asturiana (1987)
- Notas de Folklor Somedán (1989)
- Estudios de diacronía asturiana (2008)
- El habla de Somiedo (occidente de Asturias) (2009)
