= Miguel Ramos Corrada =

Spanish academic

Miguel Ramos Corrada was a Spanish academic, born in 1949 in Llerandi (near Parres, Asturies, Spain). He lived in Xixón, where he died in 2013.

He graduated in Romance Philology from Oviedo University in 1971, and received his doctorate in 1983 with his thesis about Pepín de Pría. In 1984 he became a member of the Academy of the Asturian Language, and was president from 2000 to 2001.

Corrada was a professor of language and literature at both the National University of Distance Education and Oviedo University.

== Selected works ==
- Sociedad y literatura bable, 1839–1936 (1982)
- Pría, Pepín de; Obres completes / José García Peláez (Pepín de Pría) (1993)
- La formación del concepto de historia de la literatura nacional española: las aportaciones de Pedro J. Pidal y Antonio Gil de Zárate (2001)
