= L'Entregu =

Coordinates: 43.2875°N 5.638889°W

L'Entregu L'Entregu
- Town
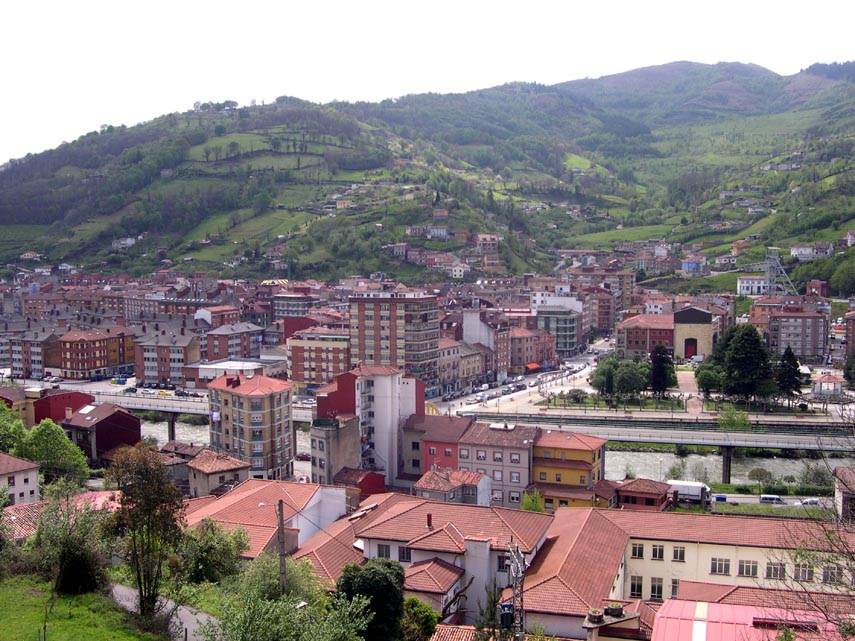
- Aerial view of the town
- Interactive map of L'Entregu
- Country: Spain
- Autonomous community: Asturias
- Province: Asturias
- Municipality: San Martín del Rey Aurelio
- Parish: Linares

Population (2009)
  - Total: 7,346

L'Entregu (Spanish: El Entrego, "the Hand-over") is a town and urban center in San Martín del Rey Aurelio, Asturias, Spain. In September 2007, by a decree of the Principality of Asturias, L'Entregu joined the adjacent Sotrondio and Blimea to form a single population center of San Martin del Rey name Aurelio as a homonymous municipality. In 2008, legislation was passed that established the official name of the town as bilingual, being thereafter known as L'Entregu. According to the Gazetteer of 2009, the population was 7,346 in L'Entregu and the combined population within the parish of Linares was 9,177.

The towns contains a main urban grid layout and several adjacent neighborhoods. The entrance to the town is known as the neighborhood Fradera (also Fielato). Landmarks include Park La Laguna and Iglesia de San Andrés. The Mining Museum of Asturias is located in the San Vicente neighborhood; it is the second most visited museum in Asturias. Nalón Road runs parallel with Nalón River. L'Entregu CF is the local football club.

== Notable people ==
- Graciano Antuña (1903 - 1937), Spanish union socialist politician.
- Pablo Xuan Manzano Rodríguez (1948-), scholar of Asturian language and culture

== Gallery ==
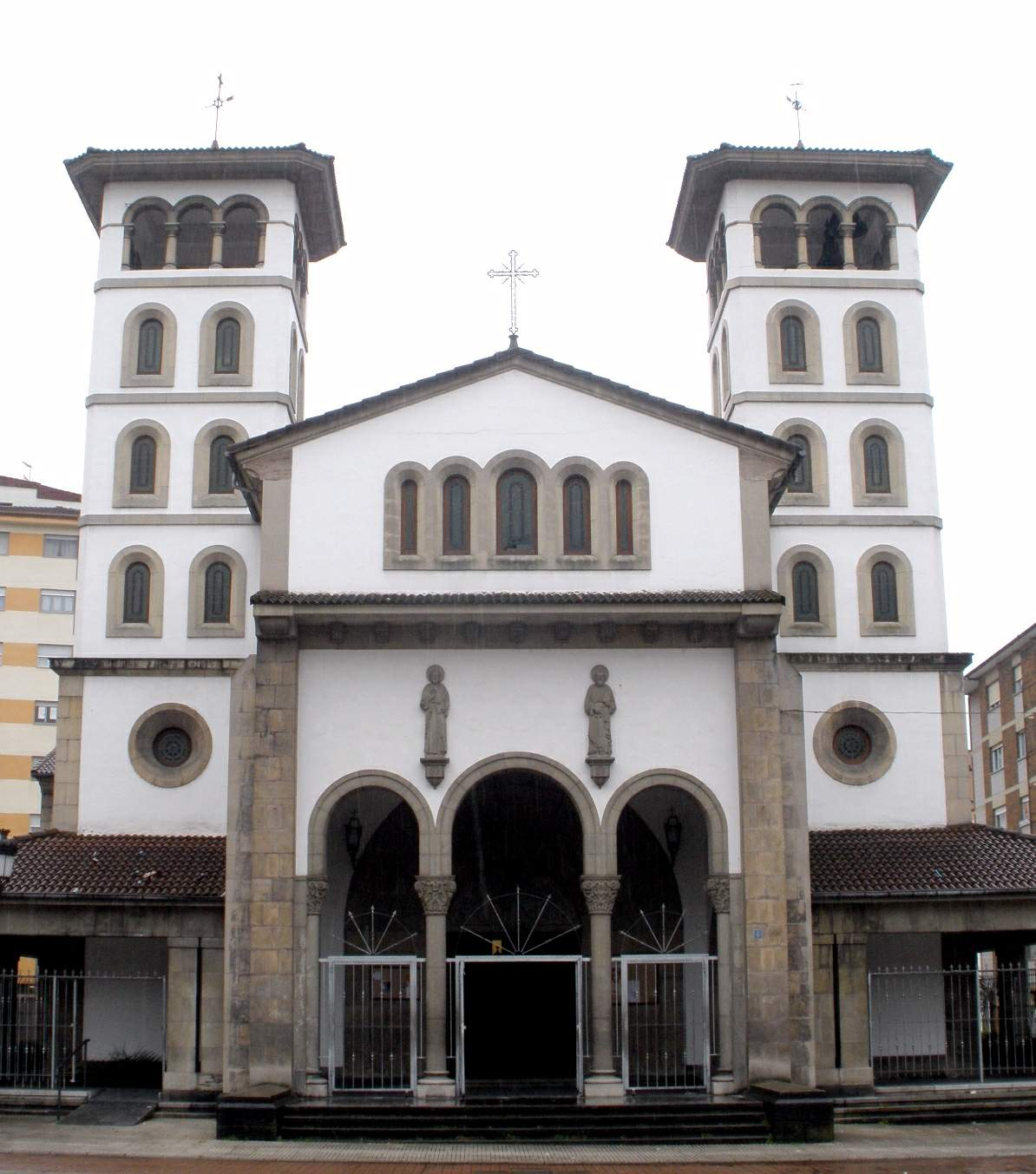
Iglesia de San Andrés

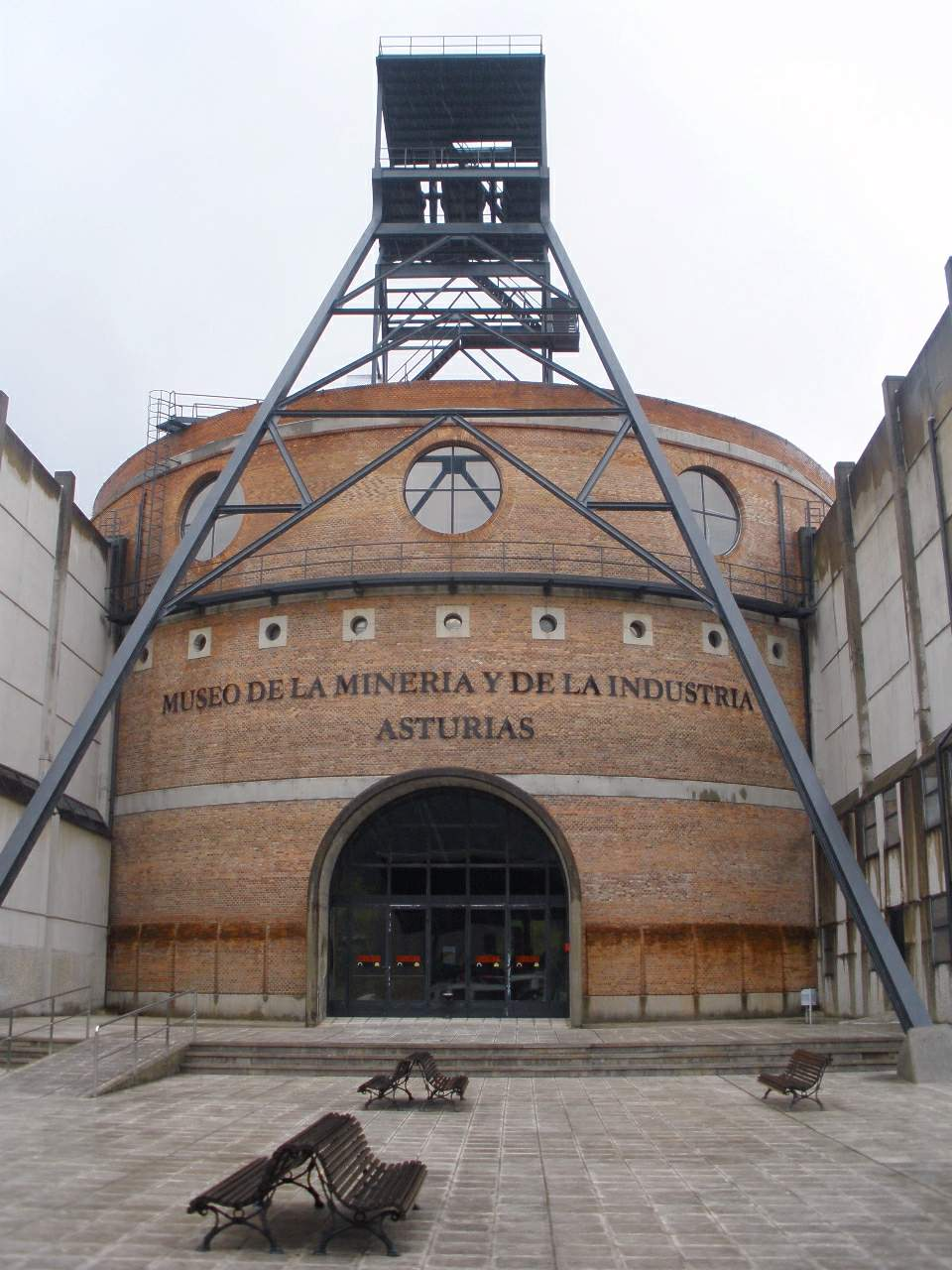
Mining Museum of Asturias

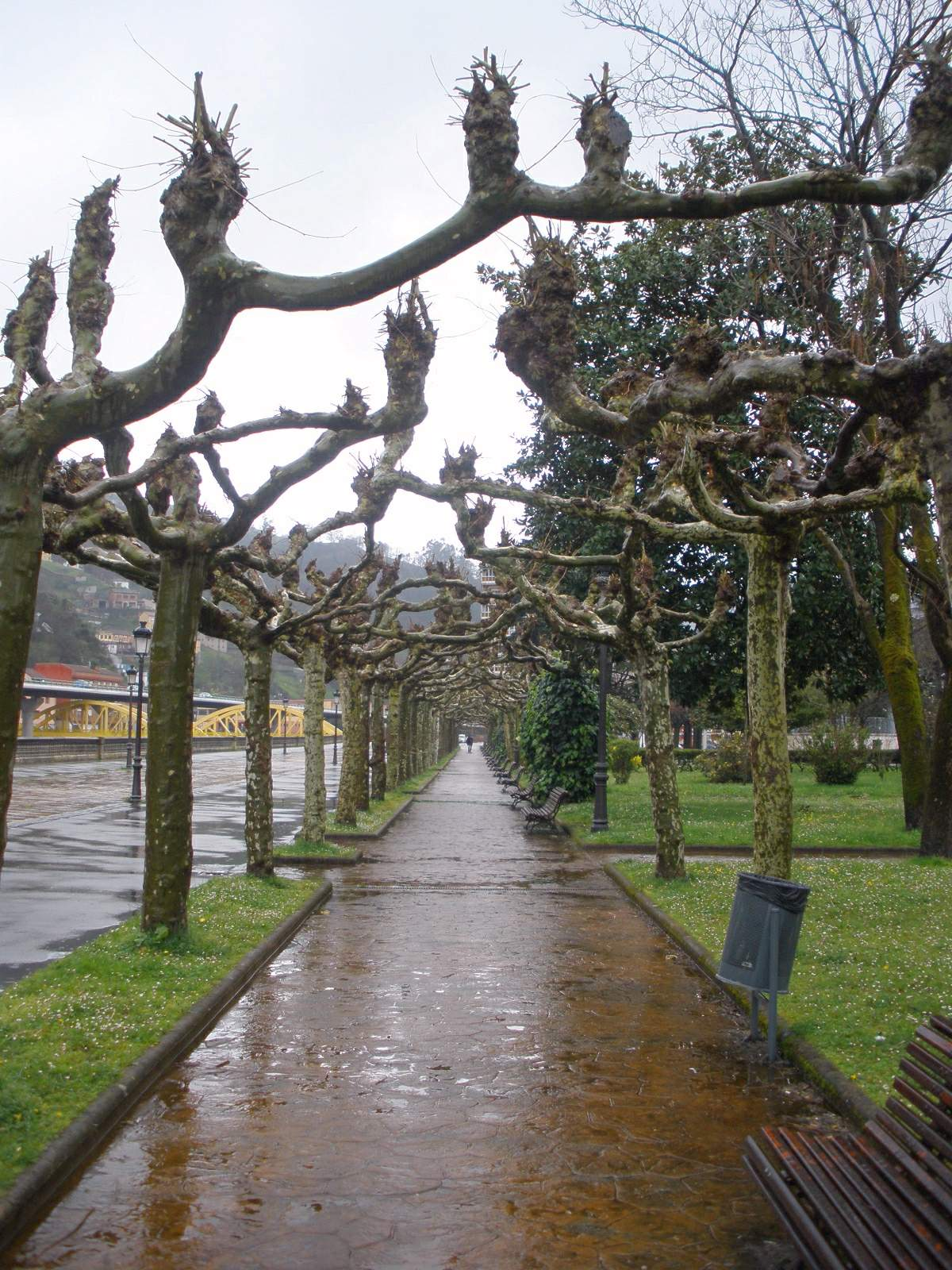
Parque de La Laguna

== Bibliography ==
- Javier Rodríguez Muñoz; Severino Antuña González. "Entrego, El/L´Entregu", En Editorial Prensa Asturiana, S.A.. Diccionario Geográfico de Asturias. Ciudades, Villas y Pueblos. Oviedo. pp. 372-374. Depósito legal V-4734-1998. (in Spanish)
- Consejería de Cultura, Comunicación Social y Turismo (7 de febrero de 2007). "Decreto 3/2008, de 23 de enero, por el que se determinan los topónimos oficiales del Concejo de San Martín del Rey Aurelio". Boletín Oficial del Principado de Asturias (Imprenta Regional) (31): pp. 2347-2353. Consultado el 20 de julio de 2010.
- Sociedad Asturiana de Estudios Económicos e Industriales. "Nomenclátor de entidades de población de Asturias 2008". Consultado el 20 de julio de 2010.
