= Parres =

- Municipality
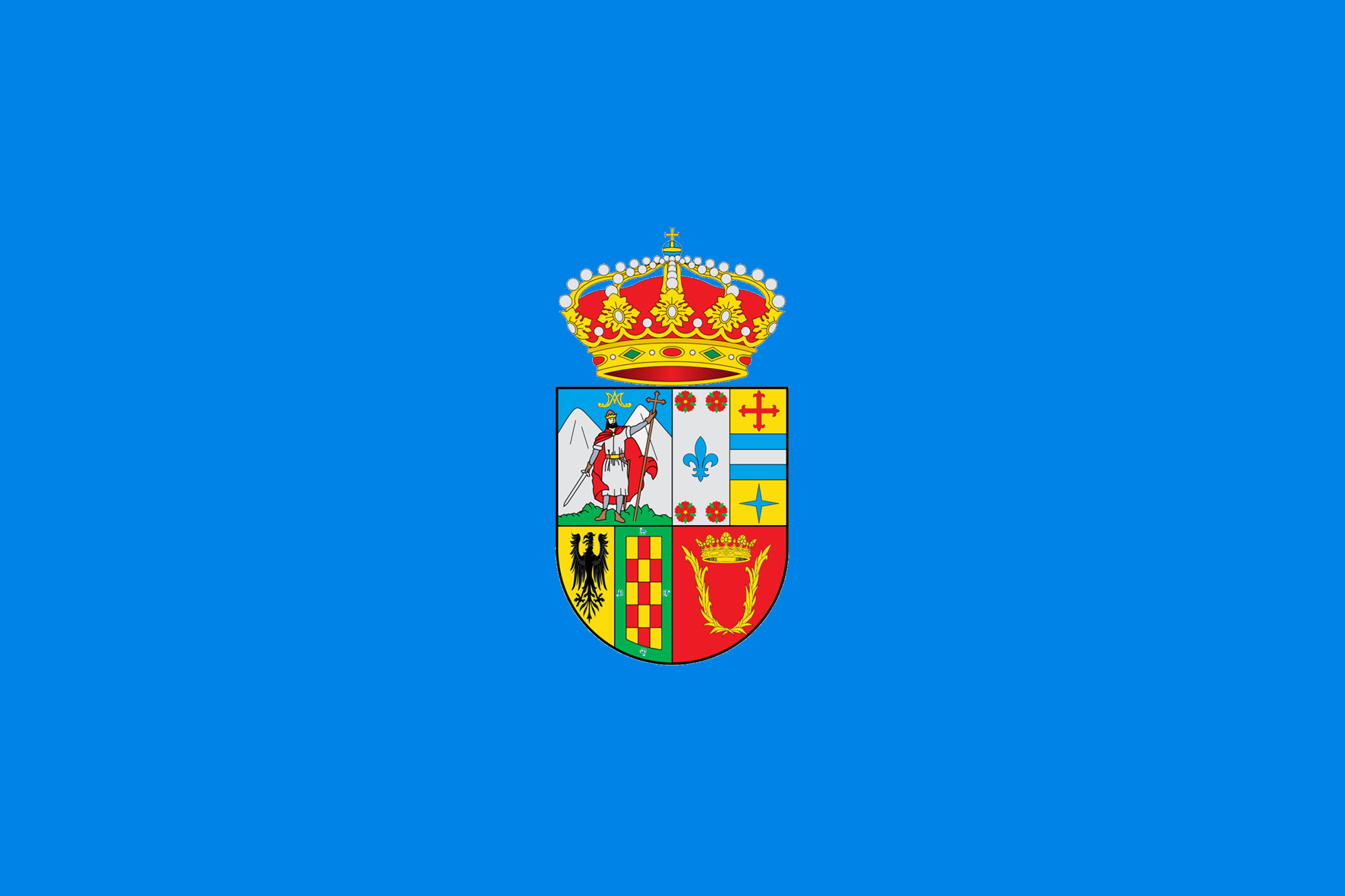
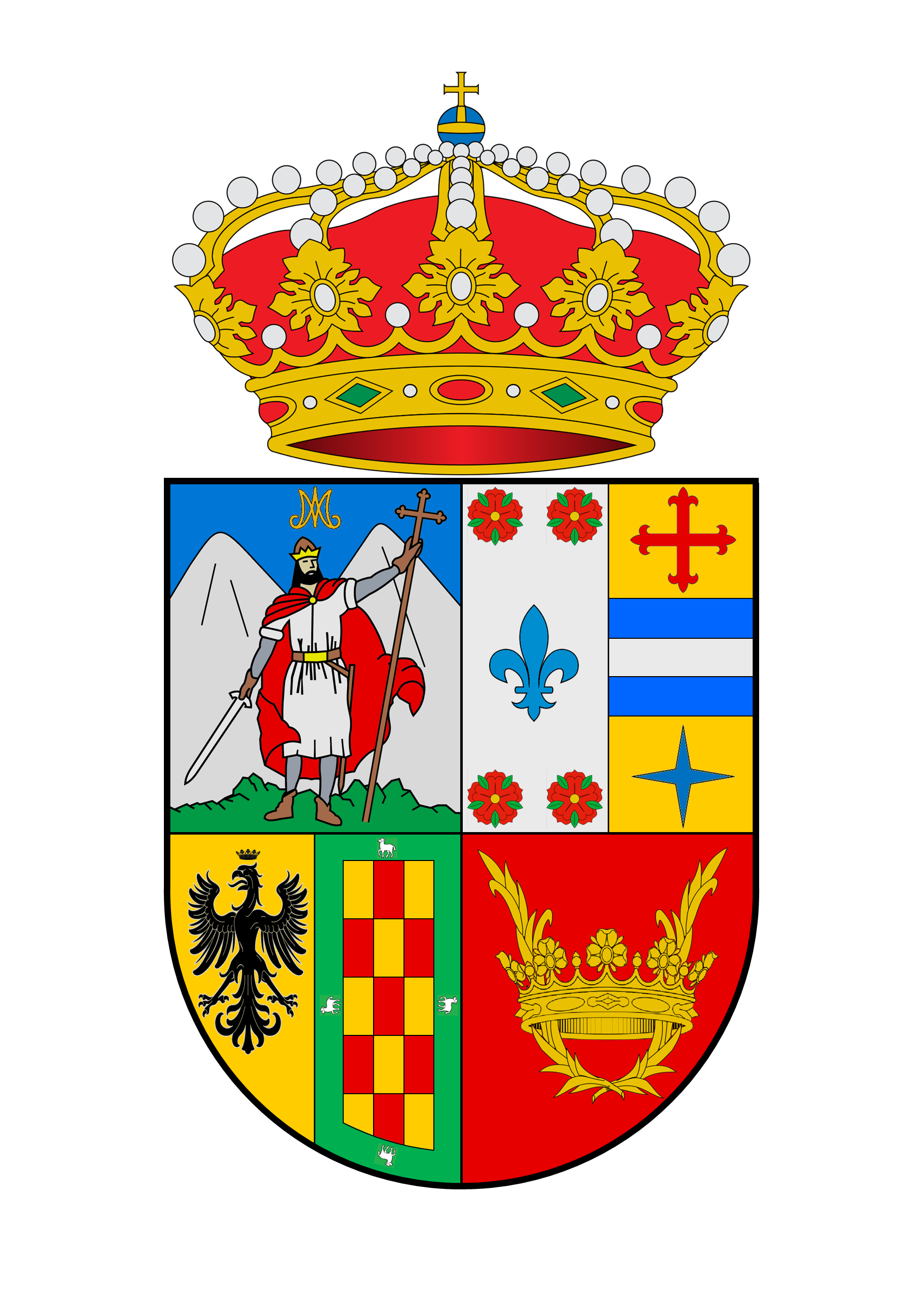
- Flag Coat of arms

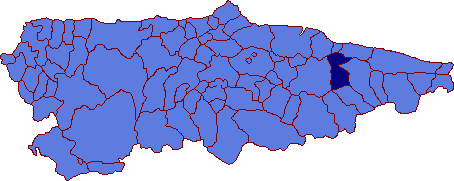

- Location in Spain
- Coordinates: 43°22′12″N 5°11′24″W
- Country: Spain
- Autonomous community: Asturias
- Province: Asturias
- Comarca: Oriente
- Judicial district: Cangas de Onís
- Capital: Arriondas

Government
  - Alcalde: Manuel Millán García González (PSOE)

Area
  - Total: 126.08 km^{2} (48.68 sq mi)
- Highest elevation: 1,159 m (3,802 ft)

Population (2025-01-01)
  - Total: 5,150
  - Density: 40.8/km^{2} (106/sq mi)
- Demonym: parragués/a
- Time zone: UTC+1 (CET)
  - Summer (DST): UTC+2 (CEST)
- Postal code: 33540
- Website: Official website

Parres is a municipality in the Autonomous Community of the Principality of Asturias, Spain. It is bordered on the north by Caravia and Ribadesella, on the east by Cangas de Onís, on the west by Piloña and Colunga, and on the south by Amieva.

The municipality's capital is the village of Arriondas, which sits on the banks of both the rivers Piloña and Sella. The municipality consists of two main valleys (of the rivers Sella and Piloña) that stretch around the north. The rest consists of mountains from the Cantabrian Mountains and, to the north west, the Sierra del Sueve.

== Parishes ==
- Bode
- Bodes
- Castiello
- Cayarga
- Cofiño
- Collía
- Cuadroveña
- Fíos
- Huera de Dego
- Llerandi
- Margolles
- Montes de Sebares
- Nevares
- Pendás
- San Juan de Parres
- Sorribas (Parres)
- Viabaño
- Villanueva

The capital of the municipality is the village of Arriondas, located in the parish of Cuadroveña.
