= Fruela I of Asturias =

King of Asturias from 757 to 768

Fruela I
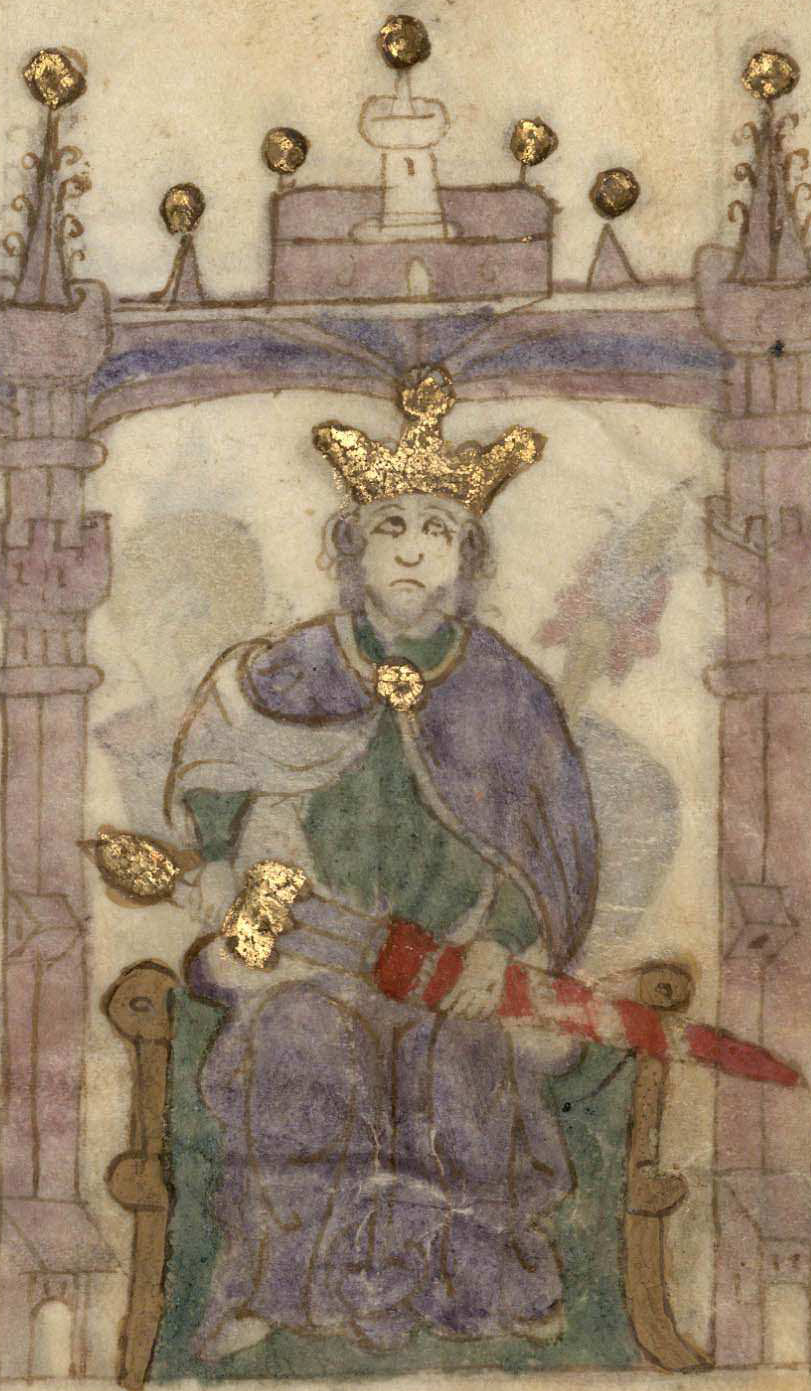
- Depiction in the Castilian manuscript Compendium of Chronicles of Kings, c. 1312–1325

King of Asturias
- Reign: 757–768
- Coronation: 757
- Predecessor: Alfonso I
- Successor: Aurelius
- Born: c. 722; Asturias
- Died: 14 January 768; Cangas de Onís, Asturias
- Burial: Oviedo, Asturias
- Consort: Munia of Álava
- Issue: Alfonso II of Asturias
- Dynasty: Astur-Leonese dynasty
- Father: Alfonso I of Asturias
- Mother: Ermesinda

Fruela I (c. 722 – 14 January 768), (Note: Also referred to as Froila I and nicknamed "the Cruel") was the King of Asturias from 757 until his assassination. He was the eldest son of Alfonso I and continued his father's war against the Moors. Pelayo, the founder of the Kingdom of Asturias, was his maternal grandfather.

== History ==
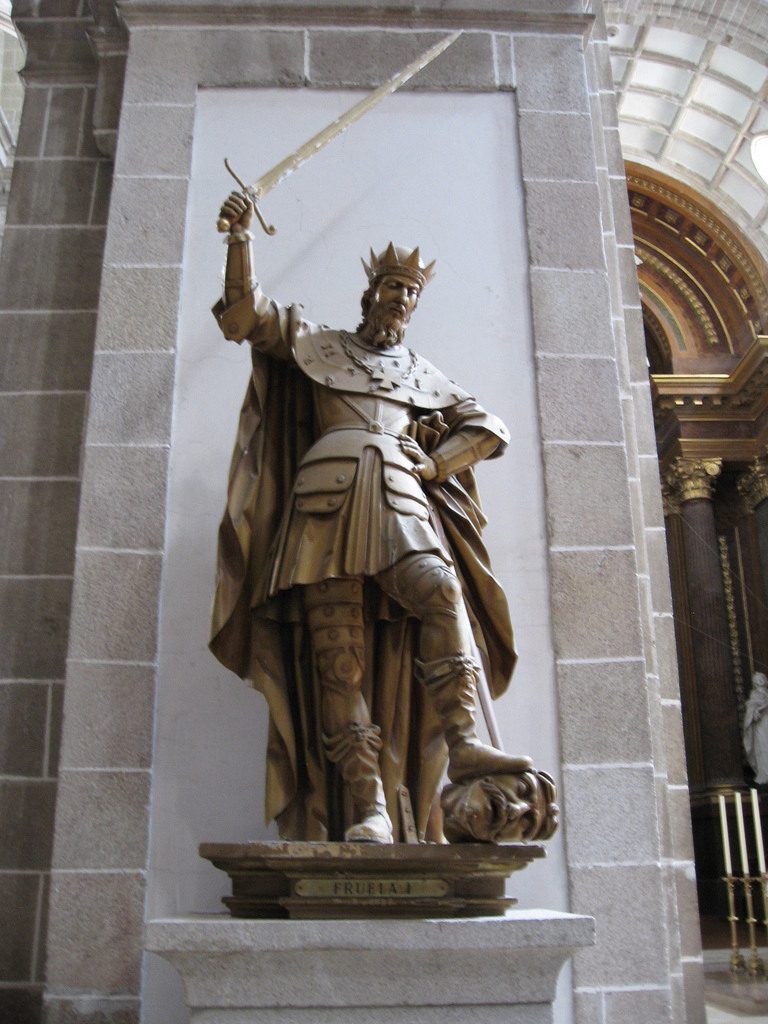
Statue of Fruela I in the monastery of St. Julian in Samos, Galicia

During his reign, he suppressed uprisings from both the Basques and the Galicians; following his victory over the Basques, he took a Basque noblewoman from Alava named Munia as his wife. Basque country was relatively untouched following the revolt; on the contrary, Fruela laid waste to Galicia after suppressing the uprising. He also defeated a Cordoban army led by Omar, son of Abd al-Rahman I; Omar was killed as a result of the battle. The city of Oviedo was also founded during his reign when the abbot Máximo and his uncle Fromestano erected a church in honor of Saint Vincent there in 761.

Fruela personally assassinated his brother, Vimarano, leading to him being nicknamed "the Cruel." He had feared that Vimarano's popularity would lead to him taking the throne; in an act of repentance, he adopted Vimarano's son, Vermudo, as his own. The killing of Vimarano outraged the nobility, however, and he in turn was assassinated by his own men in Cangas de Onís. He was succeeded by his cousin, Aurelius; his son, Alfonso, would later become King of Asturias. He and his wife Munia are buried together in the cathedral of Oviedo.

== Sources ==
- Collins, Roger (2014). Caliphs and Kings Spain, 796-1031. Wiley. ISBN 9781118730010.

Preceded by Alfonso I	King of Asturias; 757–768	Succeeded by Aurelius
