= San Andrés de Llinares =

Parish (parroquia) in Samartín del Rei Aurelio, Asturias, Spain

Coordinates: 43.216667°N 5.733333°W

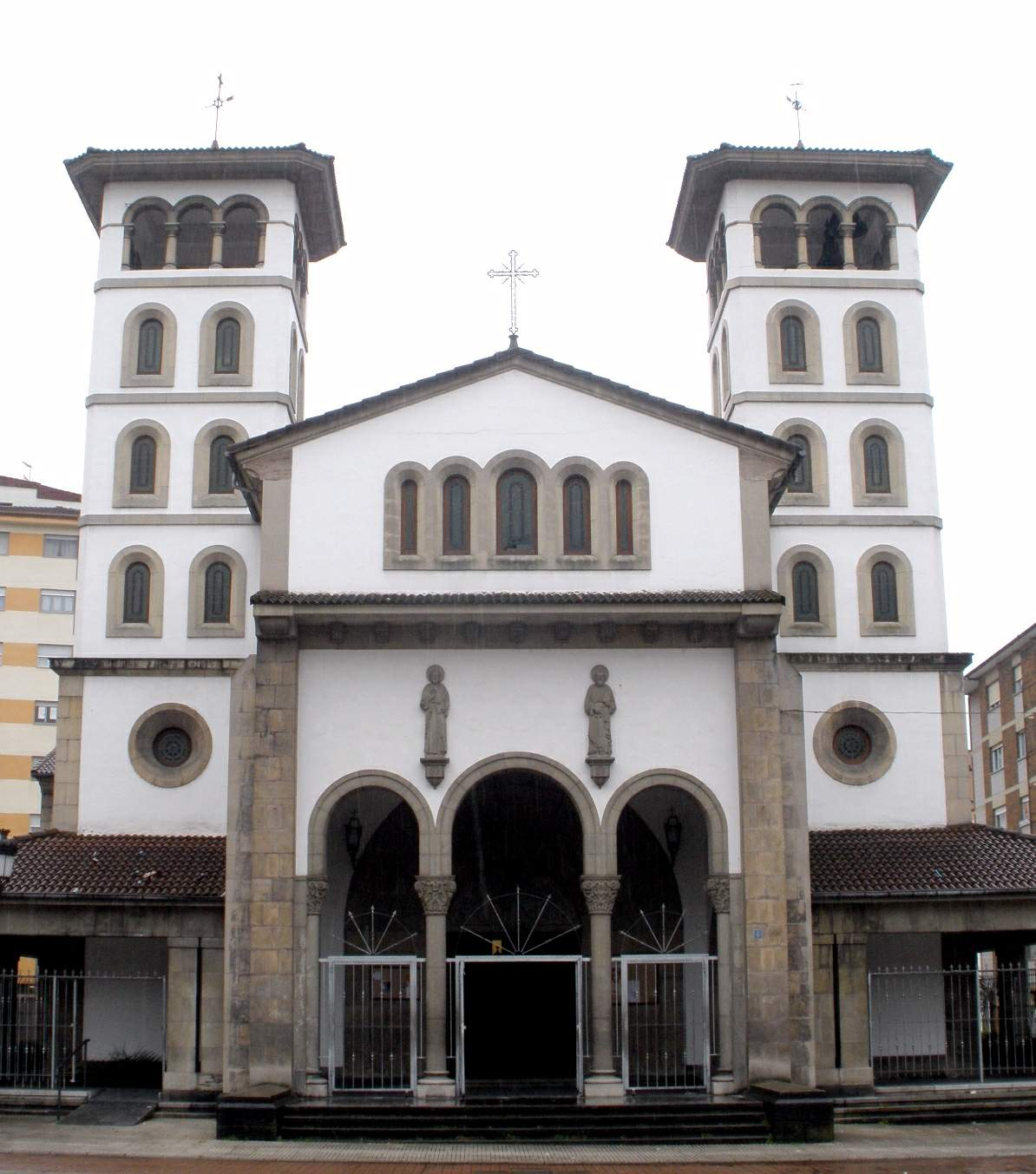
Iglesia de San Andres in El Entrego, Linares

San Andrés de Llinares (Spanish: Linares) is one of five parishes (administrative divisions) in San Martín del Rey Aurelio, a municipality within the province and autonomous community of Asturias, in northern Spain.

It is 10.68 km^{2} (4.12 sq mi) in size, with a population of 9,273 (INE 2005).

== Villages and hamlets ==
- Arbixil
- Artosa
- Barreo
- Bédavo
- Carrocera
- Castañera
- Ciñera
- Cotariella
- El Candanal
- El Colláu
- El Felguerón
- El Jardín
- El Llanu Martín
- El Llugarín de Baxo
- El Llugarín de Riba
- El Mayáu Solis
- El Rebollal
- El Sotón
- El Trabanquín
- El Valle Bédavo
- Escobiu
- Fresnu
- Gollano
- L'Abonión
- L'Acebal
- L'Entregu
- L'Otariellu
- La Bilortera
- La Bornaína
- La Cabaña
- La Cabañina
- La Campa l'Abeduriu
- La Cantera
- La Cascaya
- La Caseta
- La Casona
- La Central
- La Corca
- La Fayona
- La Figar
- La Granxa
- La Llaniella
- La Llave
- La Lloseta
- La Nespral
- La Nual
- La Pontona
- La Rebollá
- La Revenga
- La Rotella
- La Teyerina
- La Traviesa
- La Vallina
- La Venta l'Aire
- La Viña
- La Xuliana
- Les Roces
- Llagos
- Llaneces
- Llantero
- Los Carbazales
- Los Cigüeñales
- Los Corrales
- Los Fornos
- Los Rebollos
- Meruxeo
- Paniceres
- Pelunegru
- Perlá
- Pipe
- Polaúra
- Pumarabín
- Pumarín
- Rozá
- San Vicente
- Sorriego
- Tariz
- Valles
- Valleya
- Villacedré
- Vistalegre

=== Minor entities ===
- El Barriru
- El Bosquín
- El Cabañucu
- El Cantu
- El Cantuspín
- El Carbayal
- El Coto
- El Fielato
- El Llapusu
- El Norte
- El Picu la Xerra
- El Picu los Xerros
- El Rebollalín
- El Rebollalón
- El Ribayu
- El Rincón
- El Tramón
- Fradera
- La Barriosa
- La Borná
- La Escura
- La Fayuca
- La Llosa Cullá
- La Mina'l Río
- La Vega
- Les Cabañes
- Les Cruces
- Les Llamargues
- Les Vareres
- Los Bornaones
- Santana
