= San Martín del Rey Aurelio =

San Martín del Rey Aurelio Samartín del Rei Aurelio (Asturian)
- Municipality
- Coat of arms

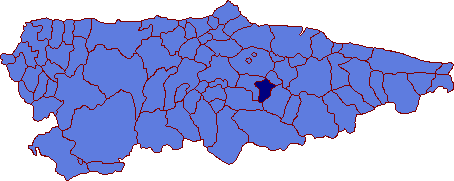

- Location in Spain
- Coordinates: 43°16′29″N 5°36′26″W
- Country: Spain
- Autonomous community: Asturias
- Province: Asturias
- Comarca: Nalón
- Capital: Sotrondio

Government
  - Alcalde: Enrique Fernandez Rodriguez (PSOE)

Area
  - Total: 56.13 km^{2} (21.67 sq mi)
- Highest elevation: 1,096 m (3,596 ft)

Population (2025-01-01)
  - Total: 15,531
  - Density: 276.7/km^{2} (716.6/sq mi)
- Time zone: UTC+1 (CET)
  - Summer (DST): UTC+2 (CEST)
- Postal code: 33950

San Martín del Rey Aurelio (Asturian: Samartín del Rei Aurelio) is a municipality of the Autonomous Community of the Principality of Asturias in northern Spain.

There are three main towns in the municipality: Sotrondio, El Entrego, and Blimea, and many villages, such as Santa Bárbara and La Hueria.

== Location and features ==
It is situated in the central part of Asturias, just below the Sierra de San Mamés, part of the Cantabrian Mountains. The Nalón River, the longest river in Asturias, crosses the municipality. The Redes Natural Park is located nearby.

Historically a mining location, nowadays it is in a re-industrial process with the emigration of many young people (about 30% of under 30). New computer based factories are attempting to establish themselves.

== Parishes ==
There are five parroquias:

- Blimea
- Cocañín
- Linares
- Rey Aurelio
- Santa Bárbara

== Politics ==
The current mayor is Enrique Fernández Rodríguez (FSA-PSOE).

Local elections
Party/List	1979	1983	1987	1991	1995	1999	2003	2007	2011	2015
PSOE	11	13	9	11	11	12	11	9	7	7
PCE / IU-BA	7	5	6	6	4	4	4	3	4	5
Somos										3
CD / AP / PP		3	2	3	6	4	6	5	5	2
FAC									1	0
UCD / CDS	3		4	1						
URAS / URAS-PAS						1	0	0		
Total	21	21	21	21	21	21	21	17	17	17

== Gallery ==
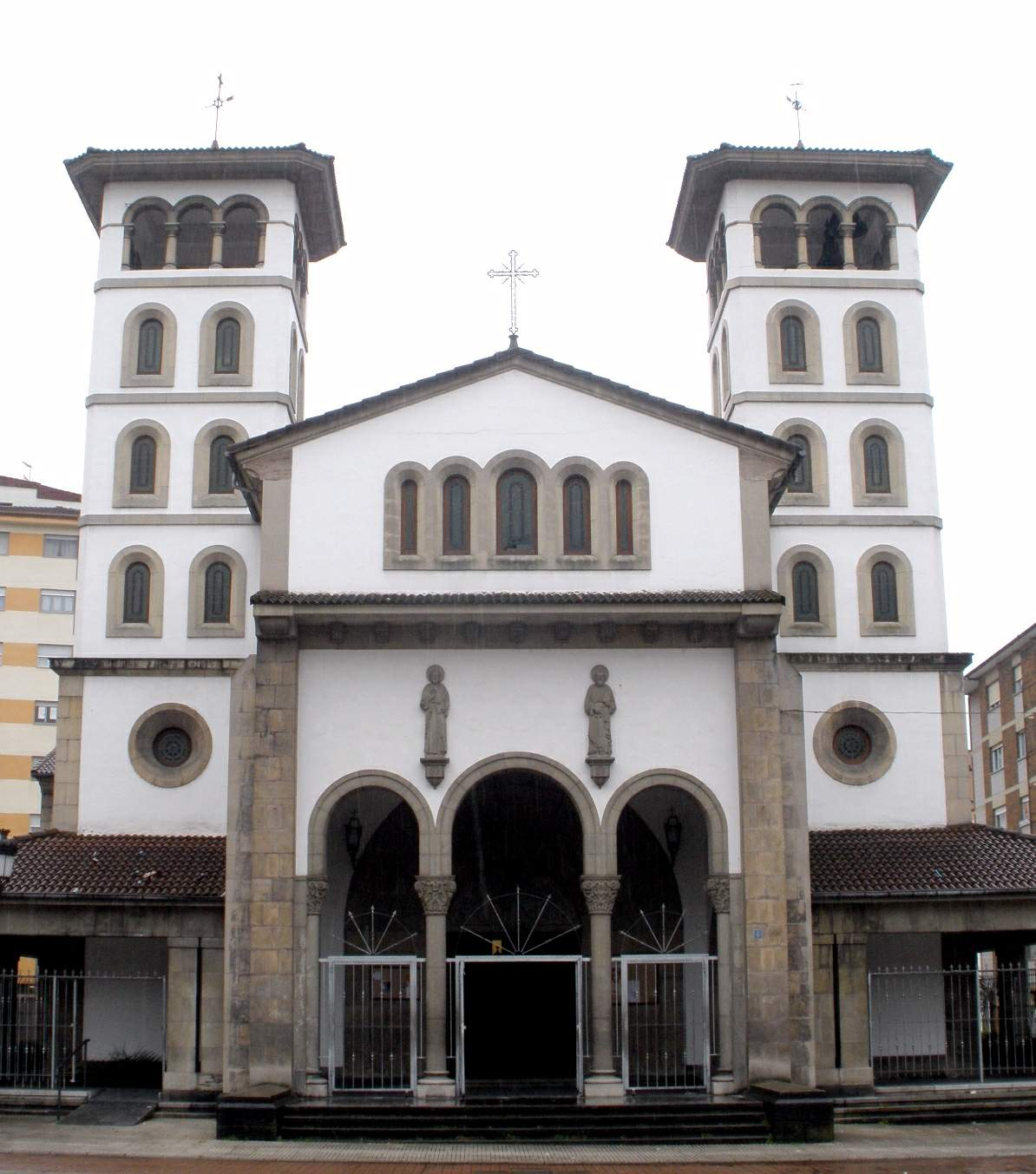
Iglesia de San Andrés in El Entrego, Linares

== See also ==
- List of municipalities in Asturias
