= Nalón (river) =

Longest river in Asturias, Spain

Coordinates: 43.5674°N 6.07748°W

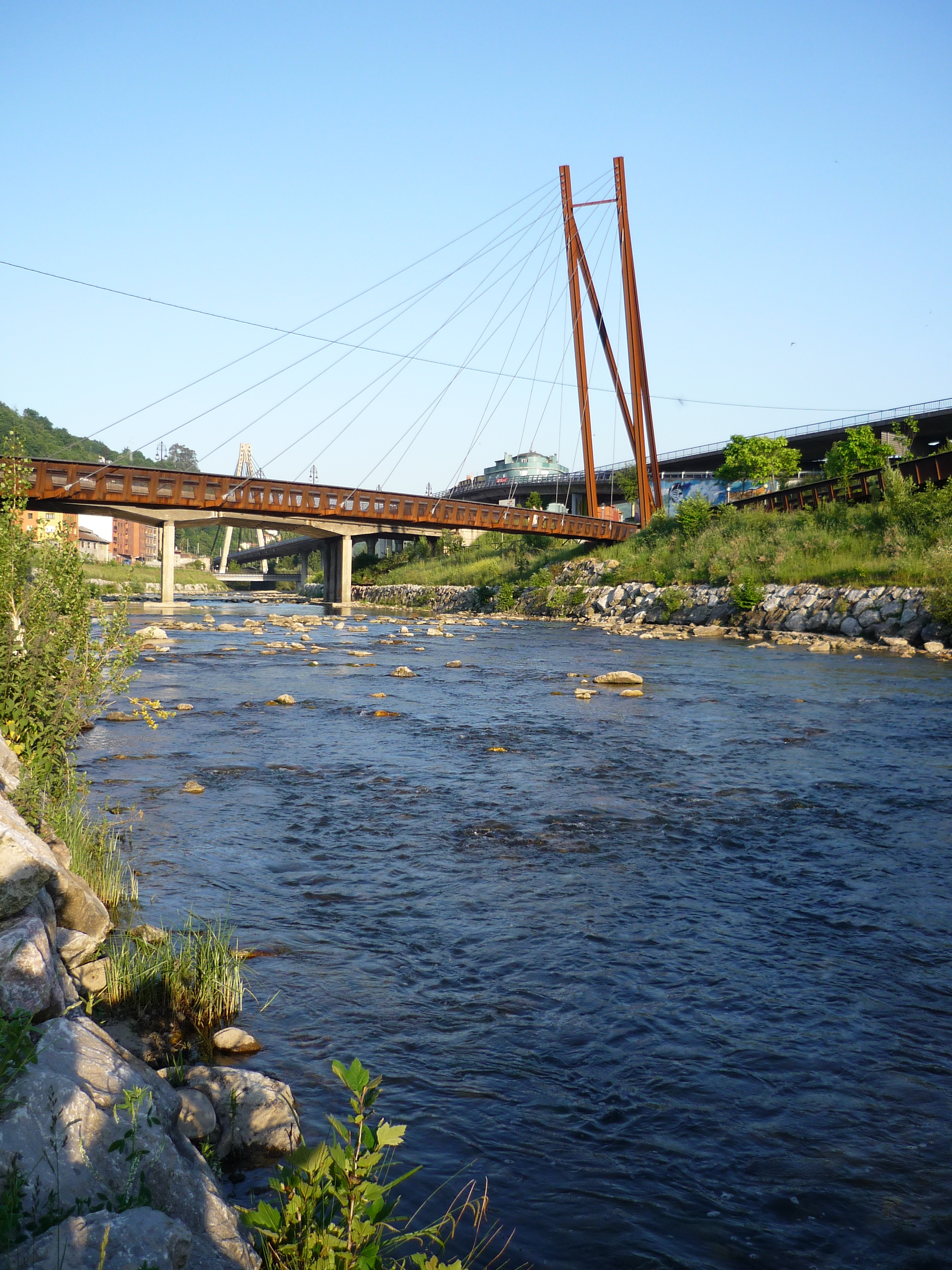
- The Nalón in La Felguera

Location
- Country: Spain
- Region: Asturias

Physical characteristics
- Source: Fuente la Nalona
- Length: 140.8 km (87.5 mi)

Basin features
- Tributaries
  - left: Narcea, Cubia, Trubia, Nora, Caudal, Arranguín

The Nalón is a river in the autonomous community of Asturias, Spain. It is the longest river in Asturias, measuring 140.8 km (87.5 mi). It begins near Puerto de Tarna in Caso and flows into the Cantabrian Sea just north of San Juan de la Arena. Its many tributaries include the Narcea, which is itself the second largest river in Asturias, and the Cubia.

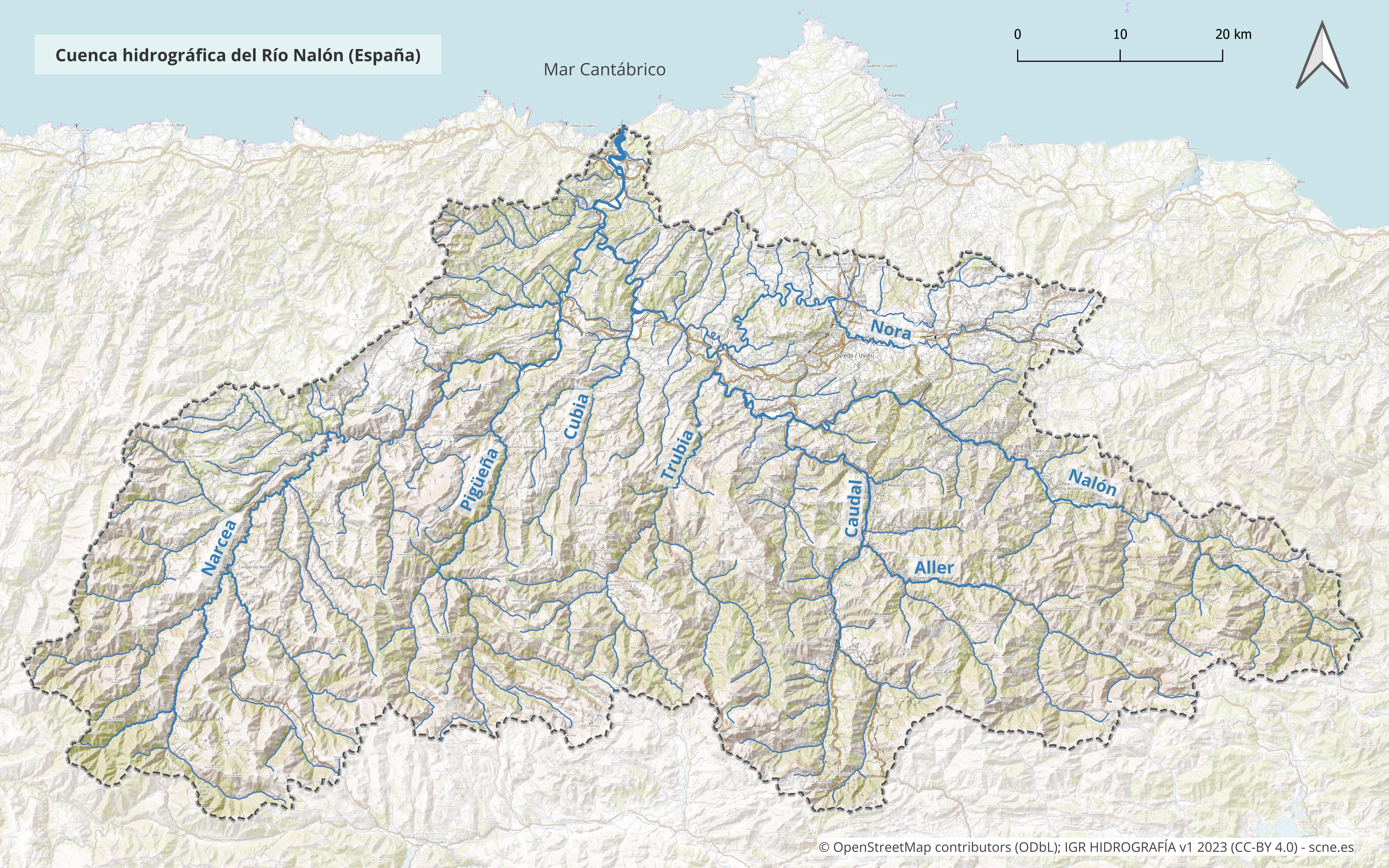
Nalón river drainage basin

The river is home to multiple endangered species, including the Iberian desman and the Cantabrian brown bear. Strabo made the first known historical reference to the river, calling it "Melsos." Ptolemy later referred to the river as the "Naelus" or "Nailos." This, in turn, would later morph into "Nilonis" and "Nalonis" in documents from the medieval Kingdom of Asturias, leading to its current denomination.
