= Ordoño I of Asturias =

King of Asturias from 850 to 866

Ordoño I
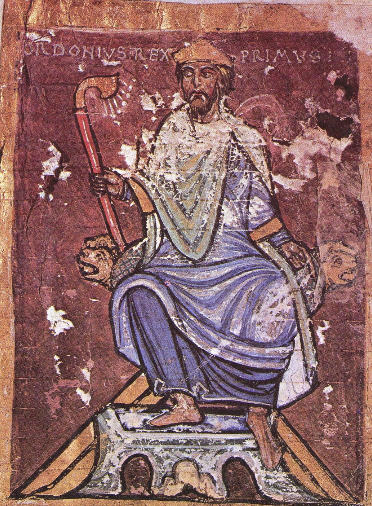
- Miniature from Tumbo A manuscript, c. 1129–1255

King of Asturias
- Reign: 850–866
- Predecessor: Ramiro I
- Successor: Alfonso III
- Born: c. 821; Oviedo
- Died: 27 May 866; Oviedo
- Burial: Cathedral of San Salvador, Oviedo
- Consort: Nuña or Munia
- Issue: Alfonso III of Asturias
- Dynasty: Astur-Leonese dynasty
- Father: Ramiro I of Asturias
- Religion: Chalcedonian Christianity

Ordoño I (c. 821 – 27 May 866) was King of Asturias from 850 until his death. He was born in Oviedo, where he spent his early life in the court of Alfonso II. He was probably raised in Lugo, capital of the province of Galicia, where his father, Ramiro I, had been named governor. He received his education and military training there.

Ordoño was named governor of Galicia when his father went to Bardulia to marry his second wife, Paterna. While Ramiro was away, Alfonso II died, and the nobles elected Count Nepocian as king. Ordoño immediately began to raise an army to assist his father, in claiming the throne. He could not leave his post in Galicia to help, however, and his army went unused. When his father finally prevailed, he confirmed Ordoño in his heretofore provisional position. After his father's death in 850, Ordoño succeeded his father as king, becoming the first king of Asturias to ascend the throne without election. His first confrontation was with the Basques, who rebelled with the support of the Banu Qasi of Zaragoza. While returning to Oviedo after defeating the rebels, he received news of an impending Moorish assault on Bardulia. Before the Moors could attack, he met them near the Ebro and defeated them.

Ordoño later went to war against Musa ibn Musa, a Muslim Goth who had been consolidating his power and controlled Zaragoza, Albelda, Tudela, Huesca, and Toledo. According to the Chronicle of Alfonso III, Musa had placed his army at Monte Laturce, outside of Albelda, which he had recently fortified. Ordoño split his own army into two, with one half to siege Albelda and the other to combat Musa's forces. The result of the ensuing battle was a massacre; it was claimed that Musa's brother-in-law Garcia and over 10,000 of Musa's cavalrymen were killed, and Musa fled after nearly being killed himself. Musa's son, referred to as Lupo, supposedly subjugated himself to Ordoño upon learning of the result of the battle; he remained Ordoño's vassal for the rest of his life and fought alongside him against other Moors. Separately, he also defeated and imprisoned Moneror (also called Mazaros), king of Talamanca, as well as Zeth, king of Coria. He sacked both villages and took their inhabitants as slaves.

Ordoño additionally led the repopulation of the cities of Tui, Astorga, León, and Amaya, which had been left deserted after being conquered by Alfonso II. He died in Oviedo in 866 after suffering from gout, and was buried in the Cathedral of San Salvador. He was described as a beloved king. He was succeeded by his son, Alfonso III, who would eventually be referred to as the first "Emperor of Spain."

Ordoño I of Asturias Astur-Leonese dynasty Born: circa 821 Died: 27 May 866
Regnal titles
Preceded by Ramiro I	King of Asturias; 850–866	Succeeded by Alfonso III
