= Ramiro I of Asturias =

King of Asturias (rgn: 842 - 850)

Ramiro I
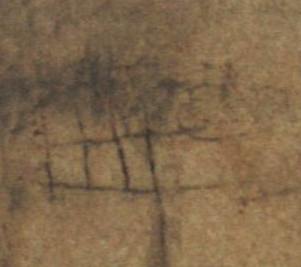
- Ramiro's mark on the Celeiro, an 8th-century document confirmed by several subsequent kings

King of Asturias
- Reign: 842–850
- Predecessor: Nepotian
- Successor: Ordoño I
- Born: c. 790; Oviedo
- Died: 1 February 850 (aged 59–60); Oviedo
- Burial: Cathedral of San Salvador, Oviedo
- Spouse: Paterna
- Issue: Ordoño I
- Dynasty: Astur-Leonese dynasty
- Father: Bermudo I of Asturias
- Religion: Chalcedonian Christianity

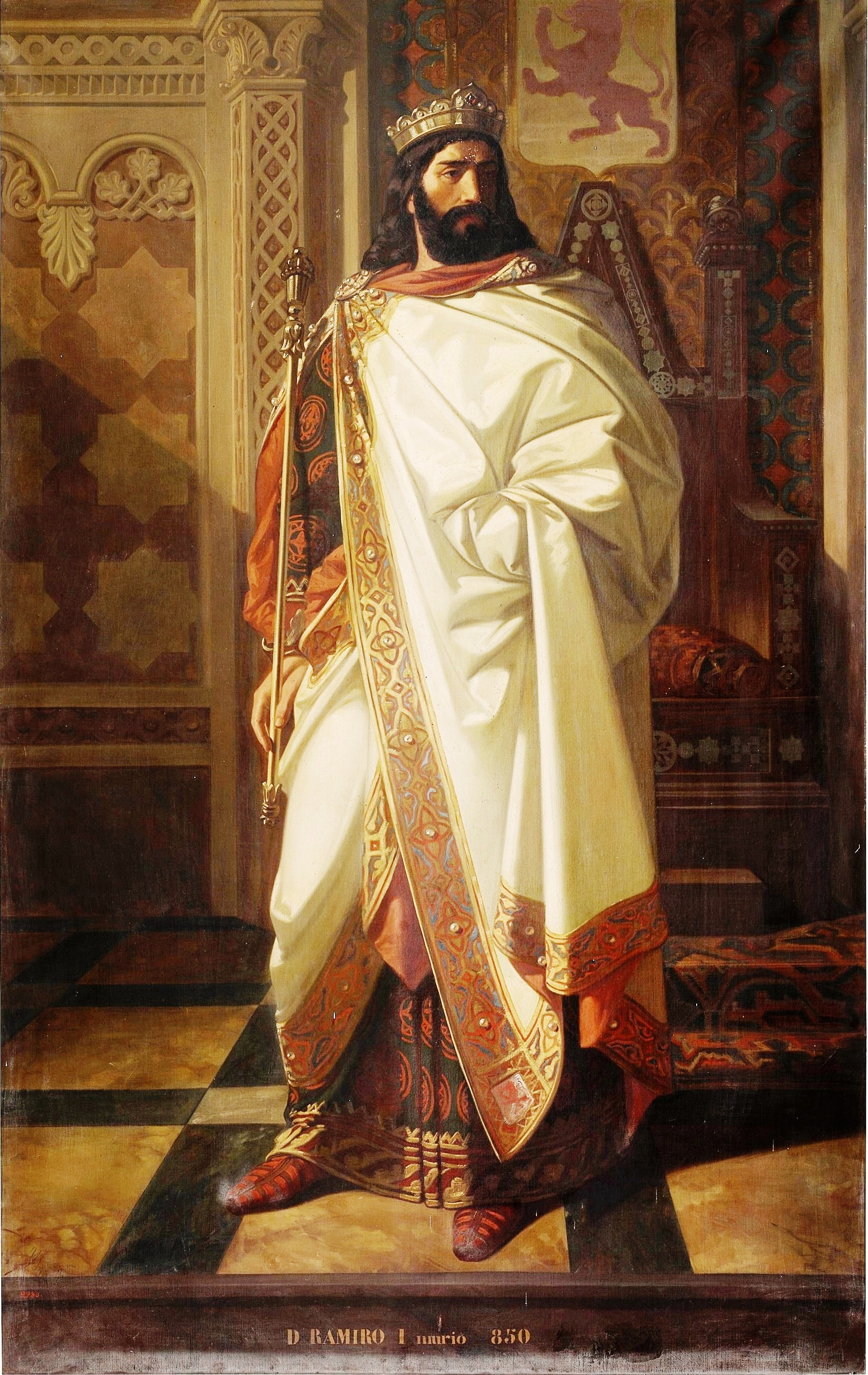
19th-century imaginary portrait by Isidoro Lozano

Ramiro I (c. 790 – 1 February 850) was king of Asturias from 842 until his death in 850. Son of King Bermudo I, he became king following a succession struggle after his predecessor, Alfonso II, died without children. During his turbulent reign, he fended off attacks from both Vikings and the forces of al-Andalus. Architecturally, his recreational palace Santa María del Naranco and other buildings used the ramirense style that prefigured Romanesque architecture. He was a contemporary of Abd ar-Rahman II, Umayyad Emir of Córdoba.

== Reign ==
=== Gaining the throne ===
Royal flag of Ramiro I

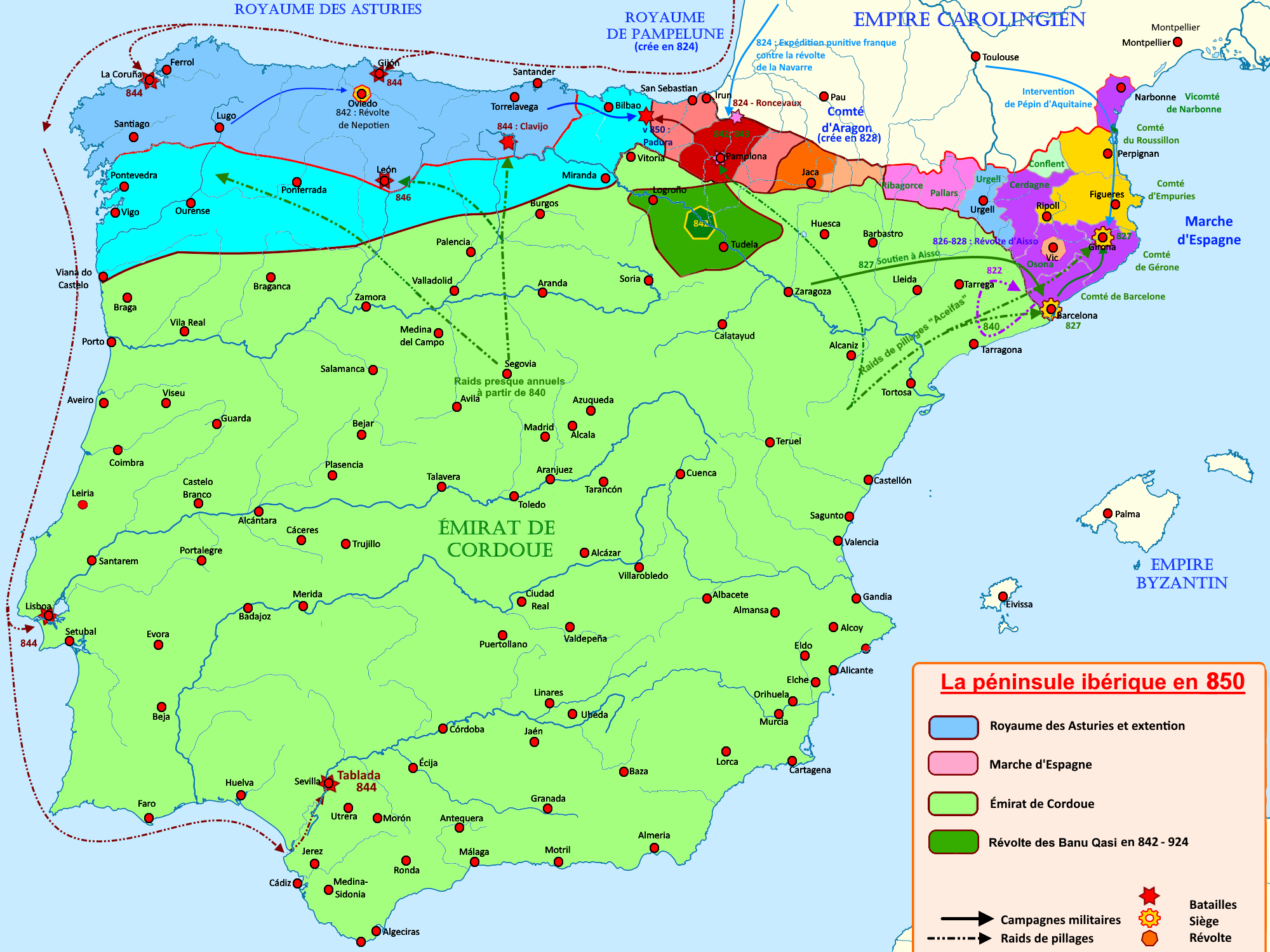
Iberia in AD 850, with Asturias in blue.

The death of King Alfonso II brought about a succession crisis in the Kingdom of Asturias. According to the Chronicle of Alfonso III, credited to Ramiro's grandson, the childless Alfonso II chose as his successor Ramiro, his distant kinsman and son of Alfonso's predecessor Bermudo I. At the time of King Alfonso's death, Ramiro was outside of Asturias in Castile (or Bardulia according to the Chronicle of Alfonso III), where he was attending his own marriage ceremonies.

Nepocian, comes palatii and the late king's kinsman, challenged Ramiro's succession in his absence, being supported by Astures and Vascones who had been loyal to Alfonso II. Ramiro sought support in Galicia, where he formed an army and advanced toward Oviedo. Nepotian awaited Ramiro's advance at Cornellana, by the river Narcea where Ramiro defeated him in the Battle of the Bridge of Cornellana. Nepotian fled, but was pursued and captured by Counts Scipion and Sonna. After his capture, Nepotian was blinded and interned in a monastery.

=== Fending off Vikings ===
By the time of Ramiro's reign, Vikings were frequenting the waters of Europe's coastal regions. In 844, a fleet disembarked at Corunna and began to raid the countryside, burning and pillaging. Ramiro marched against them with an army of considerable strength and managed to rout the invaders. He took some of them as prisoners and burned a large part of their fleet. Ramiro's reception dissuaded the Vikings such that they no longer raided the coastlines of Asturias.

=== The legend of the Battle of Clavijo ===
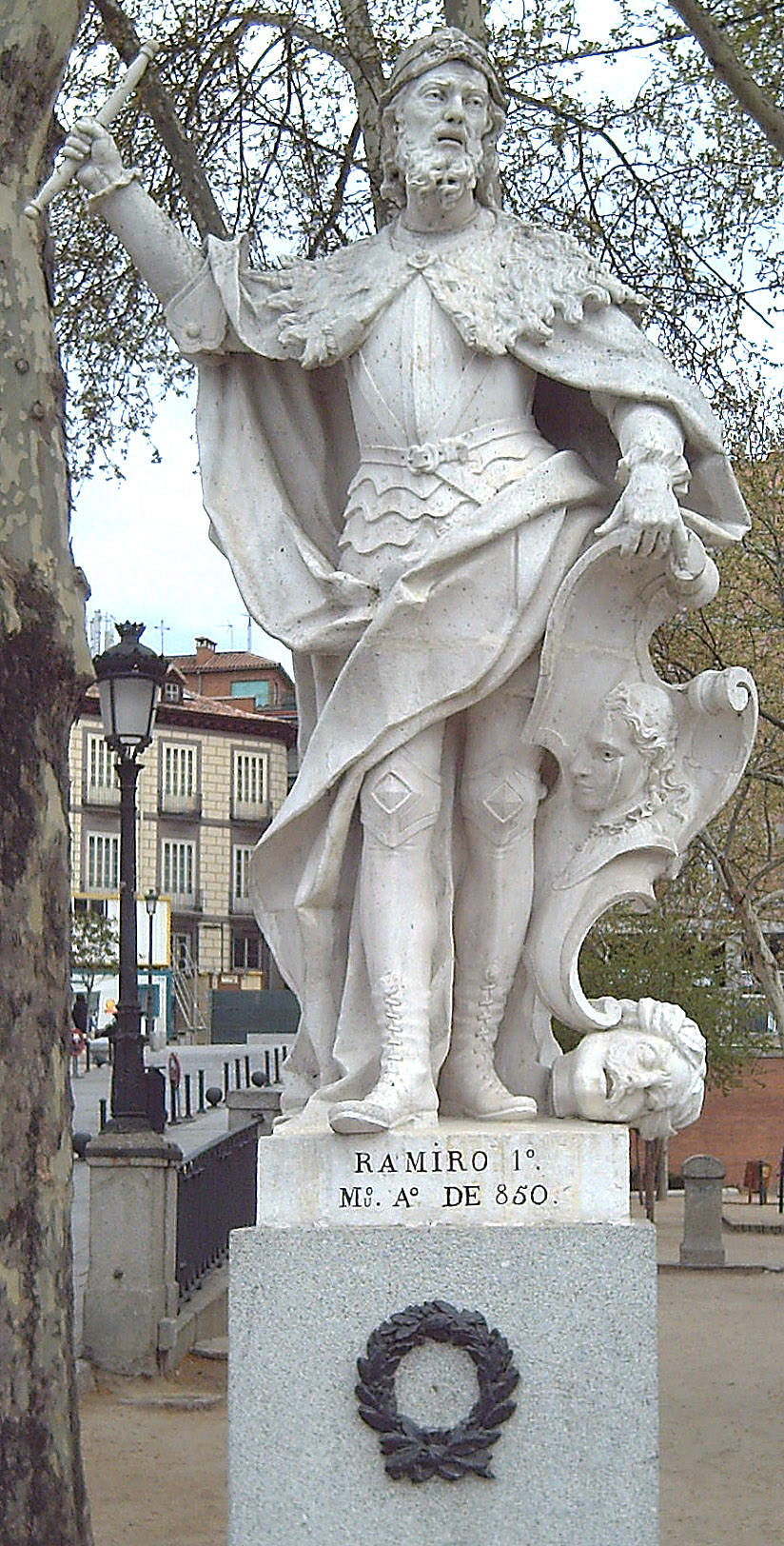
An 18th-century statue in the Royal Palace of Madrid depicting the artist's concept of Ramiro I

According to legend, in 834, Ramiro defeated the Moors in the Battle of Clavijo. The date was later changed to 844 in order to accommodate the contradictions inherent to the story (Ramiro was not ruling in 834). The account of the battle came to the spotlight on a spurious charter forged in Santiago de Compostela in the early 12th century. Neither Asturian nor Arab chronicles of the period make any mention of such a battle. It is first mentioned in the chronicles of Rodrigo Jiménez de Rada, 13th-century archbishop of Toledo.

The account of the battle appears to be a mythification of the historical 859 Second Battle of Albelda, in which Ramiro's son and successor, Ordoño I along with García Íñiguez of Pamplona crushed the forces of Musa ibn Musa al-Qasawi. According to the legend, during the battle, Saint James the Greater, the Moor-slayer, is said to have appeared riding a white horse and bearing a white standard, and aided Asturian troops to defeat the Moors. This gave rise to the cult of Saint James in Iberia (see Way of St. James).

In thanks for the intervention of the Apostle, Ramiro is said to have instituted a forged grant called Voto de Santiago actually dating from the 12th century, a tax for the benefit of the Church that was only repealed by the Cortes of Cádiz in 1812.

=== Attempt to repopulate León ===
Ramiro's most important confrontation with the Muslim kingdoms of Iberia was not a success. Emir Abd ar-Rahman II of Córdoba likewise had to face Viking invaders, as well as internal rebellions led by Musa ibn Musa of the Banu Qasi family. Ramiro took advantage of the temporary respite to repopulate the city of León. This particular attempt at repopulation was short-lived. Abd ar-Rahman II dispatched both the Vikings and the rebels, and in 846 sent an army led by his son (later Muhammad I of Córdoba), forcing the Catholics to again evacuate León, which the Muslims then burned. The city was not reoccupied until 856, under Ordoño I.

=== Internal conflict and harsh justice ===
While Asturias under Ramiro was relatively free of foreign confrontations, the latter portion of the reign saw much internal conflict. As mentioned above, his ascent to the throne had been problematic, and he continued to encounter discontented and rebellious nobles. The Chronica Albeldense makes mention of two of these rebels in particular. After defeating the rebel prócer (grandee or high-ranking noble) Piniolo, Ramiro condemned him to death along with his seven sons. The leader of the second rebellion, the comes palatii Aldroito, he condemned to be blinded.

Ramiro acted with severity against latrones (thieves) whose number nonetheless increased the civil discord of his reign, and against magos, presumably the pagans still rooted amongst the more isolated settlements. The Chronica Albeldense praises Ramiro as Uirga iustitiae, that is, "the Rod of Justice".

== Marriages, descendants, and succession ==
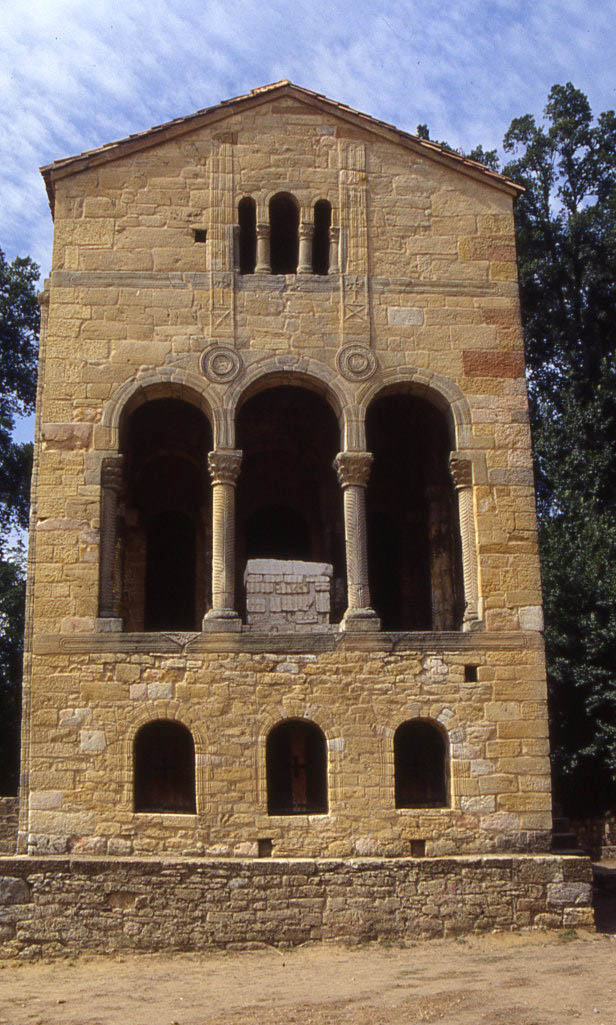
Santa María del Naranco in Oviedo was originally a recreational palace of Ramiro's, and then a church

All that is known of Ramiro's first marriage is that it must have occurred early enough for his son to have already been an adult at the time of Ramiro's succession. Ramiro's son Ordoño succeeded his father as king of Asturias upon the former's death.

Ramiro contracted his second marriage, to Paterna, around 842, the year of the death of his predecessor Alfonso II. The chronicle of his grandson asserts that when Alfonso II died, Ramiro was in the Castilian lands for his wedding, suggesting that his wife was Castilian. It is presumed that the bride in this marriage was the Paterna who appeared later as his widow.

There is no solid evidence of children other than Ordoño. Traditionally, Count Rodrigo of Castile (died 873) has been named as son of Ramiro and Paterna. The medievalist Justo Pérez de Urbel says that Rodrigo was named count of Castile because of his link to the Asturian royal family, and that it is possible that this link existed through Queen Paterna, but not necessarily through being her son.

Ramiro may have been the father of Gatón, Count of Astorga and of El Bierzo, since the 14th century Al-Bayan al-Mughrib of Ibn Idhari, states that Gatón was the 'brother' of Ordoño I de Asturias.

== Death and burial ==
Ramiro died 1 February 850, in his palace at Santa María del Naranco, located on Mount Naranco, near the city of Oviedo. He was buried in the Pantheon of Asturian Kings in the Cathedral of San Salvador, Oviedo, alongside his second wife, Paterna. His remains were deposited in a stone sepulchre, no longer extant, next to a similar sepulchre for his predecessor, Alfonso II el Casto. His sepulchre was inscribed:

"OBIIT DIVAE MEMORIAE RANIMIRUS REX DIE KAL. FEBRUARII. ERA DCCCLXXXVIII. OBTESTOR VOS OMNES QUI HAEC LECTURI ESTIS. UT PRO REQUIE ILLIUS ORARE NON DESINETIS".

The inscription gives the date of his death as being February "888" due to the Spanish Era calendar beginning in 38 BC.

== The Ramirense style in architecture ==
The art and architecture of Ramiro's reign forms the Pre-Romanesque Ramirense phase of Asturian art. His court was the center of great splendor, of which the palace and church of Santa María del Naranco and San Miguel de Lillo are testimony. On the southern slopes of Mount Naranco, near the city of Oviedo, Ramiro I ordered the construction of the palace of Santa María del Naranco and a church known as San Miguel de Lillo or Liño. The church collapsed in the thirteenth century, and today only about a third of the original survives. Related service buildings did not survive even as ruins. Another example of Ramirense architecture is the church of Santa Cristina de Lena, near the municipality of Lena, some 30 kilometres (19 mi) from Oviedo. The palace and the two churches have been designated World Heritage Sites by UNESCO.

Ramirense architecture introduced barrel vaults made of tufa (a relatively lightweight limestone). These were novel not only with respect to earlier architecture of the region but in terms of the European architecture of the period, including that of Muslim Spain, which used wooden roofs.

Ramiro I of Asturias Astur-Leonese dynasty Born: circa 790 Died: 1 February 850
Regnal titles
Preceded by Nepotian	King of Asturias; 842–850	Succeeded by Ordoño I
