= Ramiro I =

Ramiro I may refer to:

- Ramiro I of Asturias (died 850)
- Ramiro I of Aragon (died 1063)
