= San Miguel de Lillo =

Church in Oviedo, Spain

Church of St. Michael of Lillo San Miguel de Lillo (in Spanish) Samiguel de Lliño (in Asturian)
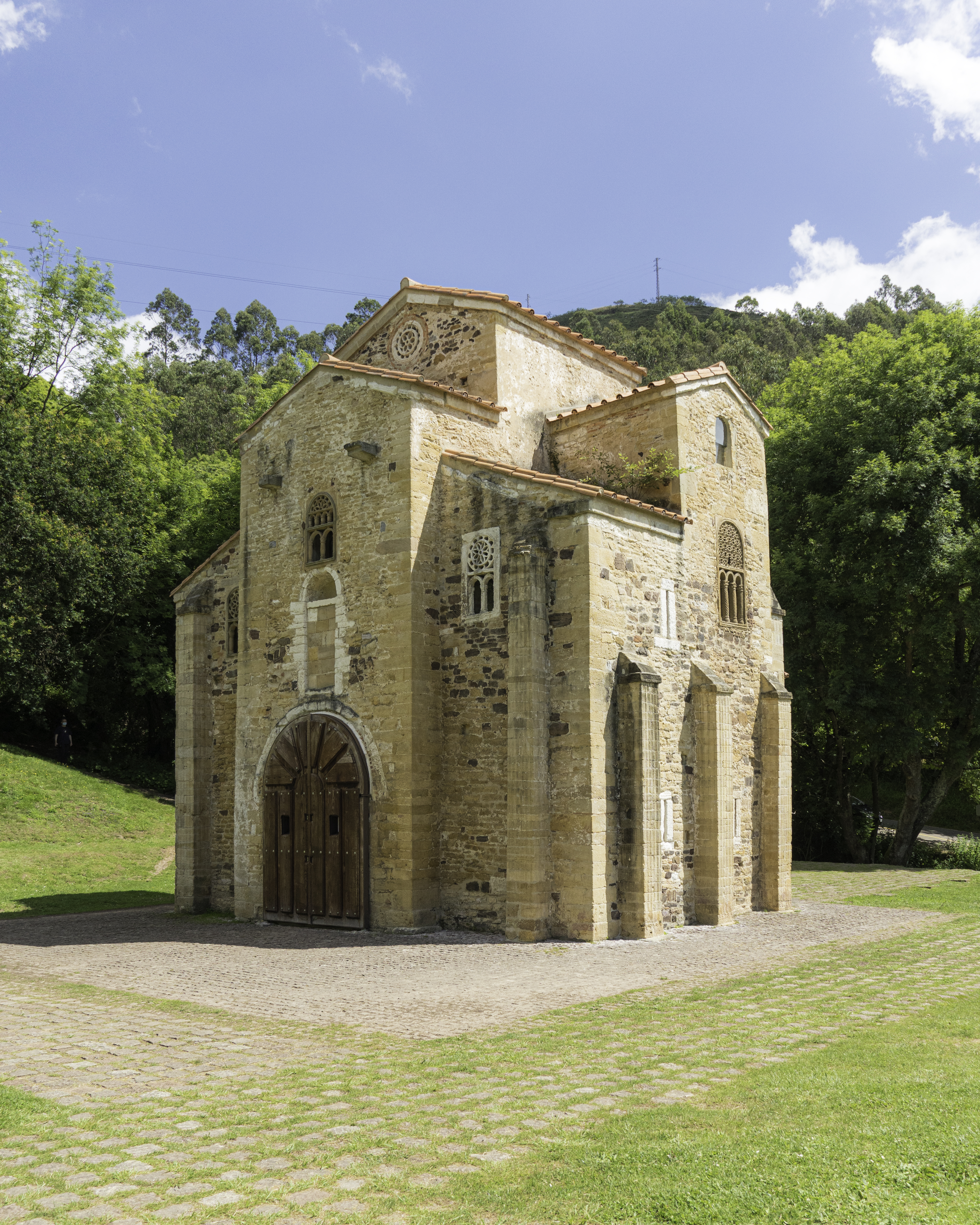

Religion
- Affiliation: Roman Catholic
- Ecclesiastical or organisational status: Inactive
- Year consecrated: 848

Location
- Location: Oviedo (Asturias), Spain
- Interactive map of Church of St. Michael of Lillo; San Miguel de Lillo (in Spanish); Samiguel de Lliño (in Asturian)
- Coordinates: 43°22′49″N 5°52′6.2″W

Architecture
- Type: Church
- Style: Pre-Romanesque
- Completed: 842

Specifications
- Direction of façade: SSE
- Length: 12 metres (39 ft)
- Width: 10 metres (33 ft)
- UNESCO World Heritage Site
- Type: Cultural
- Criteria: ii, iv, vi
- Designated: 1985 (9th session)
- Parent listing: Monuments of Oviedo and the Kingdom of the Asturias
- Reference no.: 312-001
- Region: Europe and North America
- Spanish Cultural Heritage
- Official name: Iglesia de San Miguel de Lillo
- Type: Non-movable
- Criteria: Monument
- Designated: 24 January 1885
- Reference no.: RI-51-0000046

Website
- Official website

Ground plan

St. Michael of Lillo (Spanish: San Miguel de Lillo, Asturian: Samiguel de Lliño) is a Roman Catholic church built on the Naranco mount, near the Church of Santa María del Naranco in Asturias. It was completed in 842 and it was consecrated by Ramiro I of Asturias and his wife Paterna in the year 848. It was originally dedicated to St. Mary until this worship passed to the nearby palace in the 12th century, leaving this church dedicated to Saint Michael. It has been a part of the UNESCO World Heritage Site "Monuments of Oviedo and the Kingdom of the Asturias" since 1985.

It originally had a basilica ground plan, three aisles with a barrel vaults and probably about five bays long, of which only the "Frankish-style royal 'westwork'" remains, since the building collapsed during the 12th or 13th century. Although narrow, the edifice is quite high due to the outside buttressing. Conserved are the fantastic jambs in the vestibule and the extraordinary plate tracery of the windows sculpted each from a single slab of stone by perforating it. Coupled with columns the biforas of the west facade are topped above a slender lintel beam by a roundel or a half-roundel with a quadrifora beneath. The transept has triforas with elaborate geometric tracery. The walls were originally entirely covered by murals similar to Santuyano of which only fragments remain.

Ambrosio de Morales, a historian of the 16th century, described the church in his Viaje Santo and the Crónica general: "Viewed from the outside, its good proportions are pleasing to the eye, and viewed from within, the harmonious arrangement of the transept, dome, main chapel, gallery, staircases leading to them, bell tower, and all the rest is delightful. There is a certain diversity in size and form, with one element rising and another falling, one expanding and another receding, allowing the parts of the building to fully appreciate each other, giving space to one another so that they may appear as they are and how beautiful they are. All the workmanship is smooth, and the only richness comes from the marbles, fine jasper, and porphyry used to form the transept, main chapel, and its sections, all of which are Gothic in style, although they have much of the Romanesque influence."

The entrance protrudes slightly from the three-part front, above the low barrel vaulted vestibule a gallery or upper choir is reached by stairwells in both flanks, which have the same width as the transepts. The original apse might have symmetrically mirrored the west facade with its protruding mid-section, similar to the neighboring Church of St. Mary. Morales compares it with the Cámara Santa in Oviedo.

== Gallery ==
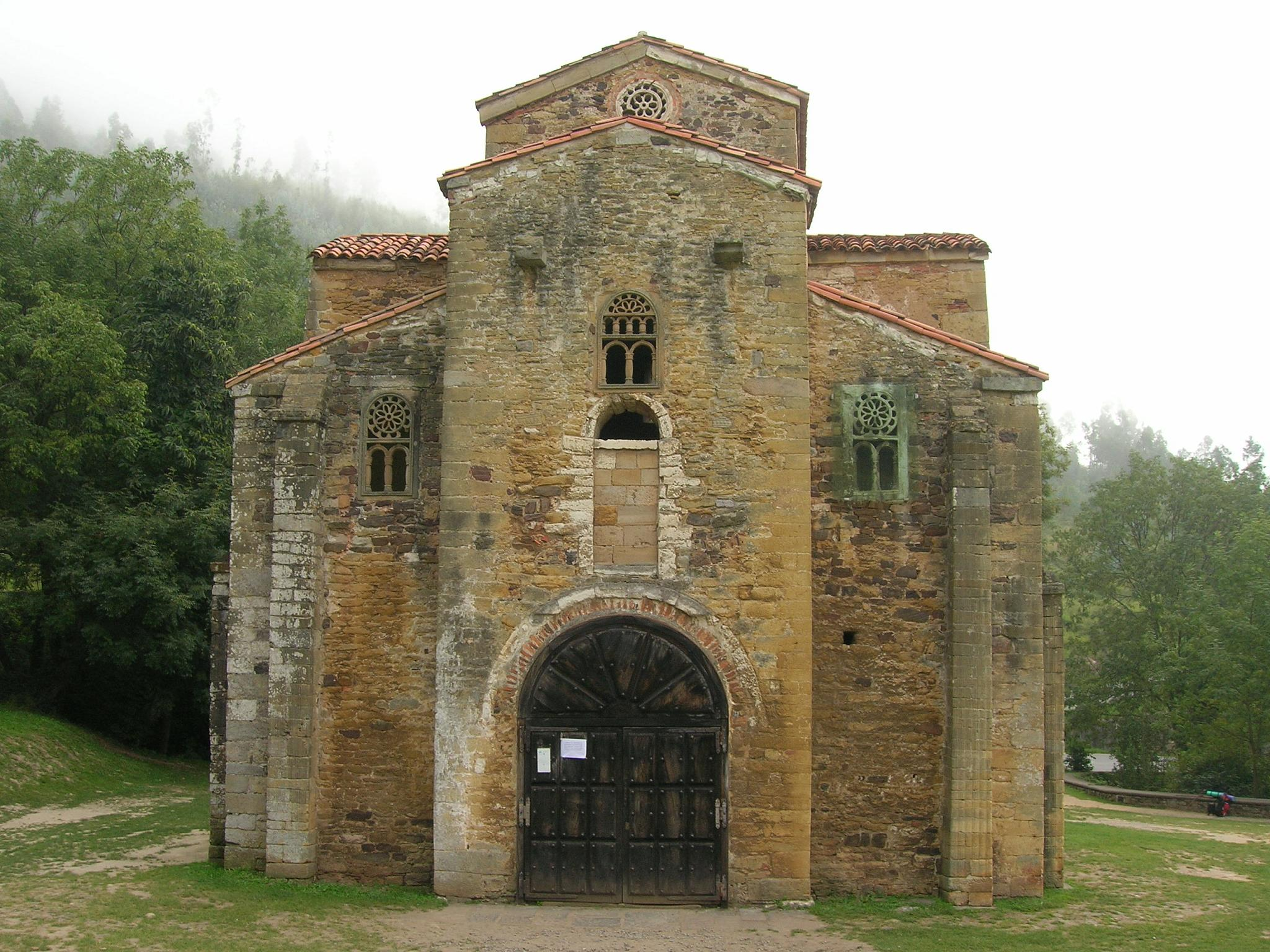
West façade

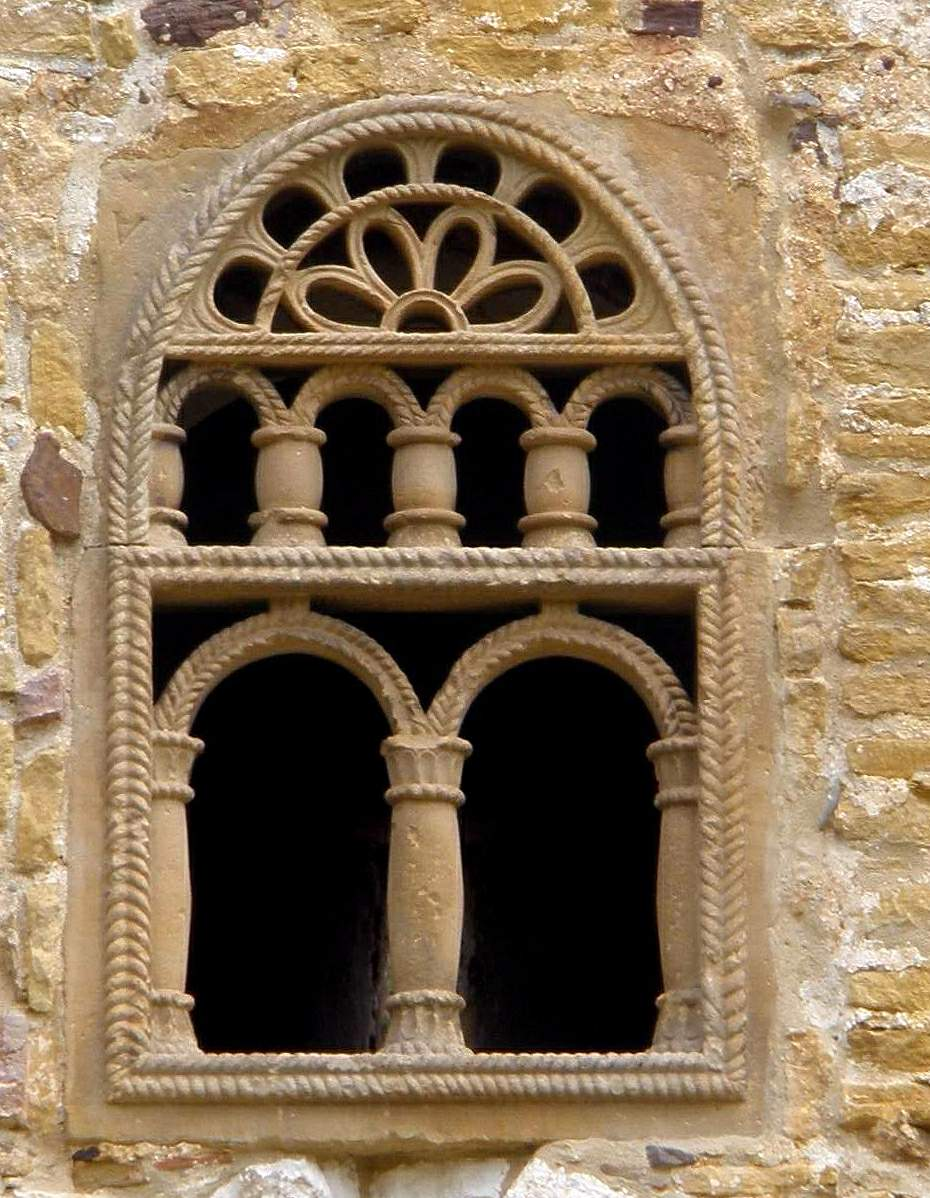
Central window of west facade

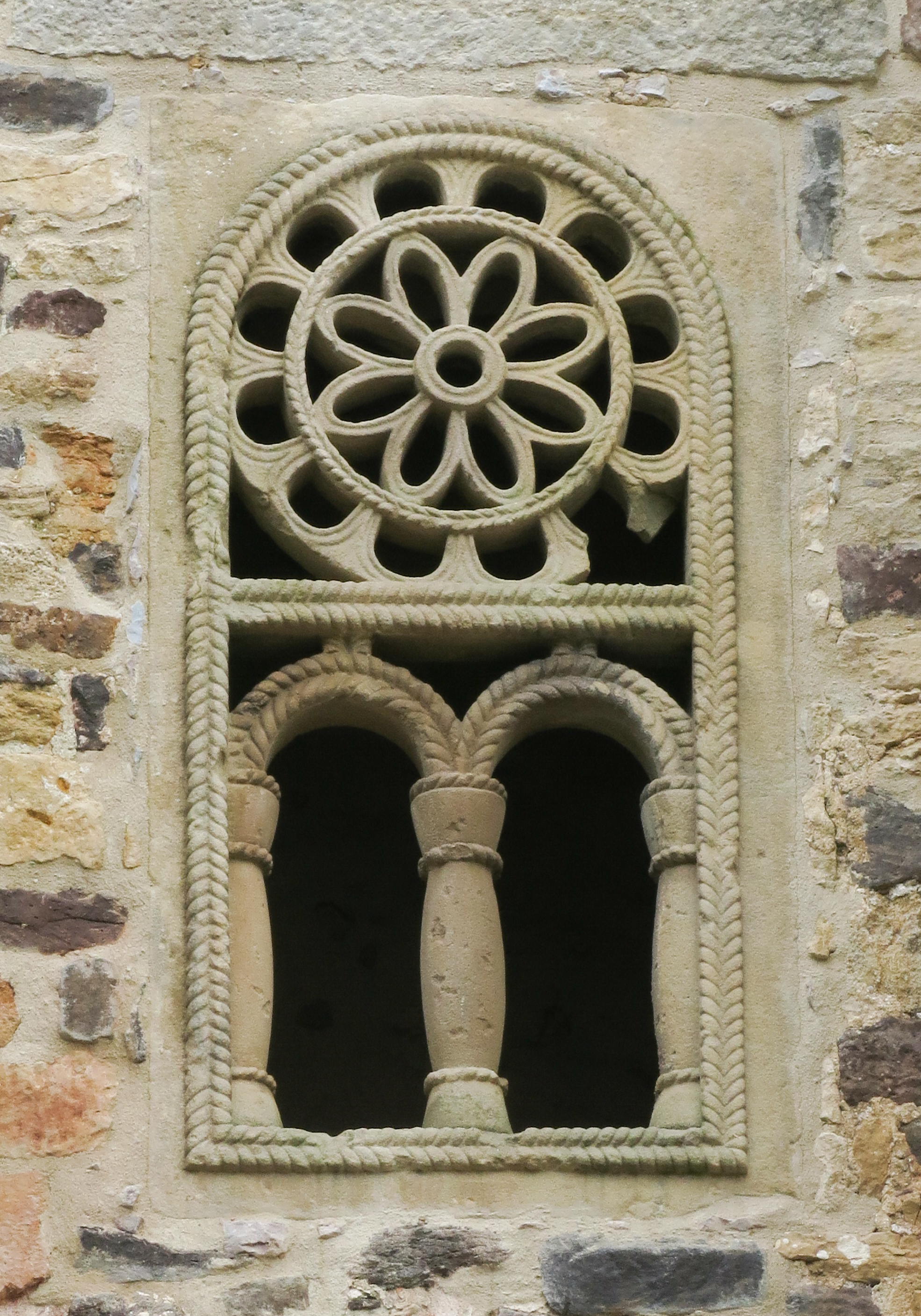
Window to the left above the portal

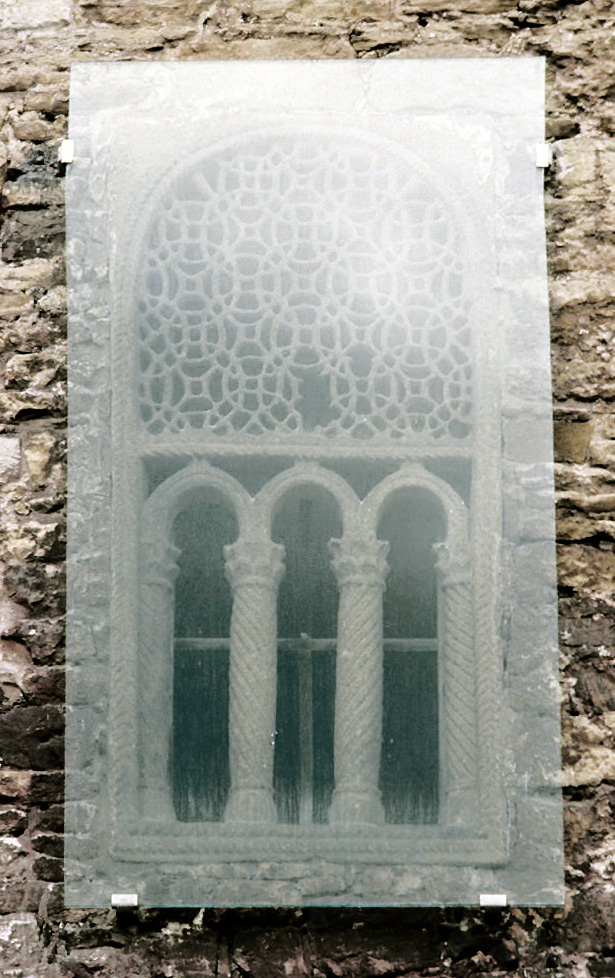
Trifora of the transept with geometric plate tracery

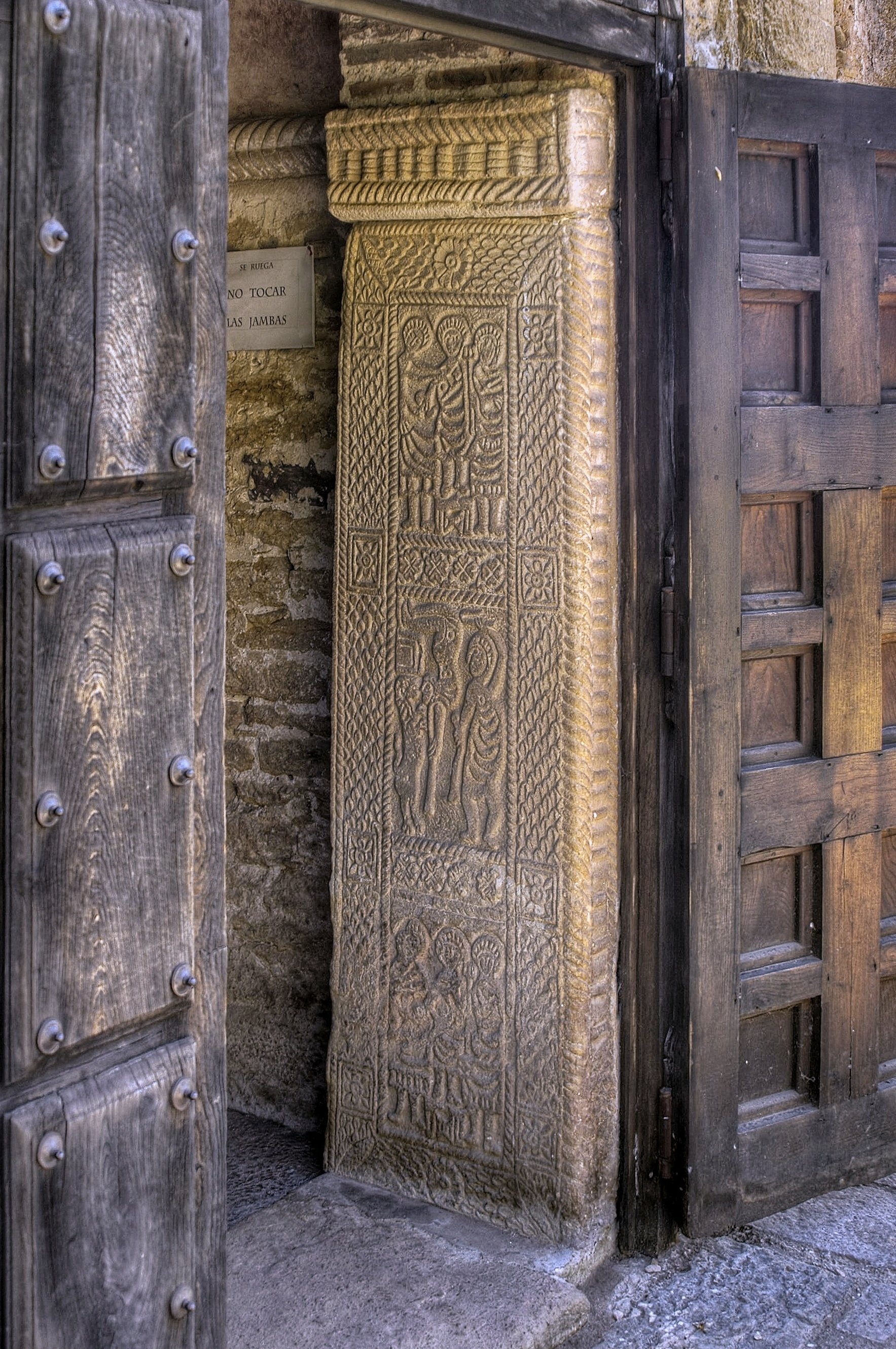
Portal jambs

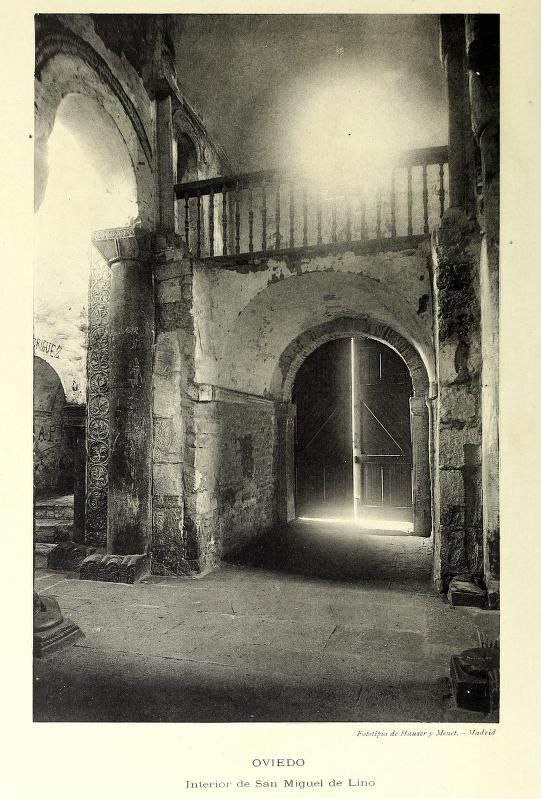
Interior view of vestibule with gallery

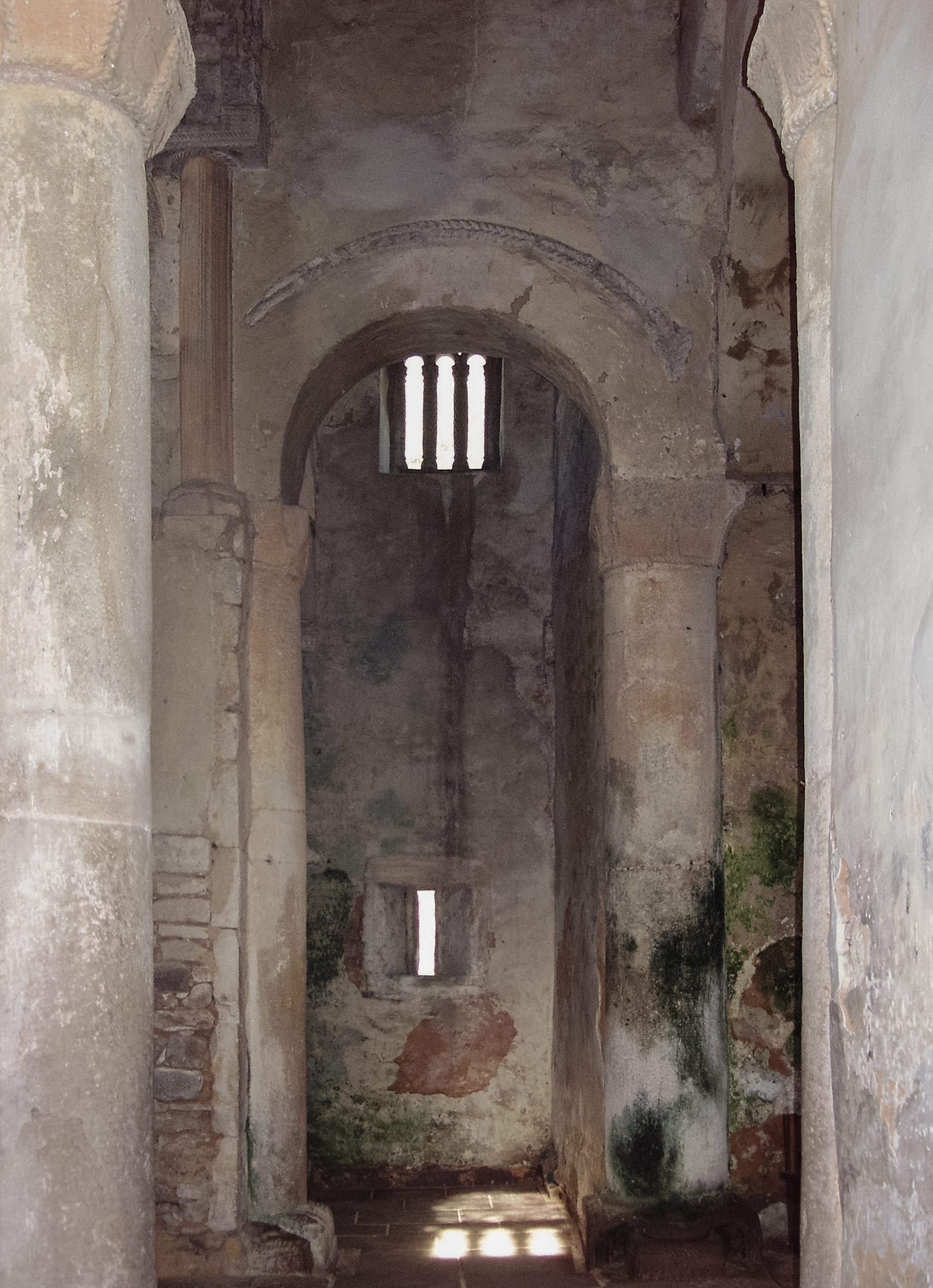
Interior view into the south transept with lighting through a trifora

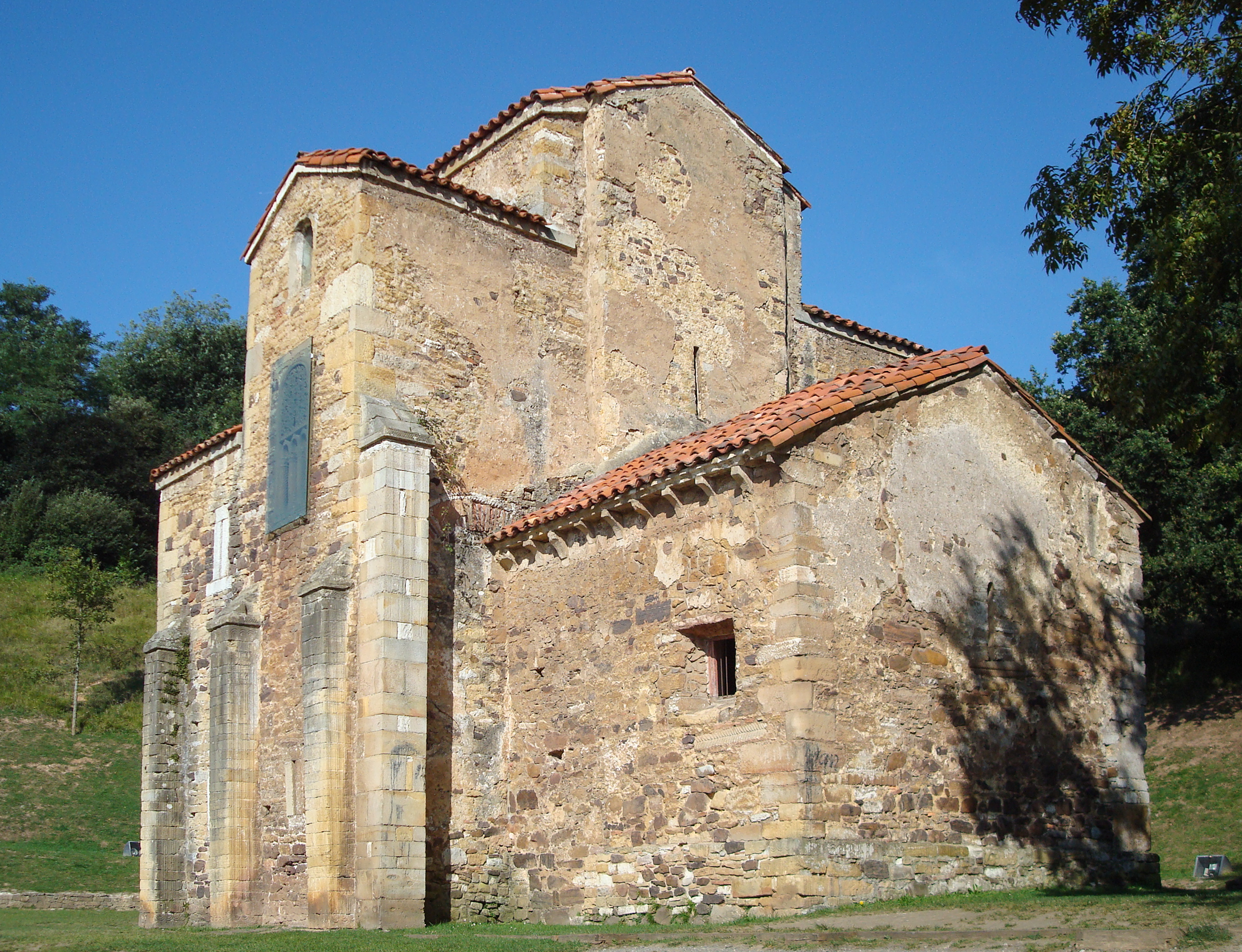
Southeast view

== See also ==
- Asturian architecture
- Catholic Church in Spain
- Rose window

== Literature ==
- de Selgas, Fortunato (1908). Monumentos ovetenses del siglo IX (in Spanish). Madrid: San Francisco de Sales. pp. 126–137(here referred to as San Miguel de Lino).
- Arias Paramo, Lorenzo (1992). "Geometría y proporción en la arquitectura prerrománica asturiana". Actas del III Congreso de Arqueología Medieval Española (in Spanish). Oviedo: Universidad de Oviedo: 27–37. ISBN 978-84-604-1916-7.
- Moffitt, John F. (1999). The Arts in Spain. London: Thames and Hudson. pp. 42f. ISBN 978-0-500-20315-6.
