= Santa María del Naranco =

Roman Catholic church and UNESCO World Heritage Site in Oviedo, Spain

Church of St Mary at Mount Naranco Iglesia de Santa María del Naranco
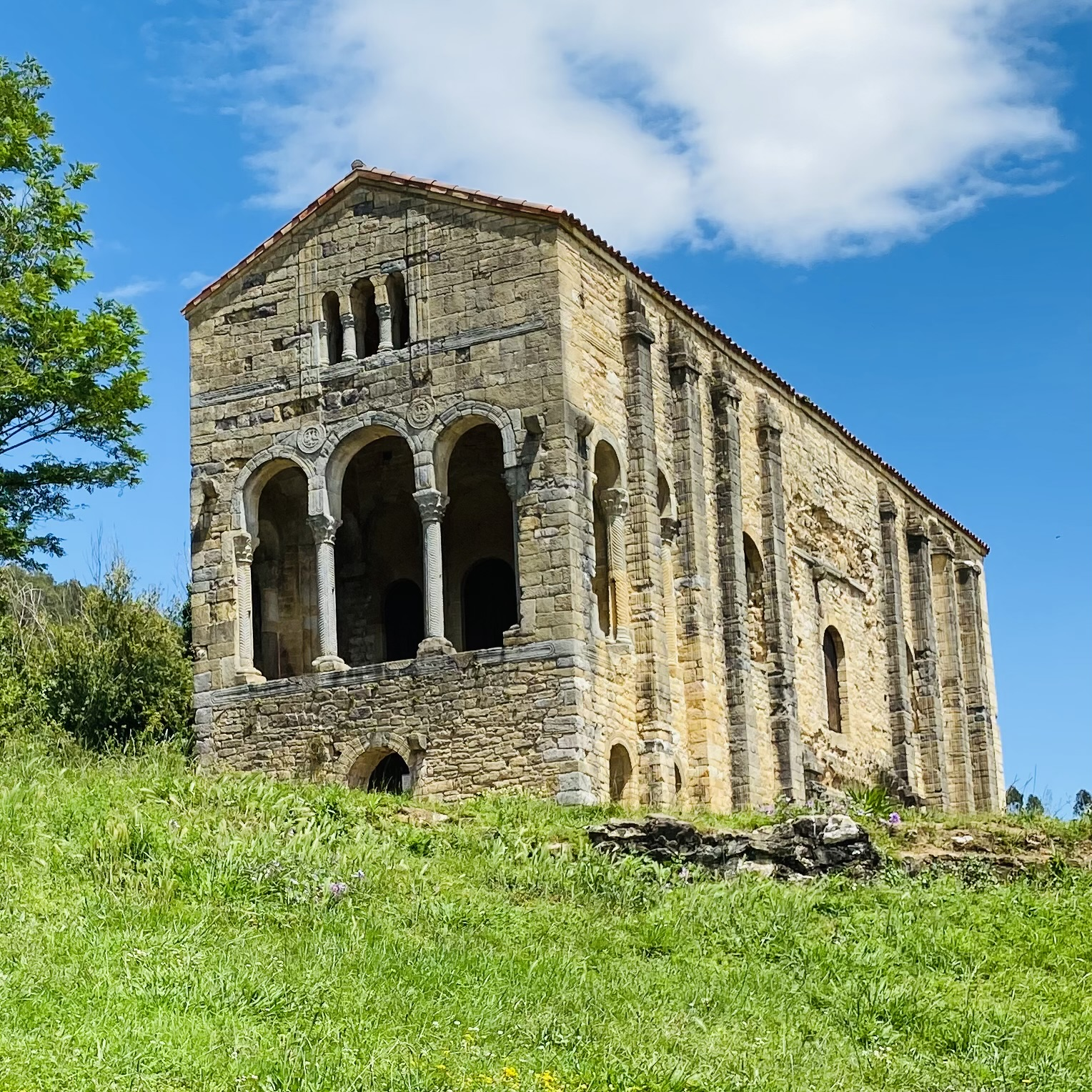

Religion
- Affiliation: Roman Catholic
- Province: Asturias
- Ecclesiastical or organisational status: Inactive
- Year consecrated: 848

Location
- Location: Oviedo, Spain
- Interactive map of Church of St Mary at Mount Naranco; Iglesia de Santa María del Naranco
- Coordinates: 43°22′45″N 5°51′58″W

Architecture
- Type: Church
- Style: Pre-Romanesque

Specifications
- Direction of façade: O
- Length: 20 metres (66 ft)
- Width: 10 metres (33 ft)
- UNESCO World Heritage Site
- Official name: Monuments of Oviedo and the Kingdom of the Asturias
- Type: Cultural
- Criteria: i, ii, vi
- Designated: 1985 (9th session)
- Reference no.: 312
- State Party: Spain
- Region: Europe and North America
- Spanish Cultural Heritage
- Official name: Santa María del Naranco
- Type: Non-movable
- Designated: 24 January 1885
- Reference no.: RI-51-0000047

Website
- https://www.santamariadelnaranco.es/

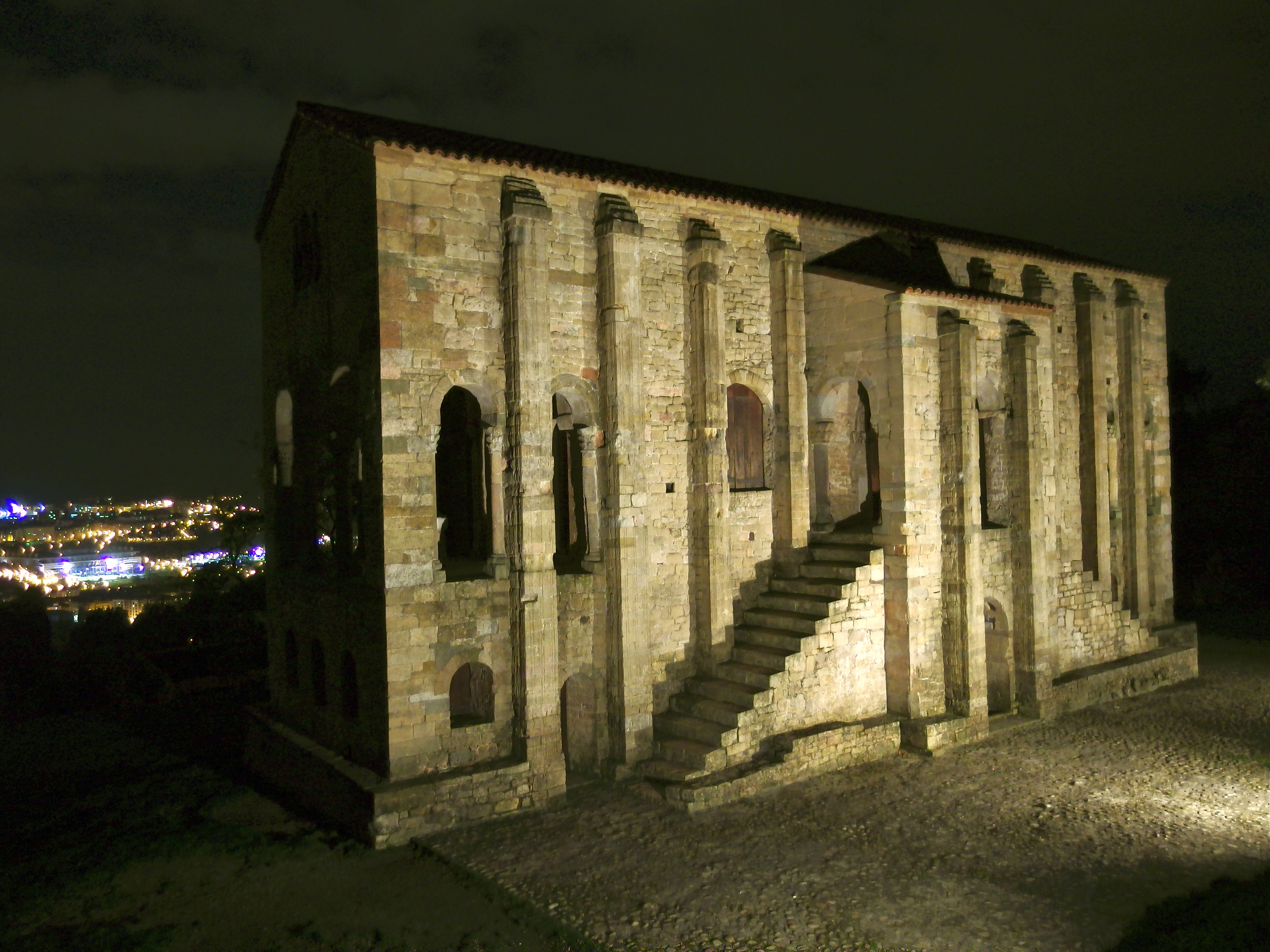
View at night

The church of Saint Mary at Mount Naranco (Spanish: Iglesia de Santa María del Naranco; Asturian: Ilesia de Santa María'l Narancu) is a pre-Romanesque Asturian building on the slope of Mount Naranco situated 3 kilometres (1.9 mi) from Oviedo, northern Spain. Ramiro I of Asturias ordered it to be built as a royal palace, part of a larger complex that also incorporated the nearby church of San Miguel de Lillo, 100 meters away. The palace was completed in 842 and had in part a religious function, being consecrated in 848. Its structural features, such as the barrel vault—with transverse ribs corresponding one-to-one with contraforts at the exterior, make it a clear precursor of the Romanesque construction. The exterior decorations, as well as the use of stilted arches, mark the intended verticality of the composition.

It was declared a Monumento Nacional on 24 January 1885. Along with all other national monuments of Spain, it was classified as a Bien de Interés Cultural in June 1985. It was declared a World Heritage Site by UNESCO in December 1985.

== History ==
Built as a recreational palace, it is situated on the southern side of Mount Naranco facing Oviedo, and was originally part of a series of royal buildings located in the outskirts. Its character as a civil building changed in the 12th century when it was converted into a church dedicated to St. Mary. The Palace of Santa María del Naranco, involved a significant stylistic, morphological, constructive and decorative renovation of Pre-Romanesque, supplementing it with new, innovative resources, representing a leap forward with respect to immediately previous periods.

On its altar, a Latin inscription provides the date of consecration:(...) Per Famulum Tuum Ranimirum. Principe Gloriosum Cum Paterna Regina Coniuge Renovasti Hoc Habitaculum Nimia. Vetustate Consumptvm Et Pro Eis Aedificasti Hanc Haram Benedictionis Gloriosae. Sanctae Mariae In Locum Hunc Summum Exaudi Eos De Caelorum Habitaculo Tuo Et. (...) Die VIIII^{o} Kalendas Iulias Era Dccclxxxvia. (Note: (...) by means of your servant Ramiro, glorious prince, together with his wife Queen Paterna renewed this building consumed by much antiquity, and by means of them built the east altar for the benediction of glorious Saint Maria in this place (...) The ninth day of the calends of July 886 (23 June 848).)

This palace's innovations amazed chroniclers, who mention it repeatedly. The Crónica Silense, written around the year 1015, about 300 years after the construction of the palace, said that Ramiro I of Asturias "built many constructions, two miles away from Oviedo, with sandstone and marble in a vaulted work: (...) He also made (...), a palace without wood, of admirable construction and vaulted below and above,..."

The chroniclers marvelled at its proportions and slender shapes, its rich, varied decoration and the introduction of elongated barrel vaults thanks to the transverse arches, allowing support and eliminating wooden ceilings. This solution, timidly advanced in the Camara Santa (English: Holy Chamber) of the Cathedral of San Salvador of Oviedo, fully matured in Santa María del Naranco.

The palace, on a rectangular ground plan, has two floors. The lower level, or crypt, quite low, has a central chamber and another two located on either side. The upper floor is accessed via a double exterior stairway adjoining the facade, leading into an identical layout as the lower floor; a central or noble hall with six blind semicircular arches along the walls, supported by columns built into the wall, and a mirador at each end. These are accessed via three arches, similar to those onto the wall, resting on columns with helicoidal rope moulding, typical of Pre-Romanesque. The barrel vault is made from tufa stone, and is held up by six transverse arches resting on consoles.

Santa María del Naranco represented a step forward from a decorative point of view by enriching the habitual standards and models with elements from painting, gold work and the textile arts. The rich decoration is concentrated in the hall and miradors of the upper floor, where it is especially worth noting the cubic-prismatic capitals (of Byzantine influence), decorated with reliefs framed by cord decoration (from local tradition) in trapezoid and triangular shapes, inside which there are sculpted forms of animals and humans. This kind of motif is repeated on the disks with central medallions located above the blind arches' intersections. The 32 medallions distributed around the building are similar in size and shape, varying the decorative designs and the interior figures (quadrupeds, birds, bunches of grapes, fantastic animals), a style inherited from the Visigoth period, in turn descended from Byzantine tradition.

The medallions have decorative bands above them, again framed by rope moulding, inside which four figures are sculpted and arranged symmetrically; the upper two carrying loads on their heads and the lower two representing soldiers on horseback carrying swords. These figures seem to have some kind of symbolic social meaning; the warriors who defend and support the men of prayer, or alternatively, the royal and ecclesiastic orders complementing each other.

Santa María del Naranco shows other sculptural elements; a Greek cross appears sculpted as emblem of the Asturian monarchy. Other sculptural elements, such as the capitals of Corinthian inspiration on the miradors' triple-arched Windows or the altar stone in the eastern mirador (originally from the neighbouring Church of San Miguel de Lillo), make this palace a distinctive building in Pre-Romanesque It is the only palace complex that has lasted until the present day with both Visigothic and Carolingian court structures.

== Building ==
The church of St Mary at Mount Naranco is unlike any contemporary example we are acquainted with. Practically it is a Roman tetrastyle amphiprostyle temple, if such terms can be applied to a Christian edifice. So far as we can understand, the altar was placed originally in one of the porticos, and the worship was consequently probably external. The great difference seems to have been that there was a lateral entrance, and some of the communicants at least must have been accommodated in the interior. The ornamentation of the interior differs from classical models more than the plan. The columns are spirally fluted — a classical form — but the capitals are angular, and made to support arches. On the walls also there are curious medallions from which the vaulting-ribs spring, which seem peculiar to the style, since they are found repeated in the church of Santa Cristina de Lena.

== Gallery ==
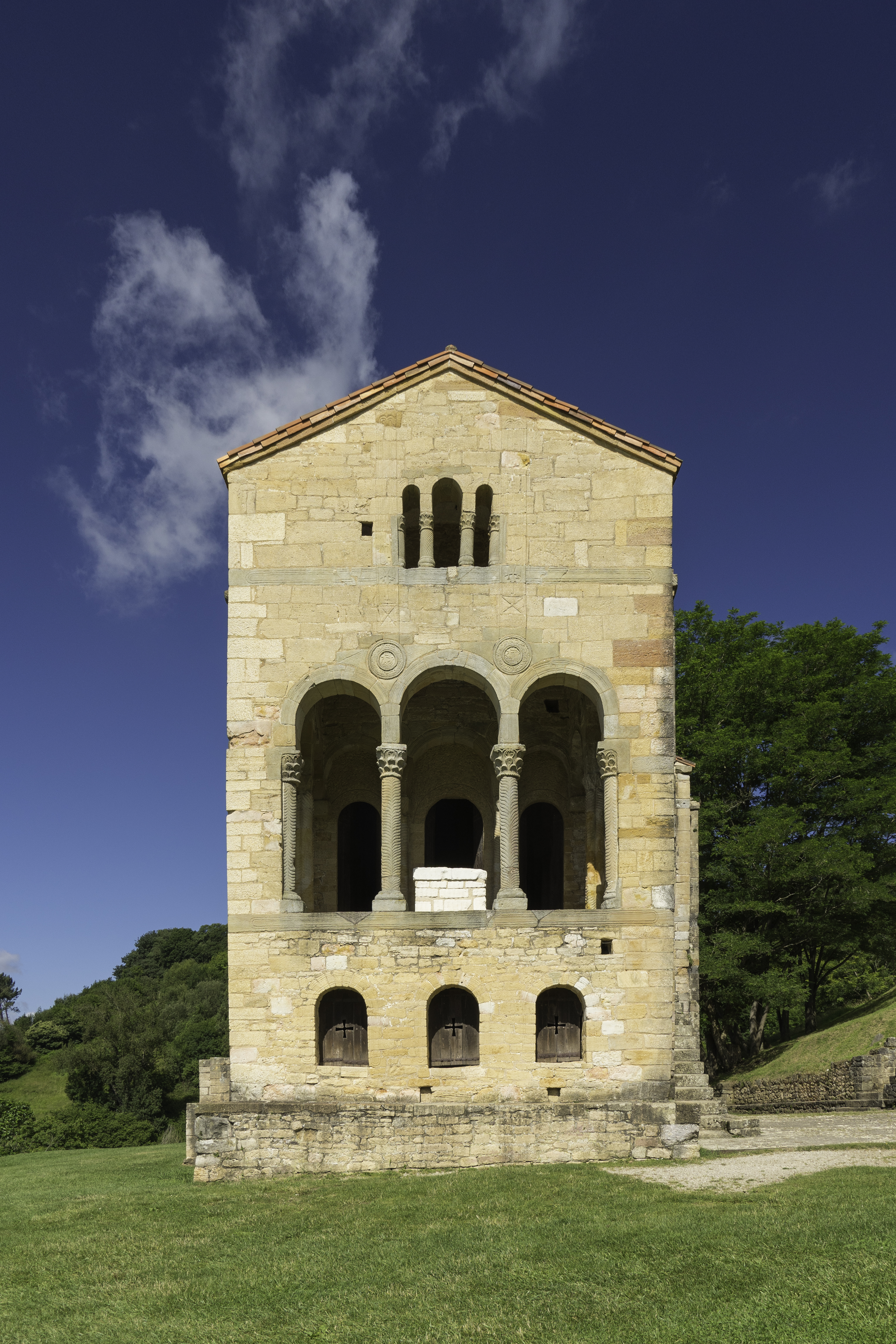
East facade with belvedere

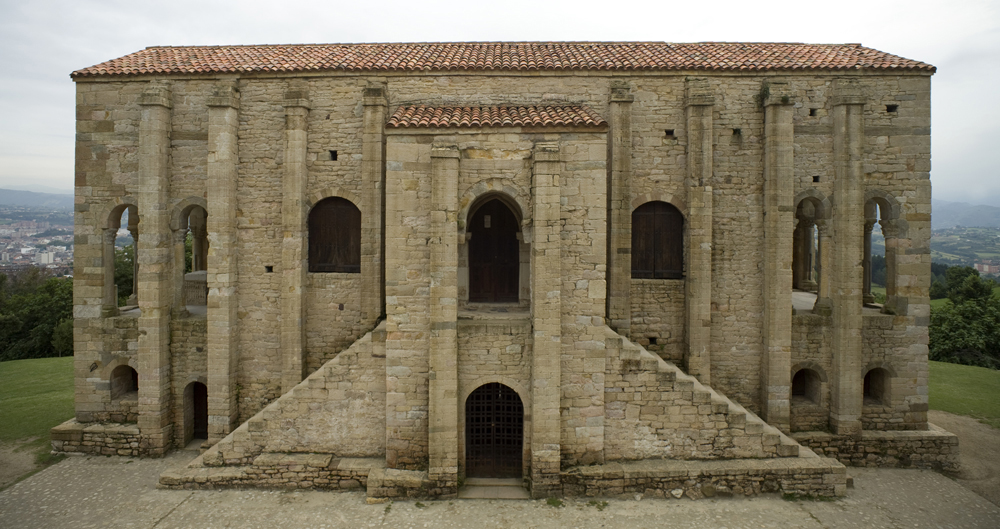
North facade

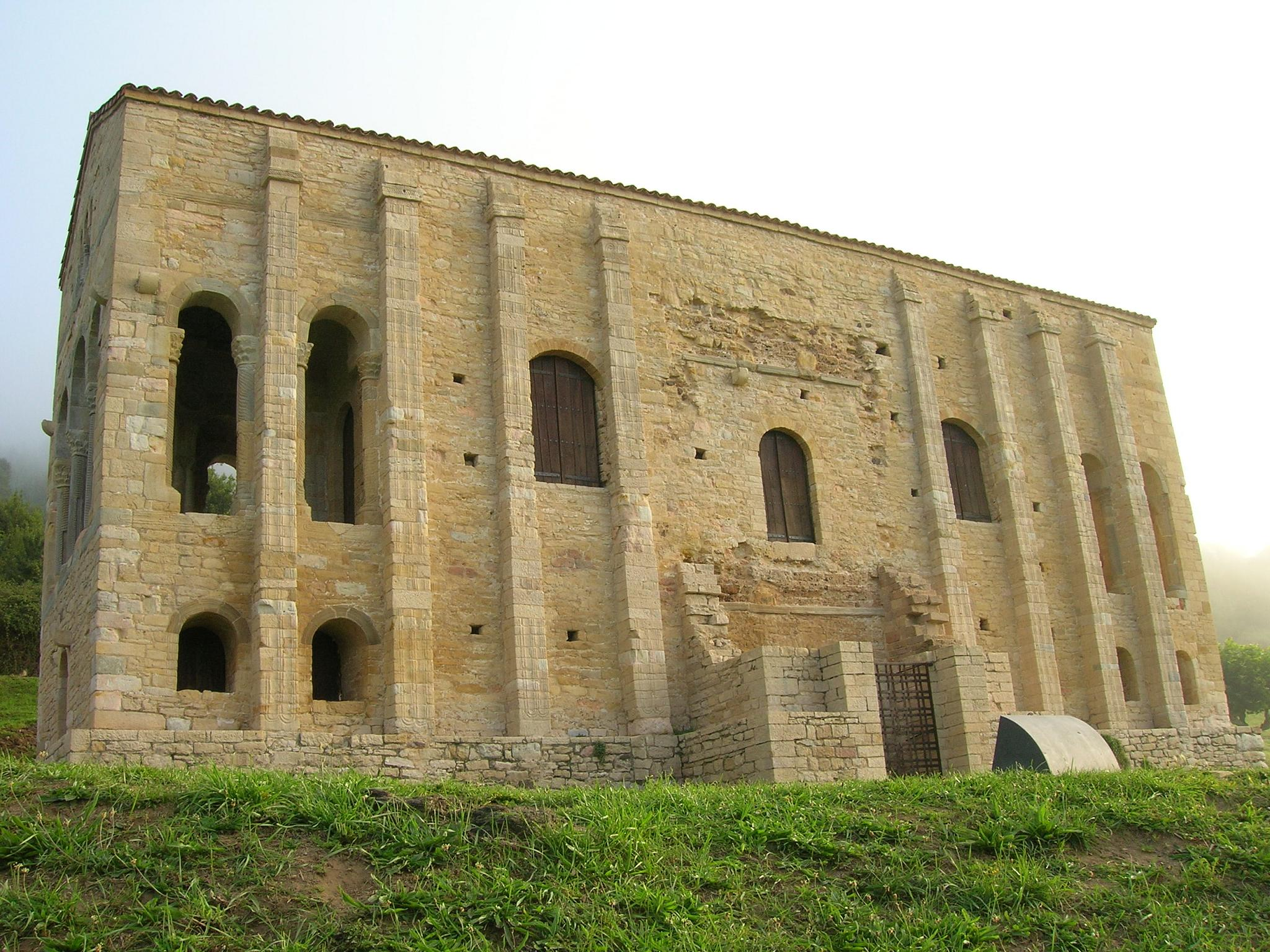
South facade

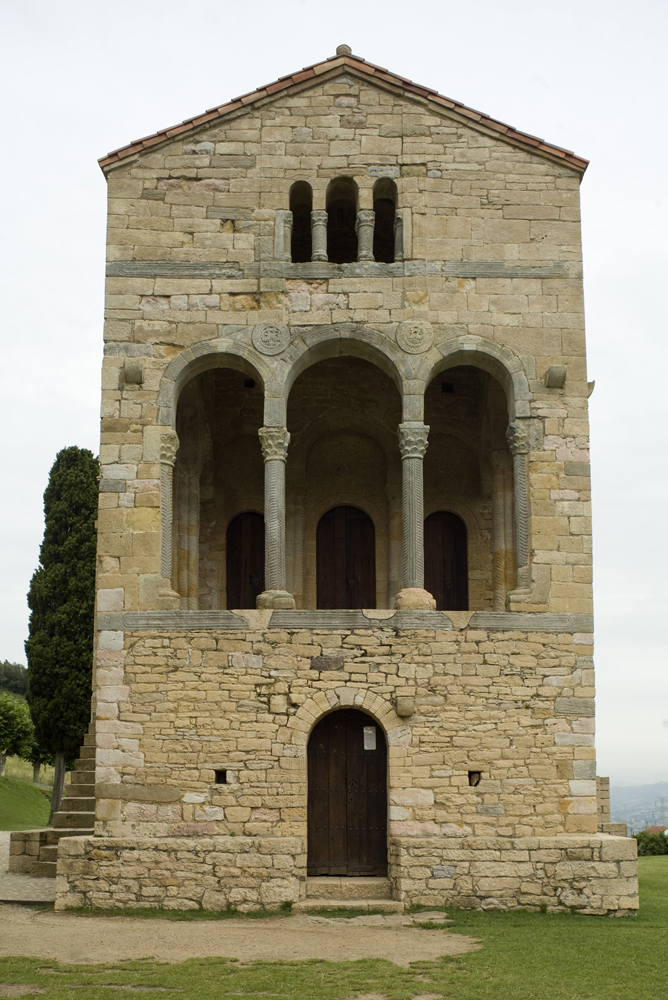
West facade

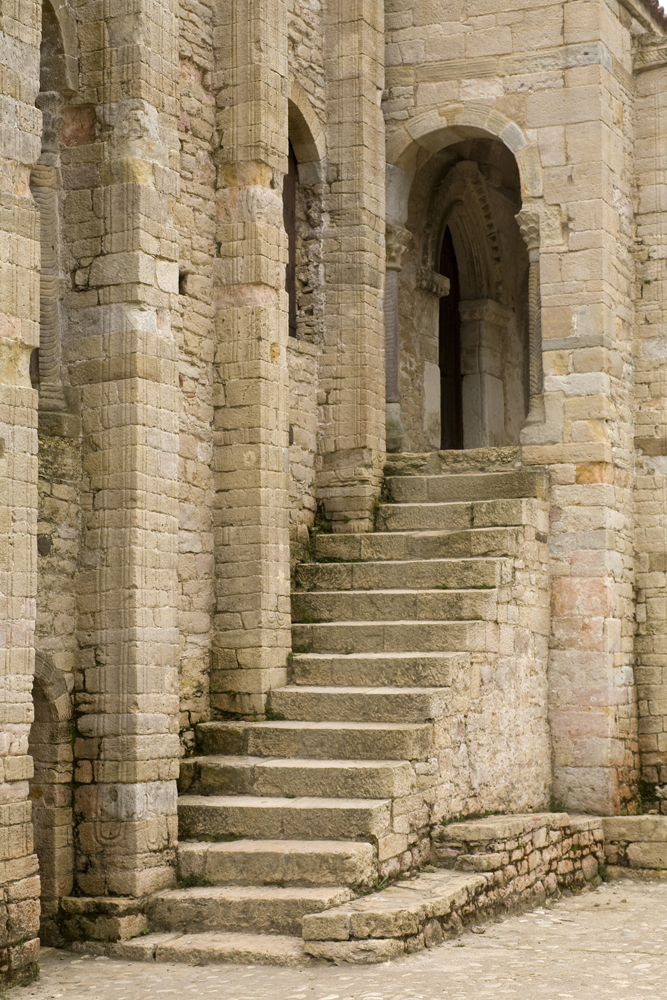
Staircase

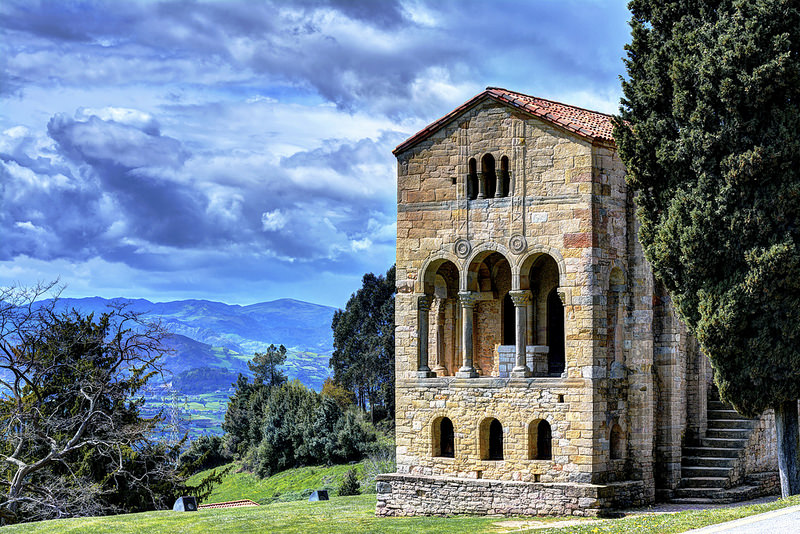
Postcard view

Floor plan of the church

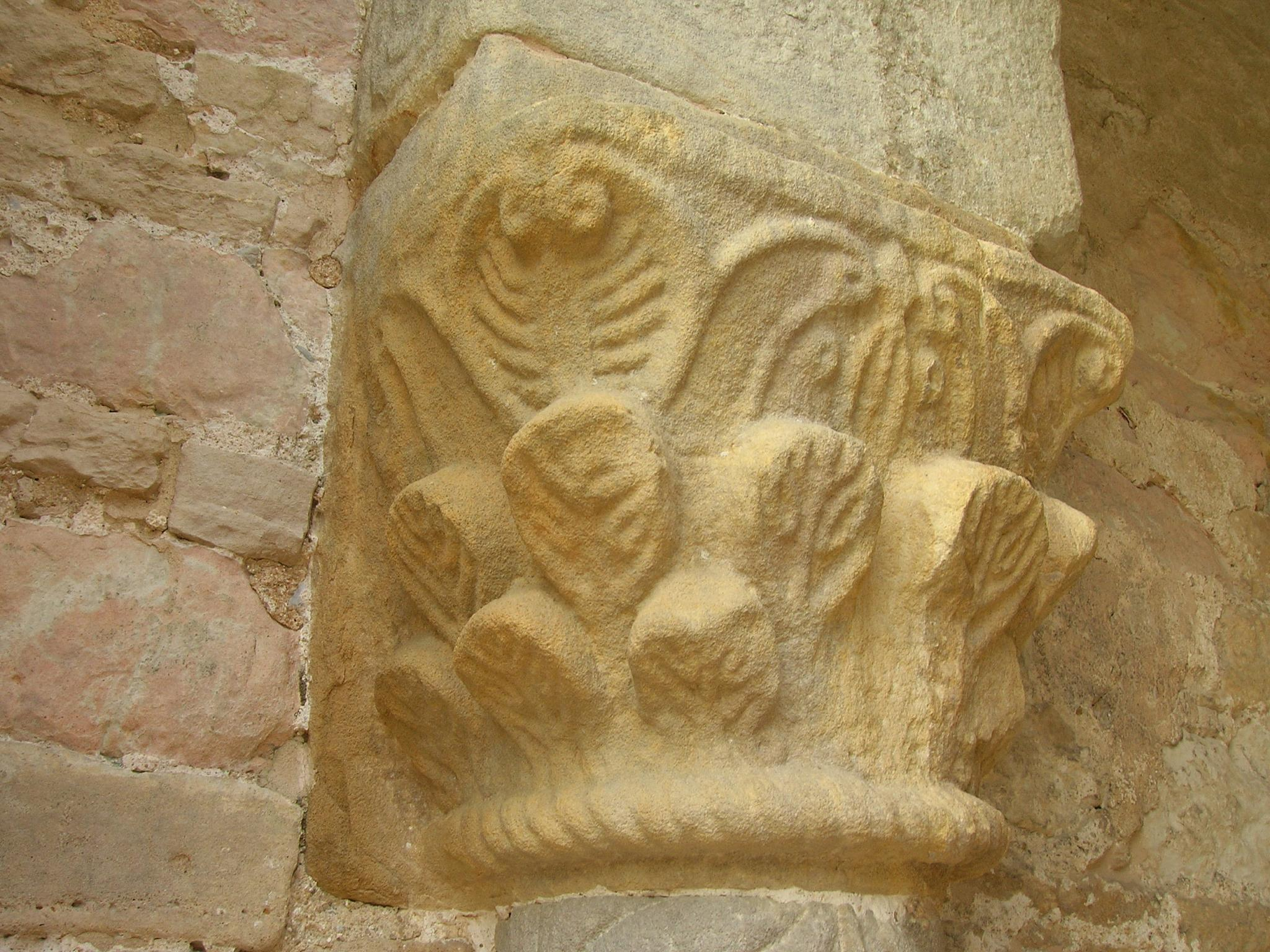
Capital detail

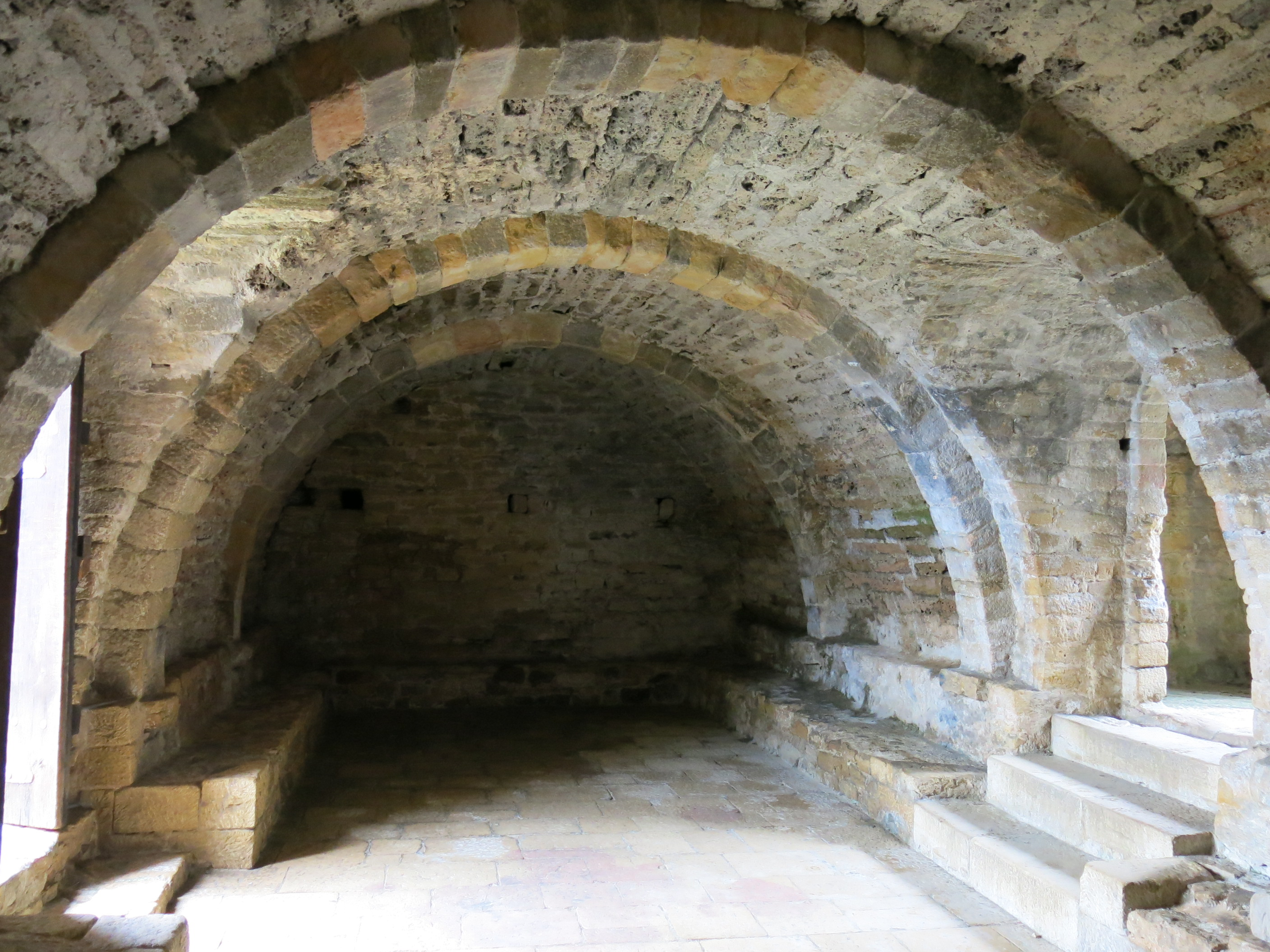
Interior view of the lower floor

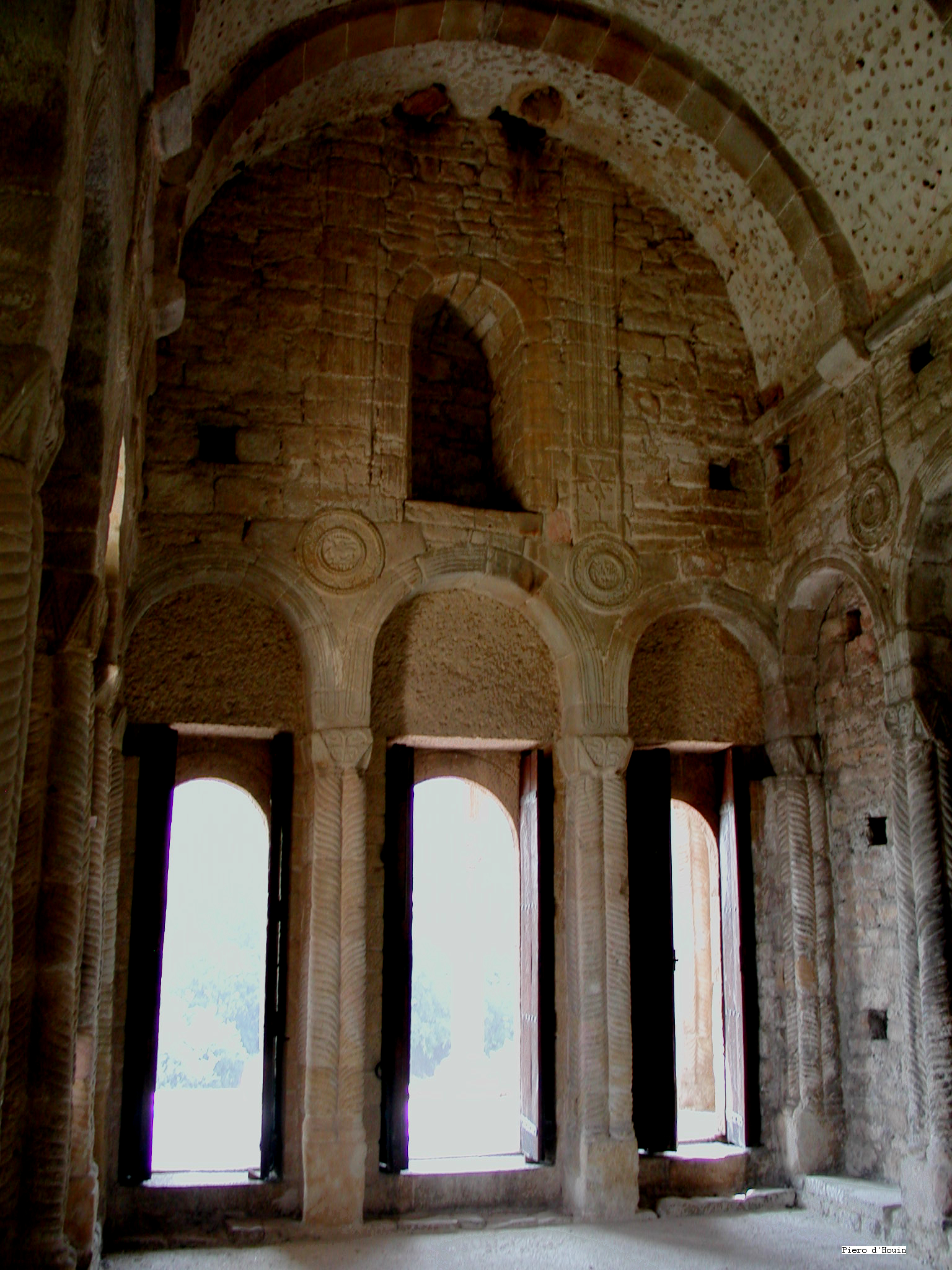
Interior

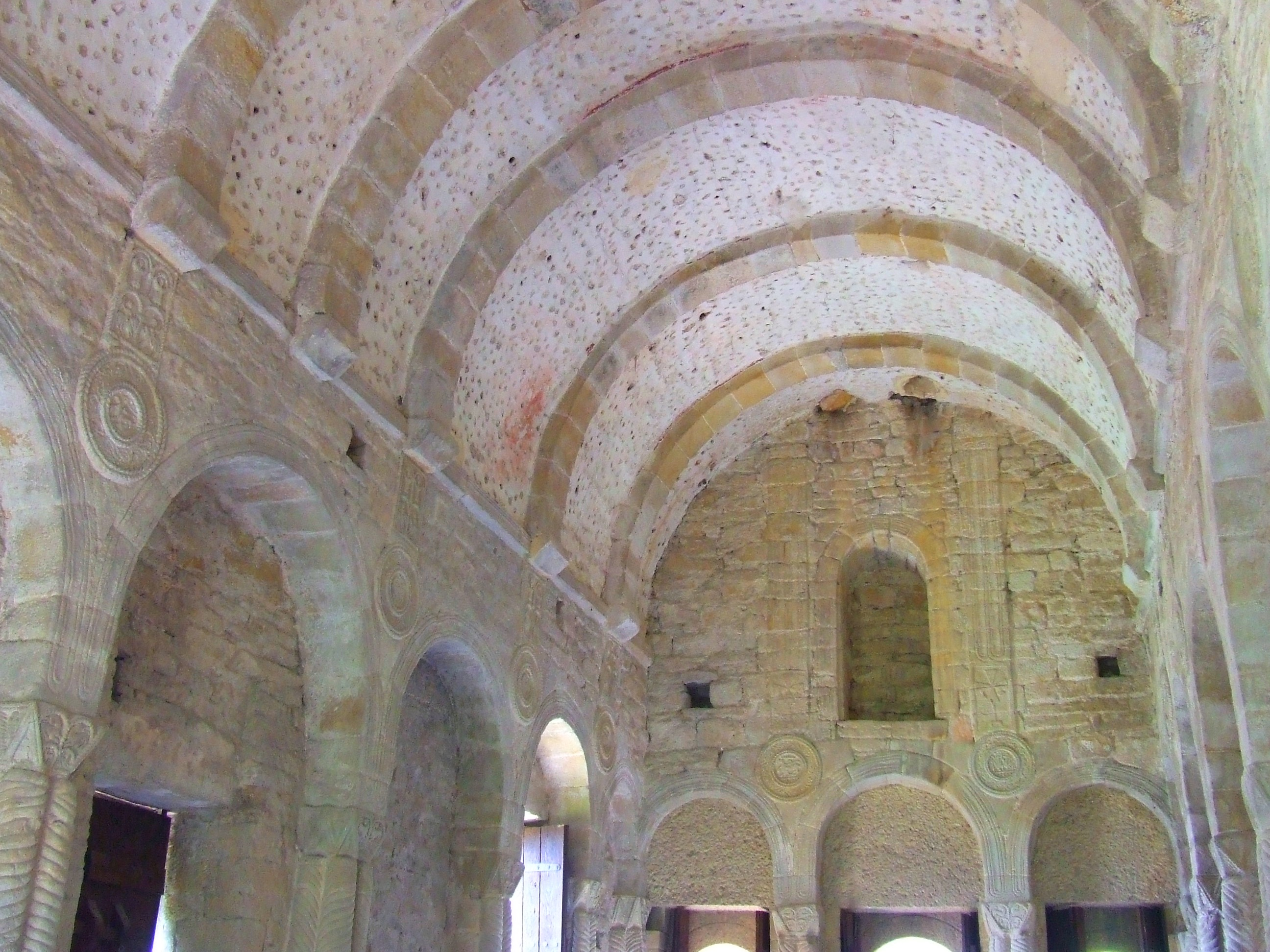
Main hall

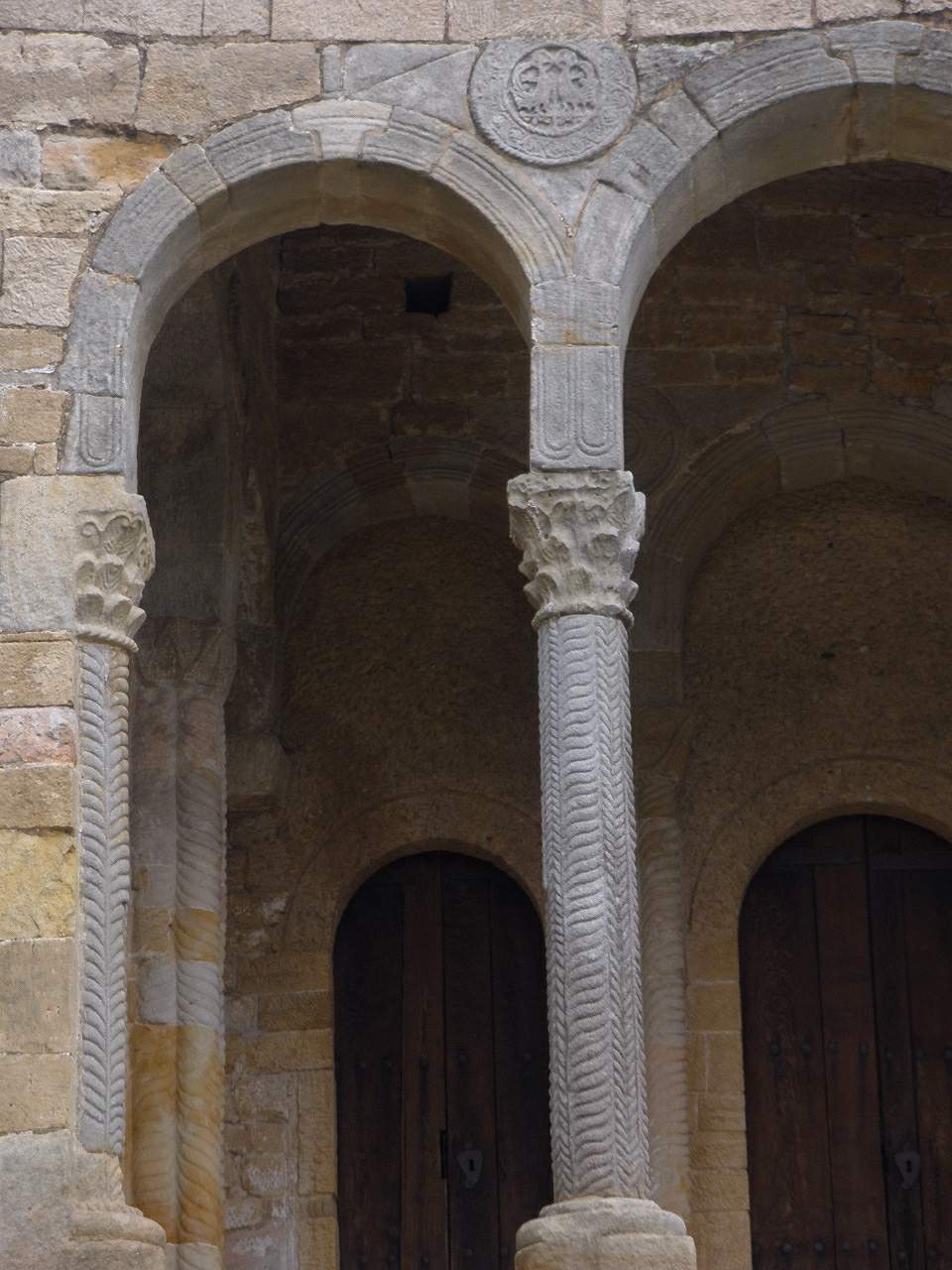
Detail of a window

== See also ==
- Asturian art
- Catholic Church in Spain
