= Historia silense =

Medieval Latin narrative history of the Iberian Peninsula

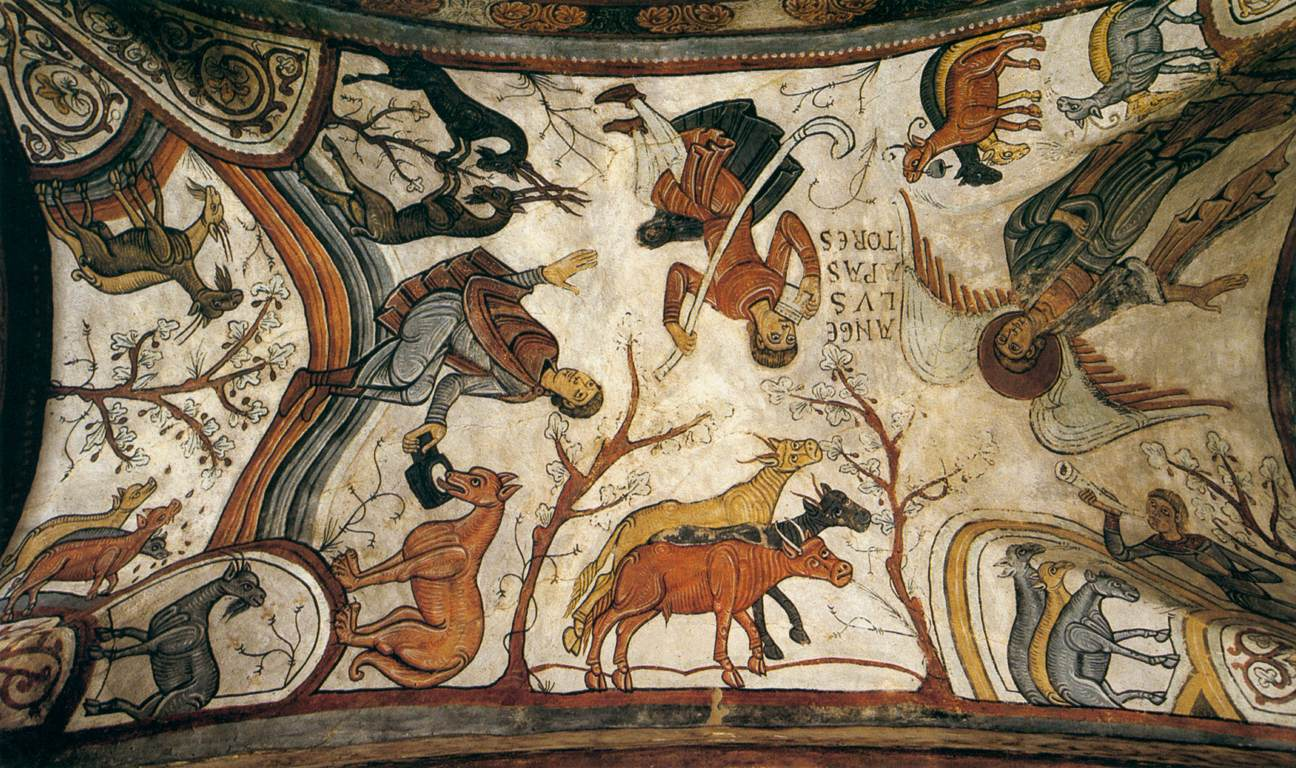
Annunciation of the Shepherds fresco of the 12th century in Pantheon of the Kings at Basilica of San Isidoro, León, where the Historia legionense may have been written.

The Historia silense, also called the Chronica silense or Historia seminense, and more properly Historia legionense, is a medieval Latin narrative history of the Iberian Peninsula from the time of the Visigoths (409–711) to the first years of the reign of Alfonso VI of León and Castile (1065–1073). Though originally intended as a gesta of Alfonso, it is primarily an original account of the reign of his father, Ferdinand I (1037–1065). For its earlier history it relies on the works of Isidore of Seville, Julian of Toledo, and the Vitas sanctorum patrum Emeritensium for the Visigothic period, the Chronicle of Alfonso III for the ninth century, the work of Sampiro for the tenth and early eleventh centuries, and the Chronicon of Pelayo of Oviedo for the eleventh century. The Historia along with Pelayo's Chronicon provide the only surviving versions of Sampiro's otherwise lost history.

== Dates of composition and manuscripts ==
The date of composition can be approximately fixed by internal evidence. In chapter 7 the author notes that "the whole length of [Alfonso VI's] fragile life has been run", indicating that he was writing after Alfonso's death in 1109. In chapter 13 there is a reference to the papal legate Cardinal Rainerius, who was holding a synod in León in 1090, later becoming Pope. Since Rainerius reigned as Paschal II from 1099 to January 1118 and there is no mention of his death, modern scholars have largely accepted that he was still alive at the time of composition. The anonymous historian was thus at work between 1109 and 1118. A date in the first third of the twelfth century also accords well with certain copyist's errors apparent in the surviving manuscripts that probably indicate that the original was set down in Visigothic script.

The Historia survives in eight known manuscripts. The earliest—1181 in the Biblioteca Nacional de España—dates from the latter half of the fifteenth century and is a copy of a copy of the original. Consequently, the text of the Historia is highly corrupted and the various critical editions contain numerous emendations. The first published edition was made by Francisco de Berganza for his Antigüedades de España in 1721. He relied on the now lost Fresdelval manuscript, supposedly from c.1500. Three copies of the Fresdelval survive, none earlier than c.1600.

== Authorship and provenance ==
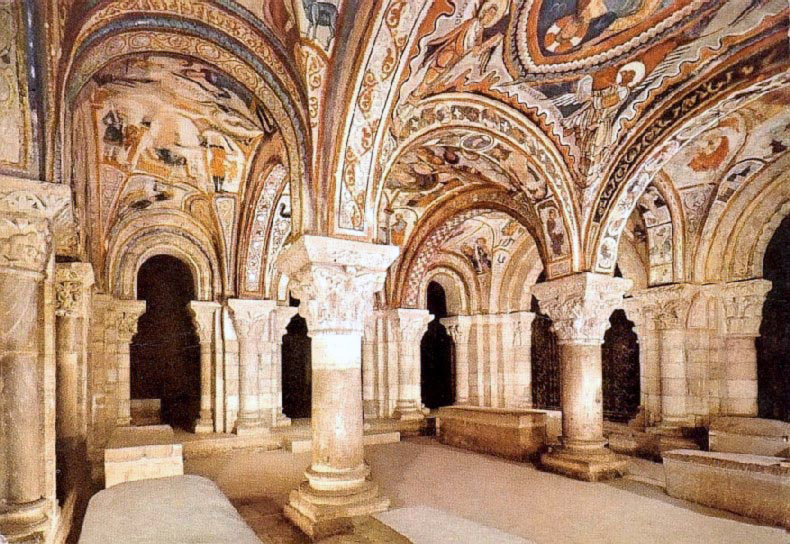
The Panteón de los Reyes at San Isidoro, where Ferdinand I and Alfonso VI were buried, and where the Historia silense may have been written.

The author of the Historia identifies himself as a monk of the domus seminis ("house of the seed"), long identified with Benedictine monastery of Santo Domingo de Silos in Castile, based on a marginal note in the Fresdelval manuscript that read "Santo Domingo de Silos". This position was strongly defended by historian Justo Pérez de Urbel, himself a monk of Silos. The author's lack of interest in Castilian matters and his ignorance of Castilian geography, as well as the complete absence of Silos from the Historia, suggest another monastery, probably in León. The term domus seminis may derive from a misunderstanding of the abbreviation dms scis, which could have stood for Domnis Sanctis ("at the lord saints'"). The monastery of Sahagún, the most important monastery in León during the reign of Ferdinand I and which maintained close ties with the royal court, was often known as Domnis Sanctis on account of its dual dedication to Facundus and Primitivus. While Sahagún is mentioned three times in the Historia and Alfonso VI was buried there, neither this burial nor the abbacy at Sahagún of Bernard de Sedirac (1080–85) are mentioned in places where they would be expected.

Another possible source for domus seminis was suggested in 1961 by the paleographer Manuel C. Díaz y Díaz. He suggested that it was a mistaken expansion of sci ihnis, in fact an abbreviation of sancti Iohannis, that is, Saint John's. A house in the city of León, with a community of monks dedicated to John the Baptist and one of nuns dedicated to Pelagius of Córdoba (San Pelayo), was founded in 965 by Sancho I of León and enjoyed royal patronage. Though it suffered several raids from Almanzor, it was restored by Alfonso V (999–1028) and patronised heavily by his daughter Sancha and her husband, Ferdinand I. In 1063 these monarchs had the relics of Isidore translated from Seville to Saint John's, which they refurbished and embellished. The house was thereafter known as San Isidoro de León (though the use of "Saints John and Isidore" for the male community is found in a diploma of Alfonso VI of 1099). The anonymous author, if sancti Iohannis was indeed his intention, may have sought to indicate that he became a monk at the monastery before 1063. He elsewhere refers to the church as hanc ecclesiam (this church), indicating perhaps his own locality and his intended audience (his brother monks).

The author is sometimes known as the Monk of Silos, despite that this identification has now been discredited. His purpose in writing he declares in the seventh chapter to describe "the deeds of the lord Alfonso, the orthodox emperor of Spain", that is, Alfonso VI. He also testifies to the "wisdom and goodness" of Urraca of Zamora, Alfonso's sister and ally, "more by experience than by report". Urraca was a noted patron of San Isidoro, where she was buried and where her donation of the Chalice of Doña Urraca survives to this day. Besides the Christian Bible, the author quotes liberally from Ovid, Virgil, and Gregory the Great, but his favourt authors are Sallust (the Bellum Catilinae and Bellum Iugurthinum) and Einhard (the Vita Karoli magni).

== Contents and structure ==
The surviving Historia is a preamble or introduction intended to provide the historical background to the (probably) unfinished Gesta Adefonsi. Pérez de Urbel divided it into chapters for his 1959 edition. The first six chapters describe the Visigothic kingdom and introduces the themes that will be developed in the rest of the work. The seventh chapter is a description of the author's purpose in writing, and it contains the most important clues to his identity. Chapters eight through thirteen narrate the opening of Alfonso VI's reign and his conflict with his brothers, Sancho II of Castile and García II of Galicia. The author mentions the death and burial of García in 1090 and then announces that he will "unravel the kingdom's origin" in the next chapters.

The text comes (mostly) in blocks of edited text taken from older historical works. The first block (chapters 14–38) is drawn from the Chronicle of Alfonso III, specifically the earlier 'Rotense version' found in the late-10th-century Códice de Roda. It covers the period from the reign of Wittiza (694–710) to that of Ordoño I (850–866). The second (chapters 39–47) narrates the reigns of Alfonso III, García I, and Ordoño II from 866 to 924. It ends in mid-sentence and may have been the original work of the "monk of Silos". The third is taken from Sampiro and corresponds with the first thirty chapters of his work (as numbered by Pérez de Urbel in his 1952 edition and not re-numbered by him in 1959). These chapters cover the years from 866 to the death of Alfonso V (1028), but differ from the preceding chapters with respect to the years up to 924. Sampiro's text, as incorporated into the Historia, shows little signs of editing and may have been a late addition or perhaps the later addition of a different compiler. The thirtieth and final chapter of Sampiro does show signs of editing (for which its English translators, Simon Barton and Richard A. Fletcher, numbered it 30*).

The monk resumes his original account after Sampiro with a chapter numbered 69. This chapter through 79 concerns the history of León between 956 and 1037 (and includes yet more overlap with the preceding chapters of Sampiro). Chapters 78 and 79 may quote from a now lost planctus of Vermudo III (died 1037, buried at San Isidoro). Chapter 74 provides background on the Kingdom of Navarre. The final section of the Historia (chapters 80–106) is a history of the reign of Ferdinand I, with an interpolated and edited version of the Translatio sancti Isidori (chapters 96–102), an account of the translation of Isidore's relics in 1063. The final two chapters (105–6) may also be derived from a now lost source describing Ferdinand's last days. The last recorded event in the Historia is the funeral of Ferdinand on 2 January 1066. Ferdinand's last days took place at San Isidoro.

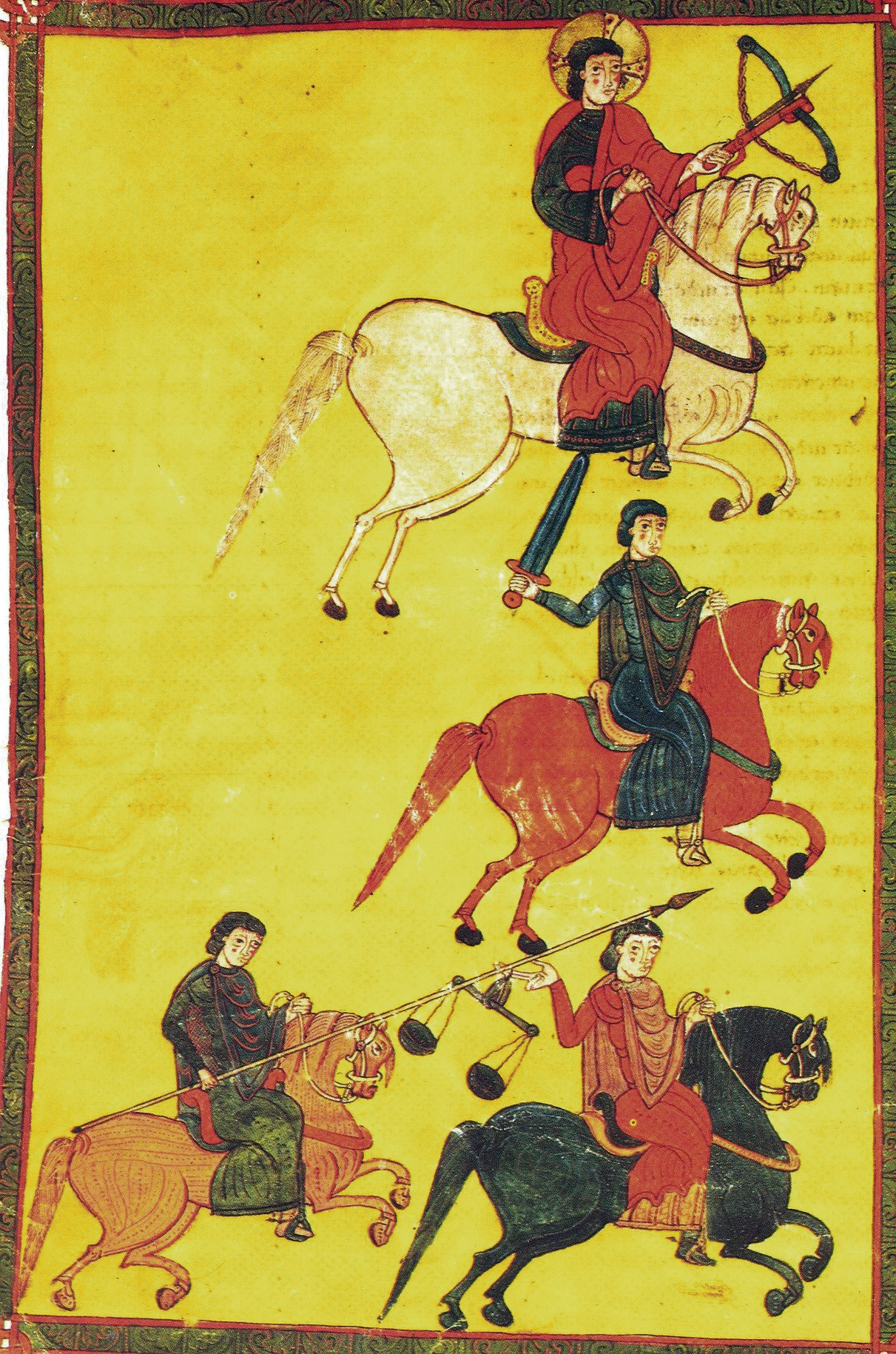
The Four Horsemen in a manuscript of Beatus of Osma's Commentary on the Apocalypse made in 1086, the same year as the battle of Sagrajas and probably depicting contemporary Spanish knights.

== Themes ==
Thematically, the Historia extols the Visigothic monarchy as the most orthodox in Christendom (more so even than the empire of Constantine) after its conversion in 589. The Leonese kingdom is called the Hispanie regnum (kingdom of Spain) and is presented as the legitimate successor to the Visigoths: the Leonese kings had been cleansed by punishment through the "barbarians" (Muslims). They redeem themselves in rescuing the churches from Muslim domination. Alfonso VI's championing of the Roman rite against the Mozarabic rite is held up as an example of orthodoxy. Genealogically the Leonese kings are of the stirps regalis Gotorum (royal stock of the Goths), an anachronism since the Gothic monarchy was elective. The Visigothic and Leonese kingdoms are consistently described in imperial terms. The "kingdom of the Cantabrians" (Navarre) is called a "province" and its kings are "noble" (not royal), while the Kingdom of Aragon is but a "little fragment" of the province of Navarre. It is possible that the consistent dismissal of Aragon had contemporary significance, since the author was writing at a time when the "emperor" Alfonso the Battler was devastating the lands around León, including some belonging to San Isidoro, in battles with the supporters of Alfonso VI's heiress, Urraca, who happened also to be Alfonso the Battler's wife.

The Historia also denigrates Frankish accomplishments in Spain. During the Visigothic period, it is claimed, they aided heretics and rebels against the orthodox Goths. Charlemagne's army, whom the French claimed had conquered parts of Spain, is compared to the French army that aided Alfonso VI in 1087 after the Battle of Sagrajas (1086). These soldiers, the allies of Alfonso's French queen, Constance of Burgundy, were paid handsomely in gold but left Spain having accomplished little against its newest Muslim invaders, the Almoravids. Charlemagne, too, according to the anonymous Historia, left Spain in ignominy, having been bribed to come in the first place. French aid to Aragon at the time of writing may have inspired or confirmed the author's anti-French sentiment.

== Purpose ==
The Historia may have been intended to reassure Spaniards that they would come through the live threat of war with Aragon and the Almoravid conquests in the same way they had come through the wars of Almanzor a century earlier and the Muslim conquests four centuries earlier. Christian Spain would be restored. It has been speculated that the Historia was designed as a Leonese "mirror for princes". Queen Urraca's son and heir, Alfonso VII (born 1105), was of the right age for receiving such instruction, but he spent his early years in Galicia, far from San Isidoro and the centre of the kingdom. Urraca's eldest daughter, Sancha Raimúndez (1095–1159), is a more likely candidate, as she was probably raised in León and was a lifelong patron of San Isidoro, where she received burial. Sancha was active during her brother's reign, as demonstrated by the Chronica Adefonsi imperatoris and the surviving charters. Perhaps, through her counsel, the Historia served to shape, in part, the reign of Alfonso VII.

An alternative interpretation of the Historia has been offered by medievalist John Wreglesworth. He suggests that it is a finished work "intended to be obliquely critical of Alfonso VI." This interpretation rests largely on a passage from the seventh chapter, which has been rendered in different ways:

Ubi diversis sententiis sanctorum patrum catholicorum regum, sacris idicentibus libris, mecum ipse diu spatiando revolvens.

There for a long time I ruminated in my own mind upon various opinions of the holy fathers proclaimed in the holy books of Catholic kings.

There I gave a lengthy consideration to the judgements of the holy Catholic fathers on the sacred Books of Kings.

The latter translation has the support not only of Wreglesworth but also of two Spanish translators: Manuel Gómez-Moreno and Jesús Evaristo Casariego. Wreglesworth interprets this passage as a reference to the "holy Catholic father" Isidore's commentary on the reign of Solomon. He sees parallels between Solomon (condemned for engaging foreign wives) and Alfonso (whose longest marriage was to the Frenchwoman, the aforementioned Constance, and who also had a relationship with a Muslim, Zaida of Seville). Alfonso's father, Ferdinand, like Solomon's father, David, was a paragon of kingly virtue (in the eyes of the historian's monastic author).
