= Nepotian of Asturias =

Nepotian

King of Asturias
- Reign: 842–842
- Predecessor: Alfonso II
- Successor: Ramiro I
- Dynasty: Astur-Leonese dynasty

Nepotian (Latin: Nepotianus; Spanish: Nepociano) was briefly the king of Asturias in 842. Prior to that, he served as count of the palace under his predecessor, Alfonso II, to whom he may have been related. Both the nature of this relationship and the legitimacy of his rule are disputed by historians.

When Alfonso II died in 842, his chosen successor, Ramiro I, was in Bardulia, where he was to marry a woman named Paterna. In Ramiro's absence, Nepotian, with the support of some members the nobility, usurped the throne illegitimately. Upon learning of Nepotian's usurpation, Ramiro gathered an army and began his journey back to Asturias. In the midst of Ramiro's return, Nepotian and his army composed of Asturians and Basques ambushed him near a bridge that crossed the Narcea river. However, Nepotian was abandoned by his army and he was forced to flee. He was captured in Pravia by two counts referred to as Escipion and Somnan; as punishment for his transgressions, he was blinded by Ramiro and imprisoned in a monastery.

Nepotian's connection to Alfonso II is not certain. Later sources refer to him as Alfonso's brother-in-law, but this is chronologically implausible, nor is there evidence for such a sister. The earliest chronicle simply calls him Alfonso's kinsman. Likewise, he is sometimes identified as a man also named Nepotian who appears in a charter of King Silo, but if these men were the same, he would have been in his nineties when he usurped the throne.

| Preceded by Alfonso II | King of Asturias; 842 | Succeeded by Ramiro I |
