= Narcea (river) =

River of Asturias, Spain

Coordinates: 43.466667°N 6.116667°W

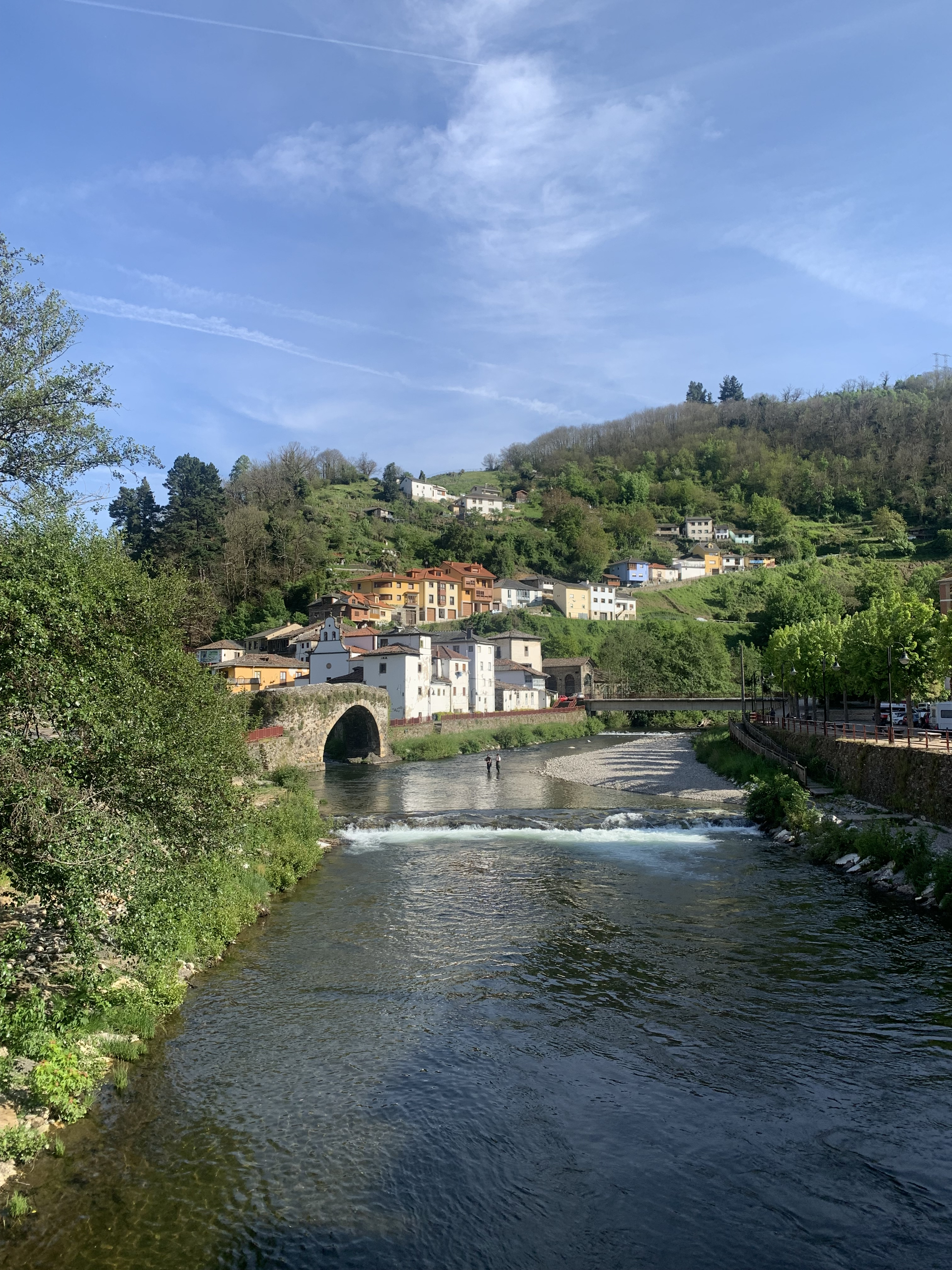
- The river Narcea in Cangas del Narcea

Location
- Country: Spain
- Region: Asturias

Physical characteristics
- Length: 123 km (76 mi)

The Narcea is a river in Asturias. It is a tributary of the Nalón River, starting about 5 km east of the parish of Monasterio de Hermo and meeting the Nalón near the municipality of Pravia. The river spans 123 km and is the second longest in Asturias, following only the Nalón itself. The river is host to multiple salmon preserves, and is additionally inhabited by the endangered Cantabrian brown bear.

In 842, the river was the site of the medieval battle between Nepotian and Ramiro I after the former had usurped the throne of Asturias. Nepotian and his army composed of Asturians and Basques ambushed Ramiro's army at the river; as a result of the ensuing battle, the defeated Nepotian was imprisoned and blinded, and Ramiro was crowned King of Asturias.
