= Bardulia =

Ancient name for territories in northern Spain

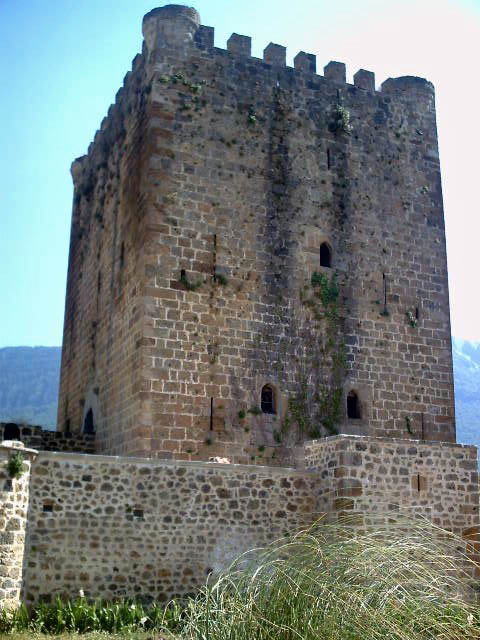
Medieval tower of the Velascos in Lezana de Mena (near present-day Valle de Mena, in historic Bardulia.

According to some sources, Bardulia is the ancient name of the territories that composed the primitive Castile in the north of what later became the province of Burgos. The name comes from Varduli, the name of a tribe who, in pre-Roman and Roman times, populated the eastern part of the Cantabrian coast of the Iberian Peninsula, primarily in present-day Guipúzcoa. Some assert that the Varduli also encompassed or assimilated the Caristii and Autrigones.

It has been speculated that a possible expansion of the Basque territories—Late Basquisation, an expansion to the Basque Country in the 6th through 8th centuries—occasioned a westward migration of the Varduli to what the documents of the Low Middle Ages call Bardulia.

== Bardulia and Castile ==
The first written mention of Bardulia is a 10th-century chronicle that describes it as a former name for Castile. The Chronicle of Alfonso III, written in Latin, uses the term four times, in various declensions. Similar passages recur in the texts of later chroniclers.

There are two variants of the Chronicle of Alfonso III. Among the passages there are "Bardulies qui (quae) nunc uocitatur (appellatur) Castella" ("Bardulia, which is now called Castella") and "Barduliensem provintiam" ("the Bardulian Province") where King Ramiro I of Asturias was traveling to take a wife, and where he heard of the death of his predecessor Alfonso II.

The early 12th-century Historia Silense says of Ramiro I: "cum Bardulies, quae nunc Castella vocatur, ad accipiendan uxorem accederet." The 12th-century Chronica Naierensis and the forged donation to the bishops of Lugo and Oviedo (11th-12th century) also refer to Bardulia.

In the first half of the 13th century, Lucas de Tuy twice mentions Bardulia, as does Rodrigo Jiménez de Rada, in an allusion to Ramiro, that on the death of Alfonso II, "in Bardulia pro accipienda uxore aliquandiu fecit moram" ("he stayed some time in Bardulia to take a wife"). In another place Jiménez de Rada closely parallels the Chronicle of Alfonso III: "nobiles Barduliae, quae nunc Castella dicitur" ("nobles of Bardulia, which is now called Castile").

The first Crónica General of Alfonso el Sabio, basically a compilation of earlier chronicles, makes four mentions of Bardulia, and the Annales Compostellani, says that Albutaman (probably Abu-Otman, a distinguished general of Hisham I of Córdoba) died in 844 (Spanish era; 806 AD), in Pisuerga, "quando venit in Bardulias" ("when he arrived in Bardulia").

Addressing the claim that Bardulia was simply a scholarly term, the 20th century medievalist and statesman Claudio Sánchez-Albornoz y Menduiña defends Alfonso III from the charge of a scholarly error in equating Bardulia with early Castile, but his words leave the matter somewhat open: "It is very probable that Alfonso III did not commit a error of erudition in identifying Bardulia with Castile," and that "If there was an error in the identification of Bardulia with Castile, that error propagates from Castile itself in the 9th century, which is hard to reconcile with it being of [later] erudite origin.
