= Monte Naranco =

Mountain in Oviedo, Spain

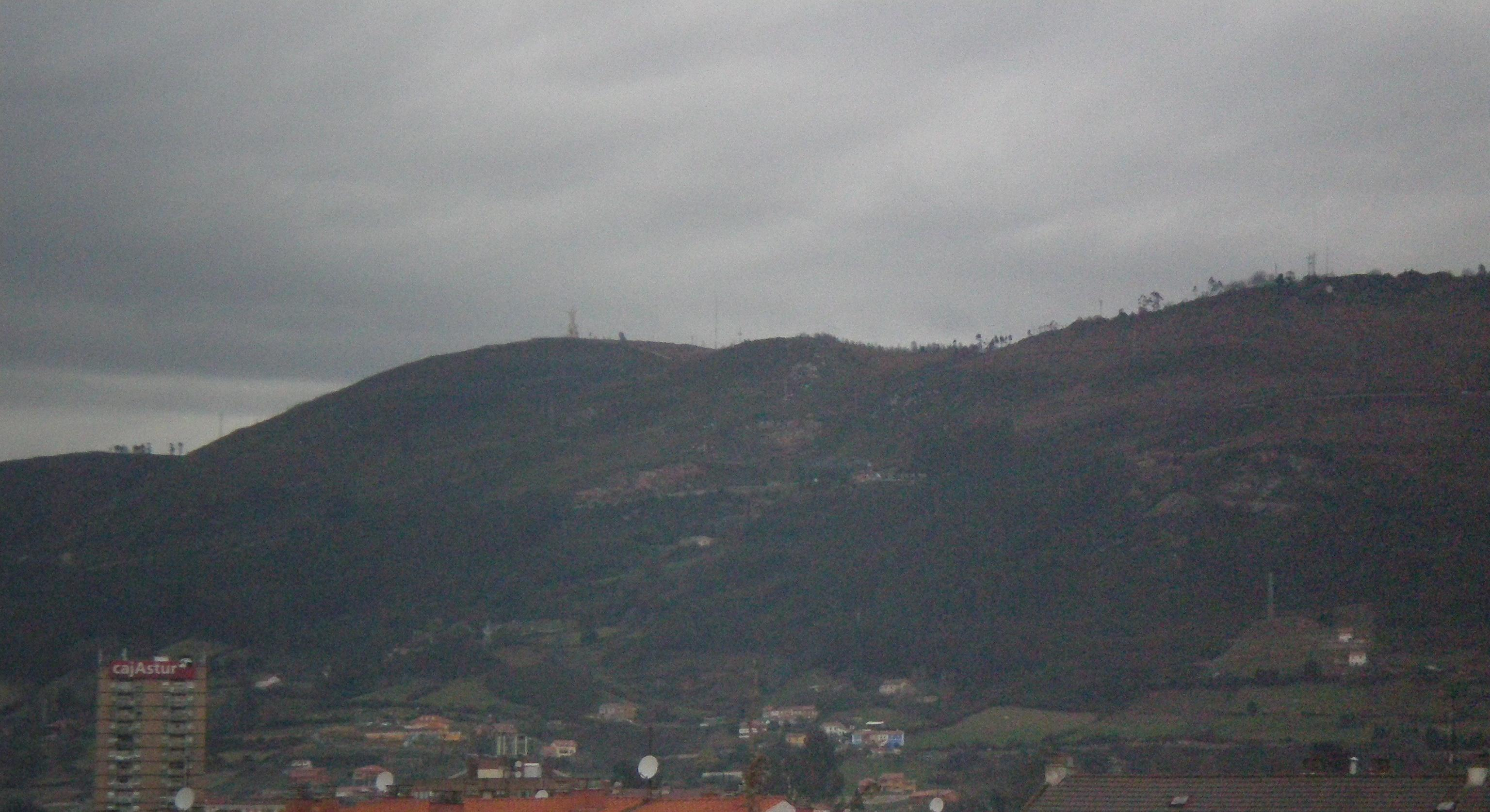

Highest point
- Elevation: 634 m (2,080 ft)
- Coordinates: 43°23′N 05°52′W

Naming
- Language of name: Spanish

Geography
- Location within Spain
- Location: Oviedo, Spain
- Parent range: Sierra del Naranco

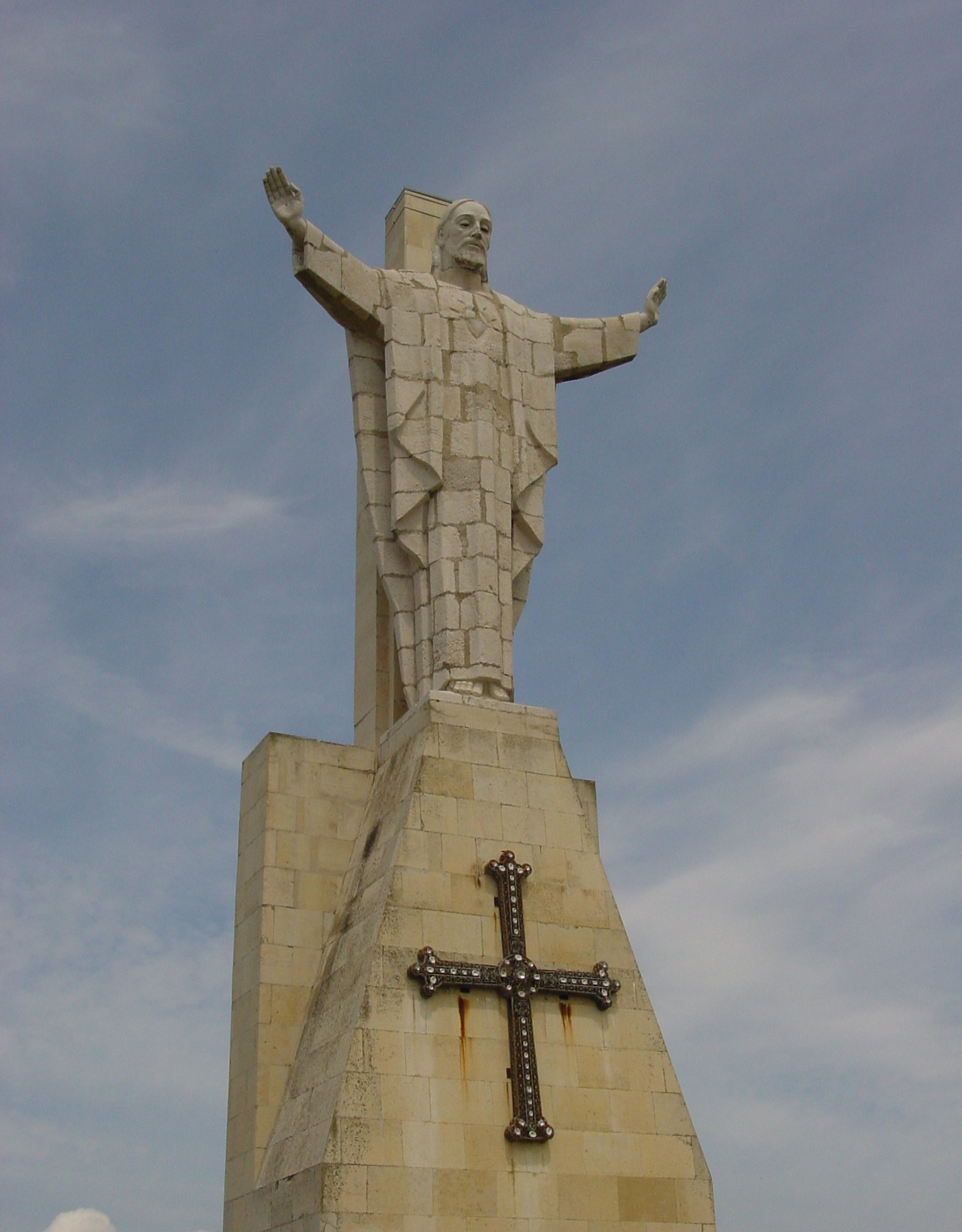
El Cristo del Naranco, a statue at the top of the mountain

Monte Naranco is a mountain in Oviedo, Spain. The church Santa María del Naranco is situated on its slopes. It is also known as the finishing line for the bicycle races Subida al Naranco and Vuelta a España.
