= Chronicle of Alfonso III =

Medieval text

The Chronicle of Alfonso III (Latin: Chronica Adefonsi tertii regis) is a chronicle composed in the early tenth century on the order of King Alfonso III of León with the goal of showing the continuity between Visigothic Spain and the later Christian medieval Spain. Intended as a continuation of Isidore of Seville's history of the Goths, it is written in a late form of Latin and outlines a history of the period from the Visigothic King Wamba through that of King Ordoño I. The Chronicle exists in two somewhat different recensions: the earlier Cronica Rotensis, and the later Cronica ad Sebastianum, which includes additional details furthering the ideological goals of the chronicle.
