= Iglesia de San Pedro =

Iglesia de San Pedro may refer to:

- Iglesia de San Pedro (Alles), a church in Asturias, Spain
- Iglesia de San Pedro (Con), a church in Asturias, Spain
- Iglesia de San Pedro (Ese de Calleras), a church in Asturias, Spain
- Iglesia de San Pedro (Huasco), a church in the Atacama Region, Chile
- Iglesia de San Pedro (La Felguera)
- Iglesia de San Pedro (Mestas de Con), a church in Asturias, Spain
- Iglesia de San Pedro (Pola de Siero), a church in Asturias, Spain
- Church of San Pedro, Puebla, a church in Puebla, Mexico
