= Riera =

Riera may refer to:

== People ==
- Albert Riera (b. 1982), Spanish retired footballer
- Arnau Riera (b. 1981), Spanish retired footballer
- Carme Riera (b. 1948), Spanish novelist and essayist
- Fernando Riera (1920 - 2010), Chilean former football player and manager
- Gabi Riera, Andorran football player
- Joan Sansó Riera (b. 2000), Spanish para-cyclist
- Joaquin Riera (b. 1994), Argentine rugby player
- Julia Riera (b. 2002), Argentine tennis player
- Marieta Riera (b. 1963), Venezuelan former athlete who specialised in the javelin throw
- Micaela Riera (b. 1991), Argentine actress
- Nicolás Riera (b. 1985), Argentine actor
- Oriol Riera (b. 1986), Spanish former footballer and current assistant manager
- Rodrigo Riera (1923 – 1999), Venezuelan guitarist and composer
- Sito Riera (b. 1987), Spanish footballer
- Teresa Riera (b. 1950), Spanish politician and Member of the European Parliament

== Places ==
- La Riera, Cangas de Onís, in Asturias, Spain
- La Riera de Gaià, in Catalonia
- La Riera (Colunga), in Asturias, Spain
- Sa Riera, in Catalonia

== Other ==
- Palacio del Marqués de Casa Riera, a former palace in Madrid
