= Benjamina Miyar =

Spanish photographer, watchmaker, anti-fascist resistance member (1888–1961)

Benjamina Miyar Díaz
- Born: 9 August 1888; Cangas de Onís, Spain
- Died: 7 August 1961 (aged 72); Cangas de Onís, Spain
- Occupations: photographer, watchmaker
- Known for: Anti-Franco and anti-fascist resistance

Benjamina Miyar Díaz of Corao, Cangas de Onís, Spain, (9 August 1888 – 7 August 1961) was a professional photographer, watchmaker and member of the Spanish anti-fascist resistance causing her to be imprisoned four times between 1938 and 1950. Her life became the subject of a 2020 documentary.

== Biography ==
Benjamina Miyar was the daughter of María Manuela Díaz Montero and Roberto Miyar Álvarez, a Marxist and bohemian watchmaker in Corao, Spain. Descended from a family of booksellers and watchmakers, her father was a cousin of Basilio Sobrecueva Miyar, founder of the Corao watch factory and also related to the liberal bookseller Antonio Miyar. Benjamina's childhood combined detailed manual work as well as literature and art. The family lived on an estate called Calle l'Agua, where her cousins also lived. She studied at the Corao girls' school.

=== Career path ===
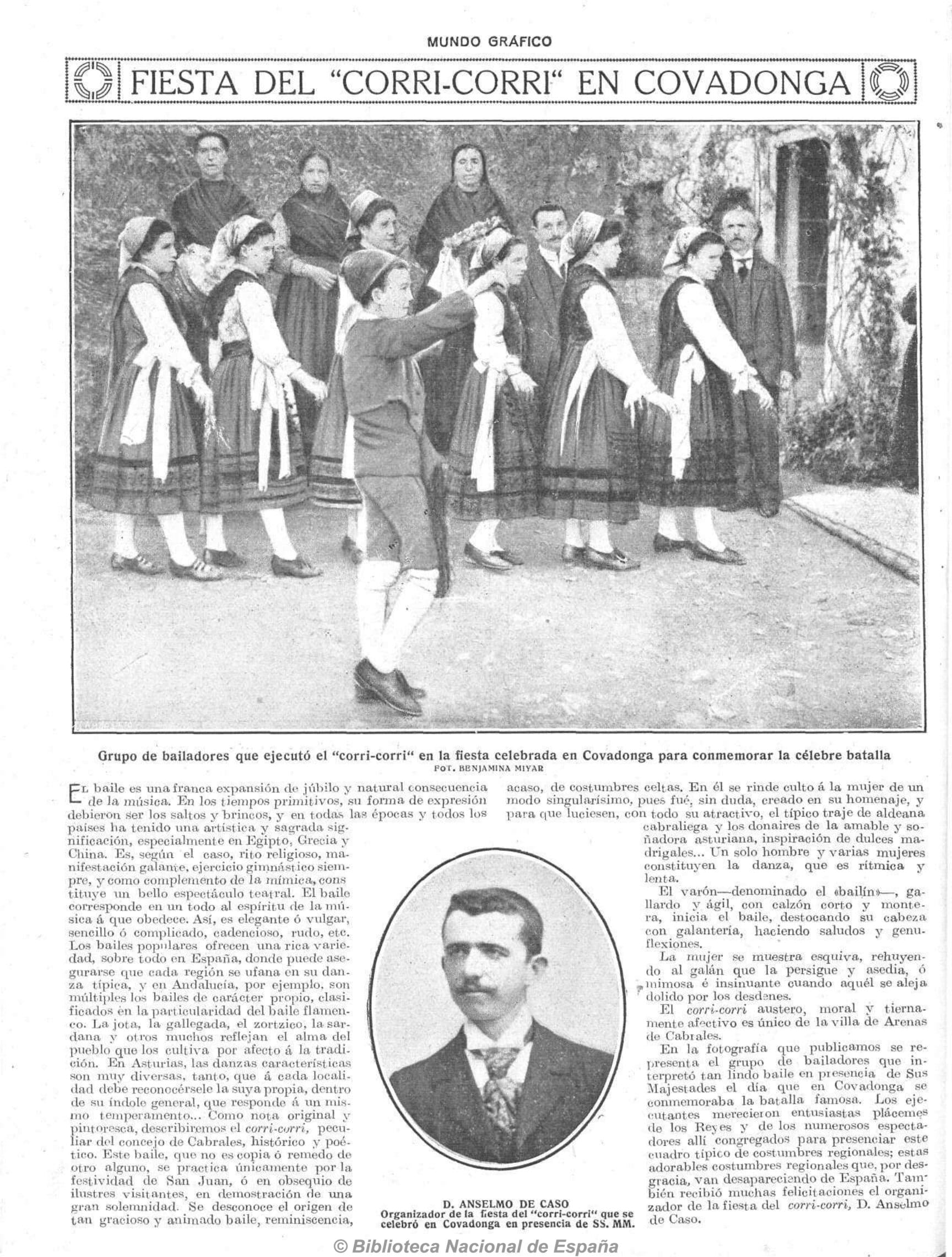
Cori-cori dancers photographed by Miyar and published in 1918.

As a young girl, she began working in her father's workshop, making and repairing clocks. At the same time, she became a self-taught photographer “by reading magazines,” opening her own studio next to the watchmaking workshop. According to Pantín Fernández,

"In a small room on the ground floor of Corao's house, she set up her studio, where she developed hundreds of photographs of the life and inhabitants of the region for decades, making photography her livelihood."

Her photographic work appeared in various regional press media. There is evidence of her first portrait published in 1914, the portrait of Antón Santos in The Perexilu. In 1918, the magazine Mundo Gráfico published a photograph of the corri-corri dancers signed by Miyar, and that same year, two other media outlets from Cangas de Onís, El Popular and El Orden, published very brief notices of her first photographic work, praising her excellent skills.

It was in portrait photography that Miyar best expressed her artistic vision, played with compositions and created a story. Her work included postcard positives recreating traditional roles in apparently improvised settings. After developing a print, she added a few touch-ups with colored pencils or pen and ink to these works. Through these photographs, Miyar explored her immediate world and preserved it, but when she died, some of her work was lost.

=== Civil War and postwar period ===
With the Spanish Civil War in 1936, Miyar became a member of the anti-fascist resistance, a republican. When national troops entered Corao, she guarded her father's workshop to prevent looting by the soldiers.

Secretly, she was involved with guerrilla groups, maquis, and documented some of their encounters. She was a liaison and resistance agent in the Asturian forests. She was imprisoned four times and beaten repeatedly for “aiding bandits, possession of weapons and photographs.” One of the charges against her was terrorism for her relationship with the anti-fascist guerrillas. In the book La brigadilla, José Ramón Gómez-Fouz comments that Miyar is the author of a photograph in which fellow rebels appear, but before this photograph was developed, she was arrested. The protection she offered to Fernando Prieto Moro, Alegría, is documented. Until 1945 she remained a fugitive hiding in the mountains near Corao, and her house was searched on several occasions by dictator Francisco Franco's Civil Guard. After the guerrillas were defeated in the 1950s, Miyar was allowed to return to her watchmaking workshop and photography studio to earn a living although she remained very poor. After her cousin Ismael, a political resister, returned home after serving six years in Franco's prison, she handed over the watchmaking workshop to him, devoting herself solely to photography, which she never abandoned.

She battled cancer for years, first moving to Palencia, then to Madrid for treatment, and returning to Corao shortly before her death on 7 August 1961. After she died, "most of her negatives were thrown into the river" and her life was largely forgotten until the 2020 documentary was released.

== Legacy ==
In 2020, the documentary La calle del agua by Celia Viada Caso was released in which Celia Viada Caso, the director, in her first feature film, recounts Miyar's life and work. She received the OpenEcam Work-in-progress award at the 2019 Gijón International Film Festival (FICX 2019) and seven more prizes at FICX 2020 including Best Director, Audience and Best Screenplay Awards.
