= Iglesia de San Pedro (Mestas de Con) =

Coordinates: 43°20′18″N 5°00′56″W

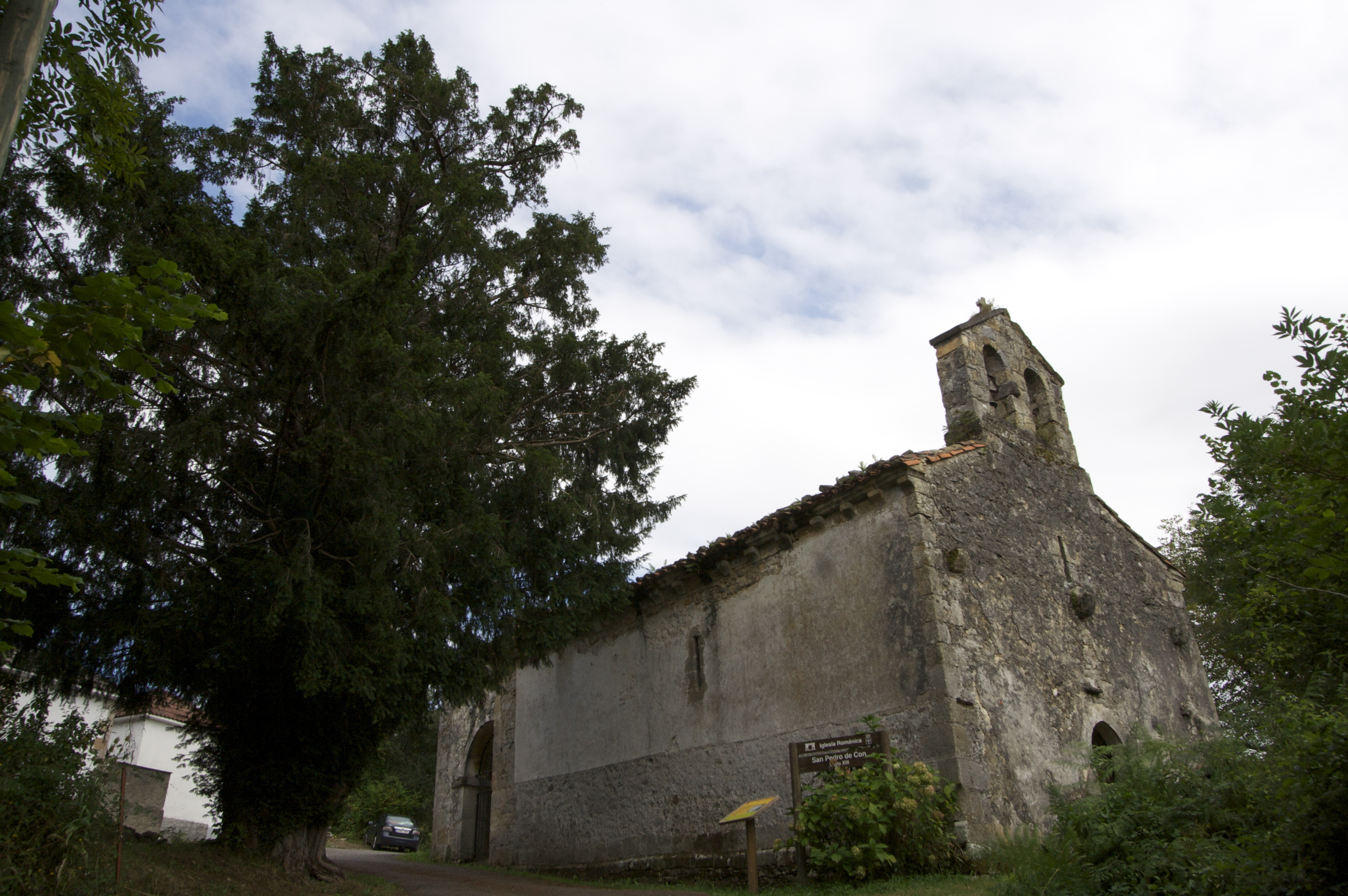
- Iglesia de San Pedro (Mestas de Con)
- Location: Asturias, Spain

San Pedro is a Romanesque-style Roman Catholic church in the Mestas de Con neighborhood of Cangas de Onís, in the community of Asturias, Spain.

== See also ==
- Asturian art
- Catholic Church in Spain
