= Pernús =

- Parish
- Location within Spain
- Coordinates: 43.483333°N 5.316667°W
- Country: Spain
- Autonomous community: Asturias
- Province: Asturias
- Municipality: Colunga

Pernús is one of 13 parishes (administrative divisions) in the Colunga municipality, within the province and autonomous community of Asturias, in northern Spain.

It is located at (43.480047, -5.324792).

The population is 97 (INE 2007).

== Villages ==
- Beldréu
- El Conyéu
- Pernús
