= Colunga =

- Municipality
- Flag Coat of arms

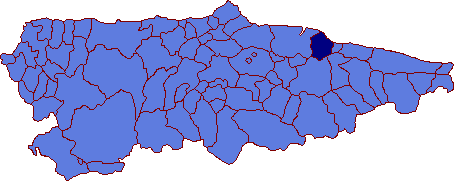

- Location in Spain
- Coordinates: 43°29′10″N 5°16′13″W
- Country: Spain
- Autonomous community: Asturias
- Province: Asturias
- Comarca: Oriente
- Judicial district: Villaviciosa
- Capital: Colunga

Government
  - Alcalde: José Rogelio Pando (PSOE)

Area
  - Total: 97.57 km^{2} (37.67 sq mi)
- Highest elevation: 1,159 m (3,802 ft)

Population (2025-01-01)
  - Total: 3,143
  - Density: 32.21/km^{2} (83.43/sq mi)
- Demonym: colungués / colunguesa
- Time zone: UTC+1 (CET)
  - Summer (DST): UTC+2 (CEST)
- Postal code: 33320 - 33340
- Website: Official website

Colunga (Spanish pronunciation: [koˈluŋɡa]) is a municipality in the Autonomous community of the Principality of Asturias, Spain. It lies on the Cantabrian Sea, and is bordered to the west by Villaviciosa, to the south by Parres and Piloña, and to the east by Caravia.

== Politics ==
Elecciones municipales
Partido	1979	1983	1987	1991	1995	1999	2003	2007	2011	2015
PSOE		4	4	3	5	3	4	6	6	6
CD / AP / PP	4	4	5	7	6	6	4	5	3	4
FAC									2	1
PCE / IU-BA / IU-The Greens			2	1		1	1	0	0	0
UCD / CDS	6	5	2	0			2			
Agrupación Independiente por Colunga				2						
Electores por Colunga					2					
URAS / URAS-PAS						1	0	0		
Independents	3									
Total	13	13	13	13	13	11	11	11	11	11

== Parishes ==
- Carrandi
- Colunga
- Gobiendes
- La Isla
- La Llera
- La Riera
- Llastres
- Lliberdón
- Llue
- Pernús
- Pivierda
- Sales
- San Xuan de Duz

=== Parish of Colunga ===
The capital of the municipality is the parish with the same name. Its population is 1,132 (INE 2007) and it is divided in five villages: Cimavilla, El Ferreru, Friera, Loreto and El Sorriberu.

== Demography ==
Quelle: Instituto Nacional de Estadística de España - grafische Aufarbeitung für Wikipedia

== Anchovy beaching incident ==
On September 29, 2006, millions of anchovies, constituting a weight of over three tons, beached themselves near Colunga. Tests on the dead fish did not detect any toxic chemical that could have caused the beaching, and the current working theory is that the shoal beached itself trying to escape from "hungry dolphins or tuna." If the beached specimens had grown to maturity, it would have been more than "100 tons of potential breeders."

== Gallery ==
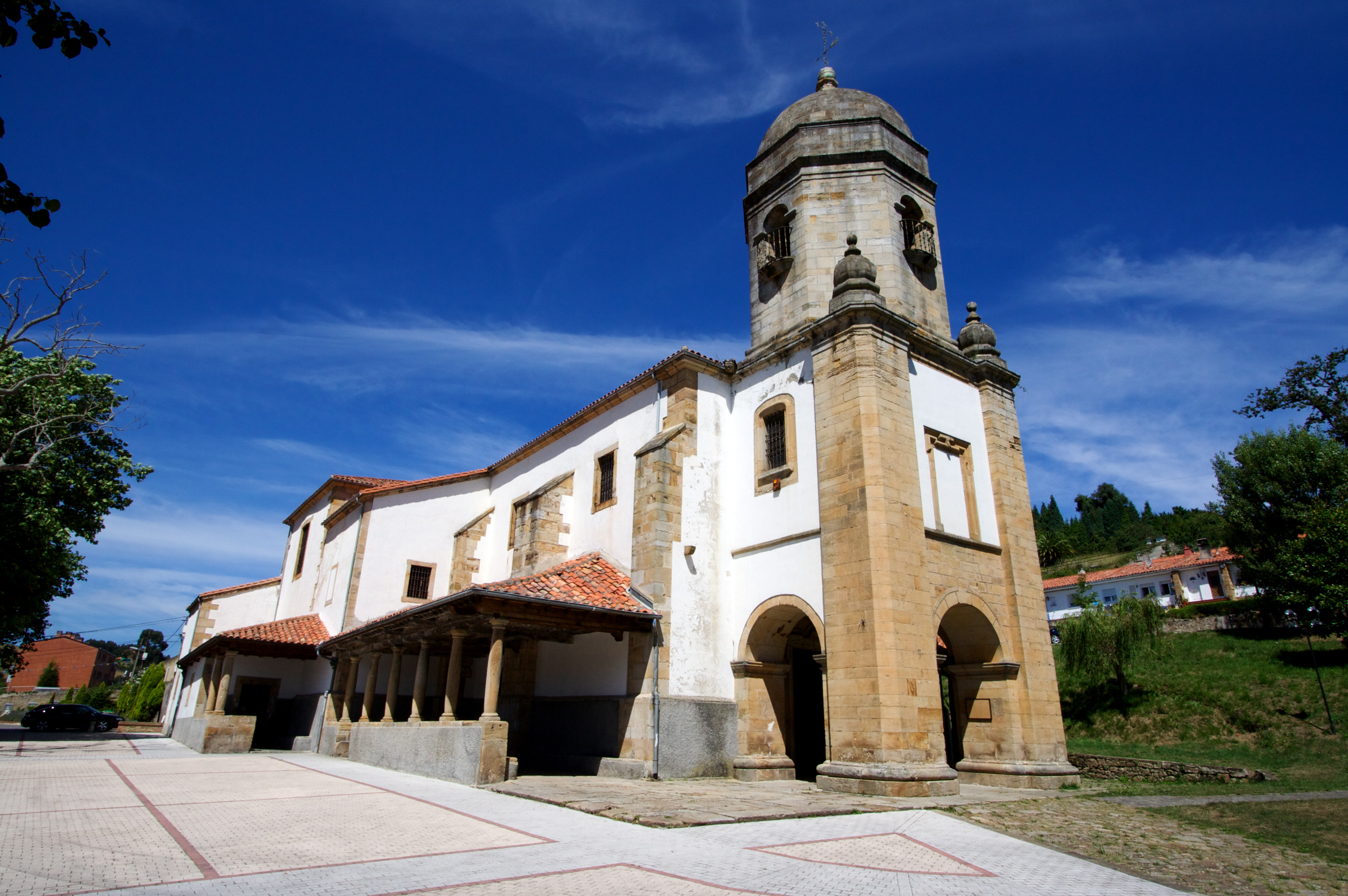
Church of Santa María de Sabada

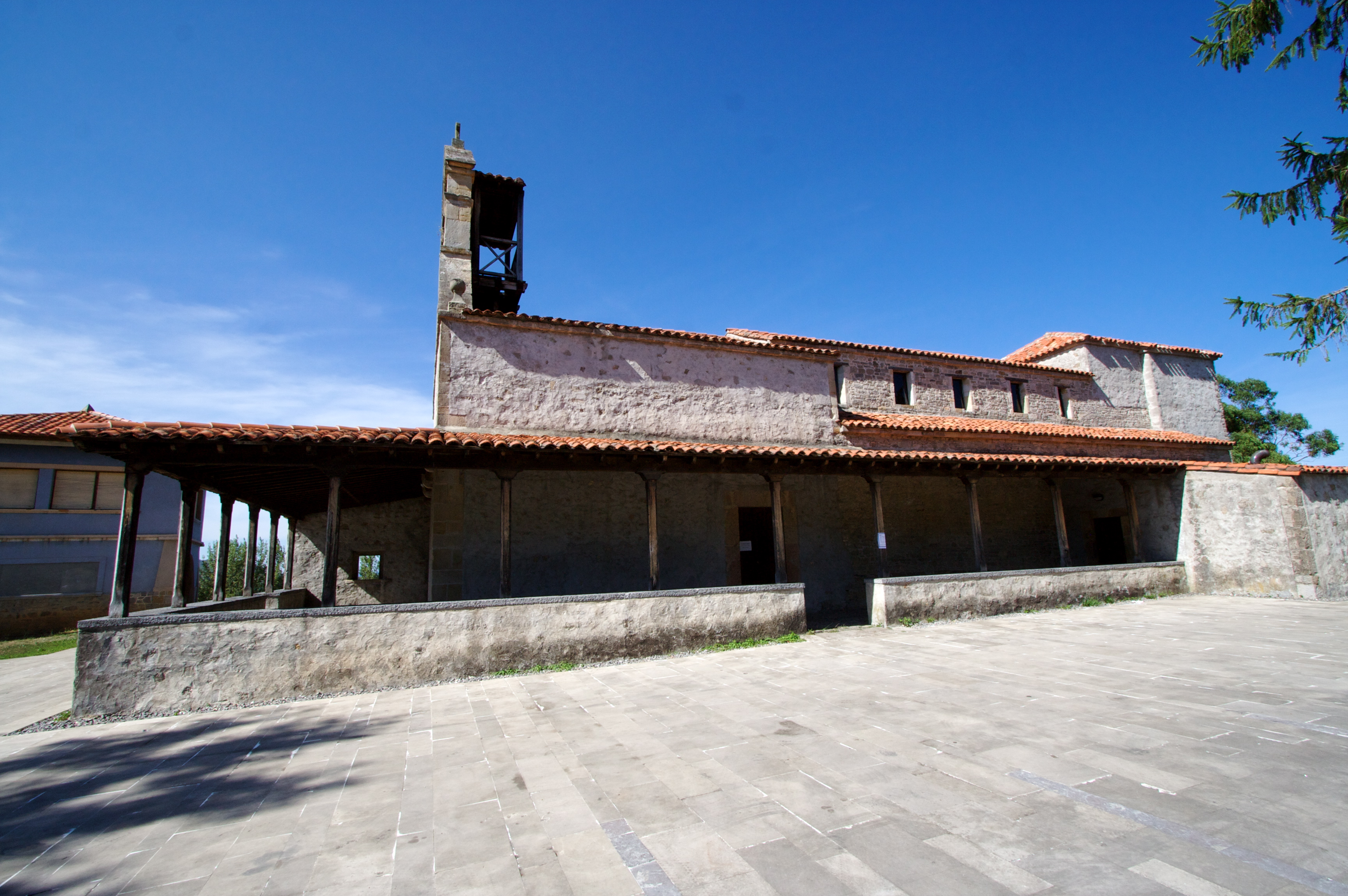
Pre-Romanesque Church of Santiago de Gobiendes

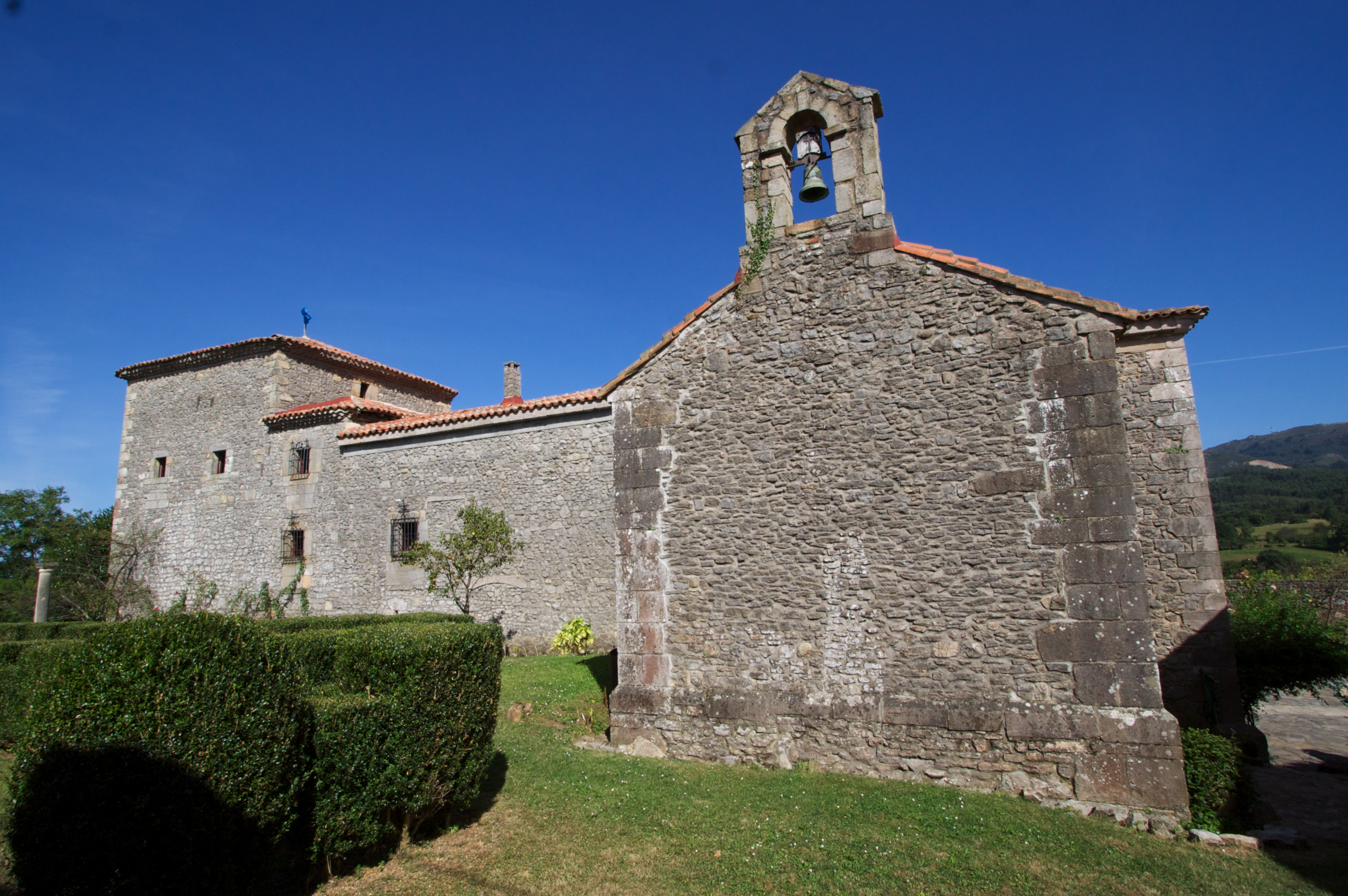
Palace of Gobiendes

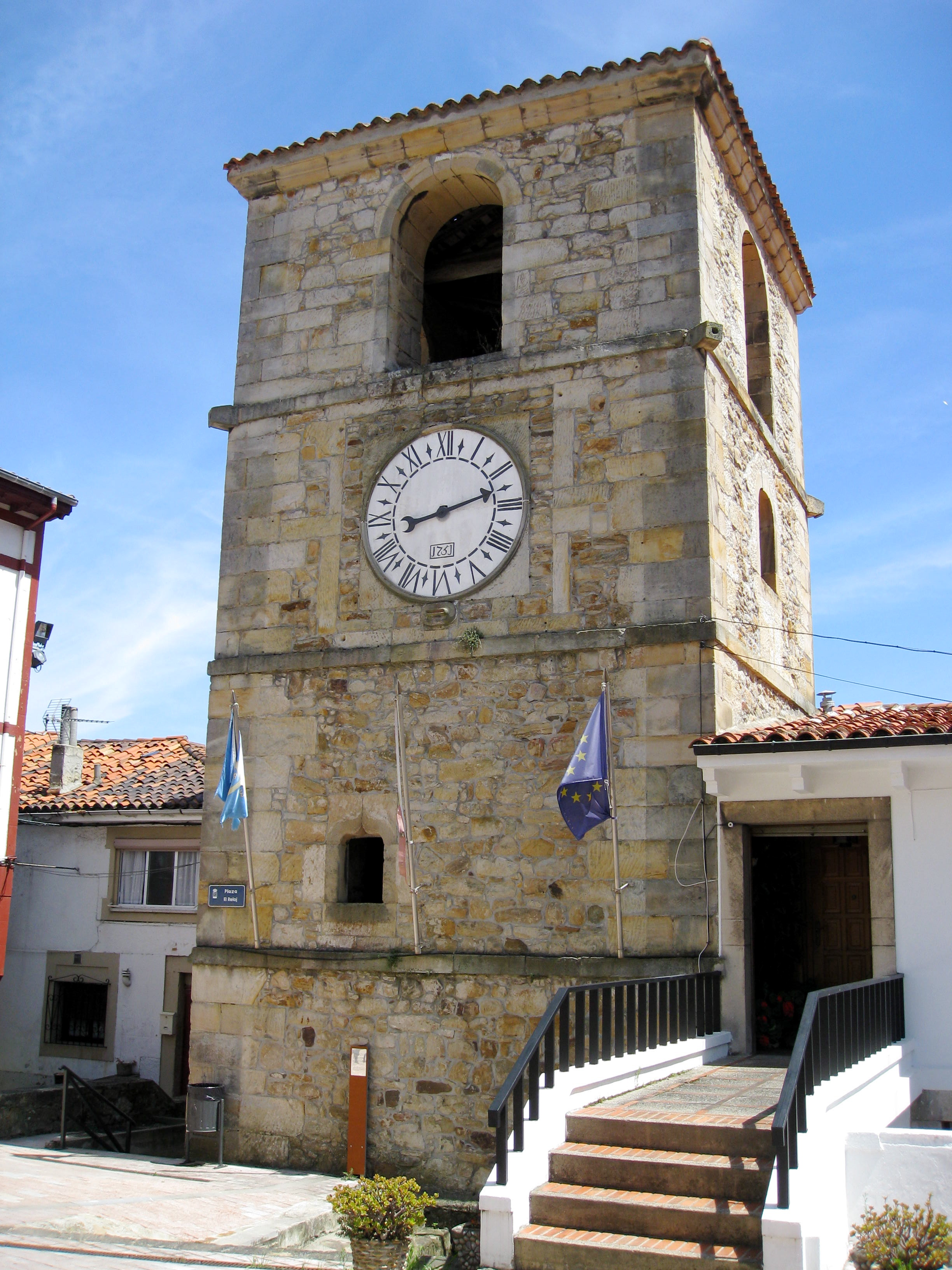
Clock tower in Lastres, Colunga

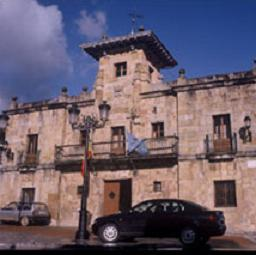
Colunga's Town Hall

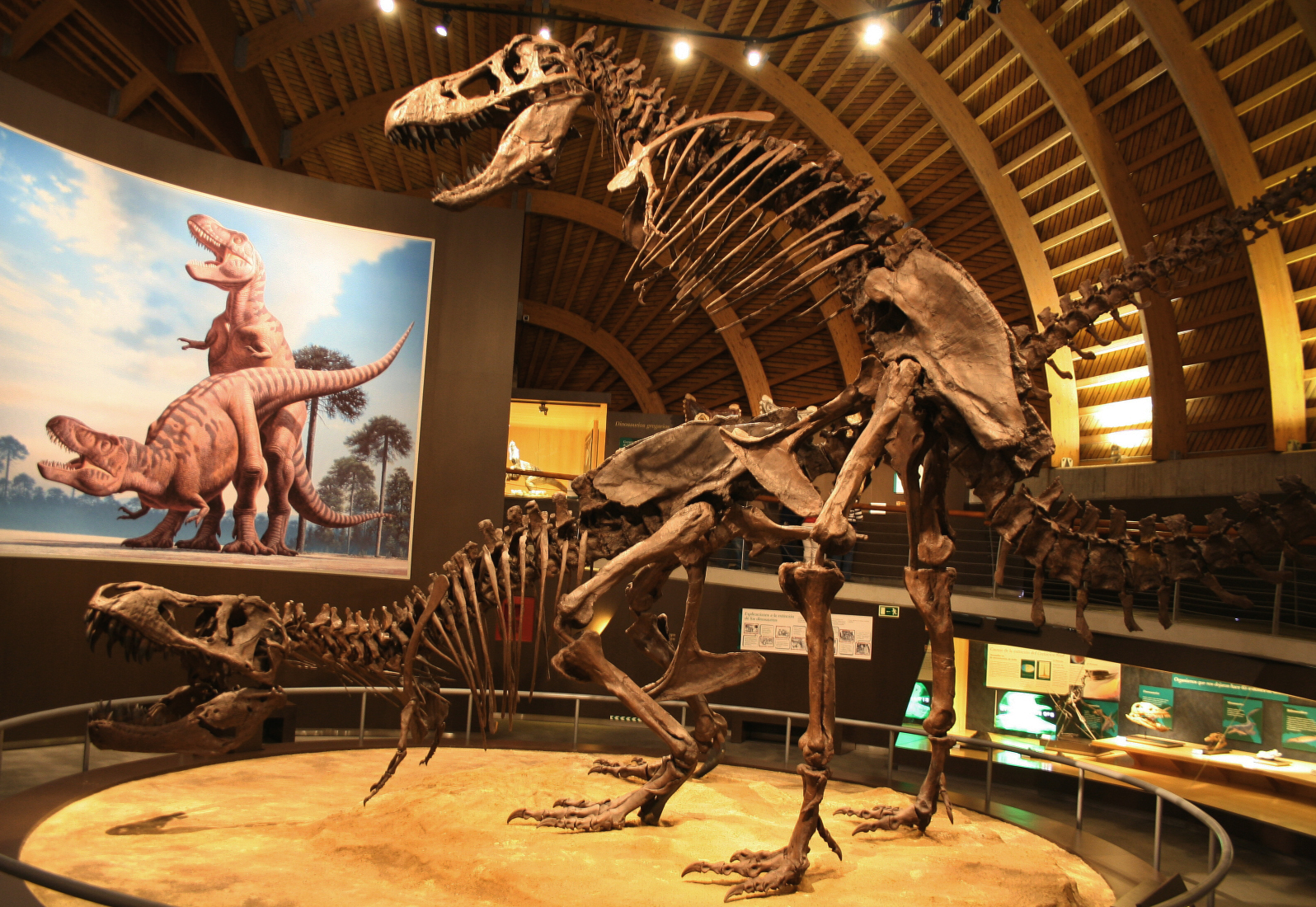
Jurassic Museum of Asturias

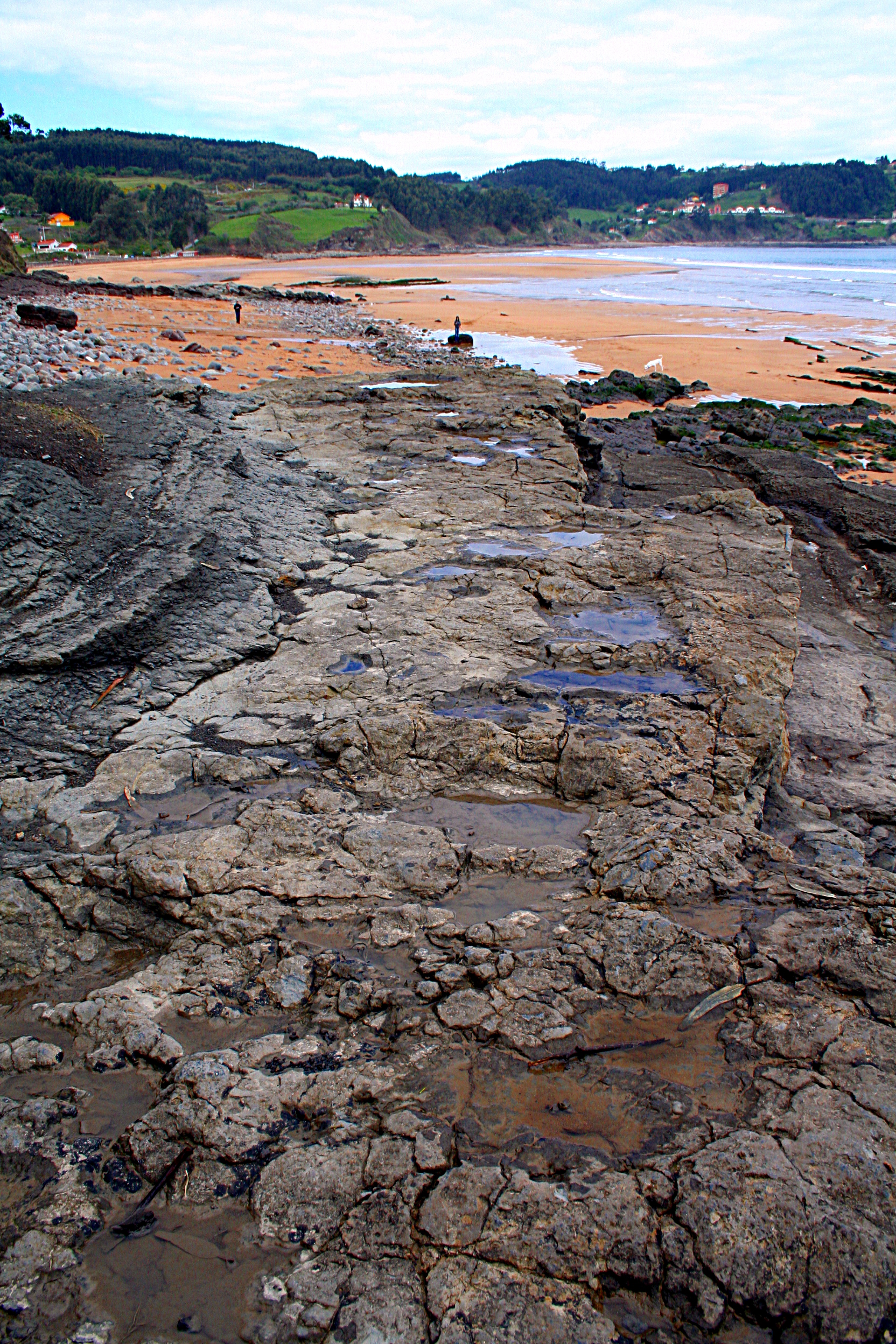
The Dinosaur Coast

== See also ==
- List of municipalities in Asturias
