= Carrandi =

- Parish
- Location within Spain
- Coordinates: 43.466667°N 5.266667°W
- Country: Spain
- Autonomous community: Asturias
- Province: Asturias
- Municipality: Colunga

Carrandi is one of 13 parishes (administrative divisions) in the Colunga municipality, within the province and autonomous community of Asturias, in northern Spain.

== Landmarks ==
Parish church of Santa Úrsula, constructed in the 20th century, and the Cultural Club, which was established with funds from emigrants who returned from the Americas.
