= Lliberdón =

- Parish
- Location within Spain
- Coordinates: 43.433333°N 5.3°W
- Country: Spain
- Autonomous community: Asturias
- Province: Asturias
- Municipality: Colunga

Lliberdón is one of 13 parishes (administrative divisions) in the Colunga municipality, within the province and autonomous community of Asturias, in northern Spain.

The population is 232 (INE 2004).

== Villages ==
- Carrandena
- L'Esllavayu
- Fanu
- Lliberdón
- Raicéu
