= Cangas de Onís =

Cangas de Onís Cangues d'Onís
- Municipality
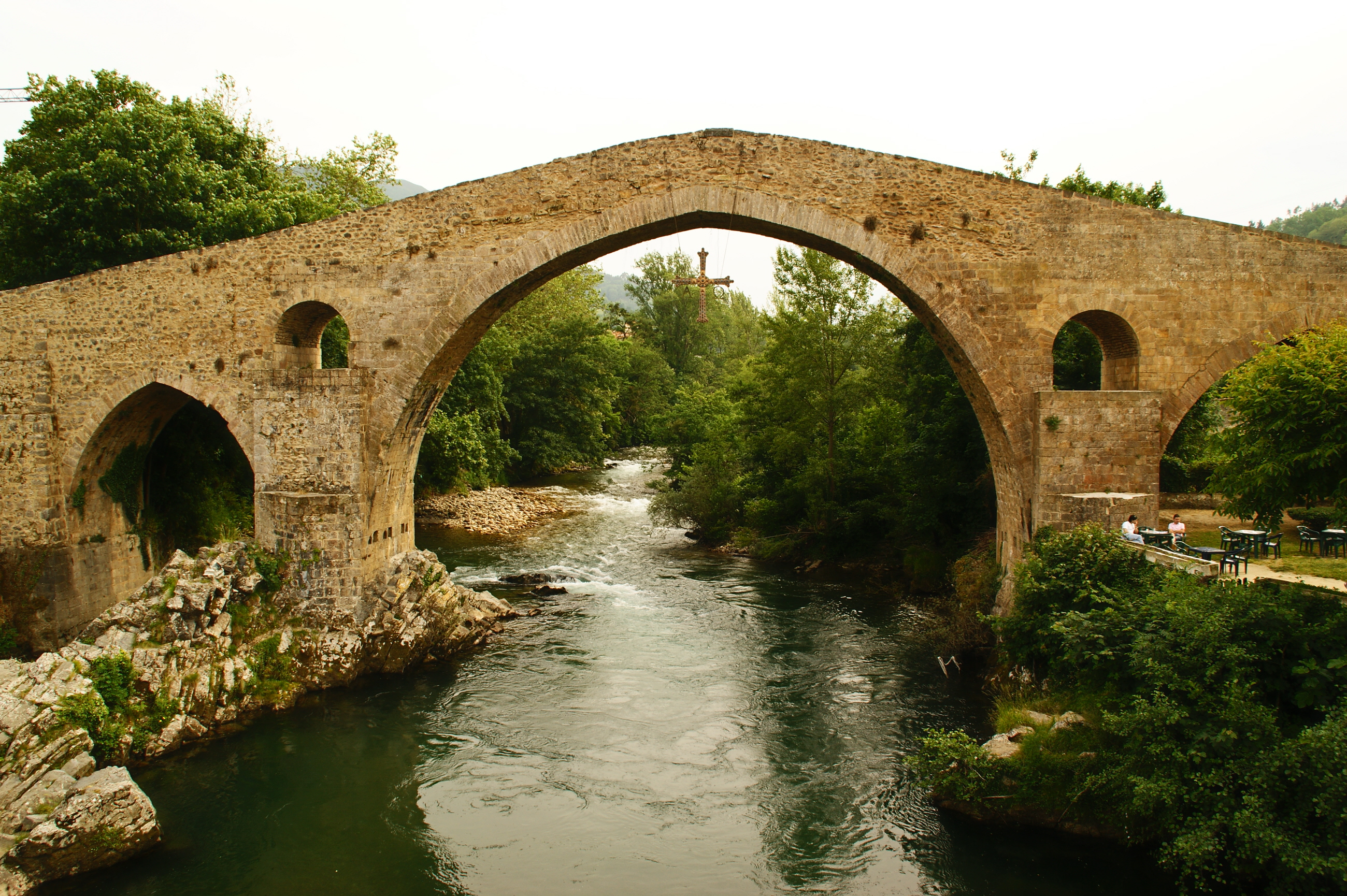
- The hump-backed "Roman Bridge" on the Sella River

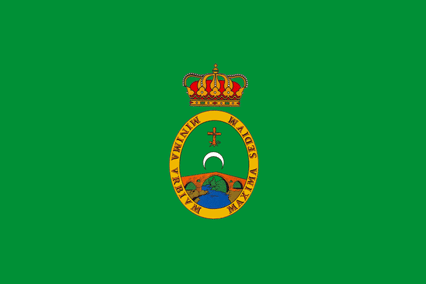
- Flag Coat of arms

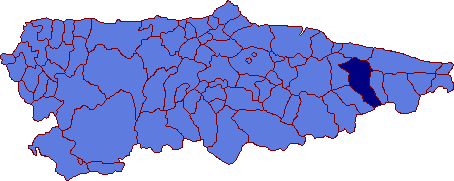

- Location in Spain
- Coordinates: 43°21′N 5°8′W
- Country: Spain
- Autonomous community: Asturias
- Province: Asturias
- Comarca: Oriente
- Judicial district: Cangas de Onís
- Capital: Cangas de Onís

Government
  - Alcalde: Jose Manuel González Castro (PP)

Area
  - Total: 212.75 km^{2} (82.14 sq mi)
- Highest elevation: 2,478 m (8,130 ft)

Population (2025-01-01)
  - Total: 6,344
  - Density: 29.82/km^{2} (77.23/sq mi)
- Demonym: cangués
- Time zone: UTC+1 (CET)
  - Summer (DST): UTC+2 (CEST)
- Postal code: 33547 to 33559
- Website: Official website

Cangas de Onís (Asturian: Cangues d'Onís "valleys of Onís") is a municipality in the eastern part of the province and autonomous community of Asturias in the northwest of Spain. The capital of the municipality is also Cangas de Onís.

More than seventy square kilometres of the conceyu form part of the Parque nacional de los Picos de Europa.

== History ==
Within the park is the village of Covadonga, where the battle of Covadonga (about 722), the first major victory by a Christian military force in Iberia after the Islamic conquest, marks the starting-point of the Reconquista. Cangas de Onís is the site of the first church constructed in post-conquest Iberia, Santa Cruz de Cangas de Onís (737), built on an ancient dolmen. Cangas de Onís is also very known for being the first capital of the Kingdom of Asturias. A parish named Cangas de Onís is attested for the 14th century. The stone bridge across the Sella River was built in the 14th or 15th century.

Cangas de Onís was represented in the Junta General of the principality of Asturias in 1504. Covadonga began to be developed as a pilgrimage site in the 16th century, attracting commerce. The settlement of Cangas de Onís grew rapidly in the mid 19th century. A meteorite fall is recorded for the year 1866.

Cangas de Onís/Cangues d'Onís was bombarded several times in the Spanish Civil War. It served as the seat of the Regional Council in the "pre-autonomous regime" of 1978–1981 prior to the entering into force of the Statute of Autonomy of the Principality of Asturias on 31 January 1982.

== Vegetation ==
Given its varied height it has many types of plants, including many mountain shrubs, heather; oak, have and ash trees, rounded by grassland and copes.

== Economy ==
The main economic activities of this region are agriculture and cattle rearing along with rural tourism. The nearby Covadonga Sanctuary and its surrounding lakes are one of the main tourist destinations in Asturias.

== Parishes ==
Cangas de Onís is divided in eleven parishes:

- Abamia
- Cangas de Onís
- Con
- Covadonga
- Grazanes
- Labra
- Margolles
- La Riera
- Triongo
- Villanueva
- Zardón

The capital of the municipality is the parish of Cangas de Onís. It is 27.22 km^{2} (10.51 sq mi) in size with a population of 4,326 (INE 2005). The postal code is 33550 and is divided in several villages:

- Cañu
- Cabielles
- Cangues
- Cardes
- Celangu
- Ḥelgueres
- Llueves
- Ñarciandi
- Ñeda
- Onao
- Següencu
- Torió
- Tornín

== Notable people ==
- Berta Piñán (born 1963), writer, politician
- Benjamina Miyar (1888–1961) Spanish photographer, watchmaker and member of the Spanish anti-fascist resistance

== Gallery ==
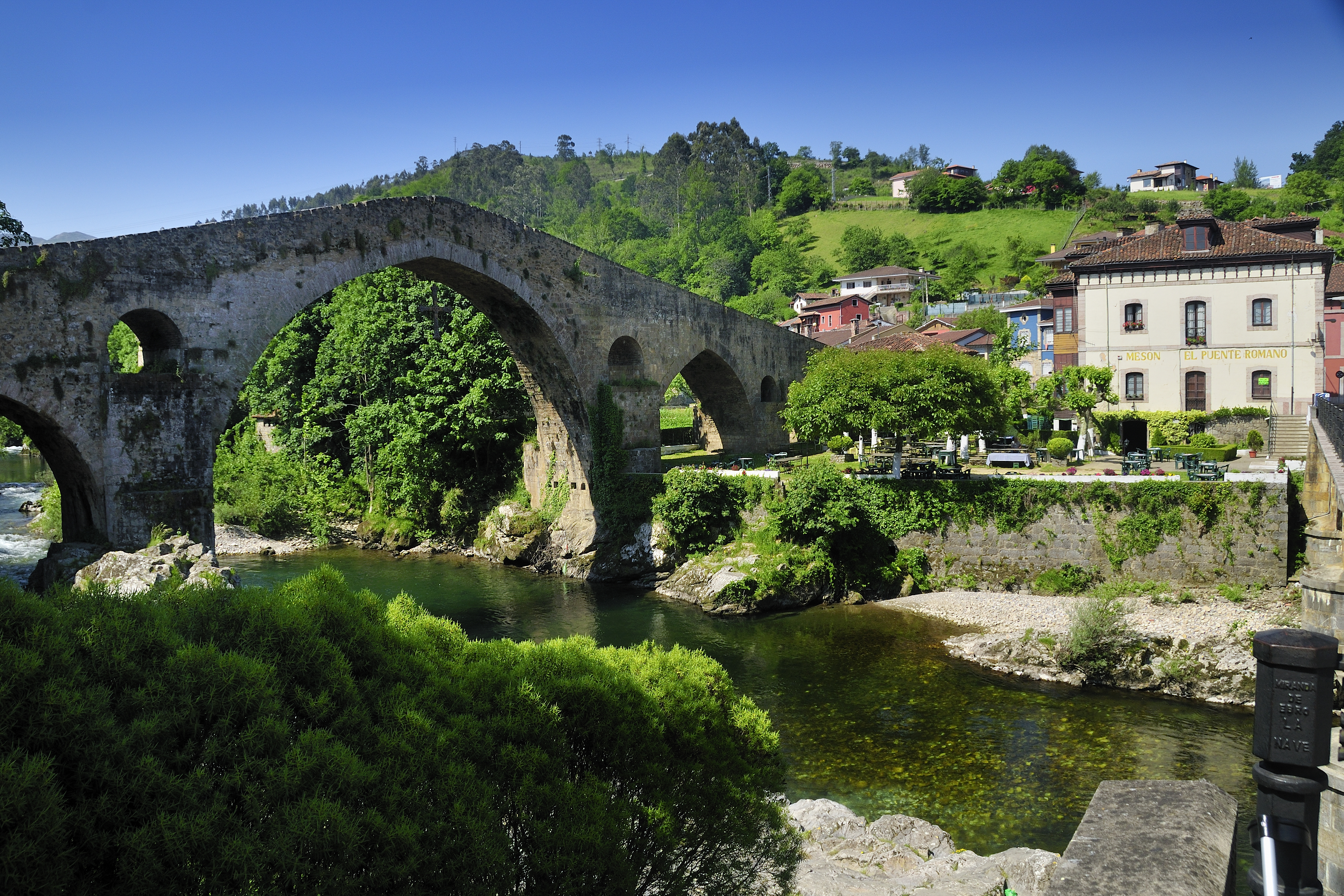
13th century bridge over Rio Sella

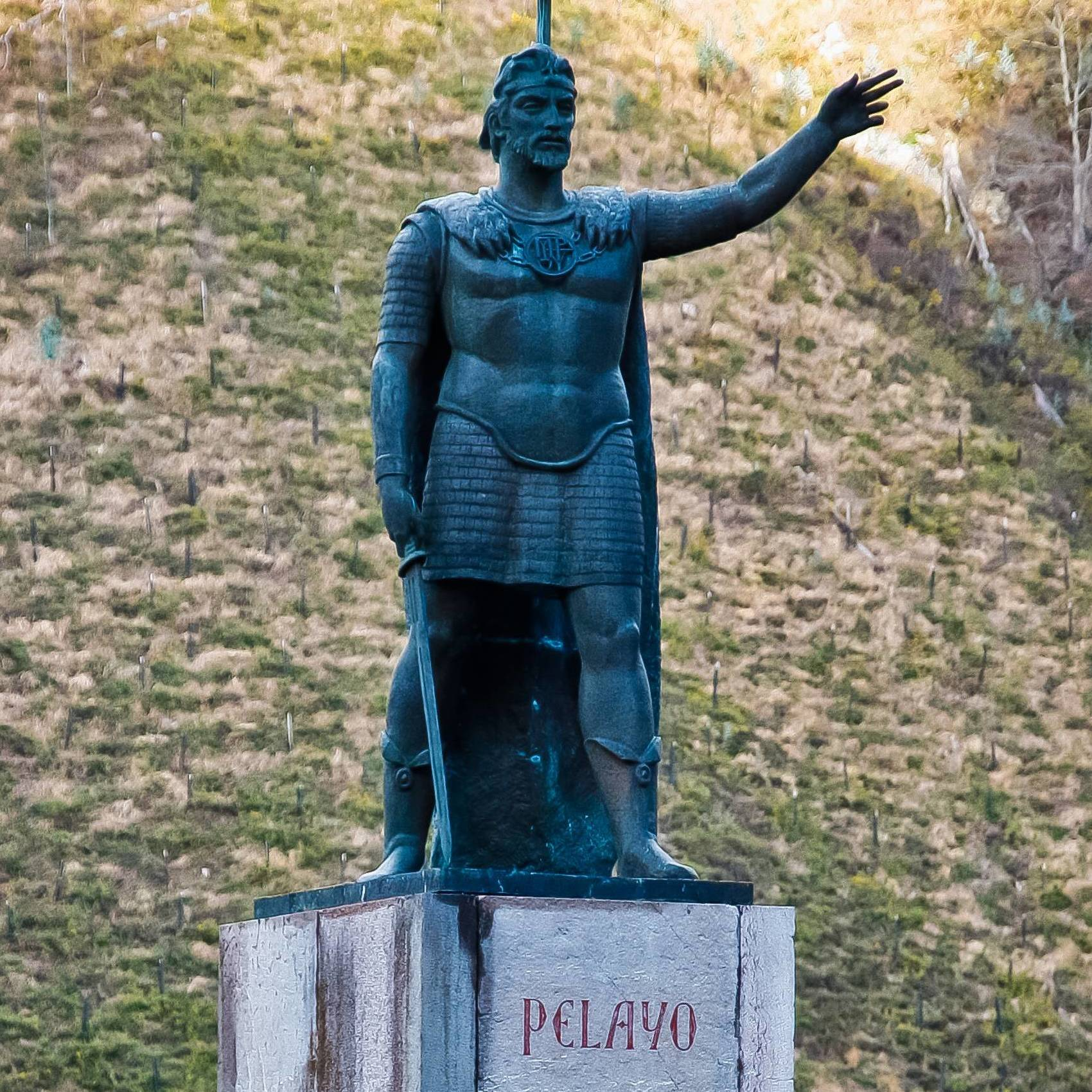
Statue of the King Pelayo

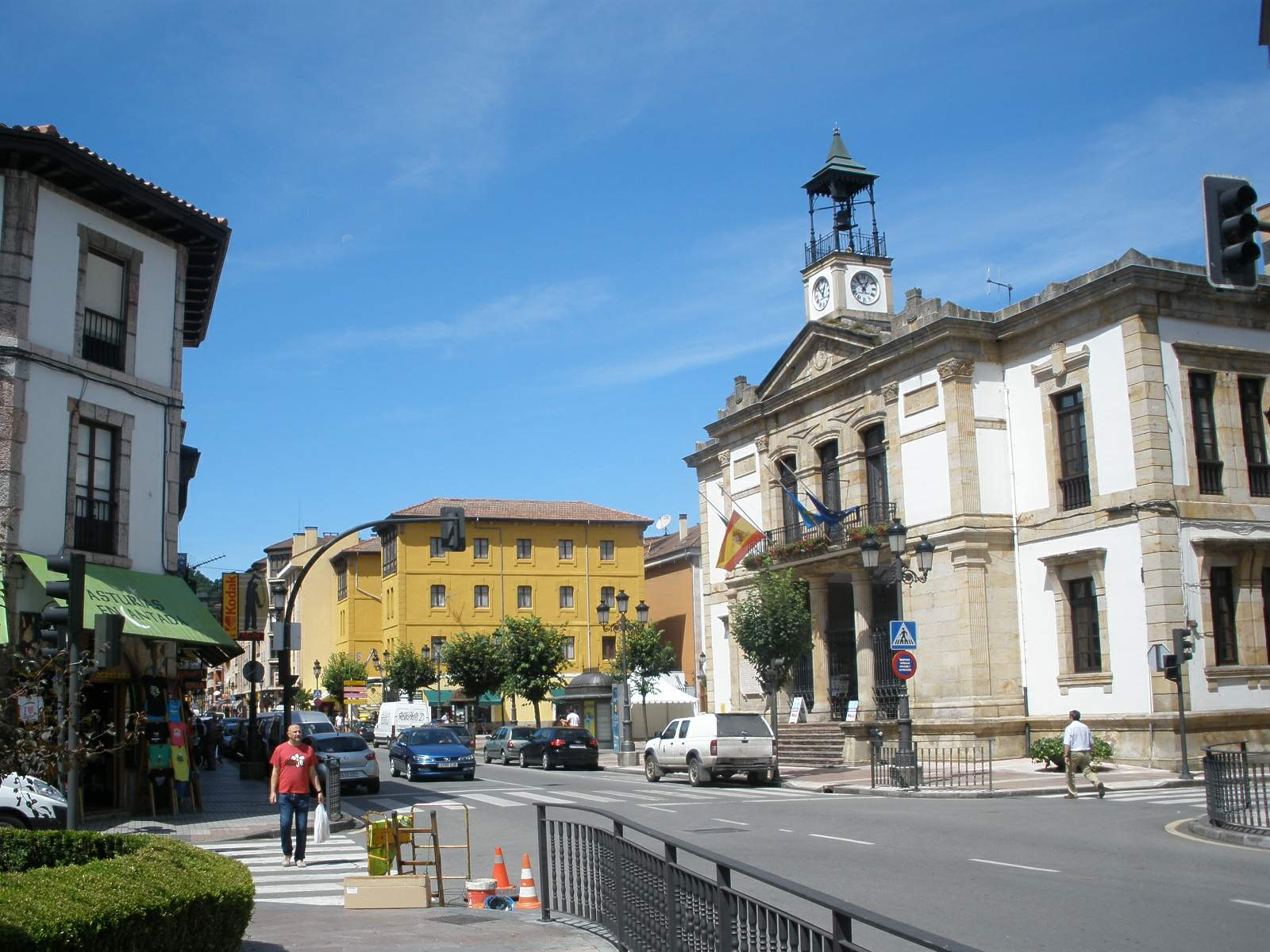
Cangas town hall

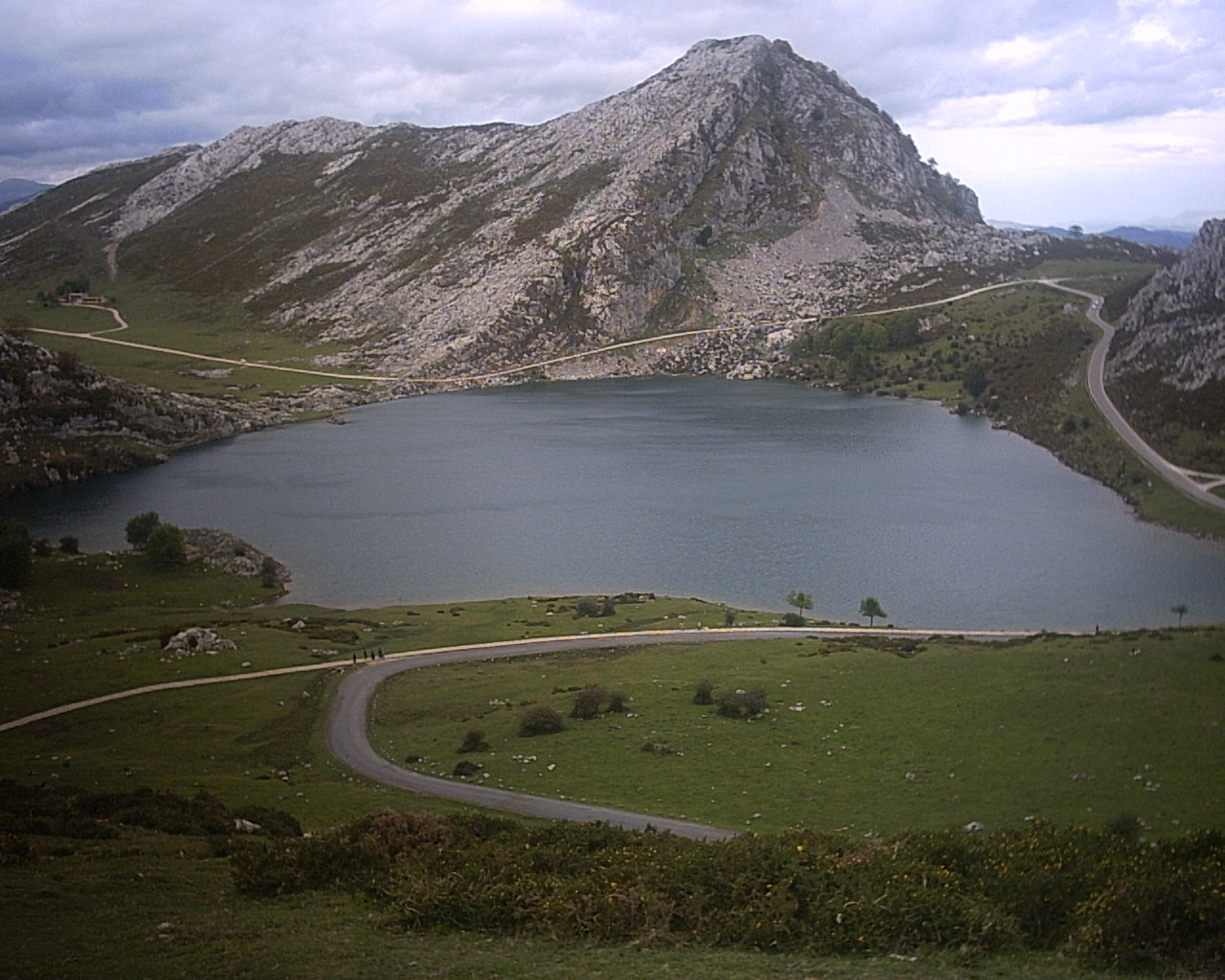
Enol Lake at Covadonga

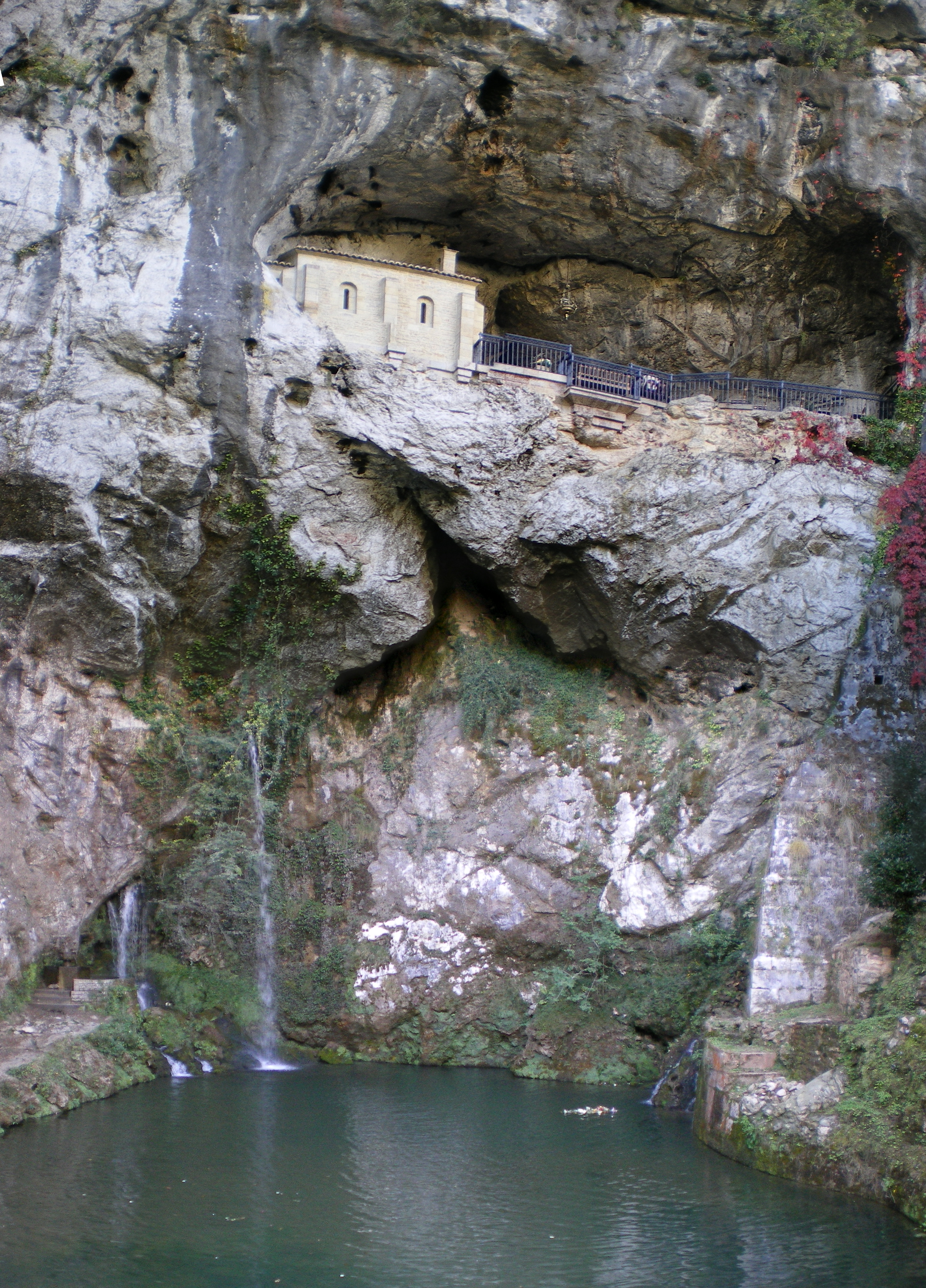
Holy Cave of Covadonga

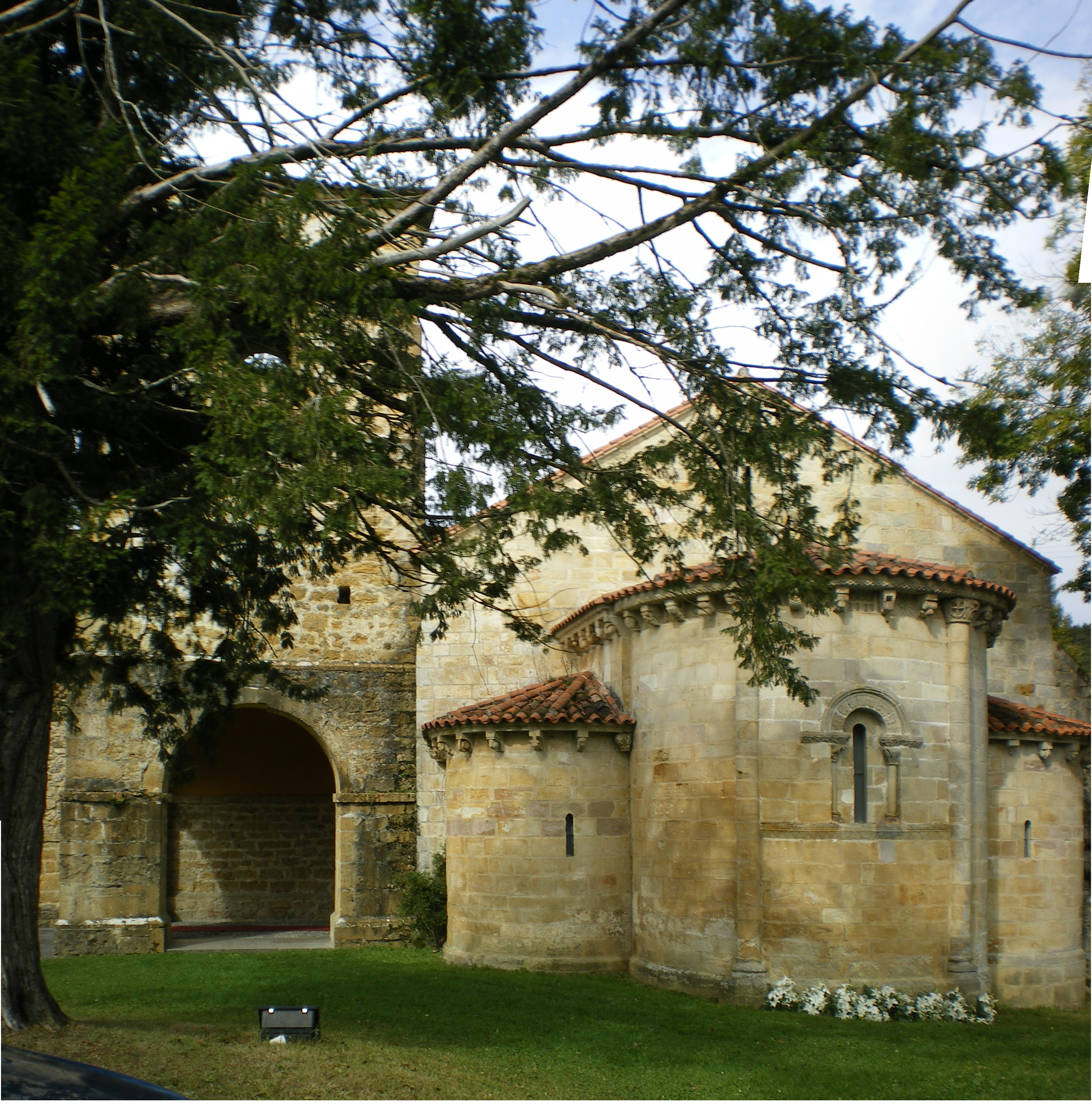
Monastery of San Pedro de Villanueva (12th century) - Church

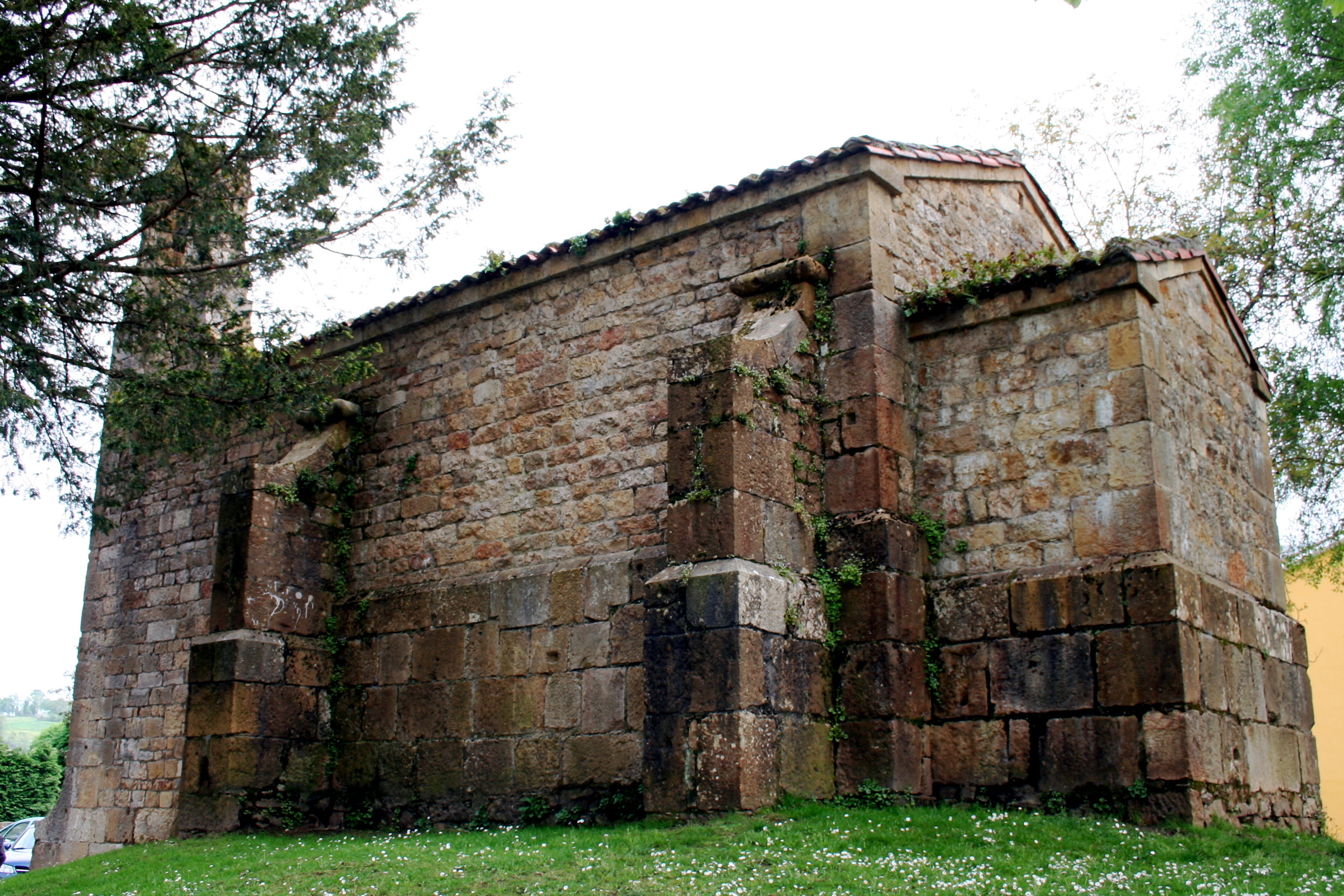
Church of Santa Cruz - Lateral side

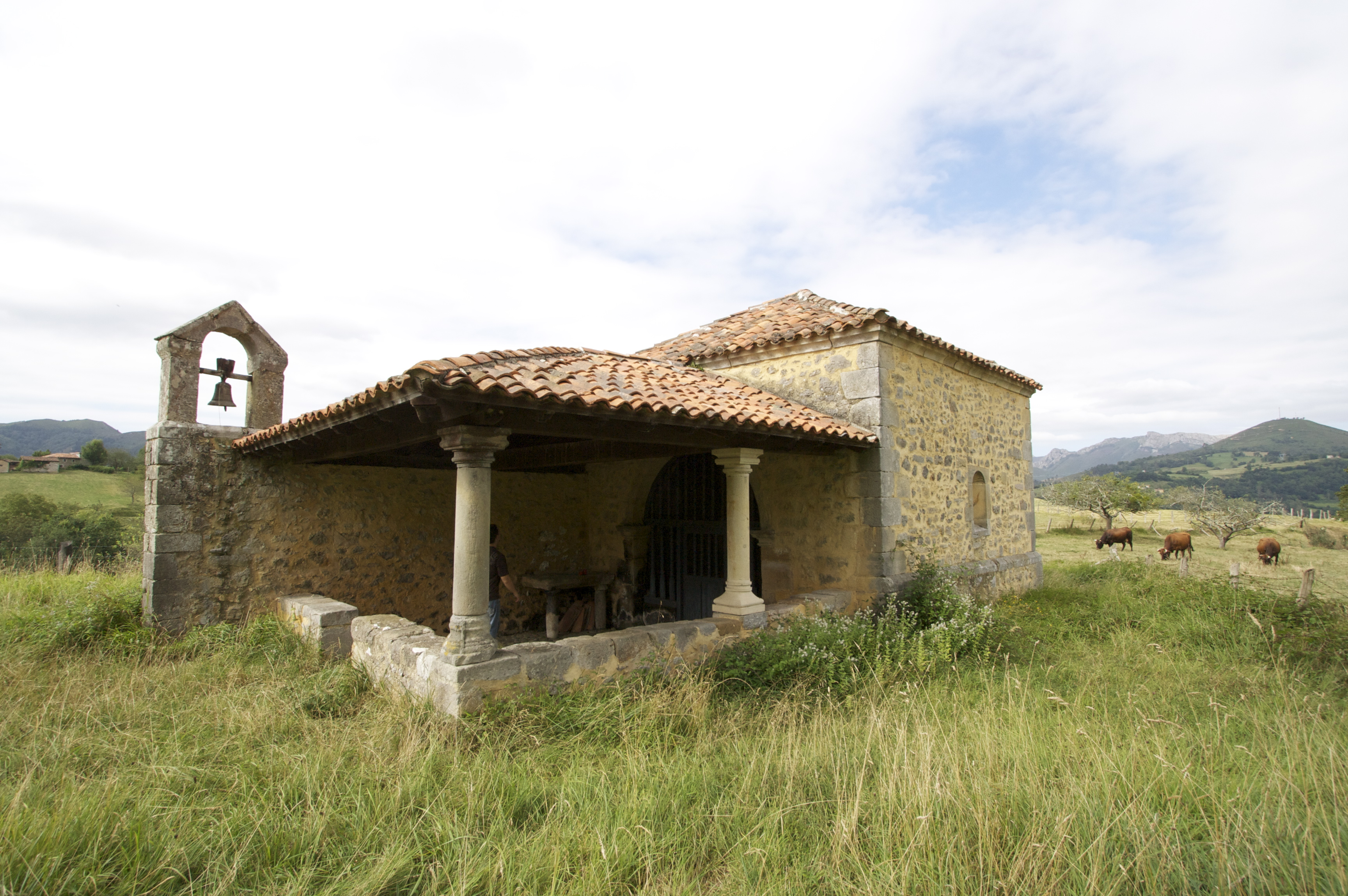
Chapel of Santo Medero

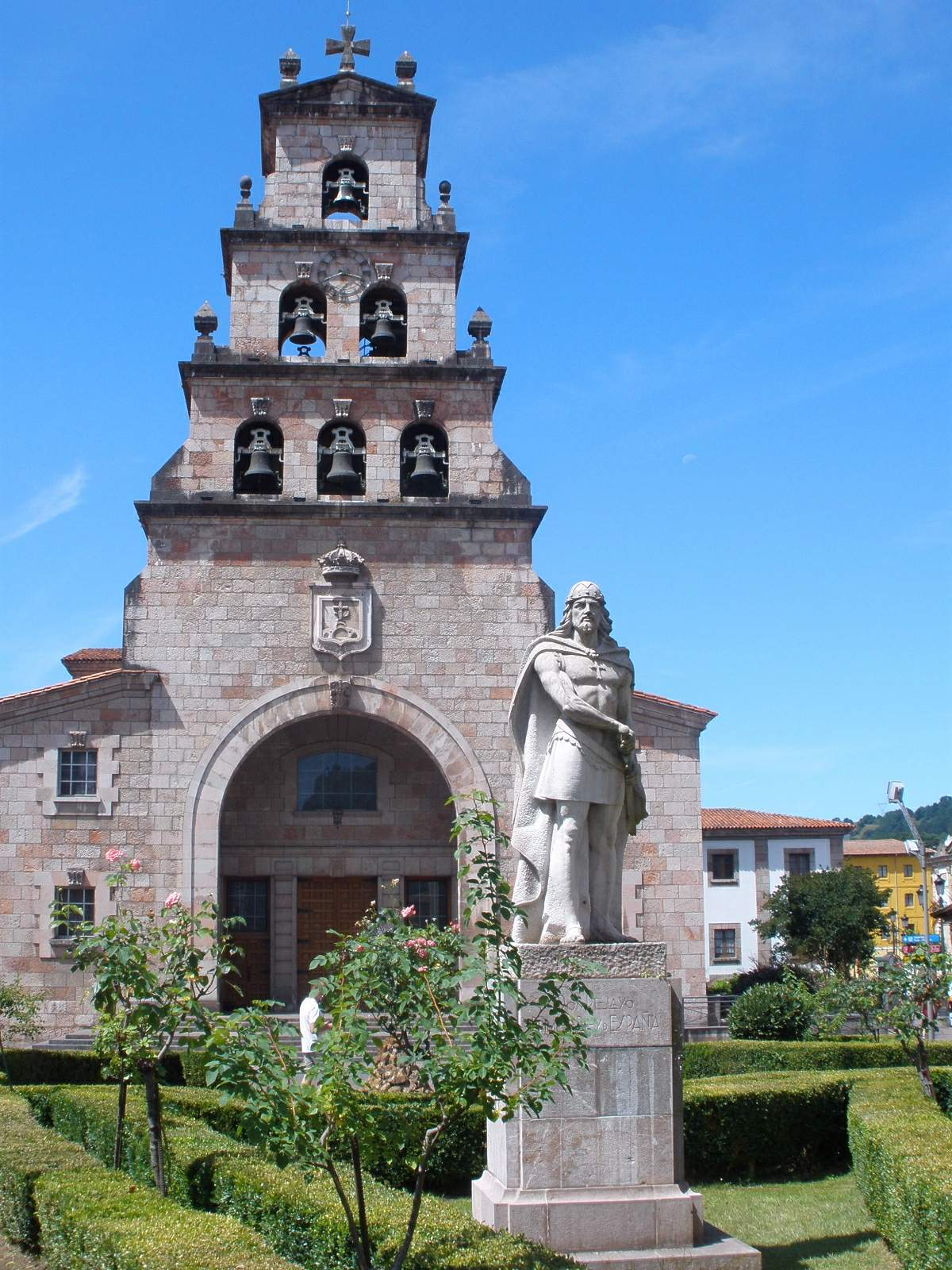
Cangas church

== See also ==
- List of municipalities in Asturias
