= Abamia =

- Parish
- Location within Spain
- Coordinates: 43.333333°N 5.05°W
- Country: Spain
- Autonomous community: Asturias
- Province: Asturias
- Municipality: Cangas de Onís

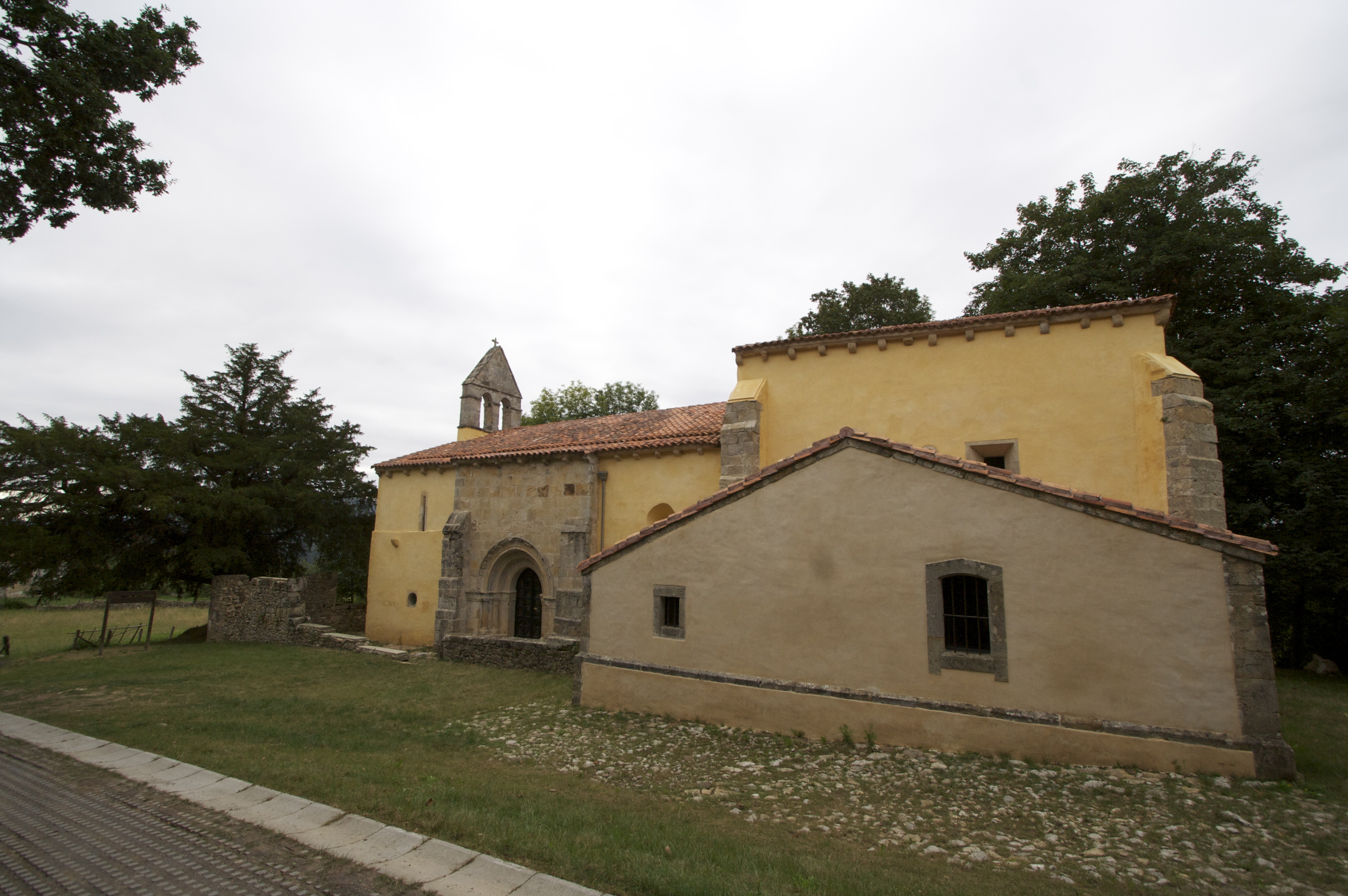
Church of Santa Eulalia de Abamia

Abamia is one of eleven parishes in Cangas de Onís, a municipality within the province and autonomous community of Asturias, in northern Spain. It is situated in the Picos de Europa mountains.
