= Margolles =

- Parish
- Location within Spain Location within Asturias
- Country: Spain
- Autonomous community: Asturias
- Province: Asturias
- Municipality: Parres

Margolles is one of eleven parishes (administrative divisions) in Cangas de Onís, a municipality within the province and autonomous community of Asturias, by northern Spain's Picos de Europa mountains.

== Villages ==
- Agüera
- Cuencu
- La Granda
- Llanu
- Parda
- Peruyes
- Toraño
- Villa
- Viñaes
