= Samartín de Grazanes =

- Parish
- Location within Spain
- Country: Spain
- Autonomous community: Asturias
- Province: Asturias
- Municipality: Cangas de Onís

Samartín de Grazanes is one of eleven parishes (administrative divisions) in Cangas de Onís, a municipality within the province and autonomous community of Asturias, by northern Spain's Picos de Europa mountains.

== Villages ==
- Samartín
- Beceña
- Cuerres
- Llenín
- Tárañu
- Villaverde
