= Church of San Pedro de Plecín =

Coordinates: 43.3298°N 4.7014°W

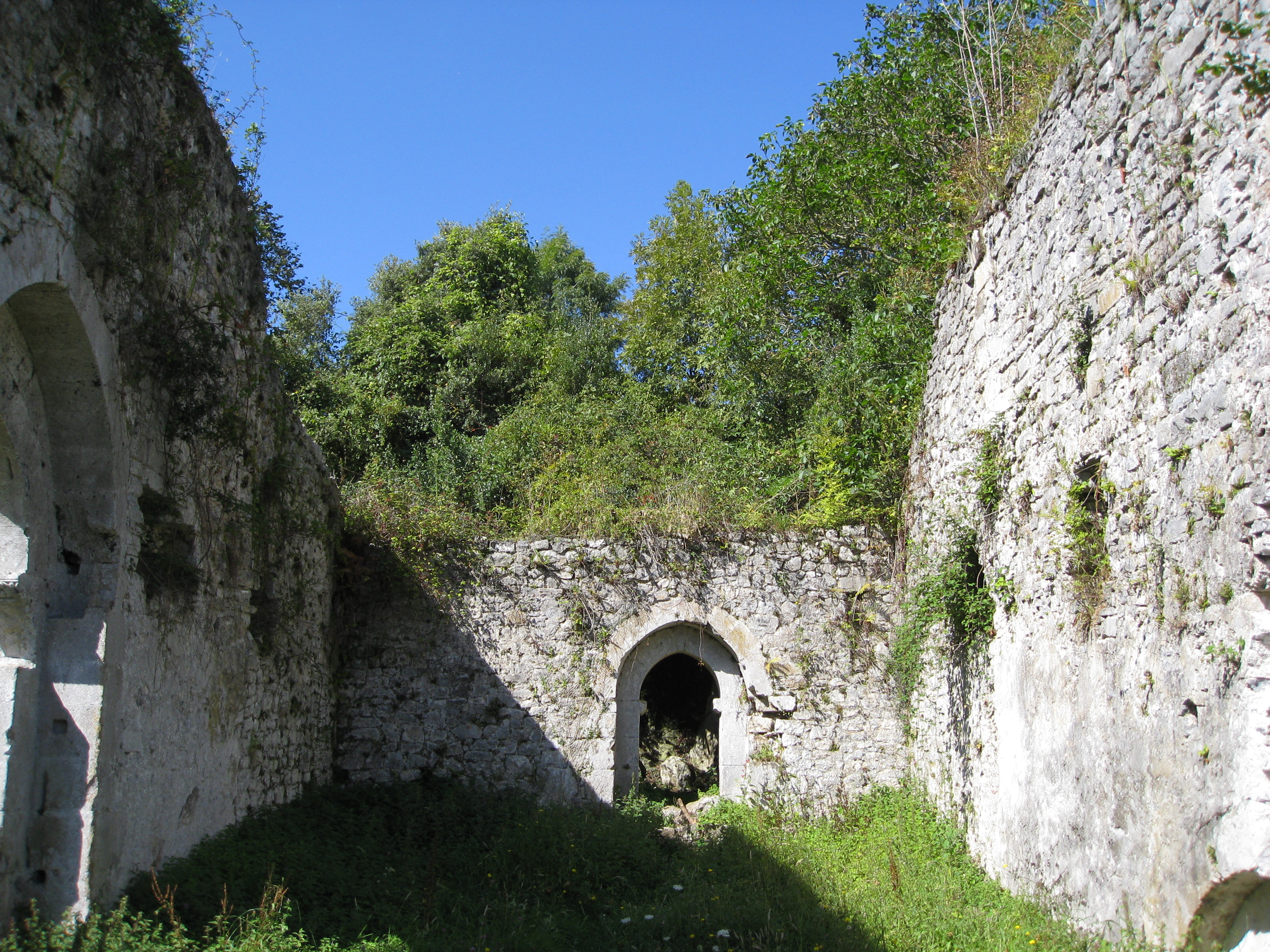
- Church of San Pedro de Plecín
- Location: Asturias, Spain

Church of San Pedro de Plecín (Spanish: Iglesia de San Pedro de Plecín) is a former Roman Catholic church located in Alles (parish of San Pedro), capital of the council of Peñamellera Alta in Asturias, Spain.

== History ==
The church probably stands on an ancient pre-Christian place of worship. It was built in the last quarter of the 12th century, in a late Romanesque style. It was originally dedicated to San Salvador.

The church's west side was expanded in the 13th century and renovated and equipped with a porch in the 15th century. In the 14th or 15th century, the name was changed to San Pedro. In the 16th century, a funeral chapel was attached on the northern side.

The Mier family, who had historically financed San Pedro, stopped their funding in 1778. In 1787, a new parish church was erected in the center of Alles, and San Pedro was abandoned.

On October 30, 2003, the Church of San Pedro de Plecín was declared a monument by the Ministry of Culture, Social Communication and Tourism.

== Architecture ==
The church has a single nave and currently a straight apse, which was preceded by a semicircular apse. The main entrance is on the southern side. The apse is made out of blocks of sandstone, which are also used in the roof on the southern end. The nave is limestone masonry. The roof is topped by a barrel vault and the nave has a wooden ceiling.

The southern entrance rests on a plinth and is protected with a grooved tile. It consists of four slightly pointed archivolts, over which runs a honeycomb design similar to that on the posts which support the archivolts. The archivolts have various decorative elements, but the capitals are badly deteriorated. They are decorated with plant motifs, human figures and various fantastic creatures (mermaids, griffins and centaurs). Their base shafts no longer exist. On the right is a small window divided with an arrow, which is framed by a checkered dust cover and a molded and a five lobed archivolt arc.

The funeral chapel on the north side is of a square layout. It has no openings, and is roofed with a simple ribbed vault, which has helped protect the scalloped brackets upon which the roof rests.

Inside, the bases that supported the columns of the triumphal arch have been preserved. A possible capital of this arch is now in the City of Alles. It is decorated with plant motifs. The straight section preceding the apse runs under a covered arcade with three columns on each side, and the remaining two small bases. At present, vegetation and weeds invade the interior of the church and all its walls. Its ruins were recently cleaned and consolidated.

== See also ==
- Iglesia de San Pedro (Alles)
