= Llabra =

Llabra (Cangues d'Onís)
- Parish
- Location within Spain
- Coordinates: 43.366667°N 5.05°W
- Country: Spain
- Autonomous community: Asturias
- Province: Asturias
- Municipality: Cangas de Onís

Llabra is one of eleven parishes (administrative divisions) in Cangas de Onís, a municipality within the province and autonomous community of Asturias, by northern Spain's Picos de Europa mountains.

== Villages ==
- Cebia
- Llabra
- Tresanu
