= Triongu =

- Parish
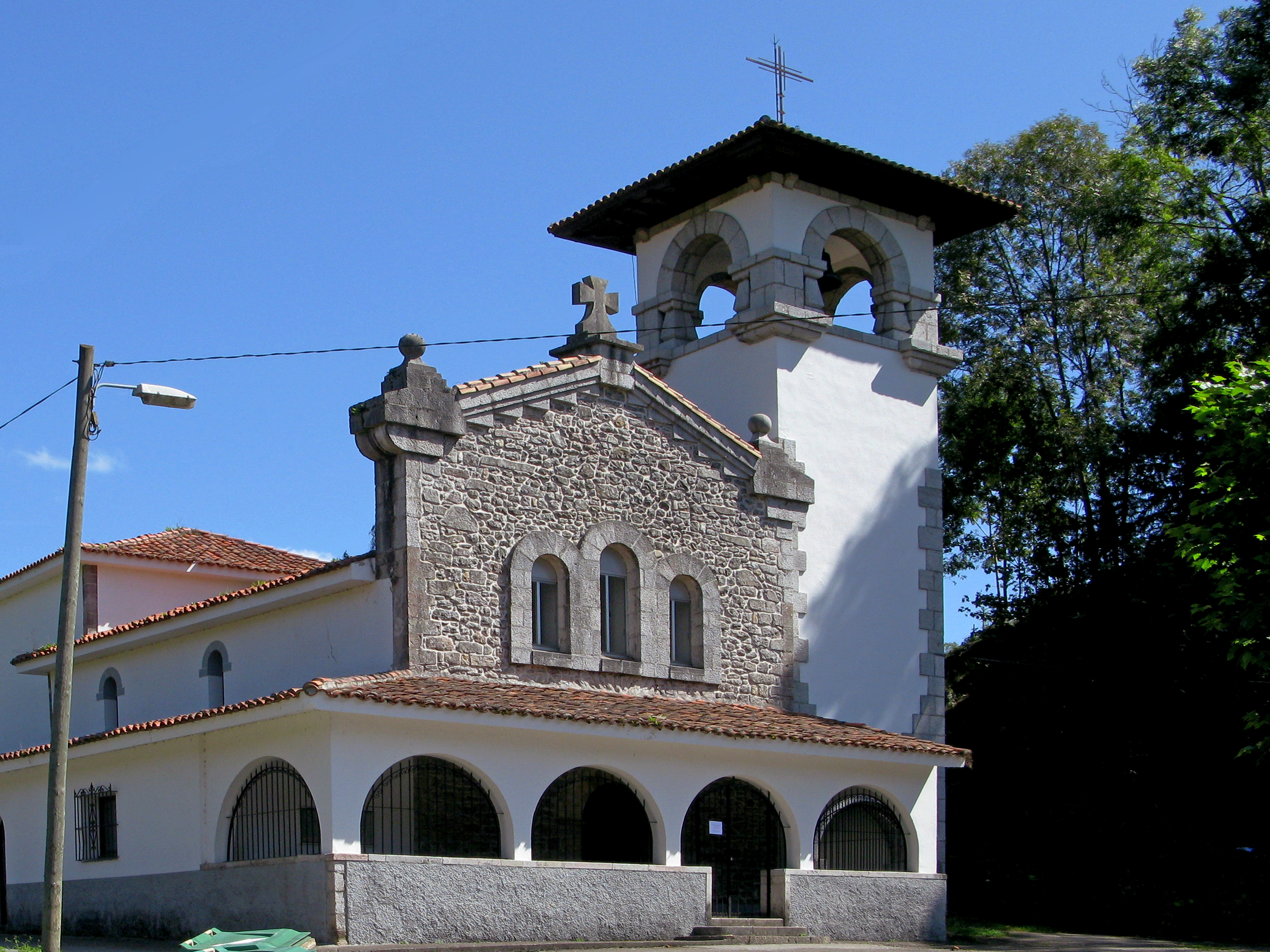

- Location within Spain
- Country: Spain
- Autonomous community: Asturias
- Province: Asturias
- Municipality: Cangas de Onís

Triongu is one of the eleven parishes (administrative divisions) in Cangas de Onís, a municipality within the province and autonomous community of Asturias, by northern Spain's Picos de Europa mountains.

In 942, King Ramiro II of León donated to the bishop Vermudo of Oviedo the churches of San Vicente and Santa Eulalia of Triongu. This was written in a document conserved in the Archive of the Cathedral of Oviedo.

== Villages ==
- Coviella
- Miyar
- Oliciu
- Triongu
