= San Xuan de la Duz =

- Parish
- Location within Spain
- Coordinates: 43.483333°N 5.25°W
- Country: Spain
- Autonomous community: Asturias
- Province: Asturias
- Municipality: Colunga

San Xuan de la Duz is one of 13 parishes (administrative divisions) in the municipality of Colunga, within the province and autonomous community of Asturias, in northern Spain.

The population is 170 (INE 2007).

== Villages ==
- Güerres
- San Telmo
- San Xuan
