= Zardón =

- Parish
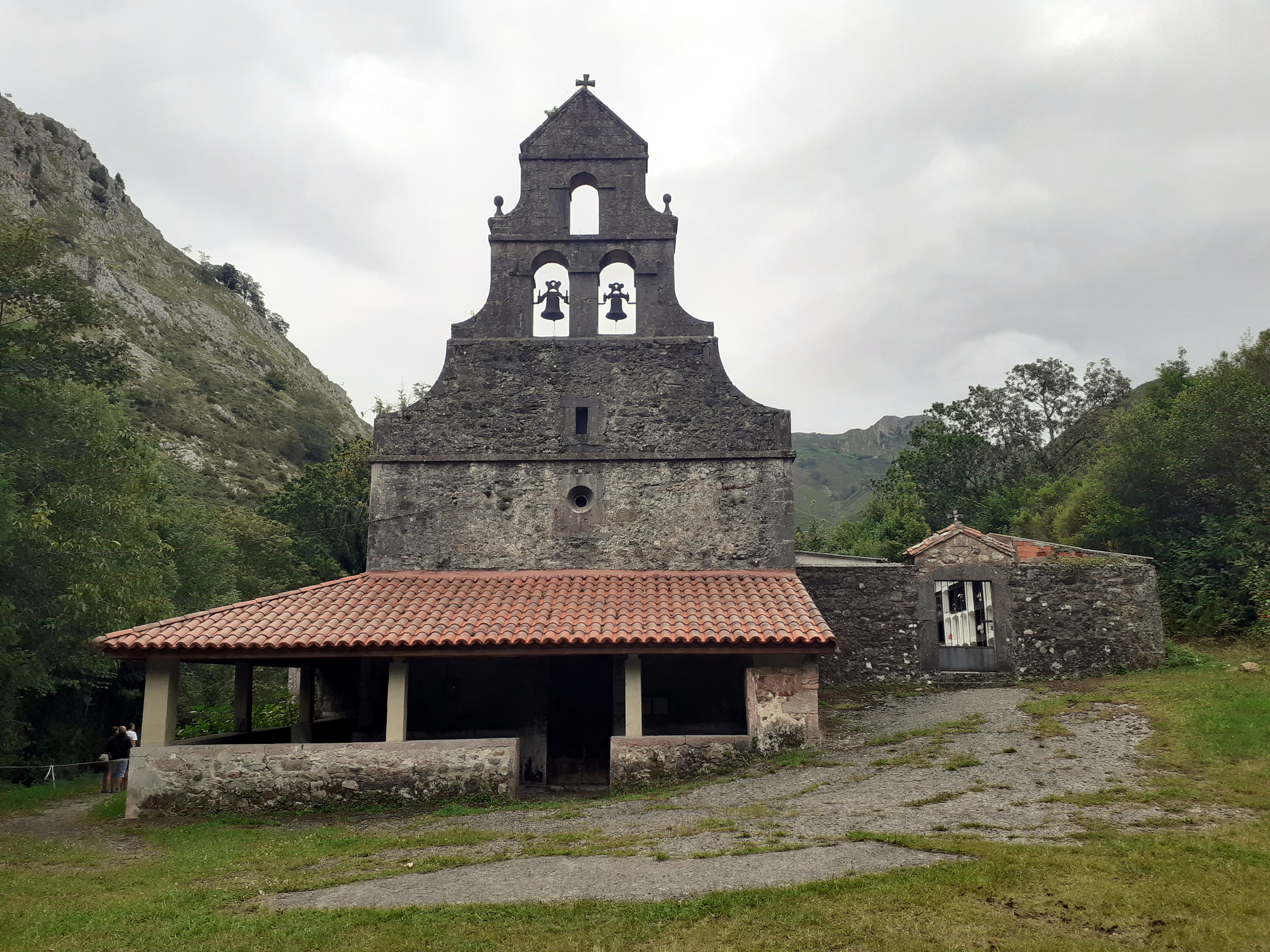

- Location within Spain
- Country: Spain
- Autonomous community: Asturias
- Province: Asturias
- Municipality: Cangas de Onís

Zardón is one of eleven parishes (administrative divisions) in Cangas de Onís, a municipality within the province and autonomous community of Asturias, by northern Spain's Picos de Europa mountains.

== Villages ==
- Bustuvela
- Ixena
- Santianes d'Ola
- Zardón
