= Pivierda =

- Parish
- Location within Spain
- Coordinates: 43.45°N 5.333333°W
- Country: Spain
- Autonomous community: Asturias
- Province: Asturias
- Municipality: Colunga

Pivierda is one of 13 parishes (administrative divisions) in the Colunga municipality, within the province and autonomous community of Asturias, in northern Spain.

The population is 79 (INE 2007).

== Villages ==
- Agüera Riba
- Bucial
- Corrales
- Tizagua
