= Capilla de Santo Medero (Isongo) =

Coordinates: 43°20′19″N 5°04′32″W

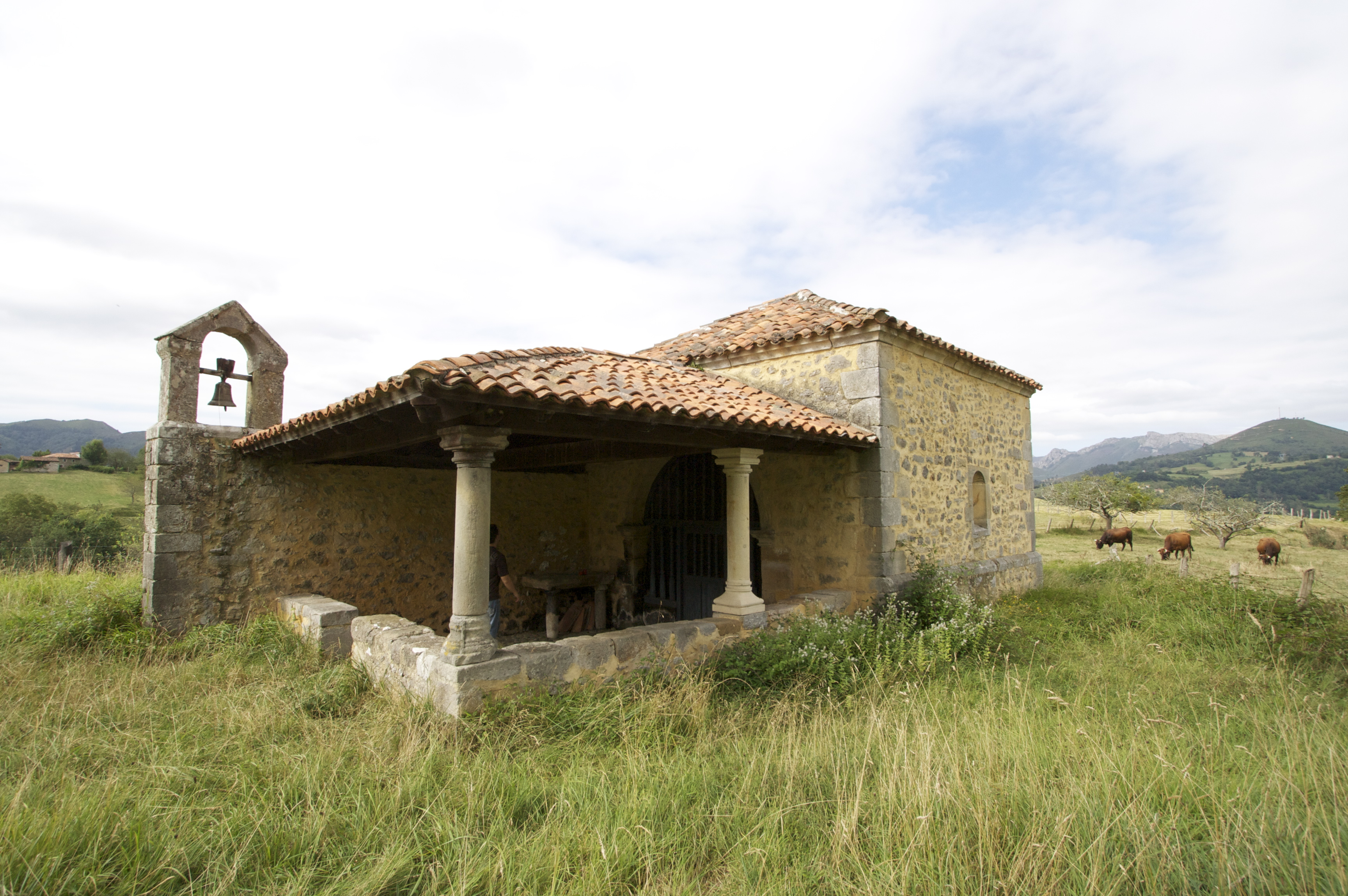
- Capilla de Santo Medero (Isongo)
- Location: Asturias, Spain

Capilla de Santo Medero (Isongo) (Spanish: [kaˈpiʎa ðe ˈsanto meˈðeɾo]) is a church in Asturias, Spain.

== Description ==
It's a rural chapel built in the 18th century with later additions in the 19th century.

Inside, there is an altarpiece with the image of Santo Medero.

== Mural Paintings ==
Includes representations of the martyrdoms of Saints, stations of the Way of the Cross, scenes alluding to Hell, Death and the Passion of Christ.

Additionally, there are vegetal and geometric decorations.

== Style ==
The chapel is done in a popular baroque style from the end of the eighteenth century.

== See also ==
- Asturian art
- Catholic Church in Spain
