= Iglesia de San Pedro (Alles) =

Coordinates: 43°19′57″N 4°42′14″W

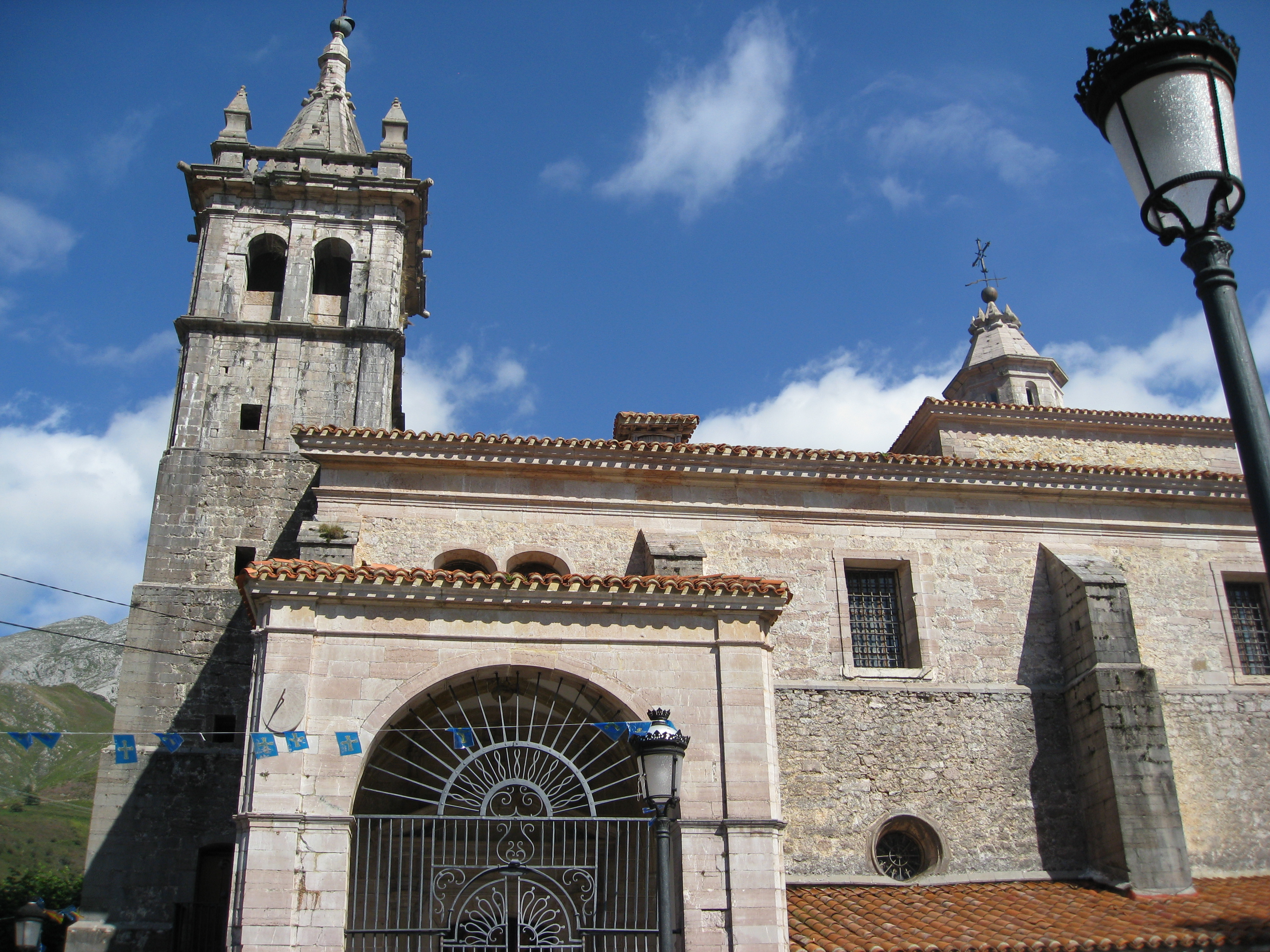
- Iglesia de San Pedro (Alles)
- Location: Asturias, Spain

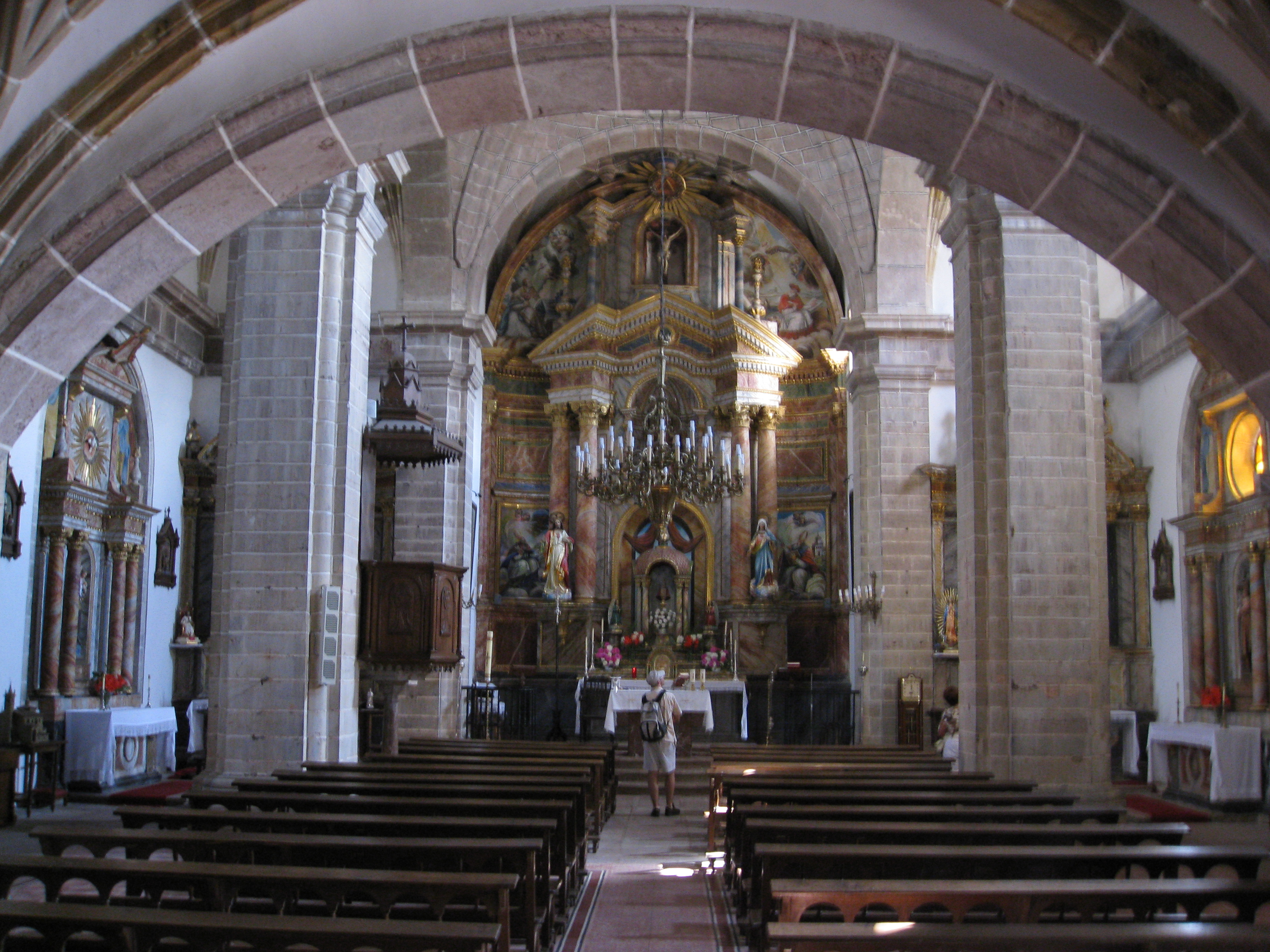

Iglesia de San Pedro (Alles) is a historic church in Asturias, Spain, established in 1787.

== See also ==
- Asturian art
- Catholic Church in Spain
- Church of San Pedro de Plecín
