= Iglesia de Santa Eulalia =

Iglesia de Santa Eulalia may refer to:

- Iglesia de Santa Eulalia (Abamia), a church in Asturias, Spain
- Iglesia de Santa Eulalia (Selorio), a church in Asturias, Spain
