= Iglesia de Santa Eulalia (Selorio) =

Coordinates: 43°30′53″N 5°21′48″W

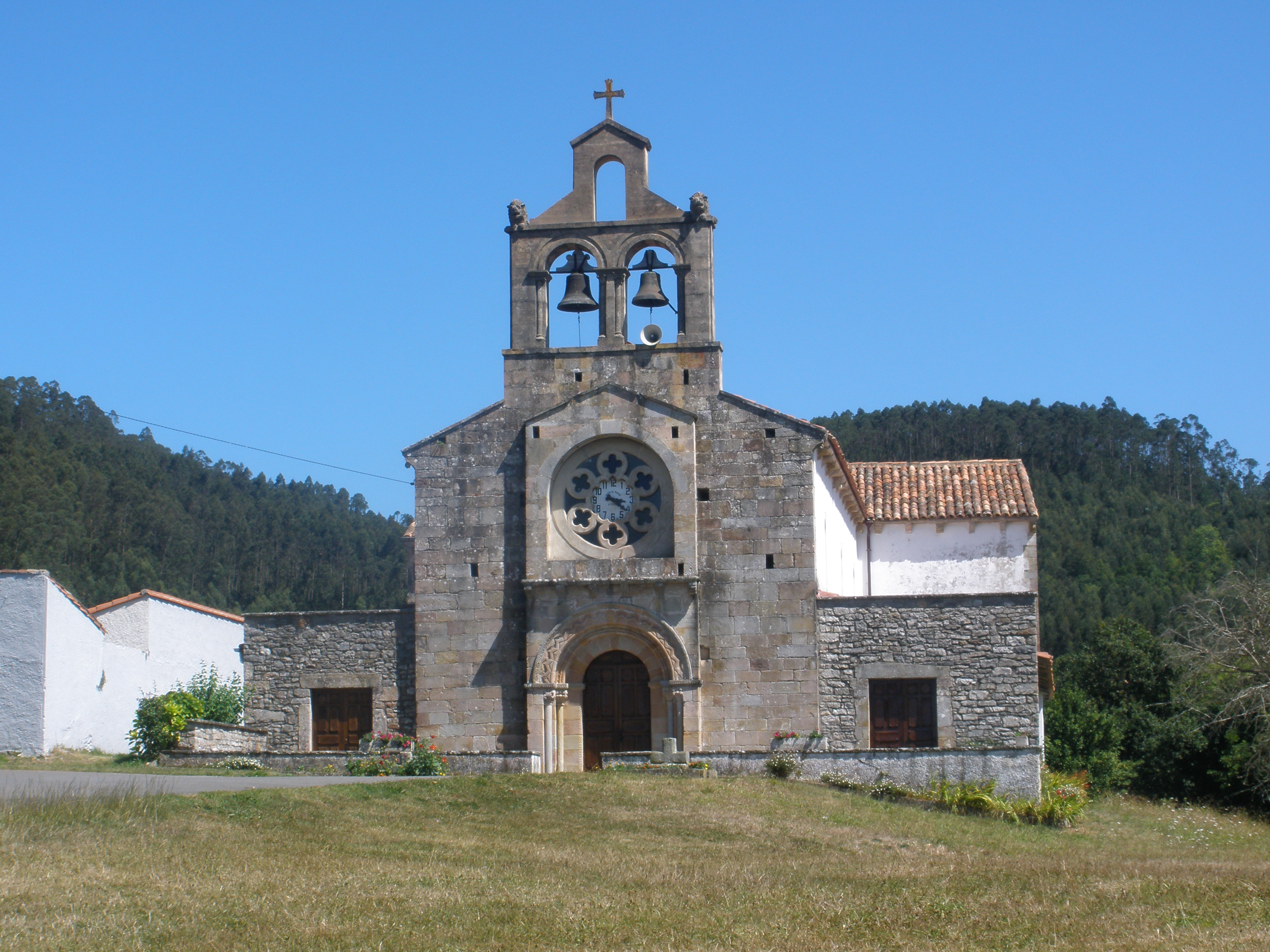
- Iglesia de Santa Eulalia (Selorio)
- Location: Asturias, Spain

Iglesia de Santa Eulalia (Selorio) is a church in Asturias, Spain.
