= Carbajal =

Carbajal is a Spanish surname. It may refer to:

- Alejandro Carbajal González (born 1972), Mexican politician
- Antonio Carbajal (1929–2023), Mexican footballer
- Bernardo Palacios-Carbajal (1998–2020), American murder victim
- Carlos Pesantes Carbajal (born 1950), Peruvian chess player
- Cruz Carbajal (born 1974), Mexican boxer
- Enrique Carbajal González (born 1947), Mexican sculptor
- Fernando Carbajal (born 1964), Argentine politician
- Garcí Manuel de Carbajal (fl. 1540), Spanish conquistador, founder of city Arequipa in Peru
- Gonzalo Carbajal (1590–1661), Spanish-Peruvian general and mayor
- Ivan Carbajal (born 1990), Mexican cyclist
- Jorge Suárez Carbajal (born 1976), Spanish-Asturian piper
- José Carbajal (Uruguayan musician) (1943–2010)
- José María Jesús Carbajal (1809–1874) Mexican freedom fighter
- Juan Manuel Carbajal Hernández (born 1964), Mexican politician
- Liliana Carbajal Méndez (born 1976), Mexican politician
- Luis de Carbajal (1531–after 1618), Spanish painter
- Michael Carbajal (born 1967), American boxer
- Rafael Carbajal (born 1960), Uruguay football player and manager
- Ricardo Carbajal (born 1968), Mexican football player and manager
- Rubén Carbajal (born 1993), Mexican American actor
- Salud Carbajal (born 1964), American politician

== See also ==
- Carbajal Valley, Tierra del Fuego Province, Argentina
- Fuentes de Carbajal, a municipality in Castile and León, Spain
- Carvajal, a surname
