= Oviedo =

Oviedo Uviéu (Asturian)
- Municipality
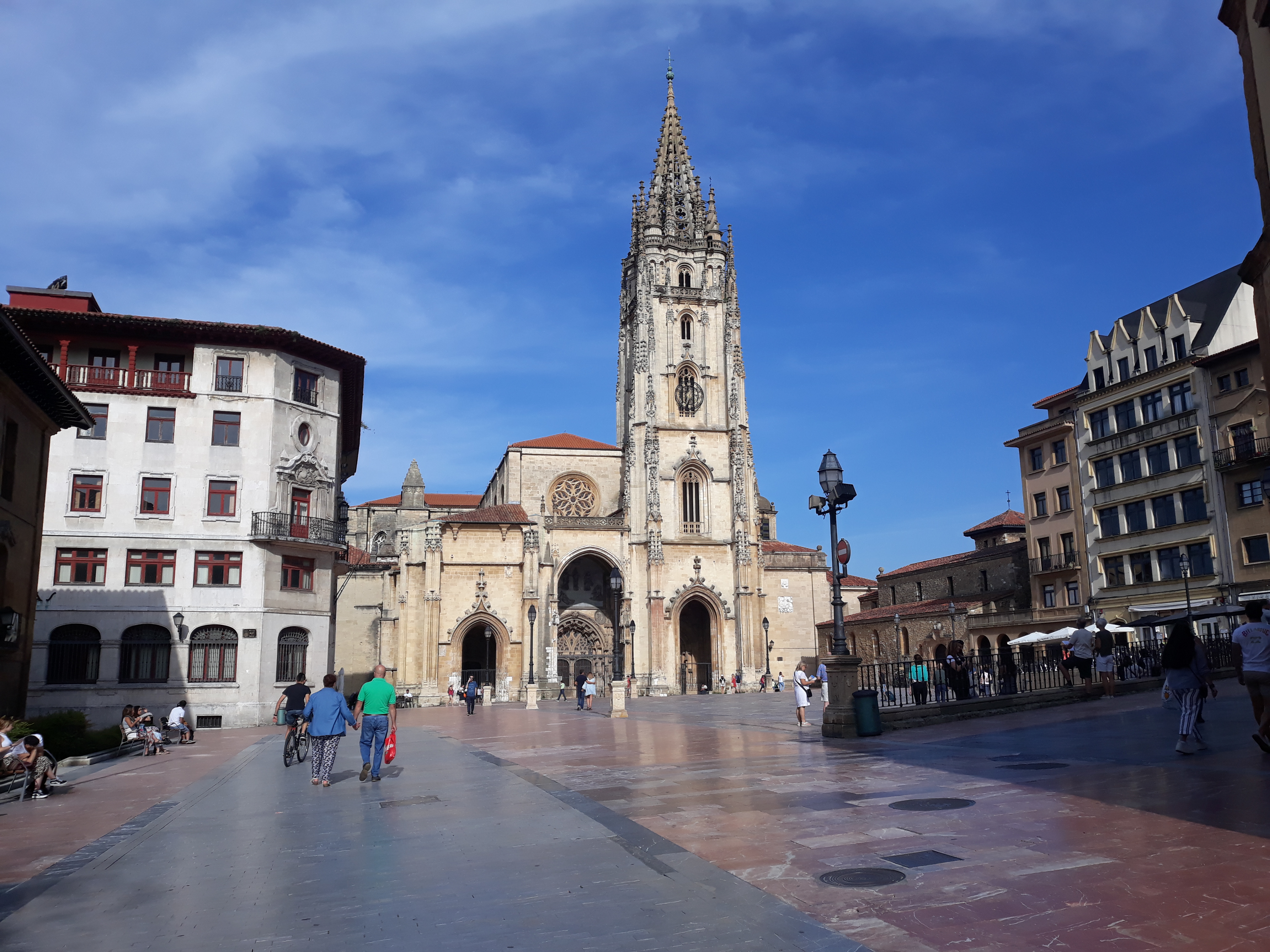
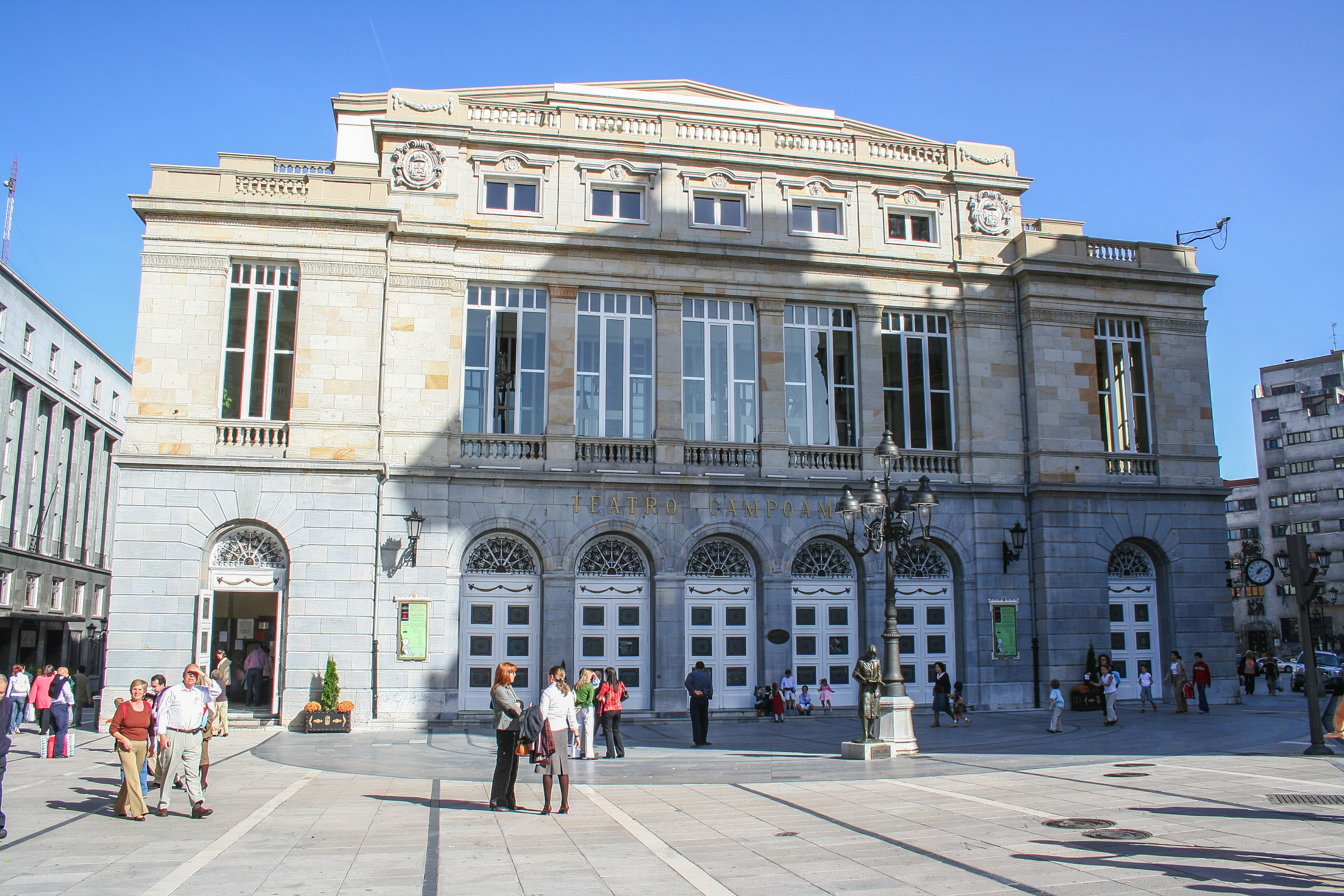
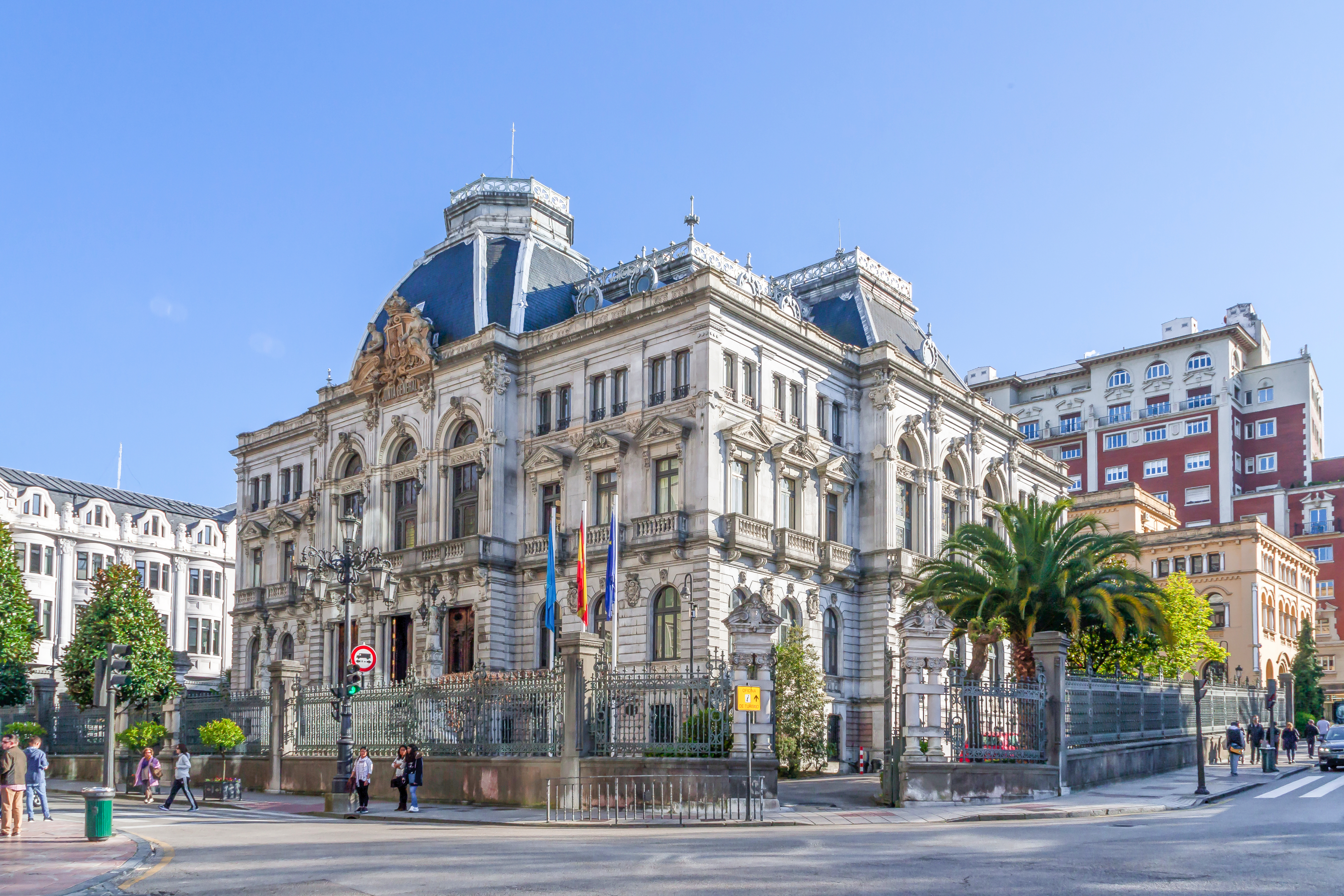
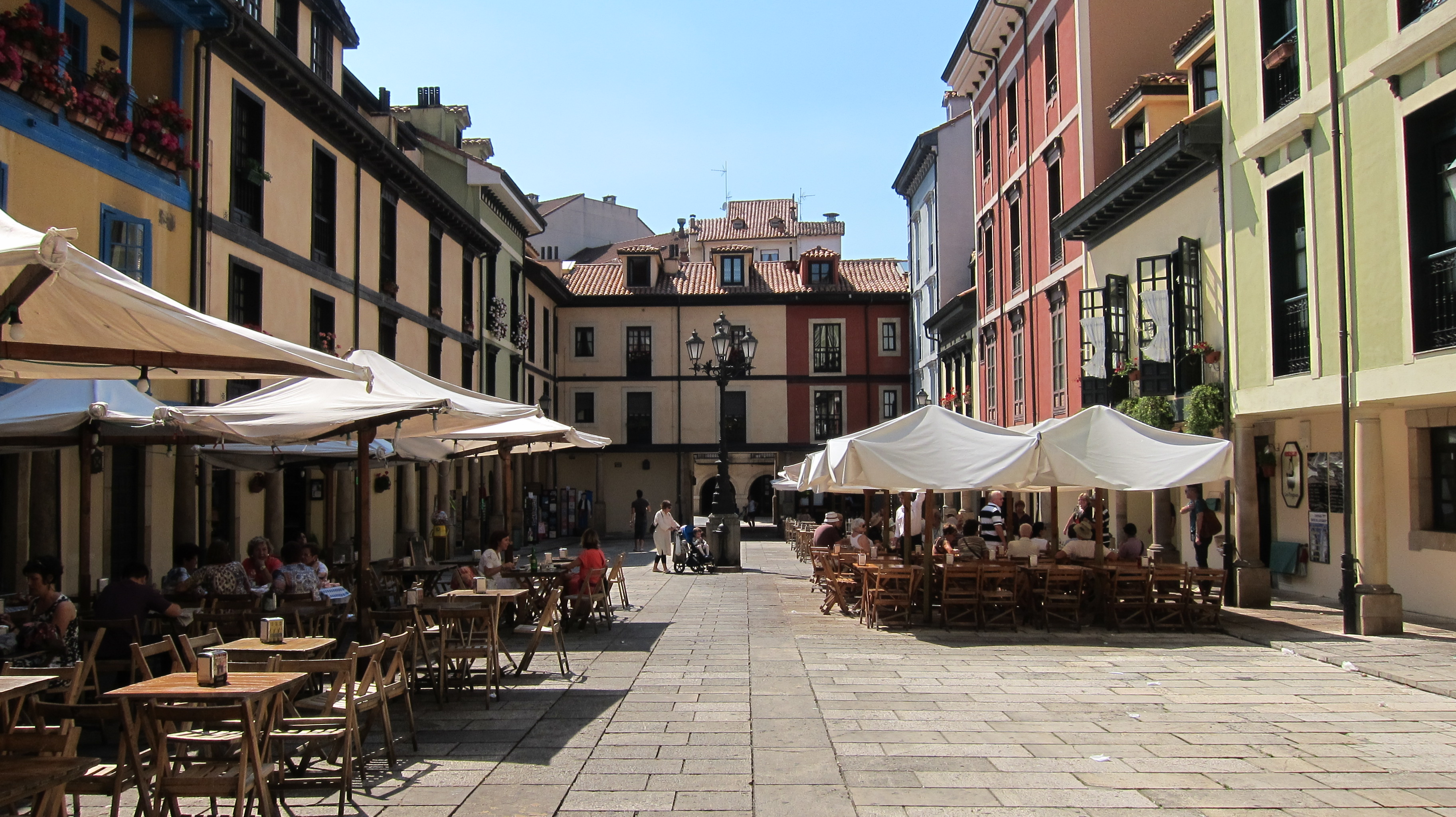
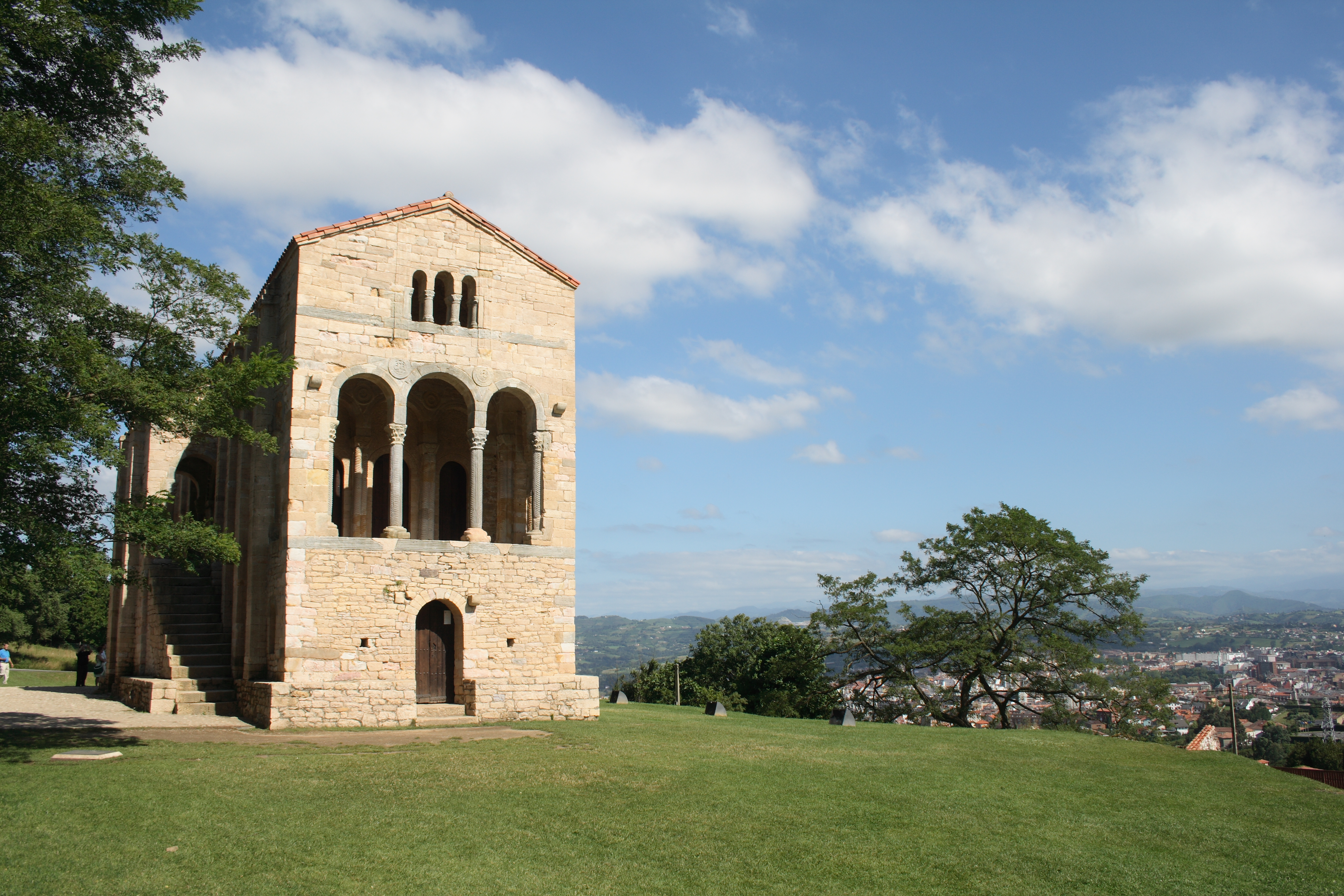
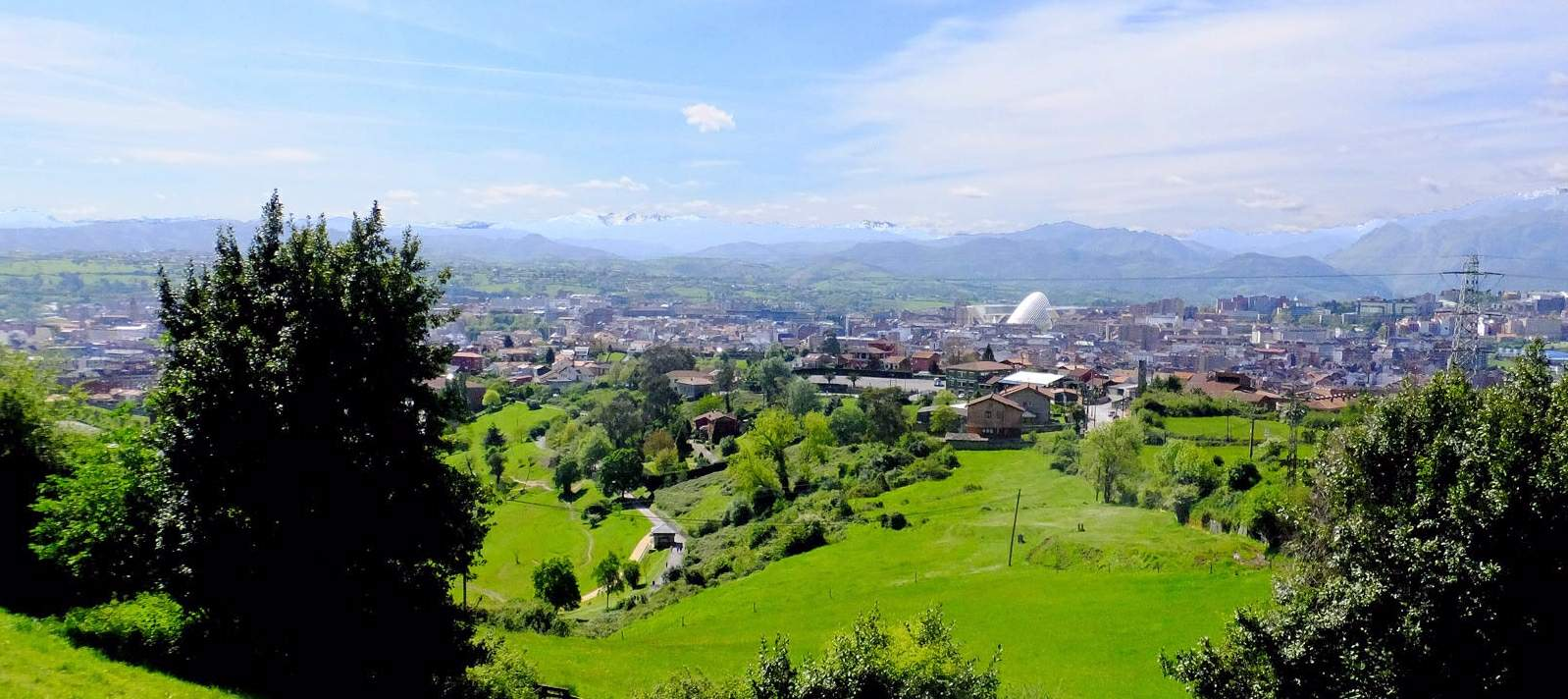
- Cathedral of the Holy Saviour Campoamor Theatre Asturian parliament Fontán Square St Mary at Naranco View from Naranco mountain

- Flag Coat of arms
- Motto: Benemérita, invicta, heroica, buena, muy noble, muy leal (Meritorious, undefeated, heroic, good, very noble, very loyal)
- Location of Oviedo
- Interactive map of Oviedo
- Coordinates: 43°21′36″N 5°50′42″W
- Country: Spain
- Autonomous community: Asturias
- Comarca: Oviedo
- Established: 761 AD
- Districts: 5 urban districts, 3 rural districts

Government
  - Type: Ayuntamiento
  - Body: Ayuntamiento de Oviedo
  - Mayor: Alfredo Canteli (2019) (PP)

Area
  - Total: 186.10 km^{2} (71.85 sq mi)
- Elevation: 232 m (761 ft)
- Highest elevation (Pico Escobín): 714 m (2,343 ft)

Population (2025)
  - Total: 223,576
  - Rank: 24th in Spain; 2nd in Asturias
  - Density: 1,201.4/km^{2} (3,111.5/sq mi)
- Demonym(s): Oviedan ovetense uvieín/a carbayón (col.)
- Time zone: UTC+1 (CET)
  - Summer (DST): UTC+2 (CEST)
- Postal code: 33001–33013
- INE code: 33033
- Website: www.oviedo.es

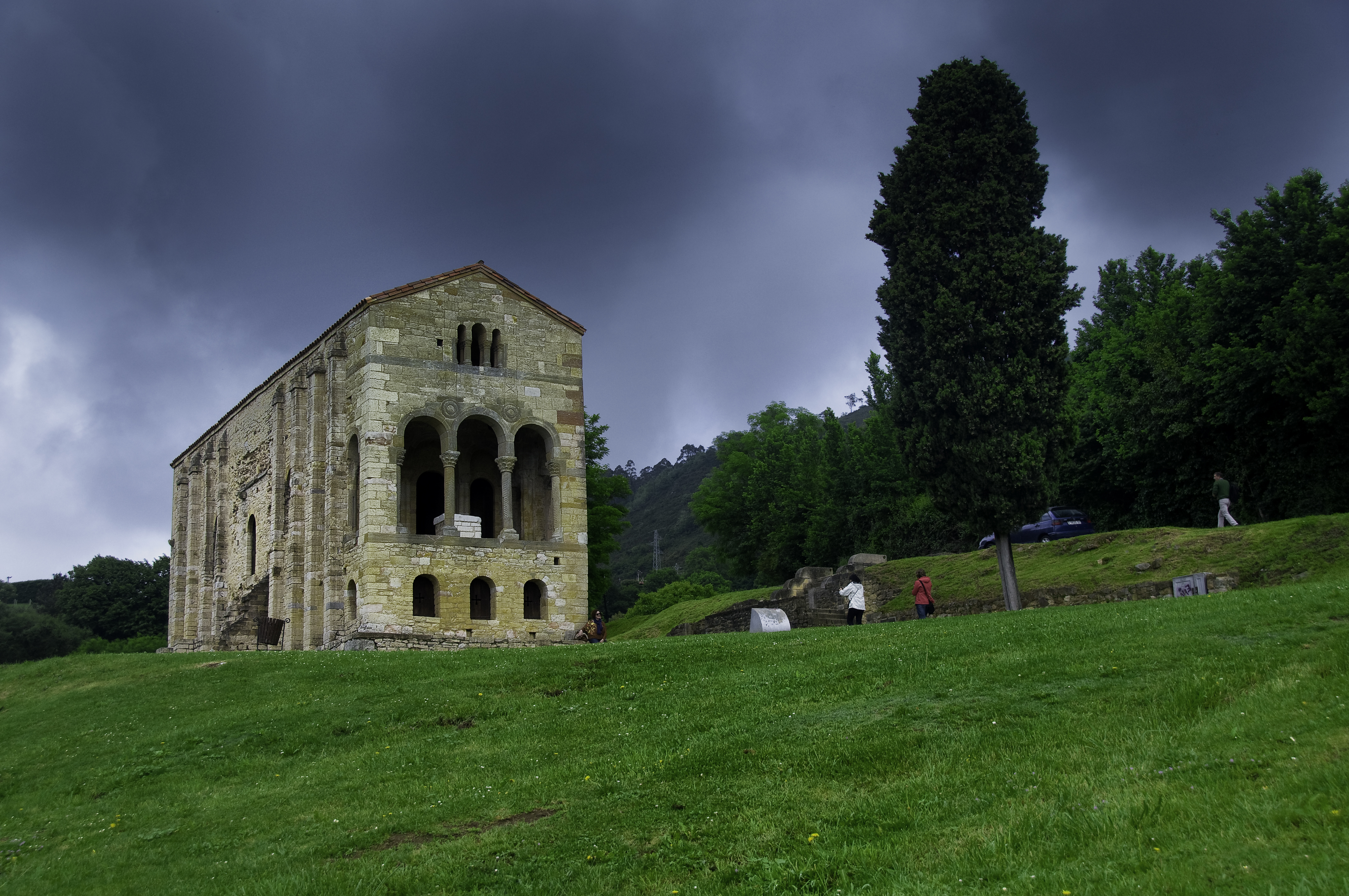
Santa María del Naranco (Pre-Romanesque shrine)

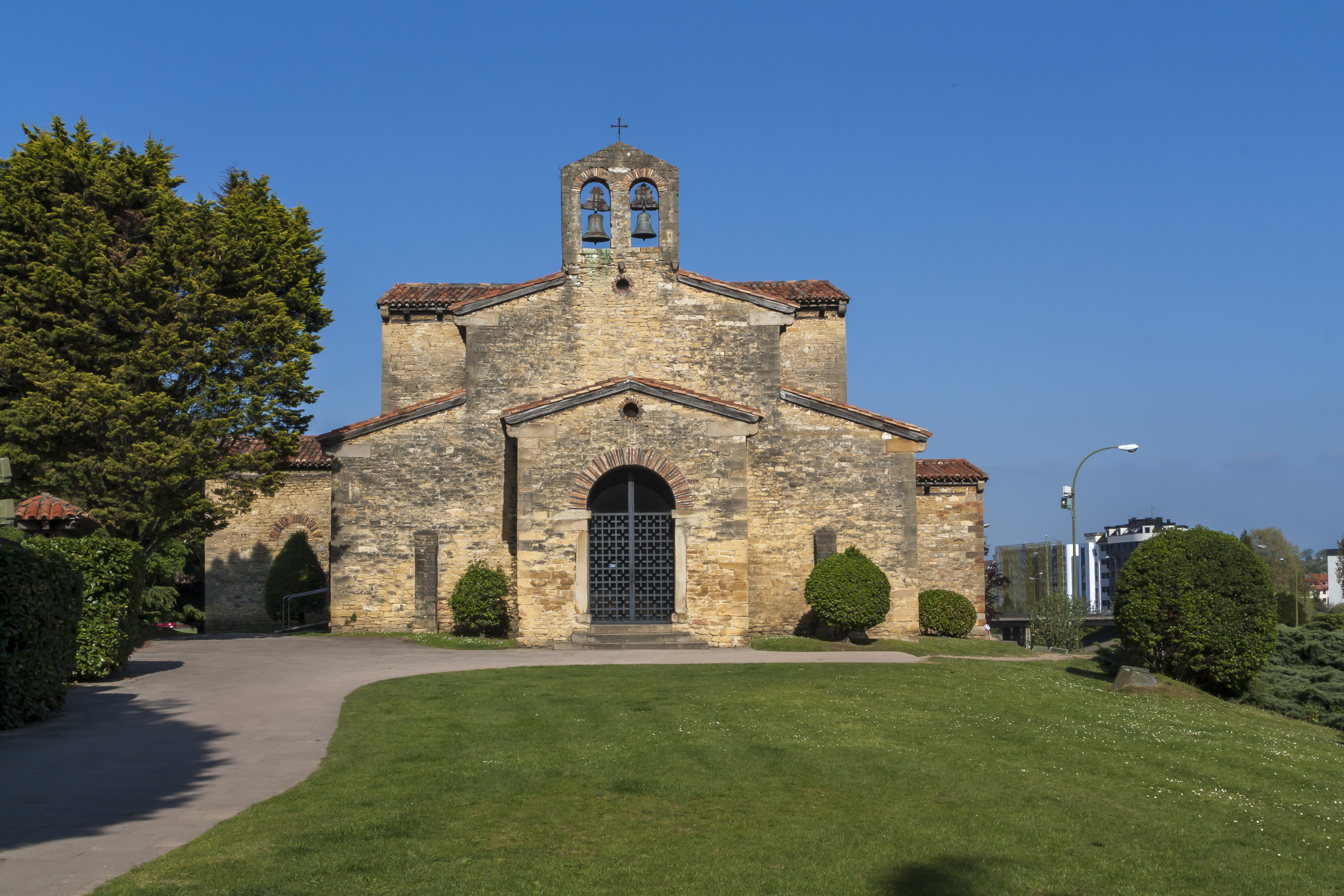
San Julián de los Prados (Pre-Romanesque shrine)

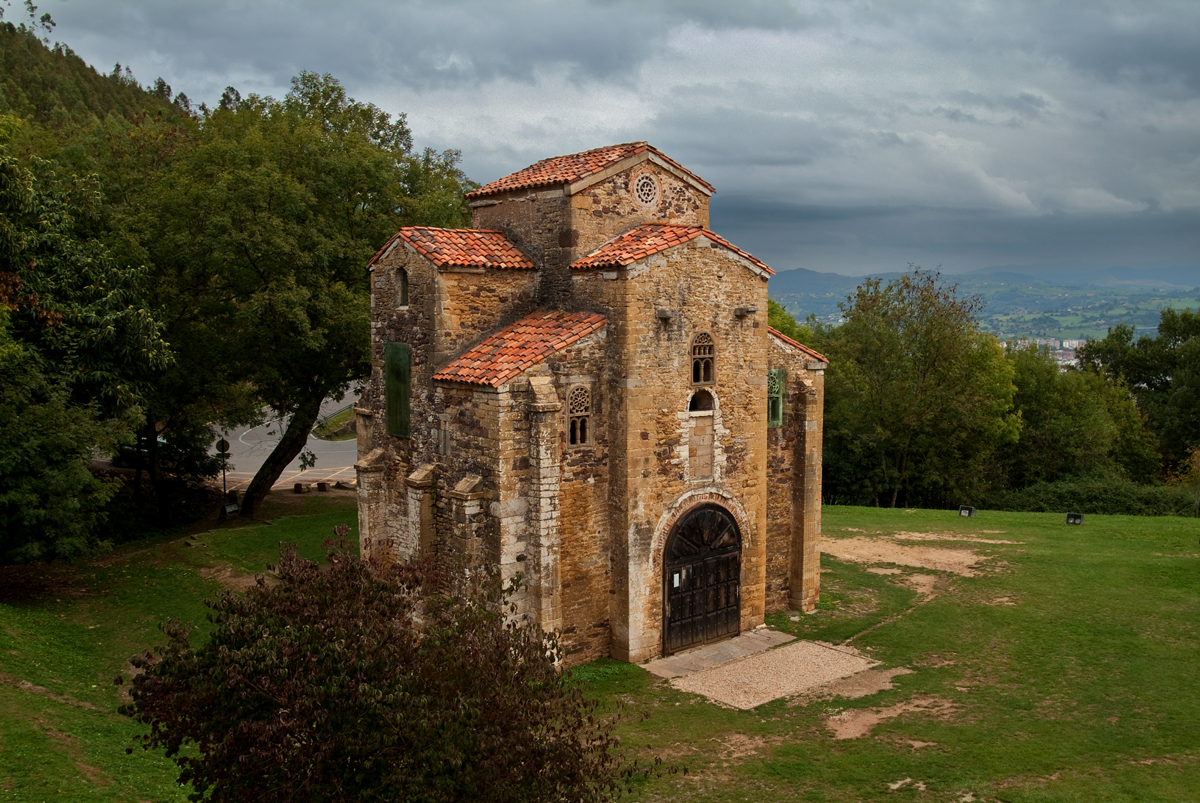
San Miguel de Lillo (Pre-Romanesque shrine)

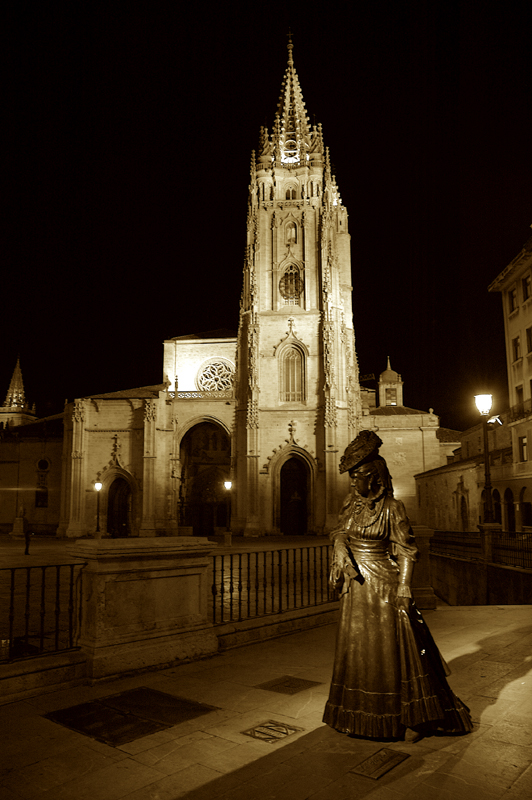
Cathedral of San Salvador (founded in 781 AD), and the Statue of La Regenta

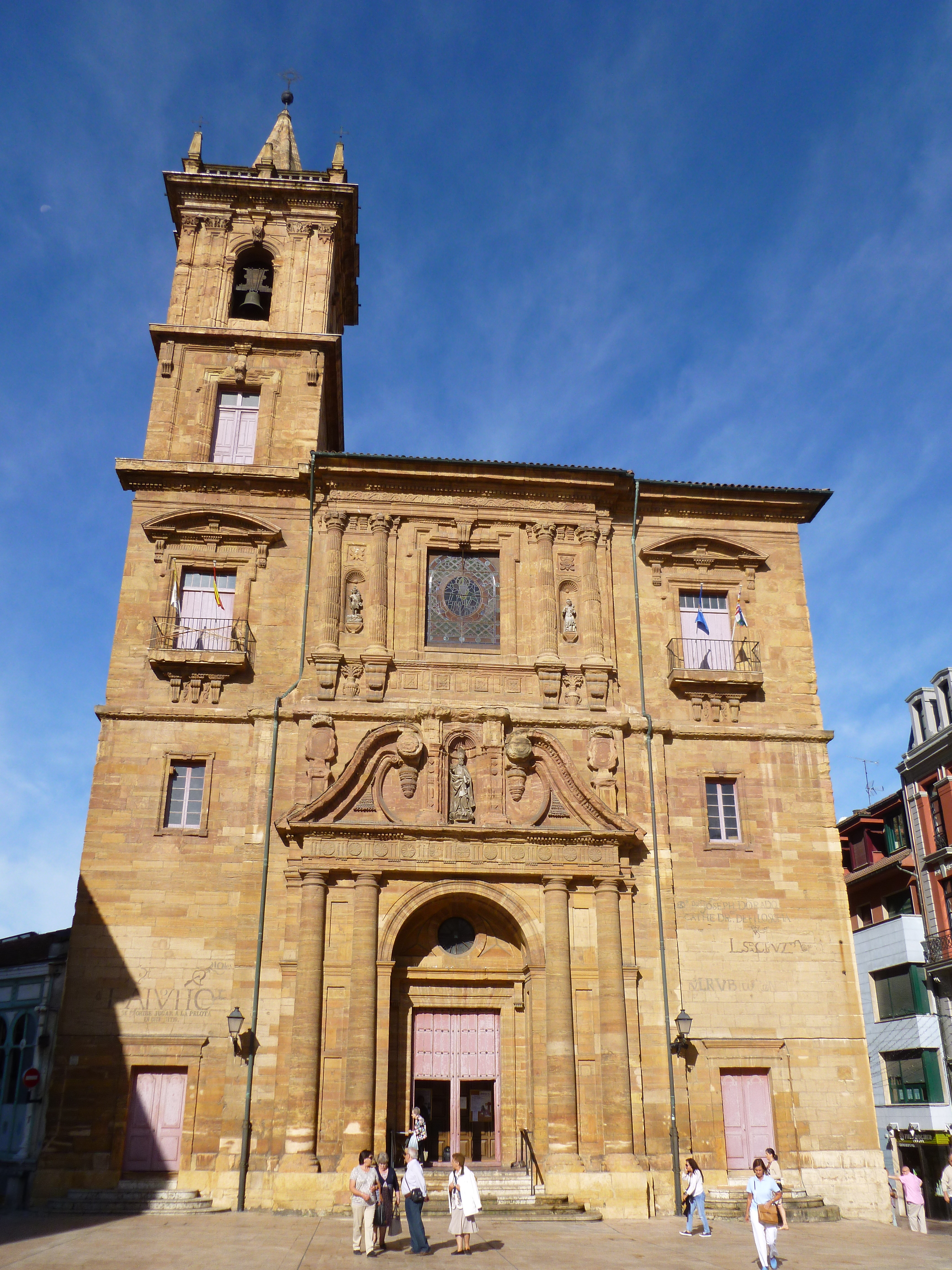
San Isidoro El Real Church

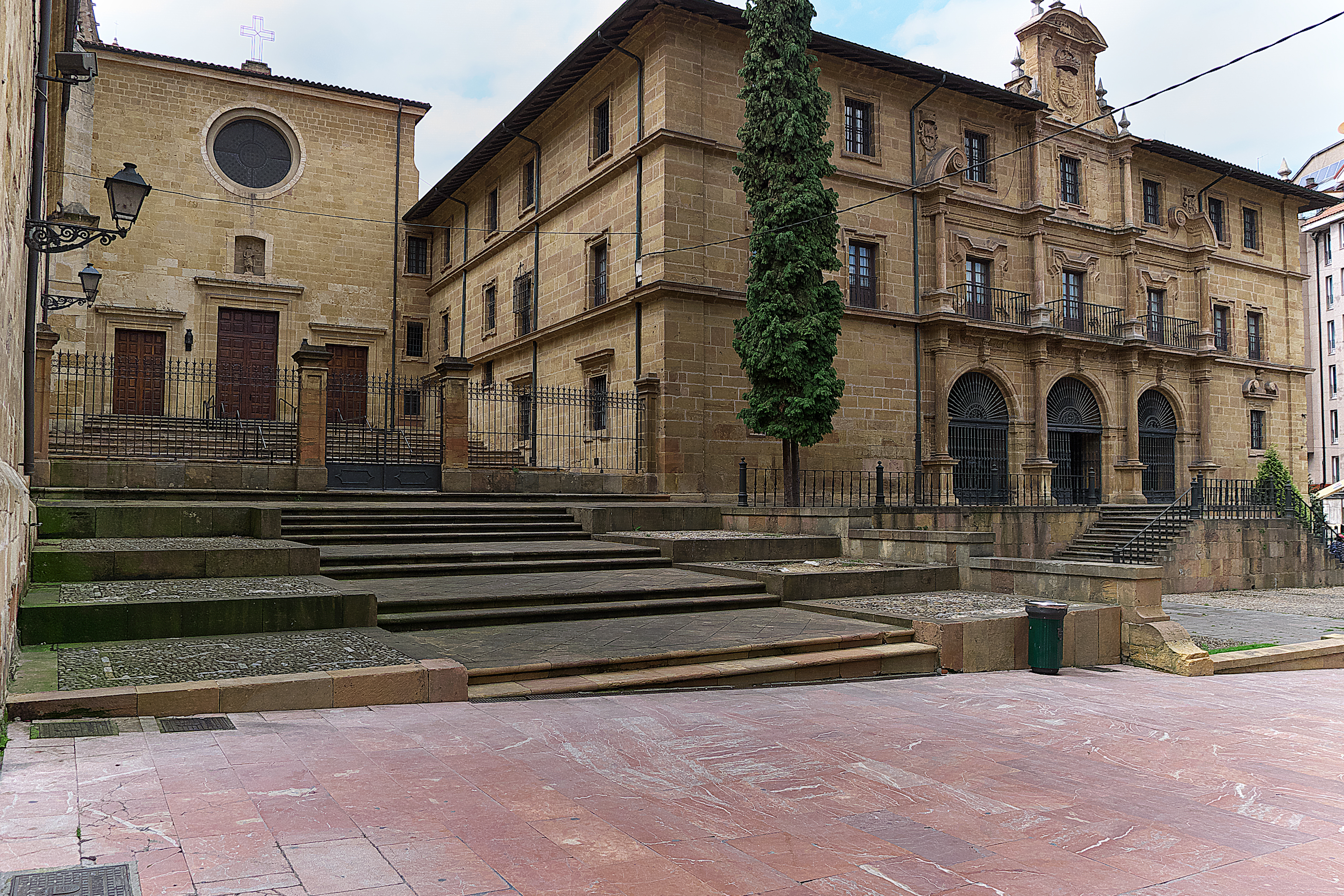
San Pelayo Monastery

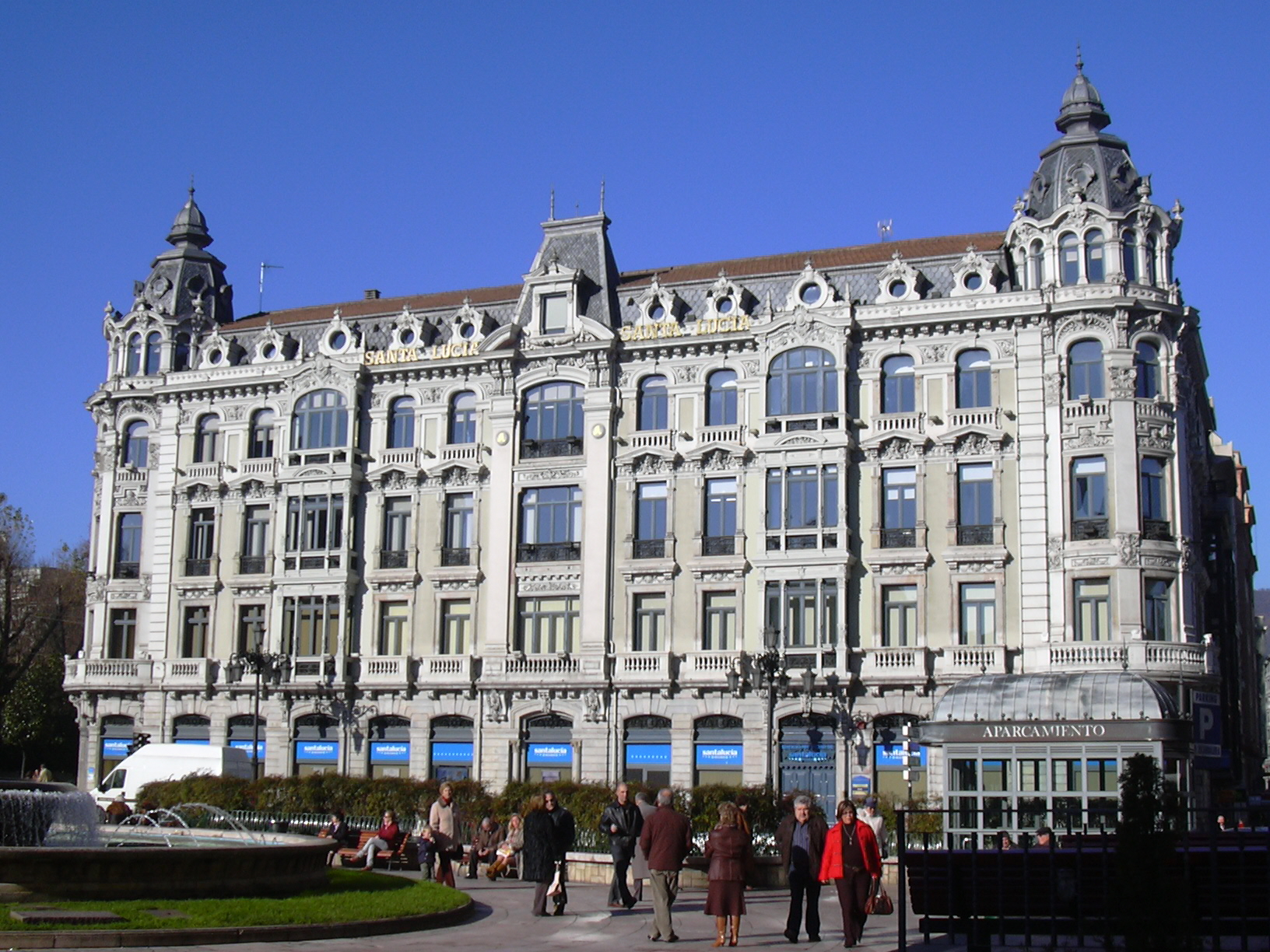
Building at Plaza de La Escandalera

Oviedo (Spanish: [oˈβjeðo]), officially known by the bilingual name Oviedo / Uviéu (Asturian: [uˈβjew], locally Uvieo [uˈβje.o]) is the capital city of the Principality of Asturias in northern Spain, and the administrative and commercial centre of the region. With a population of 223,576, it is also the 2nd-largest city in Asturias.

Oviedo is located approximately 24 km (15 mi) southwest of Gijón and 23 km (14 mi) southeast of Avilés, both of which lie on the shoreline of the Bay of Biscay. Oviedo's proximity to the ocean of less than 30 kilometres (19 mi) in combination with its elevated position with areas of the city more than 300 metres above sea level causes the city to have a maritime climate.

== History ==
The Kingdom of Asturias began in 720, with the Visigothic aristocrat Pelagius's (685–737) revolt against the Muslims, who at the time were occupying most of the Iberian Peninsula. The Moorish invasion that began in 711 had taken control of most of the peninsula, until the revolt in the northern mountains by Pelagius.

The resulting Kingdom of Asturias, located in an economically poor region of Iberia, was largely ignored by the Muslims. In 720, the area where Oviedo is now located was still uninhabited.

It is said that two monks, Máximo and Fromestano (Latin: Maximus et Fromestanus), founded the city in 761. That settlement was soon to be completed with the construction of a small church dedicated to Saint Vincent. Oviedo was established on an uninhabited hillside, with no Visigothic or Roman foundation before it became an Asturian city. Following Pelagius, who died in 737, Alfonso I (739–57) founded a dynasty that reigned until 1037. The Asturian Kingdom was on hostile terms with southern Moorish Spain. In 794, Oviedo was sacked and pillaged by Emir Hisham I in one of his numerous campaigns against the Christian kingdoms.

King Alfonso I is said to have "set in place the whole order of the Goths, as it had been in Toledo, as much in the church as in the palace." His intention with Oviedo was to shape it into a city similar to that of Visigothic Toledo. Once kings had settled in Oviedo, they adopted much of the architectural style and imagery of Toledo. But Oviedo did not necessarily resemble the old Visigothic capital in Toledo. The churches and buildings of Oviedo instead follow late provincial Roman tradition. Since Asturias at the time was an agriculturally poor area of Spain, the scale of the monumental buildings is quite impressive.

Oviedo's rich architectural tradition began with King Fruela I (757–768). King Fruela I of Asturias, the fourth of the Asturian monarchs, was the first decided promoter of the city: he constructed both a palace and a nearby church. This church was later restored by Alfonso II. Oviedo owes to a later king, Alfonso II The Chaste (791–842), its establishment as a capital city and ruling seat. The court was moved here from Pravia and the creation of the Pilgrim's Route to Santiago de Compostela was a major event in the history of Oviedo. It resulted in a church dedicated to The Saviour, the Cathedral of San Salvador. Together with a royal palace, these buildings formed the nucleus of Oviedo. Also constructed during Alfonso II's reign was San Julian de los Prados church, today one of the best preserved Asturian churches.

Alfonso II's successor, Ramiro I (842–850), continued Alfonso II's construction streak. Ramiro I constructed two buildings, Church Santa Maria del Naranco and San Miguel de Lillo. Church Santa Maria de Naranco was likely originally planned as Ramiro I's palace and later changed into a church. By this time the Court of the Palace was centered in Oviedo, which was the main royal residence. This court was controlled by members of the Asturian nobility.

Ramiro I's (842–850) eight-year tenure was uneasy; he faced rebellions from the Counts of the Palace. The first rebellion against Ramiro I was led by Alroitus, and the second rebellion was led by Piniolus. Both of these rebellions were unsuccessful in removing Ramiro I. These rebellions may have been why Ramiro I built his palace in the mountains surrounding Oviedo, presumably away from the violence.

During the 9th century in Oviedo, Roman style property law was common. 9th century documents indicate small scale aristocracies across the kingdom, as well as a large presence of a landowning peasantry.

Following Ramiro I's reign, Ordoño I (850–866) came into power and began the Asturian kings' father-son succession. Ordoño I was the first king to push southwards into Arab territory. Following Ordoño I's death on 27 May 866, usurpers attempted to take the throne. The following king Alfonso III (866–910), who was thirteen at the time, took refuge in Castile until his followers had killed the usurper.

Alfonso III's contributions to building construction are not nearly as well documented as those of Ramiro I or Alfonso II. The Chronicle of Alfonso III does not mention any buildings created by Alfonso III, nor does the Chronicle of Albelda.

In 882, the body of the Cordoban martyr Eulogius was sent to Oviedo. This was meant as a diplomatic gift from Emir Muhammad I (852–886). Eulogius was executed in 859. The body was probably accompanied by Eulogius's book collection. The only surviving manuscript of Eulogius's writings was discovered in the 16th century in Oviedo Cathedral Library. Here it was copied once before it disappeared completely from the library.

Following an offensive in 881 against an Umayyad army, Alfsonso III returned to Oviedo to rebuild churches. It was at this time that he constructed one or more palaces. The Chronicle of Albelda and the Chronicle of Sampiro tie Alfonso III's victories in battle to his program of church building in Oviedo. In 908, Alfonso III commissioned a gold and jewelled cross to contain the cross carried by Pelagius I at Covadonga. This "Cross of Victory" is located in the Camara Sancta in the Oviedo Cathedral. However, 21st century Carbon14 analysis of the wooden cross indicates that it was no older than the golden casing created to surround the cross. The commission of the casing shows us Alfonso III's interest in perpetuating the legend of Pelagius I.

Towards the end of Alfonso III's reign, he faced many challenges. In 901, a prophet named Alhaman led a "great army of Muslims" and attempted to take Zamora. To add to this, Alfonso III's brother Vermudo revolted in Astorga. Several attempts were made on the aging Alfonso III's life by his sons, who finally overthrew him. After he died in Zamora, his body was taken to Oviedo for burial.

The moving of the royal court to León, after the death of Alfonso III, 'The Great', links the life of the city to the relics preserved in its cathedral and the passing of pilgrims that visit El Salvador, and continue on their way to Santiago de Compostela. Kings spent less and less time in Oviedo following the change, and spent more time in the rich Duero Plains. León was built up after it became the capital, and eventually surpassed Oviedo in terms of construction.

During the 12th century, many Royal Charters were fabricated by Bishop Pelayo de Oviedo, "el fabulador" ("the fabulist"). Since there were few checks on internal bookkeeping in the kingdom, actions like this had become commonplace throughout Asturias. When original documents faded, they were copied onto cartularies and often with alterations that suited the needs of those who copied the documents. The most glaring example can be seen in the Liber Testamentorum, which was compiled by Bishop Pelayo de Oviedo in 1109. This document contained many confirmation rights and property rights of the Oviedo cathedral by Asturian and Leonese kings. Bishop Pelayo's intent behind this was to try to gain the independence of his see from the archbishop of Toledo or Santiago, as well as to promote Oviedo as a pilgrim destination. According to Sánchez-Albornoz, "He (Bishop Pelayo) always, always, always falsified." It is assumed that Bishop Pelayo never committed forgery for enjoyment, but primarily to promote the church of Oviedo.

The following centuries (12th–16th) witness the development of the medieval city, the outlines of which are still preserved today, the construction of the city walls, a devastating fire which took place on Christmas Eve in 1521, and the aqueduct works, Los Pilares, constructed in order to provide the city with water throughout the 16th century. The city had a Jewish community, and after the expulsion of Spain's Jews in 1492, Oviedo was included in a royal investigation into the smuggling of Jewish property.

The foundation of the Arts College (University of Oviedo) by Fernando de Valdés Salas, at the beginning of the 17th century, opened Oviedo to a progressive urban expansion. Further impulse was in the 18th century by the regional nobility and the construction of remarkable palaces; in the 19th century by industrial growth and the suburban development of Uría Street; and finally in the 20th century by administrative and commercial development.

In October 1934, there was a left-wing revolt against the conservative government, based in several cities. In Asturias, the fighting developed into a small, short-lived civil war: the Asturian miners' strike of 1934. 50,000 workers, mostly miners, armed themselves with dynamite and captured Oviedo after heavy fighting. They gained control of the arsenal with 30,000 rifles and machine guns. The Army Chief of Staff, General Francisco Franco sent in soldiers who overpowered the rebels after severe street fighting that left 3,000 rebels dead and 7,000 wounded. The cathedral was badly damaged, with its eighth-century chapel blown up by a mine. In the aftermath, many false atrocity stories circulated.

The Siege of Oviedo in 1936 was a memorable event in the Spanish Civil War. The army garrison rose in support of the Nationalist coup d'état and withstood a siege of three months by an improvised Republican force until relieved in 1937.

== Geography ==
Oviedo is located in the centre of Asturias between the Nalón River and Nora River. To the north lie Las Regueras and Llanera, to the south Mieres del Camino and Ribera de Arriba, to the east Siero and Langreo, and to the west Grado and Santo Adriano. The altitude of Oviedo is between 80 and 709 metres above sea level. The city is protected against strong winds by Monte Naranco in the north and the Sierra del Aramo in the south. The city centre is rather hilly.

Orthophotomaps of Oviedo
Oviedo city center

West Oviedo

East Oviedo

=== Parishes ===
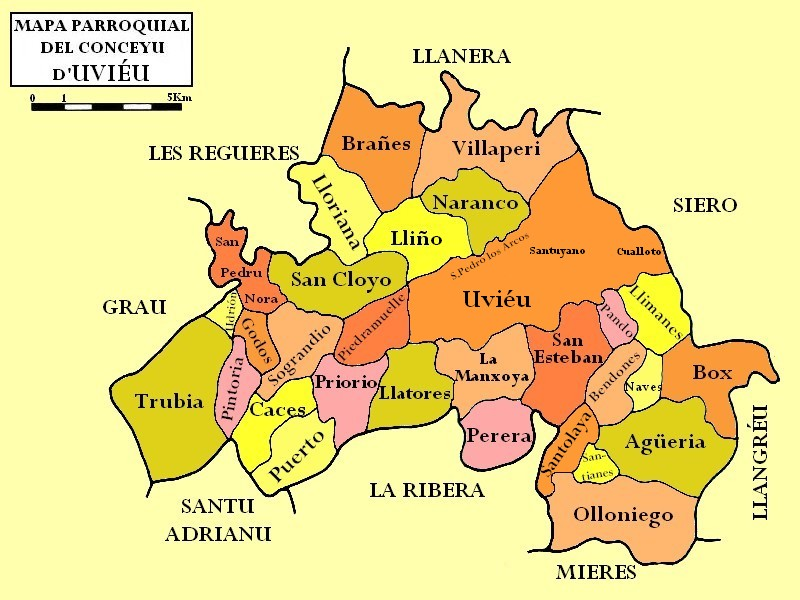
Map with the parishes of Oviedo.

- Trubia
- Colloto (divided between two municipalities: Oviedo and Siero)
- San Claudio
- San Esteban de les Cruces
- Latores
- Olloniego

=== Climate ===
Oviedo's climate is oceanic (Cfb in the Köppen climate classification). Its climate is very similar to neighbouring city Gijón, with only slightly wider fluctuations in temperature due to its higher altitude and more inland location. Oviedo's warmest month is in August with an average high of 23.7 °C (74.7 °F). The city centre is located at a lower elevation than the weather station so is probably somewhat milder year-round since both are located in an upwards gradient away from the sea. Its maritime position renders winters much milder than in continental Spain such as in the Madrid capital region, but summers naturally are far less hot than in the interior. There is a slight drying tendency during summer, albeit less than in other areas of Spain.

Climate data for Oviedo, altitude 336 m (1,102 ft) (1991-2020), extremes (1972-2023)
Month	Jan	Feb	Mar	Apr	May	Jun	Jul	Aug	Sep	Oct	Nov	Dec	Year
Record high °C (°F)	23.4 (74.1)	24.6 (76.3)	28.0 (82.4)	31.5 (88.7)	32.4 (90.3)	35.5 (95.9)	39.0 (102.2)	41.2 (106.2)	36.4 (97.5)	31.7 (89.1)	26.6 (79.9)	23.0 (73.4)	41.2 (106.2)
Mean daily maximum °C (°F)	12.1 (53.8)	12.8 (55.0)	15.0 (59.0)	16.2 (61.2)	18.7 (65.7)	21.1 (70.0)	23.0 (73.4)	23.7 (74.7)	22.0 (71.6)	19.0 (66.2)	14.4 (57.9)	12.5 (54.5)	17.5 (63.6)
Daily mean °C (°F)	8.4 (47.1)	8.7 (47.7)	10.6 (51.1)	11.7 (53.1)	14.3 (57.7)	16.9 (62.4)	18.8 (65.8)	19.4 (66.9)	17.6 (63.7)	14.8 (58.6)	10.8 (51.4)	9.0 (48.2)	13.4 (56.1)
Mean daily minimum °C (°F)	4.8 (40.6)	4.7 (40.5)	6.2 (43.2)	7.3 (45.1)	9.8 (49.6)	12.6 (54.7)	14.7 (58.5)	15.0 (59.0)	13.2 (55.8)	10.6 (51.1)	7.2 (45.0)	5.4 (41.7)	9.3 (48.7)
Record low °C (°F)	−6.0 (21.2)	−3.8 (25.2)	−3.6 (25.5)	−1.7 (28.9)	1.6 (34.9)	5.6 (42.1)	7.4 (45.3)	8.6 (47.5)	5.2 (41.4)	1.0 (33.8)	−4.2 (24.4)	−3.6 (25.5)	−6.0 (21.2)
Average precipitation mm (inches)	102 (4.0)	89 (3.5)	88 (3.5)	97 (3.8)	80 (3.1)	62 (2.4)	44 (1.7)	57 (2.2)	66 (2.6)	104 (4.1)	134 (5.3)	105 (4.1)	1,028 (40.3)
Average precipitation days (≥ 1 mm)	12.3	10.1	10.8	12.1	11.5	8.9	7.2	7.7	8.0	11.6	13.5	11.6	125.3
Average snowy days	1.1	1.6	0.7	0.2	0	0	0	0	0	0	0.1	0.5	4.2
Average relative humidity (%)	77	75	74	76	78	79	79	79	79	79	80	77	78
Mean monthly sunshine hours	112	124	158	165	177	171	177	183	174	146	108	108	1,803
Source: Agencia Estatal de Meteorología

== Politics ==
The current mayor is Alfredo Canteli (PP).

=== Councillors distribution in local elections ===
Councilors for Oviedo since 1979
Key to parties Somos PCA–PCE IU–IX ASCIZ PSOE UCD Cs CDS CD FAC PP CP AP Vox
Election	Distribution	Mayor
1979	2 / 11 / 12 / 2	Luis Riera Posada (UCD)
1983	1 / 13 / 13	Antonio Masip Hidalgo (PSOE)
1987	1 / 12 / 4 / 10	Antonio Masip Hidalgo (PSOE)
1991	2 / 10 / 2 / 13	Gabino de Lorenzo (PP) resigned January 2012
1995	3 / 6 / 18	Gabino de Lorenzo (PP) resigned January 2012
1999	2 / 10 / 15	Gabino de Lorenzo (PP) resigned January 2012
2003	2 / 8 / 17	Gabino de Lorenzo (PP) resigned January 2012
2007	1 / 9 / 17	Gabino de Lorenzo (PP) resigned January 2012
2011	3 / 6 / 7 / 11	Gabino de Lorenzo (PP) resigned January 2012
2011	3 / 6 / 7 / 11	Agustín Iglesias Caunedo (PP) from January 2012
2015	3 / 6 / 5 / 2 / 11	Wenceslao López Martínez (PSOE)
2019	3 / 8 / 5 / 9 / 2	Alfredo Canteli Fernández (PP)
2023	3 / 7 / 14 / 3	Alfredo Canteli Fernández (PP)

== Demographics ==
Historical population
Year	Pop.	±%
1842	23,603	—
1857	29,777	+26.2%
1877	35,983	+20.8%
1887	44,814	+24.5%
1900	48,374	+7.9%
1910	54,572	+12.8%
1920	70,096	+28.4%
1930	76,147	+8.6%
1940	79,287	+4.1%
1950	100,813	+27.1%
1960	124,407	+23.4%
1970	152,453	+22.5%
1981	184,473	+21.0%
1991	196,051	+6.3%
2001	201,154	+2.6%
2011	225,005	+11.9%
2021	217,164	−3.5%
Source: INE

As of 2025, the population is 223,576, of which 46.4% are males, and 53.6% are females. Minors make up 13.6% of the population, and seniors make up 25.8%.

=== Immigration ===
As of 2025, immigrants make up 16.4% of the population. The 5 largest foreign countries of birth are Colombia, Venezuela, Ecuador, Cuba, and Paraguay.

Foreign population by country of birth (2025)
Country	Population
Colombia	4,927
Venezuela	3,867
Ecuador	3,094
Cuba	2,363
Paraguay	1,991
Argentina	1,912
Romania	1,854
Morocco	1,480
Brazil	1,379
Dominican Republic	1,367
Peru	1,152
Russia	1,104
Mexico	855
Senegal	823
Ukraine	731

== Architecture ==
Oviedo contains a very rich architectural history, with many buildings dating back to the early medieval period. Many of the building projects were undertaken during Alfonso II's (791-842) reign and Ramiro I's (842-850) reign. Alfonso III's contributions are not as well documented.

Alfonso II is said to have built four churches, one dedicated to Christ the Saviour, the Blessed Virgin Mary, St. Tyrsus, and SS Julian and Basilissa. There are few traces of the churches dedicated to the Saviour, the Virgin Mary, and St. Tyrsus. The San Salvador church, which was dedicated to the Saviour, is probably beneath the Cathedral of Oviedo. The church of Santa Maria de la Corte, which was dedicated to the Virgin Mary, was demolished in 1702. As for St. Tyrsus, the church dedicated to him exists today as the church of San Tirso. Only a wall and a three light window are believed to have been built by Alfonso II, the majority of the rest of the church is dated to the 14th century. The best preserved church constructed during Alfonso II's time was San Julian de los Prados.

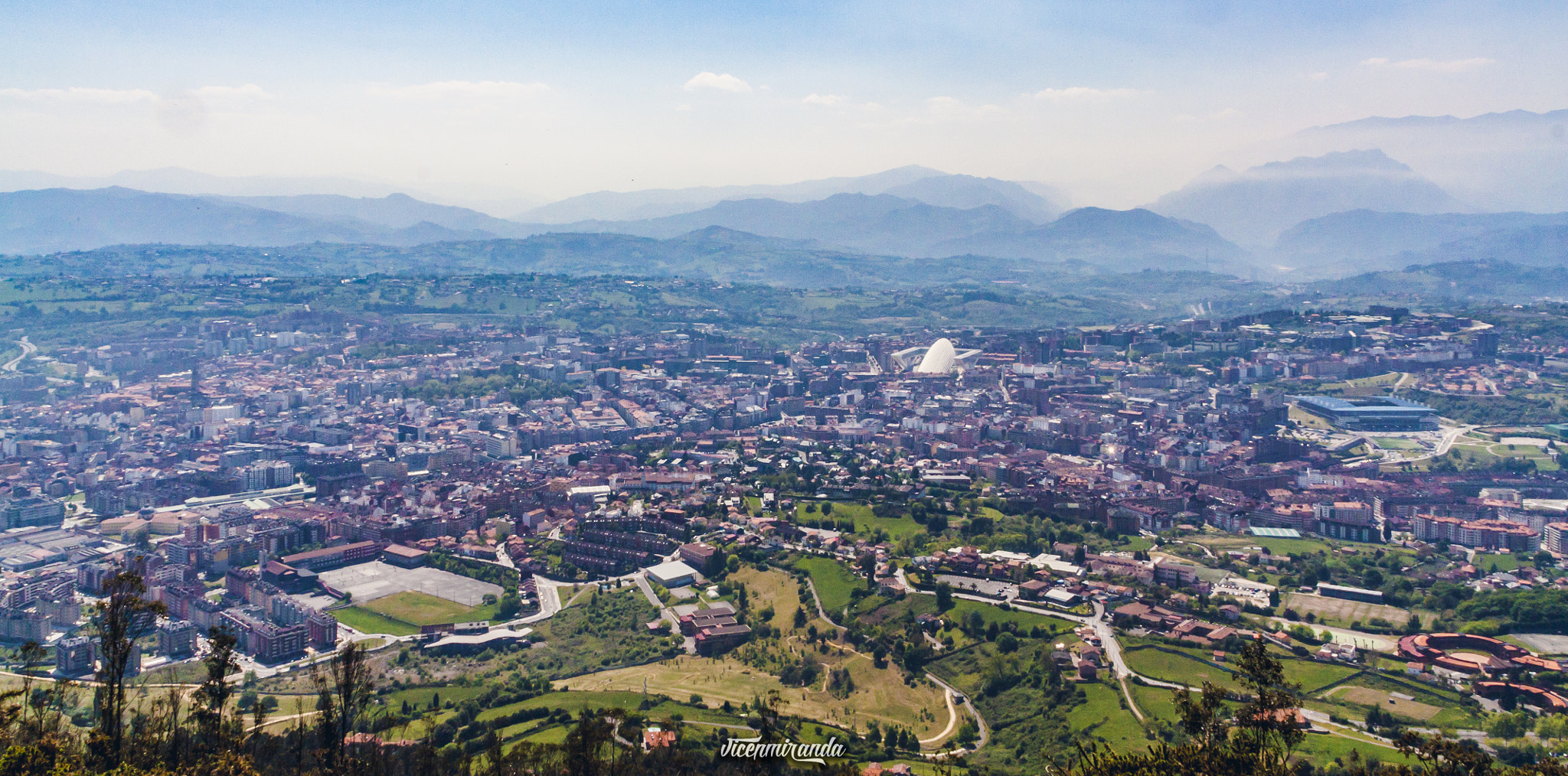
Panoramic view of Oviedo

Two buildings are said to have been built during Ramiro I's reign, one was a church dedicated to the Virgin Mary and the other construction was a palace. These were built just outside Oviedo, on Monte Lignum. The church Santa Maria de Naranco seems to originally have been a palace, but later repurposed into a church. The church has an atypical plan from other churches at its time, possibly because it was supposed to contain a throne room for the king. The other church built during Ramiro I's time was San Miguel de Lillo.

The Chronicle of Albelda, one of the primary sources used to discern which King commissioned which building, only extends to 883. Because of this, constructions undertaken during Alfonso III's time as king were not documented.

The following is a list of the notable architectural sites in Oviedo:

- Cathedral of San Salvador, was erected in 1388 over the previous cathedral, which was founded in the 8th century. The original church was built by Fruela I the Cruel (757), and then built upon by Alfonso II (791-842). The Tower on the south side of the church was erected in 1556. The north tower was never completed.
- Cámara Santa de Oviedo. Dating from 802. It is located within the Cathedral, attached to the southern transept of the cathedral, and it is a UNESCO World Heritage Site. Houses the Arca Santa chest reliquary of the Sudarium of Oviedo. The Cámara Sancta houses many Christian treasures. It contained the great gold and jeweled cross of victory for Alfonso III, which was made for housing a wooden cross used by the first Asturian king, Pelayo. The wooden cross was supposedly used in the Asturian victory at the battle of the Covadonga in 718. The Arca Sancta itself, which is covered with decorated silver plates, was commissioned by Alfonso VI (1072–1109).
- Santa María del Naranco Hall, 9th century. A relatively large pavilion, part of a palace complex built for the king Ramiro I.
- San Miguel de Lillo (small church), 9th century.
- Basilica of San Julián de los Prados. This church was originally constructed by Alfonso II (791-842), and is one of the best preserved Asturian churches. The church features a fresco decoration style. Although it was reported to have been placed near a palace, no trace of such palace has been found. Ideologically it would appear that church was opposed to religious imagery, which seems to parallel the iconoclast movement in the Byzantine Empire. However, there was no documentation of this ideal circulating in Spain at this point in time, so the Asturian stance on iconoclasm should not be inferred from this fact.
- La Foncalada. Fountain of the 9th century. It is the only preserved Pre-Romanesque civil work in the whole of Europe.
- The University of Oviedo was created in 1574, but only inaugurated on 21 September 1608, the feast of Saint Matthew. It was funded by the terms of the will of Archbishop D. Fernando Valdés Salas, minister and General Inquisitor under Charles V, Holy Roman Emperor and Philip II.
- Town Hall (Casa Consistorial). Dates from 1662.
- La Balesquida Chapel (13th century). Associated with Oviedo's taylors' guild. Repeatedly restored in the 17th, 19th and 20th centuries. It is dedicated to the Virgin of Hope.
- House of the Llanes (18th century). It is the best Baroque façade in the whole of Asturias.
- Deán Payarinos' House (20th century). A building on the Beaux Arts style. Nowadays, it houses the Eduardo Martínez Torner Conservatory.
- The Monastery of San Vicente (8th century). At the moment, home of the Archaeological Museum of Asturias.
- The Convent Church of Santo Domingo, Oviedo (16th century). One of the monastic settlements outside the city walls. The original building burnt down in 1934 and it was heavily reconstructed after the Civil War.
- El Fontán Market (17th-18th centuries). A simple but rather monumental complex; an 18th-century porticoed square, which housed the vegetable market. It fell victim to speculative manoeuvres. It was left to deteriorate on its own; claiming that it was beyond repair, it was then demolished in 1998 and rebuilt offering all modern amenities, but with its original proportions radically changed; the original complex being much lower than its modern replacement.
- Casas del Cuitu, early 20th century Art Nouveau apartment building.
- Palacio de Congresos de Oviedo projected by Santiago Calatrava.
- Church of San Tirso, or the Church of Saint Thyrsus, is located south west of the main cathedral. Only the east end of the church can trace its roots to Alfonso II's reign, with the rest of the church created during the 14th century. The triple arcaded window and east wall are the only portions of the church made during the early 9th century.
- Camposagrado Palace built in 1728 and 1744 combining baroque and neo-classical architectures. It is presently the home of the Regional Court of Asturias.

=== Plazas and squares ===
- Plaza de la Escandalera, located in the downtown area
- Plaza del Fontán, located in the old quarters of the city. It has been used as a marketplace for many centuries.
- Corrada del Obispo
- Plaza Porlier, located by the cathedral in the downtown area.

== Parks and gardens ==
The main parks and gardens in Oviedo are:

Park	Surface area (m²)
Parque Purificación Tomás (Monte Alto)	213,667
Parque de Invierno	194,608
Prados de la Fuente / Pista Finlandesa	171,966
Campo San Francisco	90,000
Parque del Oeste	82,032
Jardines del Campillín	12,505

== Culture ==
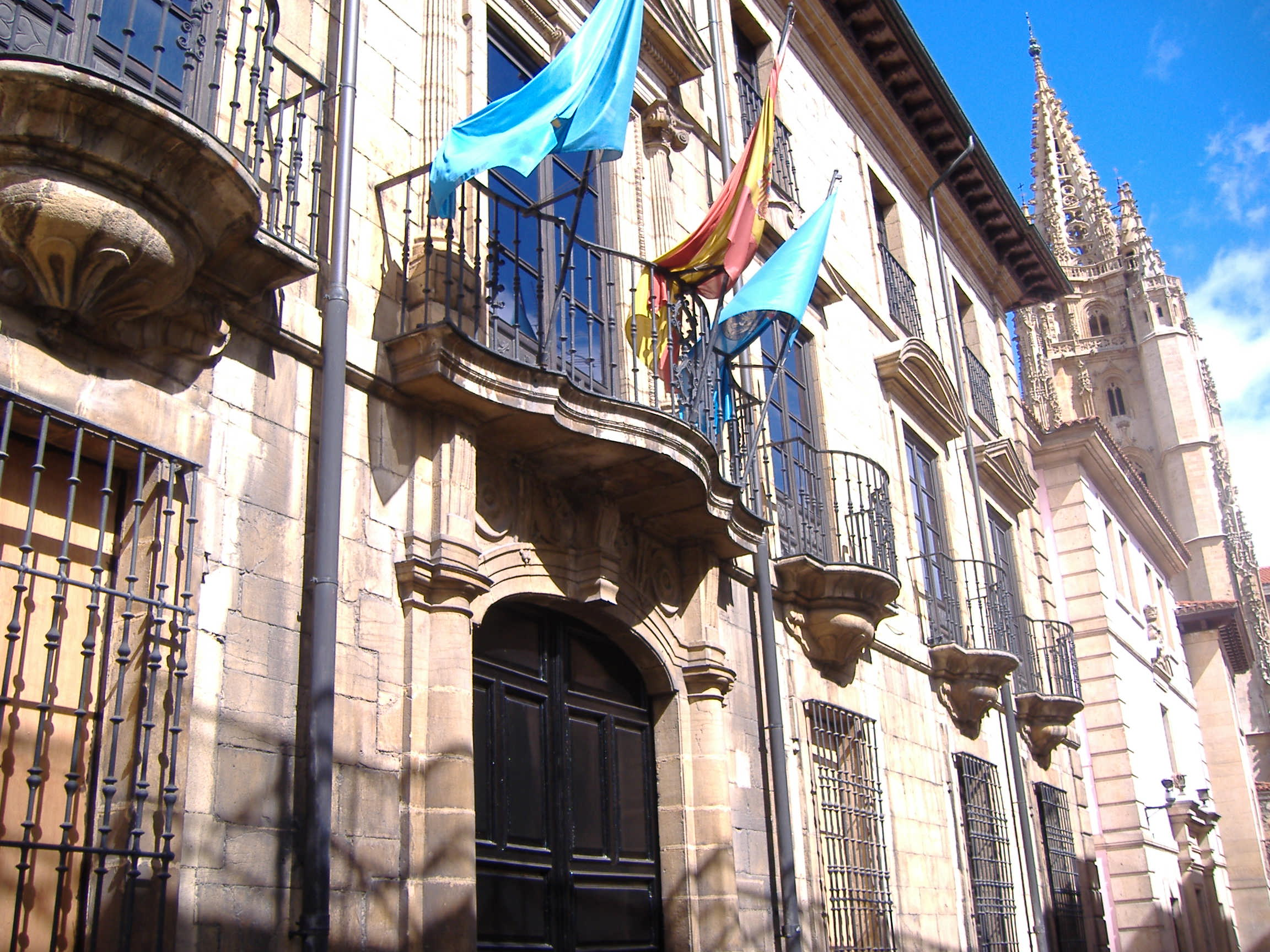
Museum of Fine Arts of Asturias

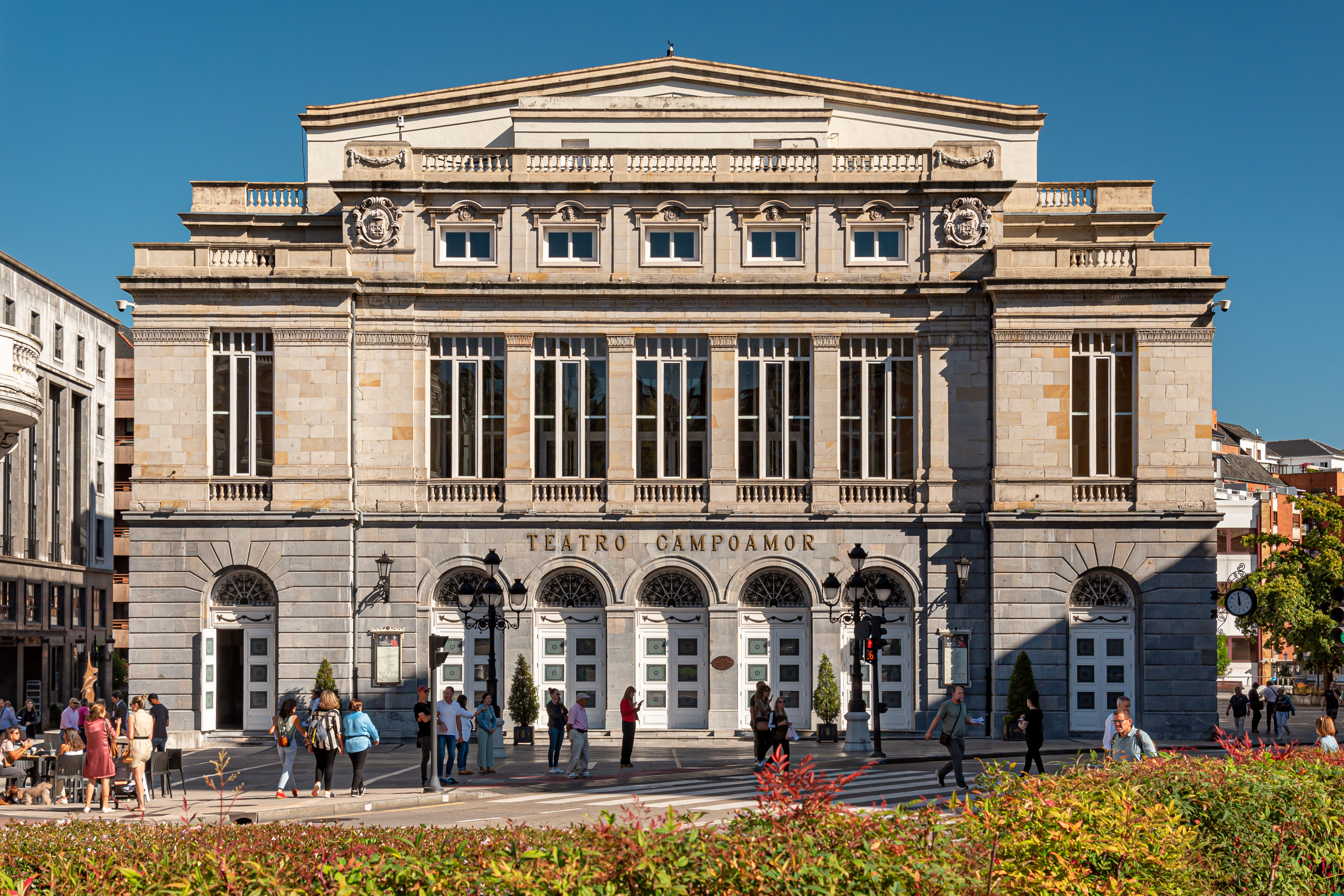
Campoamor Theatre

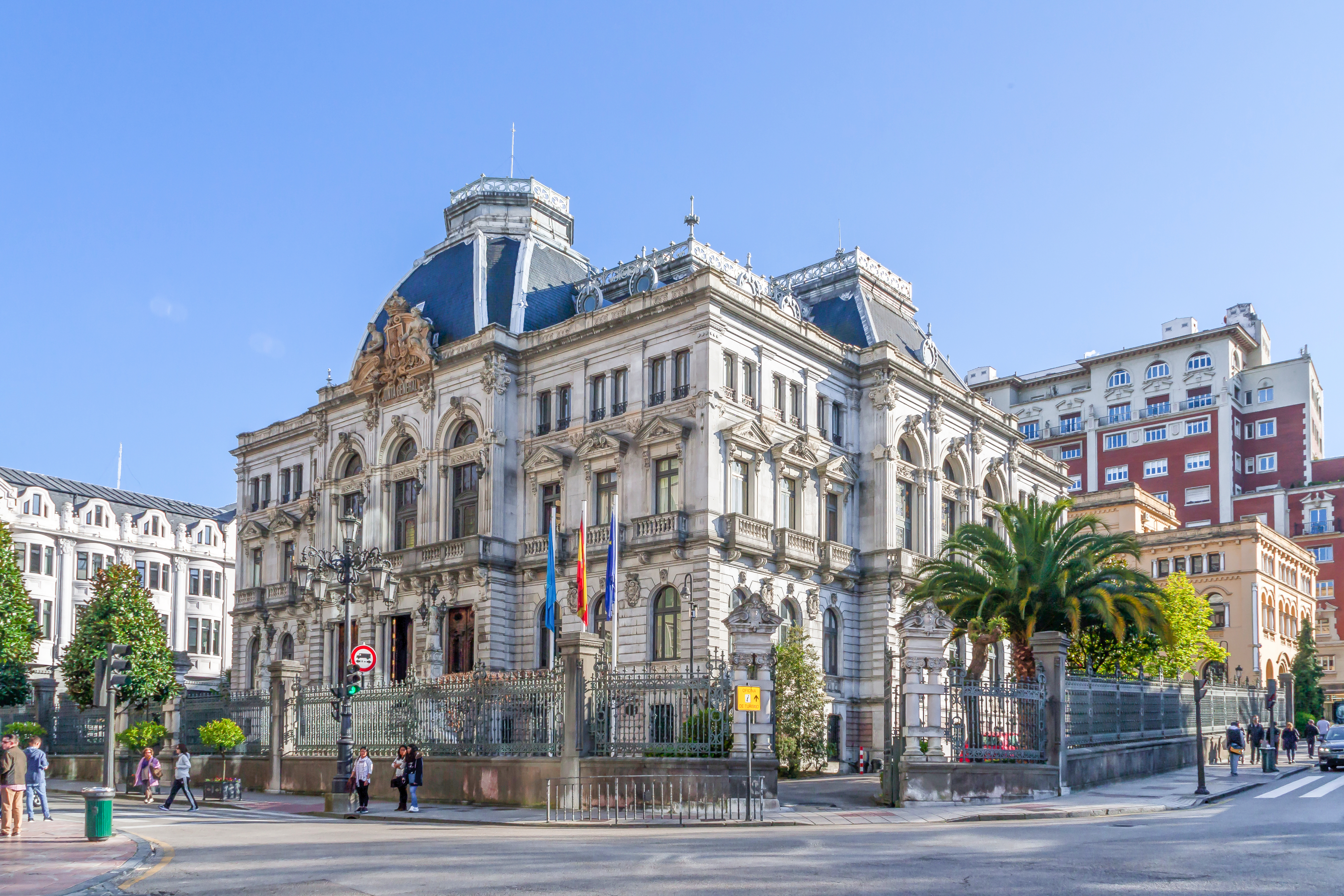
Parliament building of the Principality of Asturias

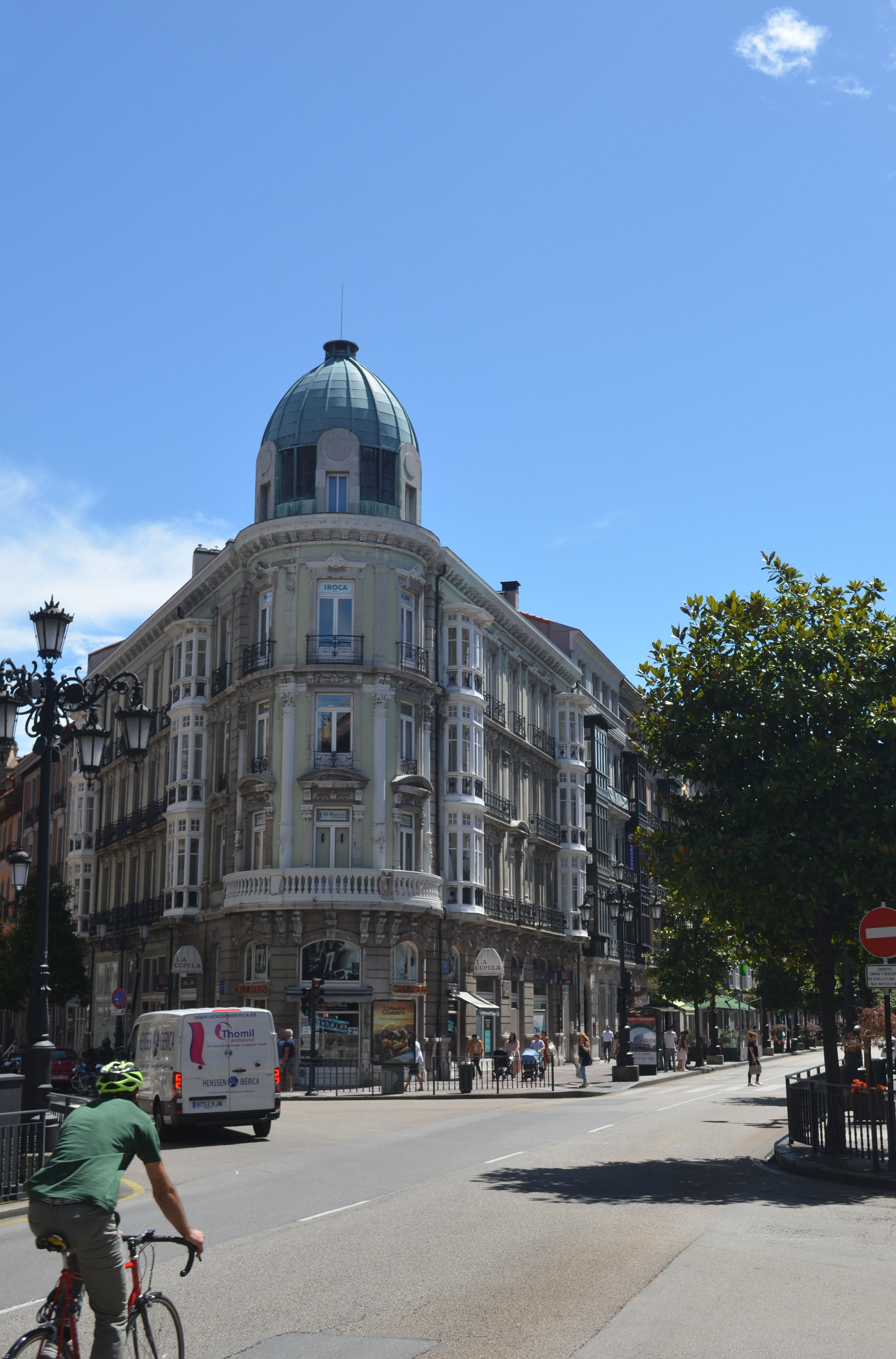
The Uria Street, city centre

Oviedo inspired the fictional city of Vetusta in Leopoldo Alas's La Regenta. Other Spanish writers were inspired by the city, including Ramón Pérez de Ayala in Tigre Juan and Dolores Medio in her novel Nosotros los, Rivero.

Oviedo was featured prominently in Woody Allen's movie Vicky Cristina Barcelona.

Museums in Oviedo:

- Archaeological Museum of Asturias
- Museum of Fine Arts of Asturias
- Camara Santa within the Cathedral houses the Arca Santa and Sudarium of Oviedo
- Diocesan Museum
- Tabularium Artis Asturiensis
- Center for the reception and understanding of Preromanesque Art

Other cultural centres in Oviedo:

- Campoamor Theatre, opera house
- Filarmónica Theatre
- Palacio de Congresos de Oviedo
- Prince Felipe Auditorium

Cultural institutions: Orquesta Sinfonica del Principado de Asturias is the premier orchestra of the region, the Principality of Asturias. This full-time symphony orchestra performs a wide range of the classical repertoire with world class soloists and conductors. It is based in the Auditorio Principe Felipe in Oviedo, but it also performs regularly at the main concert venues in Gijón and Avilés. It is Internationally recognized as one of the best orchestras in Spain, it is also committed to adventurous programing with strong emphasis on education and community partnerships. Rossen Milanov is the music director.

Oviedo also hosts the annual Princess of Asturias Awards (previously called the Prince of Asturias Awards). This prestigious event, held in the city's Campoamor Theatre, recognizes international achievement in eight different categories. Previous award winners include Oscar Niemeyer, Bob Dylan and Francis Ford Coppola in the category of Arts; Nelson Mandela, the International Space Station and Al Gore in the category of International Cooperation; and Mario Bunge, CNN and Quino in the category of Communications and Humanities.

Oviedo University's international campus attracts many foreign scholars from all over the globe.

The city lends its name to the sudarium of Oviedo a religious relic revered there since the 9th century.

=== Traditions ===
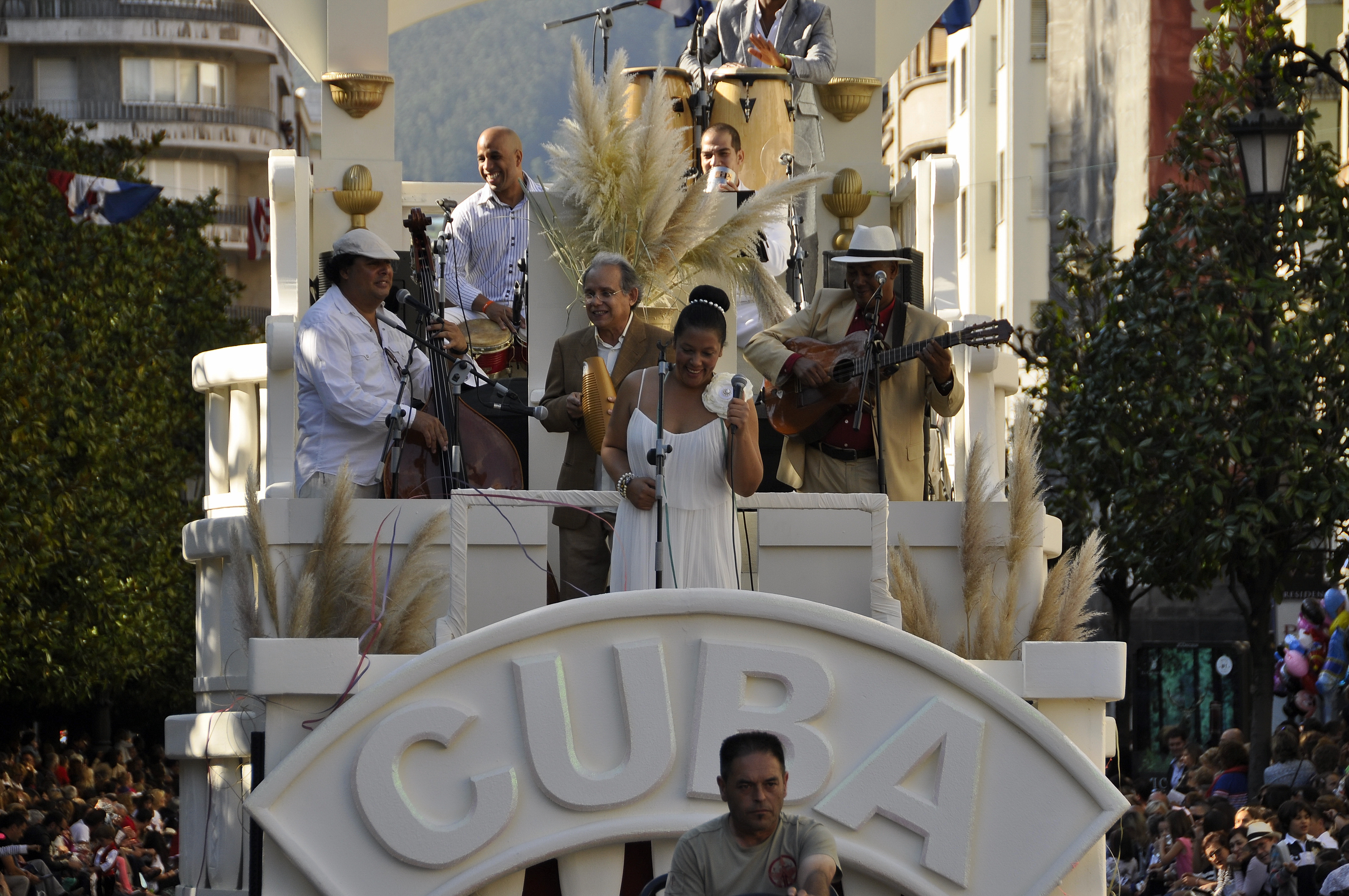
The Cuban float during the American Day in Asturias parade

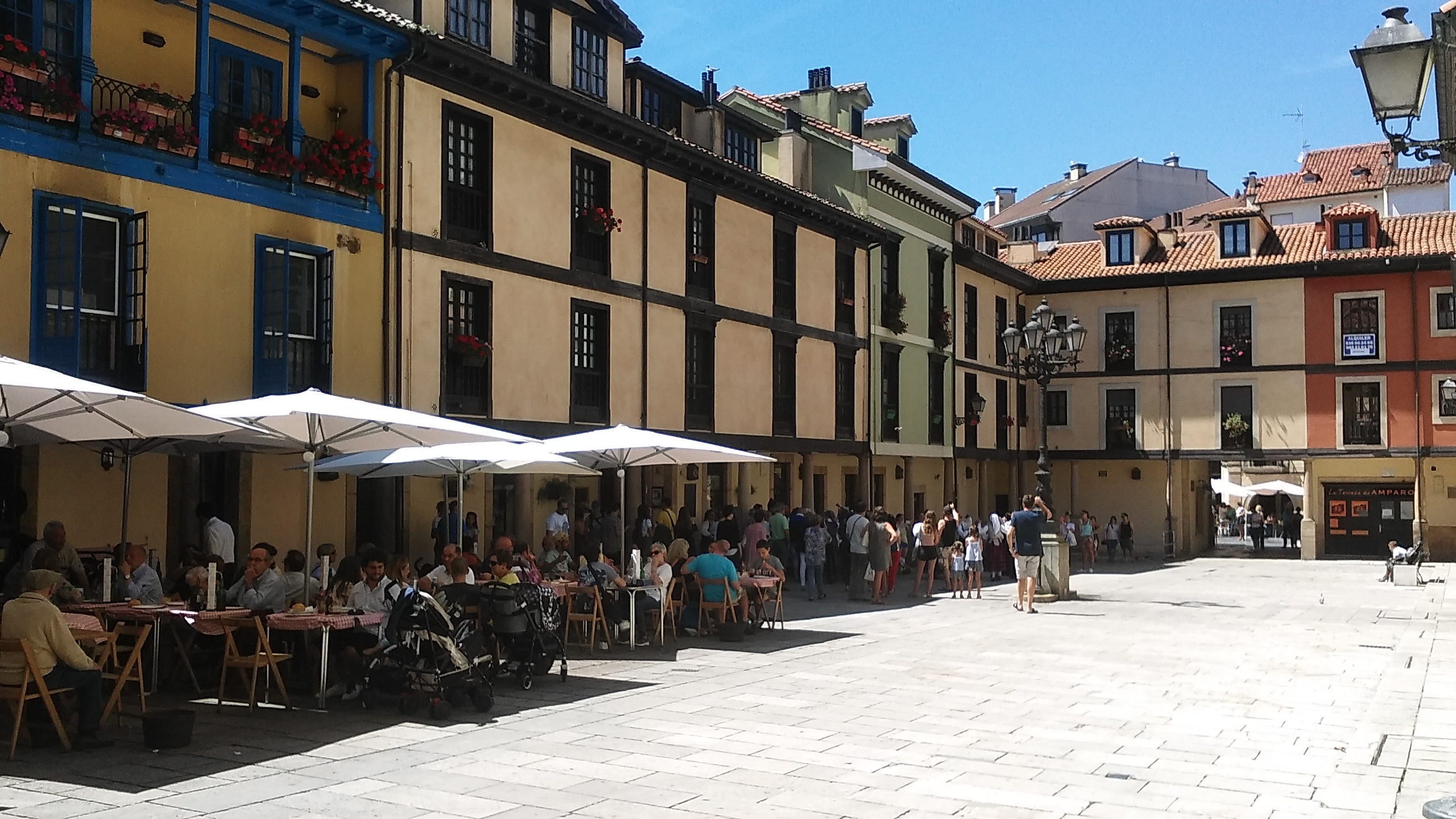
El Fontán square

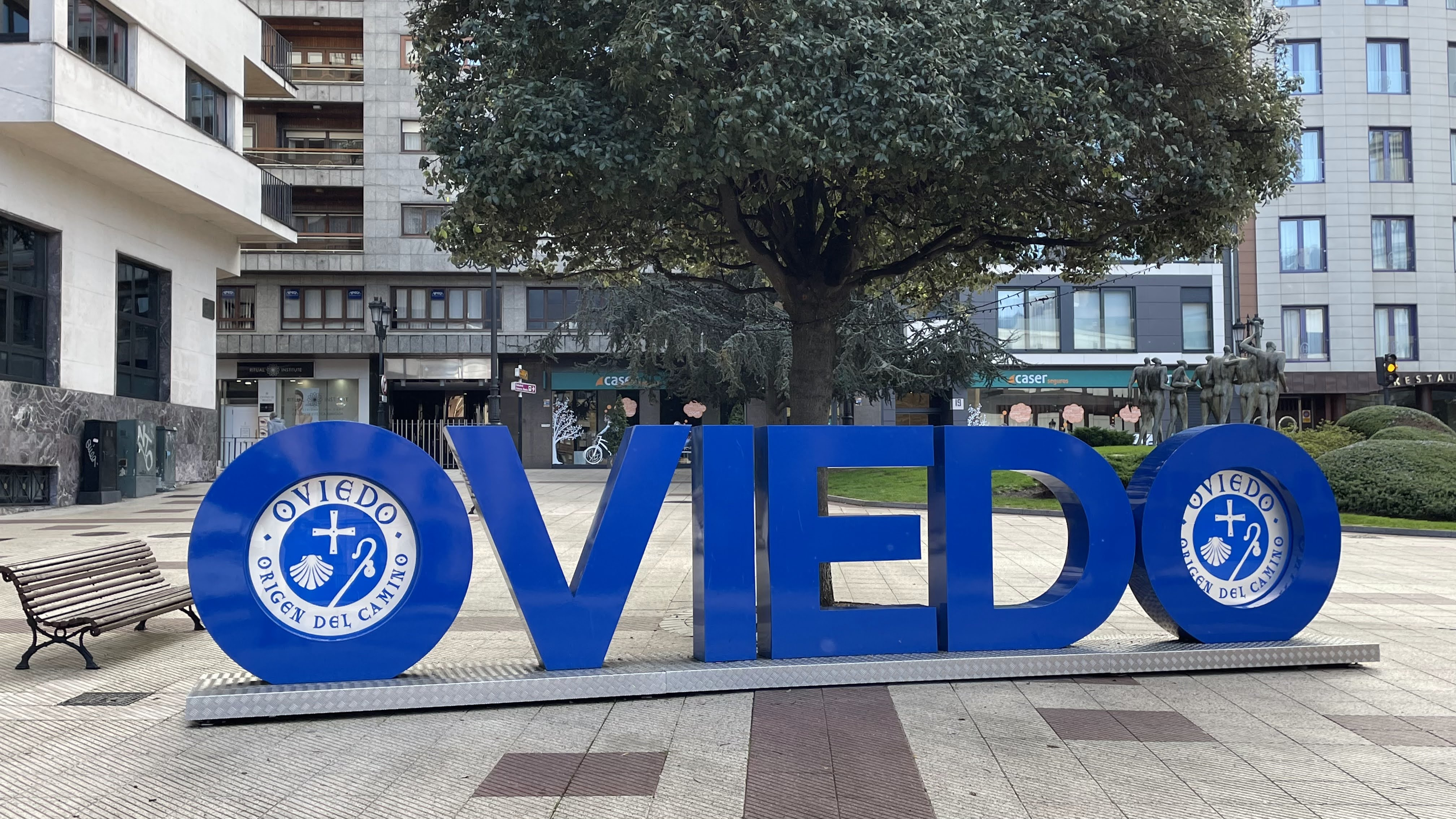
3D letters

==== The Festive Calendar ====
- Cabalgata de los Reyes Magos de Oriente: The traditional Twelfth Night parade, where the Three Wise Men of the East and their retinue parade through the city main streets, reaching the Cathedral Square, where they make their offering to the Child Jesus.
- L'Antroxu (Carnival)
- The Sudarium of Oviedo is displayed to the public three times a year: Good Friday, the Feast of the Triumph of the Cross on 14 September, and its octave on 21 September.
- The Feast of the Ascension
- La Foguera de San Xuan (Saint John's Bonfire):
- La Balesquida or Martes del Bollu or Martes del campo: A public holiday, on a Tuesday in mid-May, where people picnic in parks
- The Feast of San Mateo, a popular week-long festival with street food, music, concerts in the cathedral square and the Día de América en Asturias
- El Desarme (Disarmament's Day), commemorating the cunning victory of the locals over a Carlist army during the First Carlist War, during the 1830s

==== Typical gastronomy of the province ====
- Fabada, bean stew with selected cuts of pork, etc.
- Callos, tripe
- Carne gobernada, (chunks of meat, prepared with onion, garlic and white wine sauce)
- Chorizo a la sidra, (chorizo sausage prepared in cider)
- Paxarines, figures made from breadcrumb and egg coloured with saffron
- Carbayones, Oviedo's typical almond pastry
- Sidra, (cider), Asturian typical drink, fermented apple cider
- Arroz con leche, similar to rice pudding
- Frixuelos, similar to a crêpe
- Cachopo, veal with cheese and ham, breaded and fried

== Economy ==
The economy is strongly dependent on the service sector, with many office buildings in the city centre. Oviedo's status as the administrative centre of the region supports a large number of jobs in public administration. The manufacturing sector, which remains important in this part of Spain, is not prevalent in Oviedo itself, but is more important in the adjacent municipalities of Siero and Llanera which lie to the north of the city, between Oviedo and Gijón. In 2009, the municipality had a total debt of €135 million.

== Transport ==
=== Airports ===
Oviedo is served by the Asturias Airport, about 48 km (30 mi) from the center of the city; it is located in the municipality of Castrillón. The airport is connected to the city by the A-8 motorway, the A-66 motorway and scheduled bus service (Alsa).

=== Public transport ===
Oviedo currently has 15 bus lines and one Búho (owl) line. The owl services run on Saturdays, Sundays and on the eve of public holidays, except Christmas Day and Christmas Eve. Last two lines (Línea U y Línea V) that connect rural zones of Oviedo were implemented in March 2020 and they only operate between Monday and Friday.

=== Rail ===
The Oviedo railway station provides a wide range of long- and middle-distance services, in addition to regional and suburban (cercanías) services operated by Renfe. Within the municipality, there are others rail stations on the Cercanías Asturias network, in La Corredoria, Llamaquique, El Caleyo, Olloniego, Santa Eulalia de Manzaneda, Tudela-Veguín, Parque Principado, Colloto, Argañosa-Lavapiés, Las Campas, Las Mazas, Vallobín, San Claudio, Soto-Udrión, Trubia, Fuso de la Reina, and Caces.

=== Mining railway ===
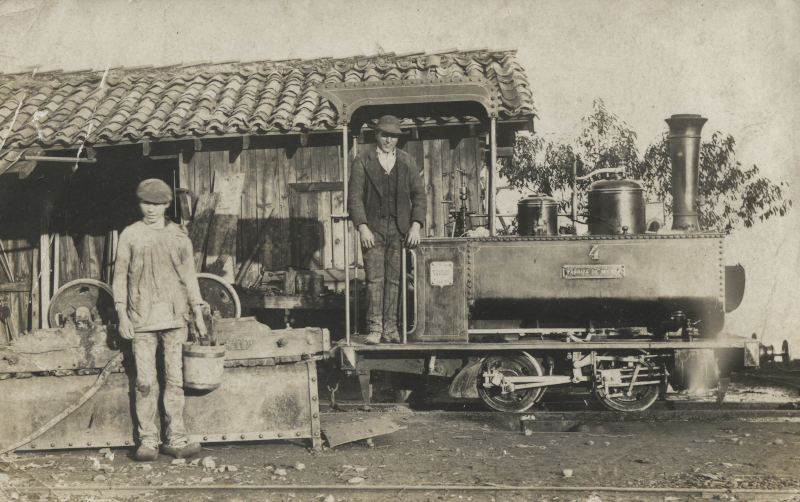
Couillet steam locomotive N° 4 of the Oviedo-Villapérez mining railway

The Oviedo-Villapérez mining railway was narrow gauge railway. It was just over 7 km (4.3 mi) long and ran from Oviedo to the iron ore mines in the Villapérez and Naranco mining areas from 1880 to 1916.

=== Tramway ===
From 1922 to 1956, there was a tramway system in Oviedo.

== Sport ==
=== Formula One ===
The most famous athlete from Oviedo is 2005 and 2006 Formula One world champion Fernando Alonso, famous for being Spain's only Formula One title winner, having raced for Minardi, Renault, Ferrari, McLaren, Alpine, and Aston Martin. Alonso has his official career and life museum, together with a karting circuit designed by himself, in Llanera, nearby Oviedo.

=== Sports teams in Oviedo ===
- Real Oviedo, football team. (Segunda División, second division)
- Real Oviedo Rugby, rugby union team. (División de Honor B, second division)
- Oviedo CB, basketball team. (LEB Oro, second division)
- Balonmano Base Oviedo, handball team. (División de Honor Plata, second division)
- Oviedo Booling, roller hockey team. (OK Plata, second division)
- Real Oviedo Femenino, football team. (Segunda Federación)

=== Annual sports events ===
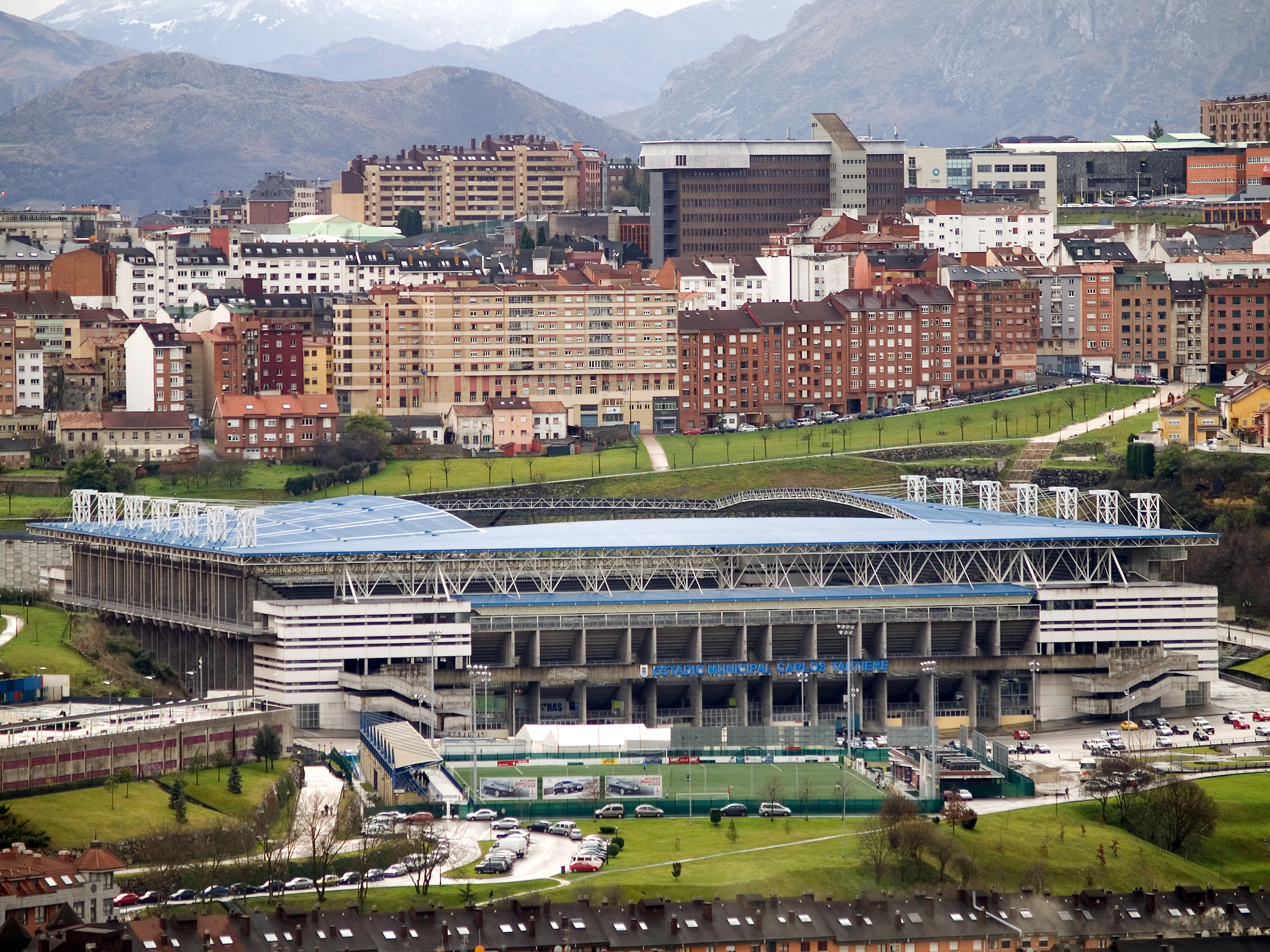
Estadio Carlos Tartiere

- International Showjumping Competition
- City of Oviedo Horse Show
- City of Oviedo San Silvestre* Outdoor Sports Climbing
- Vuelta a España (Cycling)
- Vuelta a Asturias (Cycling)
- Ascent of Naranco (Cycling)
- City of Oviedo Mountain Bike Open
- City of Oviedo Cycle Criterium
- Base Hockey International Tournament
- Prince of Asturias International Rally
- National Auto-Cross Championship
- International Hurdles Competition
- International Chess Open
- Boxing Nights
- Ascension Bowls Tournament
- San Mateo Bowls Tournament
- Open de España (Disc Golf)

== Notable people ==
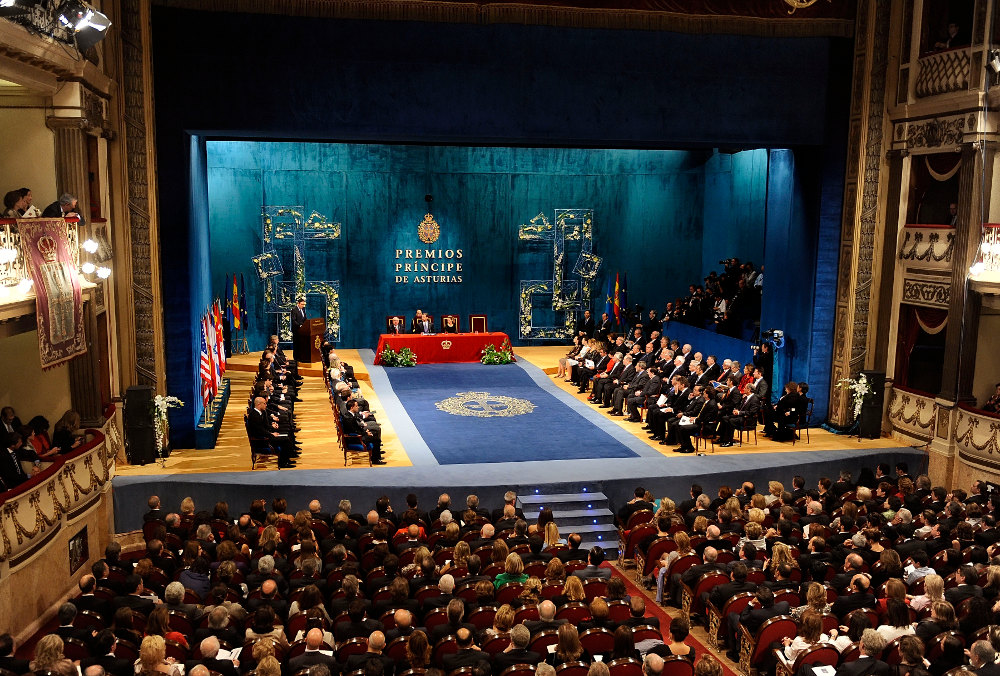
Princess of Asturias Awards at Campoamor Theatre

- HM Queen Letizia of Spain the consort of the Spanish king Felipe VI.
- Leopoldo Alas Clarín, 19th century novelist and literary critic.
- Fernando Alonso, racing driver, winner of the Formula One World Drivers' Championship in 2005 and 2006 and the 24 Hours of Le Mans in 2018 and 2019.
- Galo Blanco, professional tennis player and coach
- Enrique Castro Quini, retired footballer. He was widely regarded as one of the country's best strikers.
- Sabino Fernández-Campo, chief of the Spanish Royal House between 1990 and 1993. Count of Latores and Grandee of Spain
- Carmen Domínguez (born 1969), glaciologist
- Antonio Gamoneda winner of the 2006 Cervantes Prize.
- Ángel González, poet.
- Sid Lowe, well known international football journalist predominantly known for his contributions to The Guardian, studied in the University of Oviedo.
- Juan Mata, Manchester United footballer. World and European champion along with 2012 UEFA Champions League winner with Chelsea
- Melendi, pop singer.
- María Méndez, footballer for the Spain national team
- Michu, former Swansea City footballer.
- Ramón Pérez de Ayala, writer.
- Carmen Polo, wife of Spain's dictator Francisco Franco.
- Indalecio Prieto, socialist politician. One of the leaders of the Spanish Socialist Workers' Party up to the end of the Civil War and the posterior exile.
- Ángela Salvadores, basketball player
- Samuel Sánchez, cyclist. 2008 Olympic Road Race Champion.
- Jorge Suárez Carbajal, Asturian piper
- Tioda, 9th-century architect who designed several of the city pre-romanesque buildings.
- Tino Casal, singer, songwriter and producer in the town of Tudela Veguín, in the municipality of Oviedo.
- El Sueño de Morfeo, musical group
- Pelayo Novo (1990–2023), footballer
- Noemí Pinilla-Alonso, planetary scientist, astrophysicist.
- Nacho Tuñón, racing driver

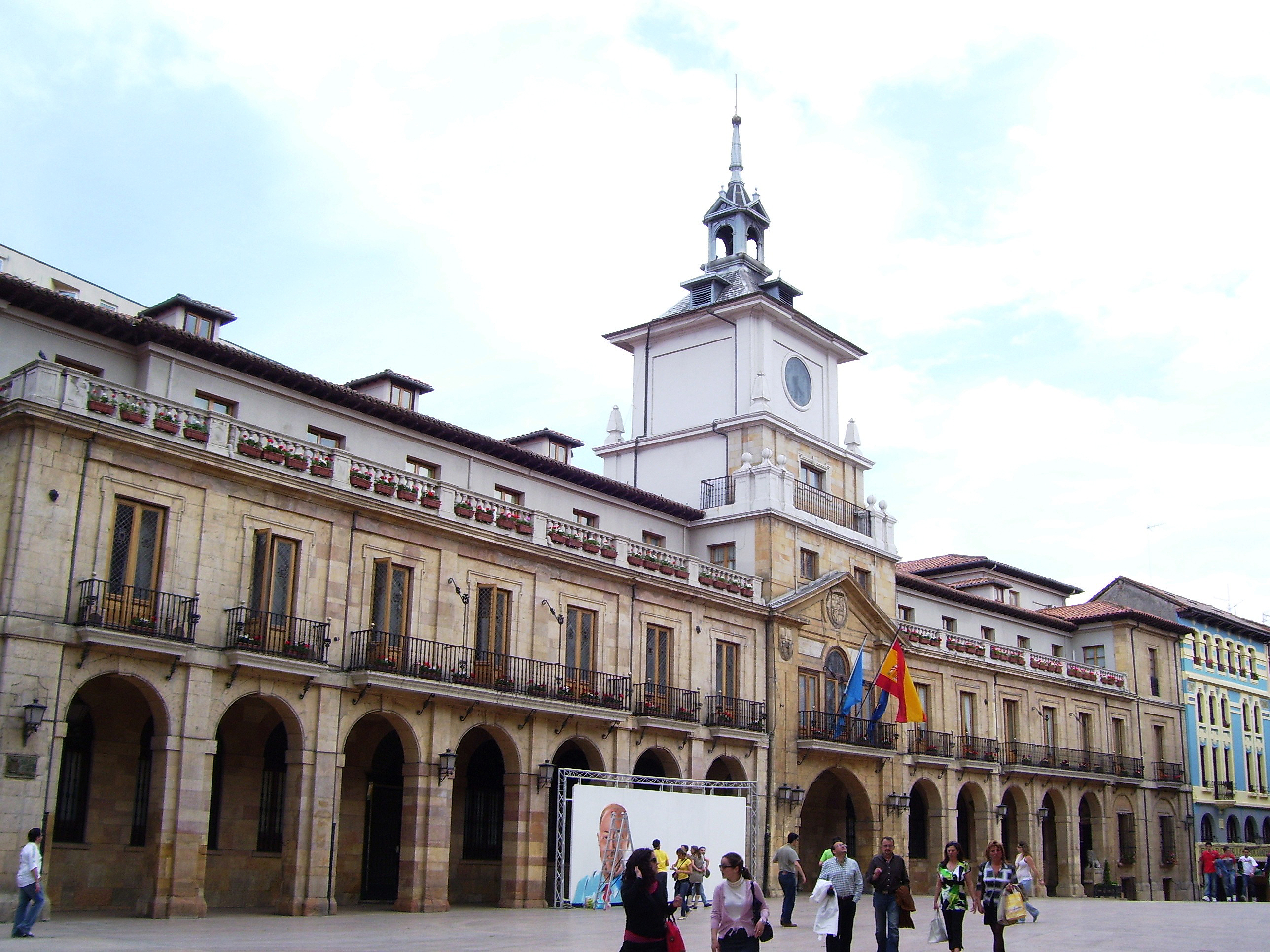
Oviedo's City Hall

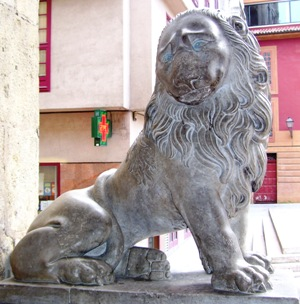
"Estatua del León" (probably 17th century) outside at City Hall.

== International relations ==
=== Twin towns – sister cities ===
Oviedo is twinned with:

- (United States) Oviedo, Florida (U.S.) since 1877
- Valparaíso, Chile, since 1976
- Bochum, Germany, since 1979
- Buenos Aires, Argentina, since 1983
- Veracruz, Mexico, since 1983
- Clermont-Ferrand, France, since 1988
- (United States) Tampa, Florida (U.S.) since 1991
- Santiago de Compostela, Spain, since 1993
- Santa Clara, Cuba, since 1995
- (United States) Jersey City, New Jersey (U.S.), since 1998
- Holon, Israel, since 1999
- Zamora, Spain, since 9 October 2001
- Torrevieja, Spain, since 2 January 2004
- Hangzhou, China, since 2006
- Valencia de Don Juan, Spain, since 2006
- Viseu, Portugal, since 10 April 2007
- Maranello, Italy, since 28 April 2010

== See also ==
- Iglesia de Santa María (Oviedo)
- List of municipalities in Asturias
