= Carmen Domínguez =

Spanish glaciologist and polar explorer

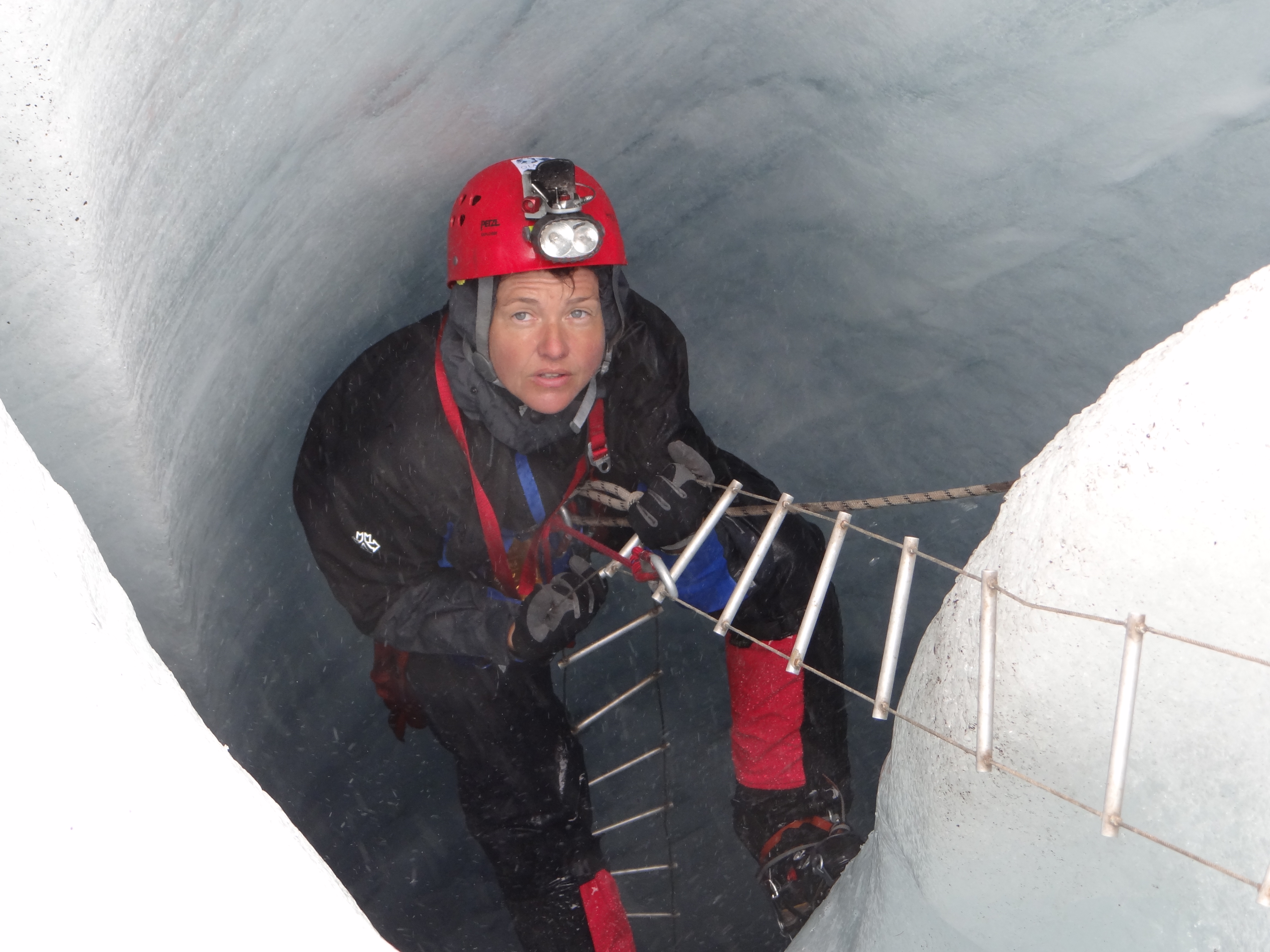
Domínguez investigating glacier discharge (2012)

Maria del Carmen Domínguez Álvarez, also Karmenka, (born 1969) is a Spanish glaciologist, polar explorer and mathematician. She is a co-founder of the Glackma Project which since 2001 has networked the measurement of glacier discharge in the polar regions. She has undertaken over 60 polar expeditions in Antarctica, Patagonia, Iceland, Svalbard and Siberia. Her work is considered to have contributed significantly to the understanding of global warming.

== Biography ==
Born in Oviedo, Domínguez studied mathematics at the University of Groningen and the University of Salamanca where she now teaches. Keen to use mathematics for practical applications, in 1997 she became interested in glaciers after hearing the geologist Adolfo Eraso's talk about Argentina's Perito Moreno Glacier. She joined him in investigating glaciers in the polar regions in 1997.

In 2001, together with Eraso, she founded the Glackma project which set out to study the discharge of glaciers as a component of global warming. For almost two decades, the hourly amount of glacier discharge (i.e. the amount of ice which has melted) has been measured in seven different polar regions of the Arctic and Antarctica. Domínguez has revealed that over the first 13 years the amount of water discharged doubled and over the next four years it doubled again.
