= Santa María de la Corte =

Coordinates: 43°21′47″N 5°50′33″W

Church of Santa María de la Corte
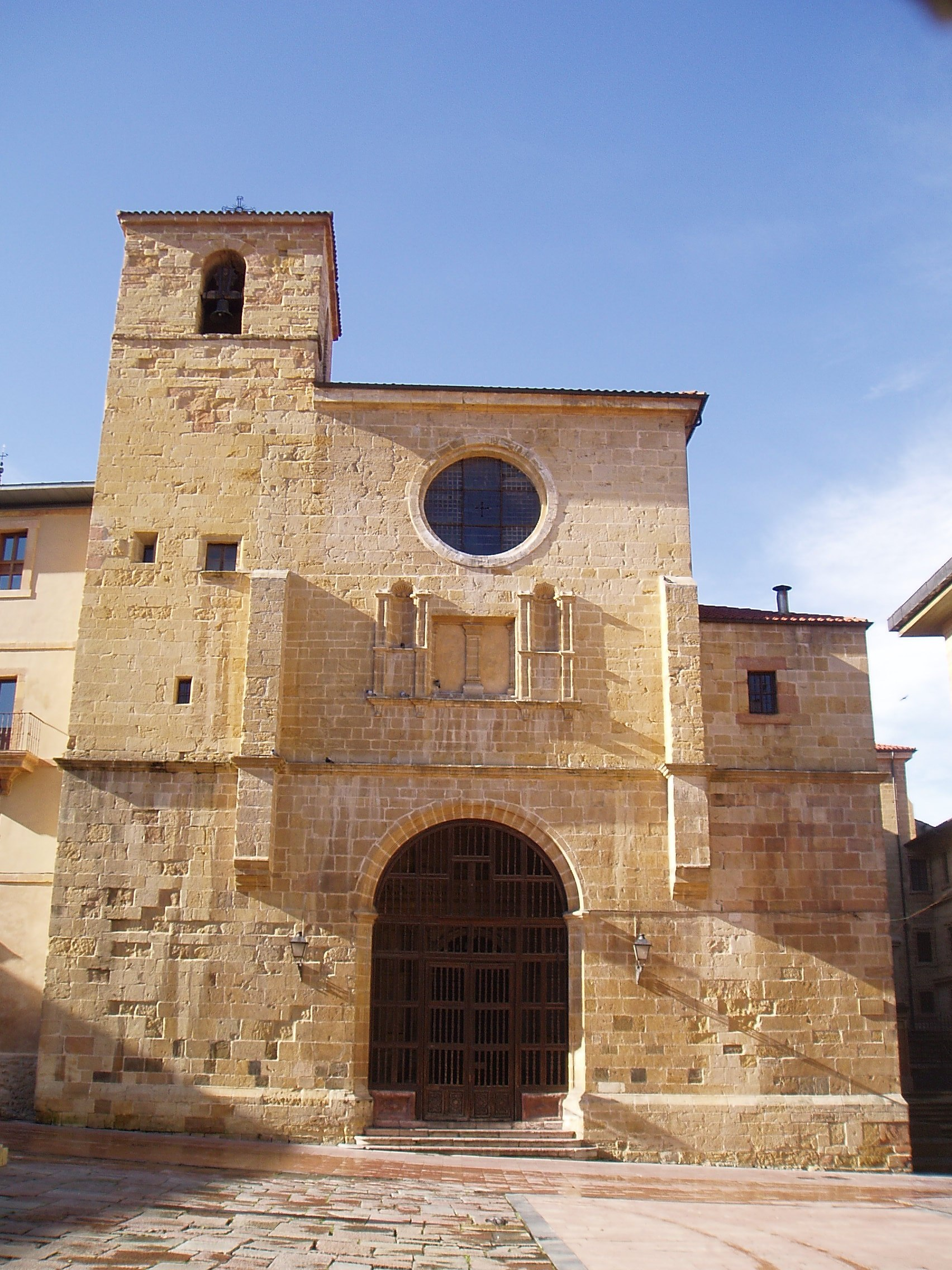
- Church of Santa María de la Corte
- Location: Asturias, Spain

The Iglesia de Santa María La Real de La Corte (Spanish: Iglesia de Santa María de la Corte) is a church in Oviedo, Asturias, Spain. It was established in the mid 16th century.

== See also ==
- Asturian art
- Catholic Church in Spain
