= Alfredo Canteli =

Spanish politician

Mayor of Oviedo
- Incumbent
- Assumed office 15 June 2019
- Preceded by: Wenceslao López Martínez

Personal details
- Born: 12 August 1946 (age 80) Prado, Spain
- Party: Independent

Alfredo Canteli Fernández (born 12 August 1946) is a Spanish politician. As an independent candidate leading the People's Party nomination, he was elected mayor of Oviedo in 2019.

== Early life ==
Canteli was born on 12 August 1946 in Prado, a village in the municipality of Teverga in Asturias. He was one of seven children to a teacher father and a mother who ran a shop and bar, who died aged 101 in 2016. His uncle Aladino Canteli was the last mayor of Proaza during the Second Spanish Republic, and was executed in 1937 during the Spanish Civil War. His sister's godfather was Herrerita, the all-time top scorer of Real Oviedo At age 11, he moved to Valladolid for his education. He and his wife Marta Suárez have two sons.

Canteli joined the Centro Asturiano, a cultural association, in 1971. After having a decade away from the organisation due to his work, he was voted its president in 1999, with 70% of the votes. He led the organisation to a membership of 18,000 people, around the same as Real Oviedo.

== Political career ==
In the 2011 Spanish local elections, Canteli turned down an approach from Asturias Forum to lead their nomination. Eight years later, he won the nomination from the People's Party (PP) ahead of Luis Antuña, head of the emergency unit at the Central University Hospital of Oviedo. Unusually for the PP candidate in Oviedo, Canteli was not the local leader of the party, and was not a registered member at all. In an act at an Evangelical church, he added the leader of the local Roma community, Rocío Gabarri, to his electoral list. His nomination was the most voted with nine out of 27 seats on the council, and with the support of the five members of Citizens (Cs) he was invested as mayor with an absolute majority; he gave Cs control of the areas of city planning and education while the PP controlled the seven other areas.

After the 2023 Spanish local elections, Cs were wiped out in Oviedo and Canteli governed with a 14-seat majority government. He pledged to complete projects began under his last term, such as a boulevard entrance to the city and renovation of the bullring, as well as initiating an aerial tramway to Monte Naranco.

Aged 80, Canteli was confirmed by PP president Alberto Núñez Feijóo as the mayoral candidate for 2027.
