= Fuentes de Carbajal =

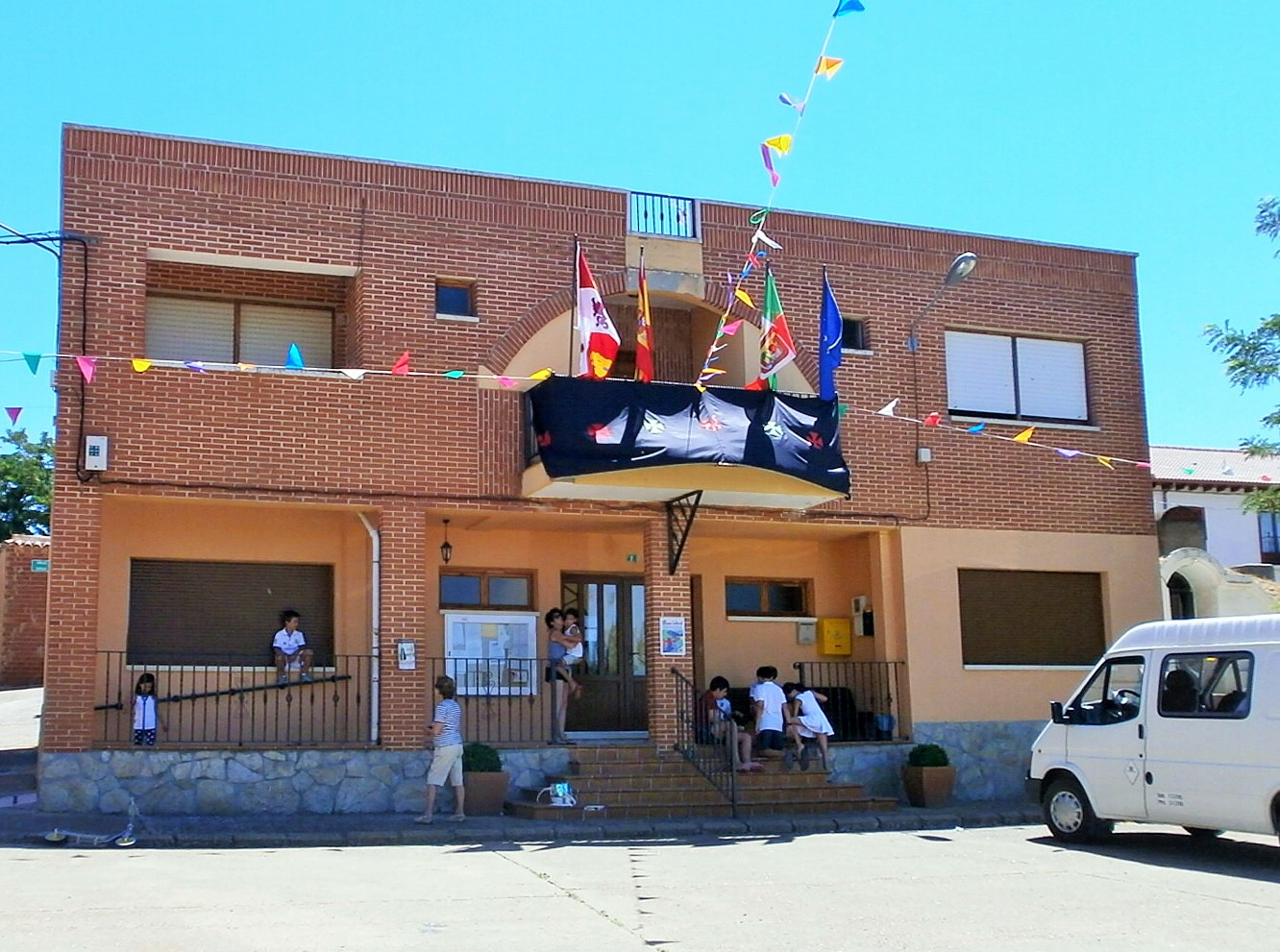
- Town hall

- Flag Coat of arms

- Location within Spain
- Coordinates: 42°10′38″N 5°26′47″W
- Country: Spain
- Autonomous community: Castile and León
- Province: León
- Municipality: Fuentes de Carbajal

Government
  - Mayor: Victorino Felicísimo Blanco del Valle (UPL)

Area
  - Total: 32.13 km^{2} (12.41 sq mi)
- Elevation: 803 m (2,635 ft)

Population (2025-01-01)
  - Total: 71
  - Density: 2.2/km^{2} (5.7/sq mi)
- Time zone: UTC+1 (CET)
  - Summer (DST): UTC+2 (CEST)
- Postal Code: 24206
- Telephone prefix: 987
- Climate: Cfb

Fuentes de Carbajal (Spanish pronunciation: [ˈfwentes ðe kaɾβaˈxal]) is a municipality located in the province of León, Castile and León, Spain. According to the 2010 census (INE), the municipality had a population of 121 inhabitants.
