= Capilla de la Balesquida =

Coordinates: 43°21′44″N 5°50′41″W

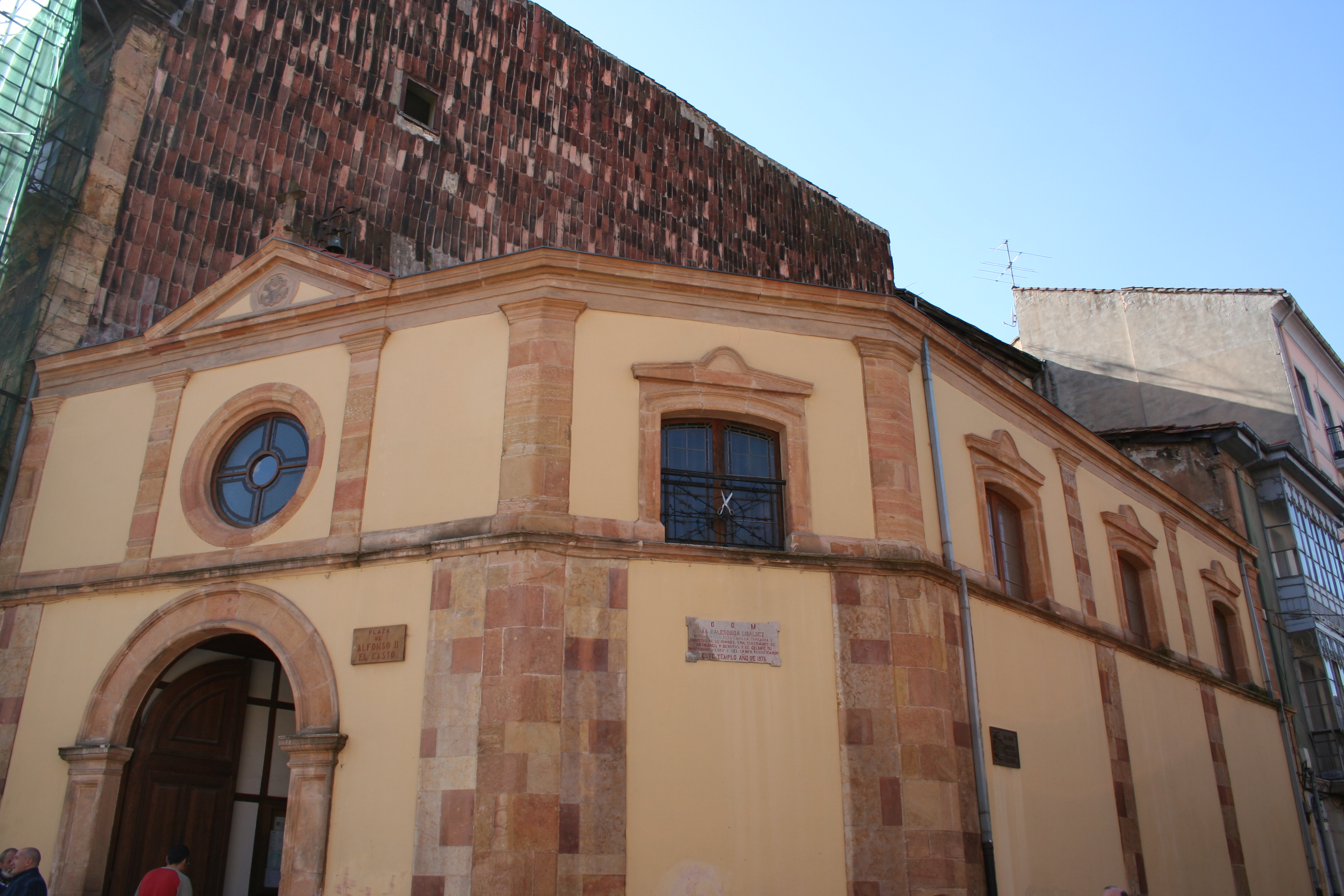
- Capilla de la Balesquida
- Location: Asturias, Spain

Capilla de la Balesquida ([kapiʎa diː lɑː baleskid̪a]) is a church in Asturias, Spain. The church was established in 1232.

== Gallery ==
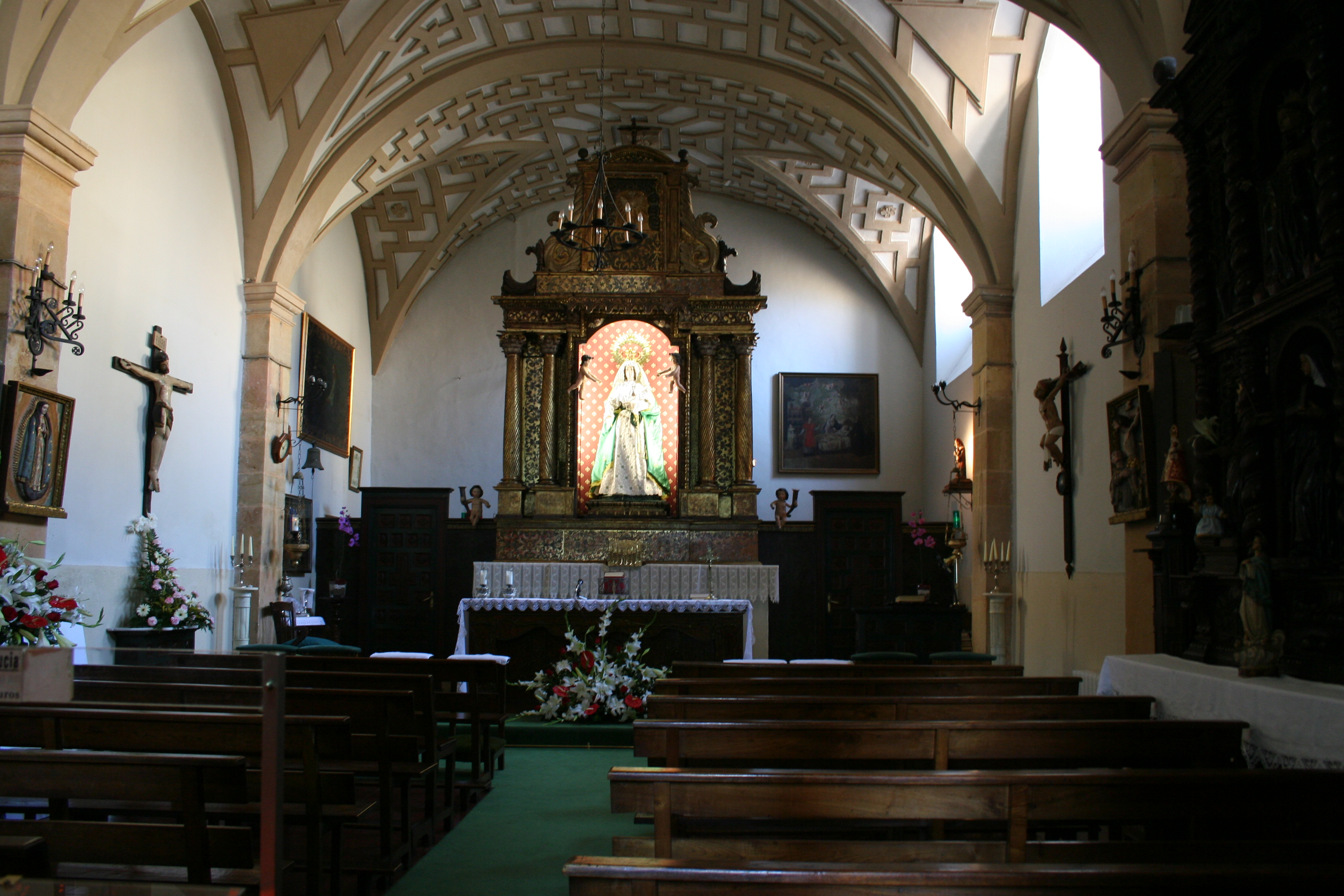

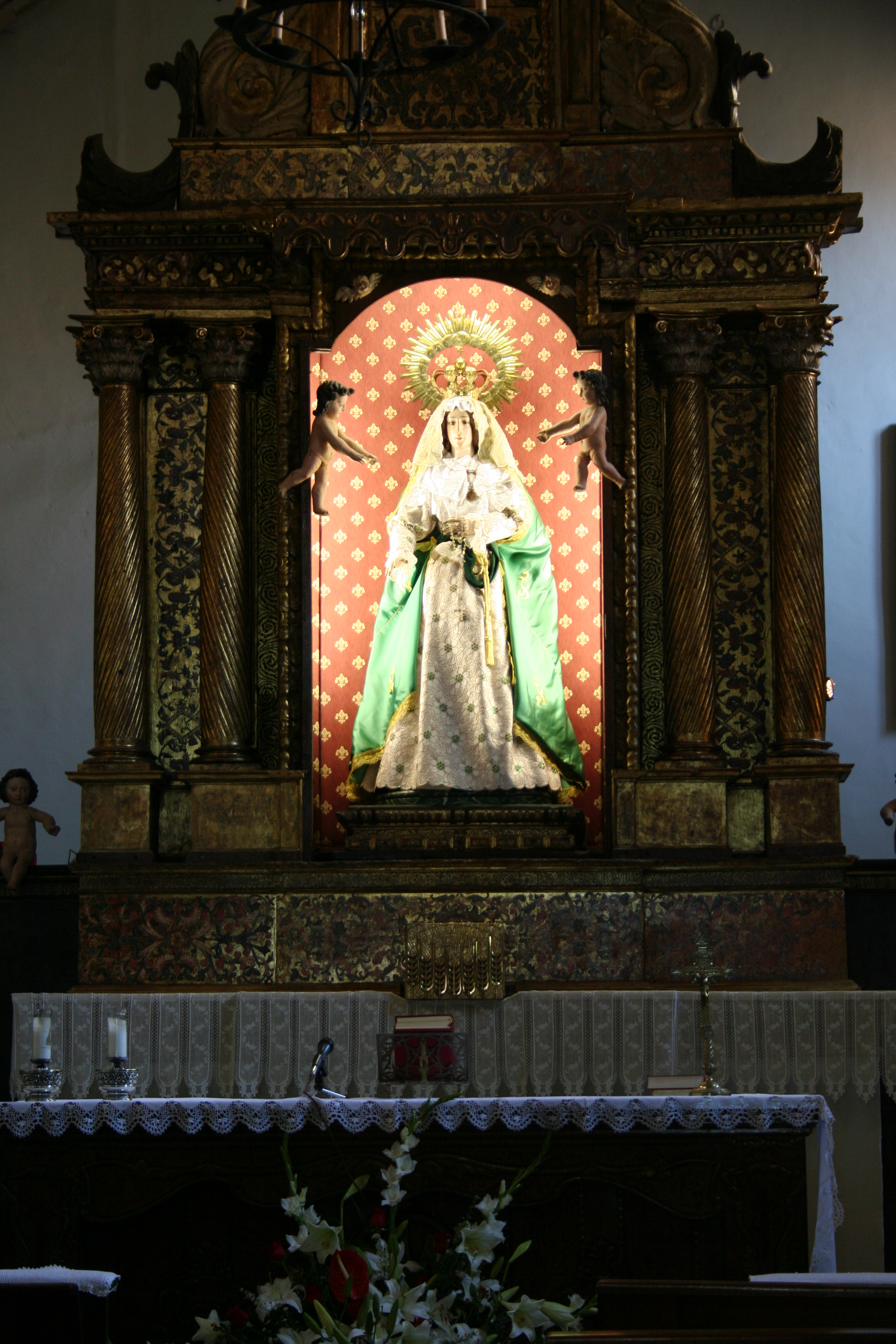

== See also ==
- Asturian art
- Catholic Church in Spain
- Churches in Asturias
- List of oldest church buildings
