= Jorge Suárez Carbajal =

Asturian piper (born 1986)

- Born: March 13, 1986 (age 39); Oviedo, Spain
- Genres: Folk music, Celtic music
- Occupation: Musician
- Instrument: Asturian bagpipe
- Years active: 1994–present
- Website: www.myspace.com/jorgesuarezcarbajal

Jorge Suárez Carbajal (born March 13, 1986, in Oviedo), is an Asturian piper, Asturias' Champion in 2004 and representing the Principality in the MacCrimmon Trophy (formerly Macallan Trophy) (Festival Interceltique de Lorient) for four consecutive years.

In 2011, he received the Award for Best Piper AMAS, awarded by the Anuario de la Música en Asturias (Yearbook of Music in Asturias), for his career. Also in 2012, the Centro Asturiano de Madrid (Asturian Cultural Association of Madrid) gave him a prize called "Urogallo de Bronce" (Bronze Capercaillie) at the bagpipes category, for his career as piper.

== Career ==
He started playing the bagpipes in 1994, in Suares schools (Asturias), with Eugenio Otero. In 1997 he became part of the Banda Gaites Noreña. With this band he plays in much of Asturias and Spain. He also plays in Portugal.

In 2000, he won first prize in the regional final of competition for children "Veo-Veo" presented by Teresa Rabal, along with a group of rhythmic gymnastics of Gijon.

In March 2000, he received lessons from Xuacu Amieva, until 2003.

Also he is Surveyor Engineer by the Oviedo University.

With his brother Carlos, he plays for several regional dance groups from Asturias, as for example the Asociación Foklórica "Onís".

In 2003, he ranked third in the Macallan Trophy de Gaita at the Festival Interceltique de Lorient. On June 18, 2004, he wins the Final of the Memorial Remis Ovalle in Oviedo.

In 2006, he ranked second in the MacCrimmon Trophy at the Festival Interceltique de Lorient, being only surpassed by the asturian piper Ruben Alba and getting the first position in Breton Set (mandatory set since 2003).

== Other awards ==
Year	Award	Category	Result
2000	Veo-Veo Oviedo	-	Winner ex aequo
2011	Premios AMAS 2011	Best Piper	Winner
2012	Urogallo de Bronce	Asturian Bagpipes	Winner
