= Church of San Pedro de Nora =

Church in Las Regueras, Asturias, Spain

Church of Saint Peter of Nora Iglesia de San Pedro de Nora (in Spanish)
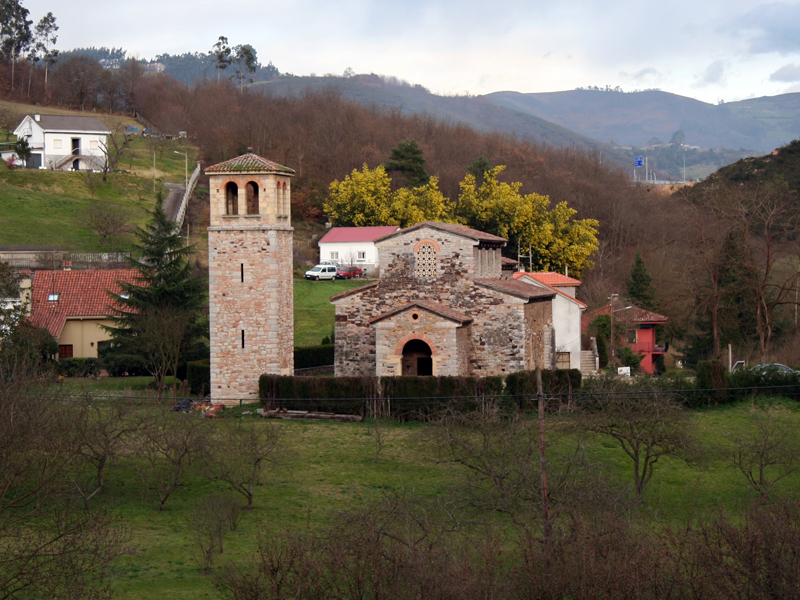

Religion
- Affiliation: Roman Catholic
- Province: Asturias
- Ecclesiastical or organisational status: Church

Location
- Location: Las Regueras, Asturias, Spain
- Interactive map of Church of Saint Peter of Nora; Iglesia de San Pedro de Nora (in Spanish)
- Coordinates: 43°22′9″N 5°57′42.9″W

Architecture
- Type: Church
- Style: Pre-Romanesque
- Completed: 9th century

Specifications
- Length: 18 metres (59 ft)
- Width: 13 metres (43 ft)

Saint Peter of Nora (Spanish: Iglesia de San Pedro de Nora) is a Roman Catholic Pre-Romanesque church, located in Las Regueras, Asturias, Spain, beside the Nora river, about 12 km from Oviedo. The church is recorded for the first time in a donation document of Alfonso III of Asturias in 905.

Given its similarities with the church of San Julián de los Prados and the church of Santa María de Bendones, it was probably built in the times of Alfonso II of Asturias. Declared a National Monument in 1931, the church was damaged by a fire in 1936 during the Spanish Civil War, losing its roof. It was restored by Luis Menéndez Pidal y Alvarez.

== Architecture ==
This church follows the construction style established in the church of San Julián de los Prados: facing eastwards, it has a vestibule separate from the main structure, a basilica-type ground plan, a central nave higher than the side aisles, with an intersecting wooden roof and lit by windows with stone lattice. The straight sanctuary is divided into three apses with barrel vaults. As a differentiating element, the apses were joined to each other through the dividing walls by semicircular-arched doors. Like all the churches from this period, there was a room over the apse, only accessible from outside through a trefoil window. The bell tower, separate from the church as in Santa María de Bendones, does not belong to the original construction, and stems from an initiative in the 1970s by the architect and great restorer of Asturian Pre-Romanesque, Luis Menéndez Pidal y Alvarez.

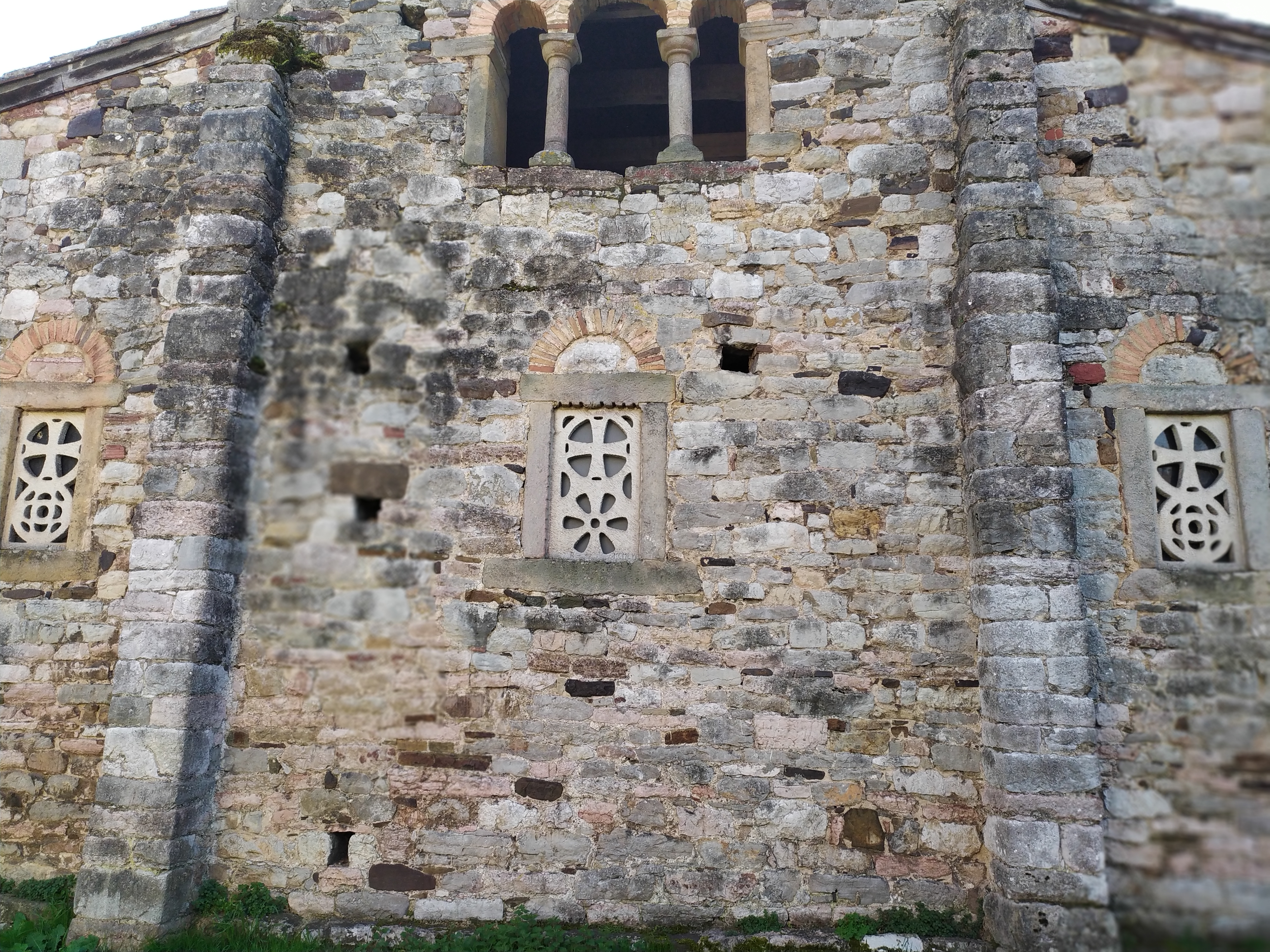
Rear of the edifice, showing traceried windows.

== See also ==
- Asturian architecture
- Catholic Church in Spain
