= Iglesia de San Miguel (Villardeveyo) =

Coordinates: 43°28′10″N 5°50′10″W

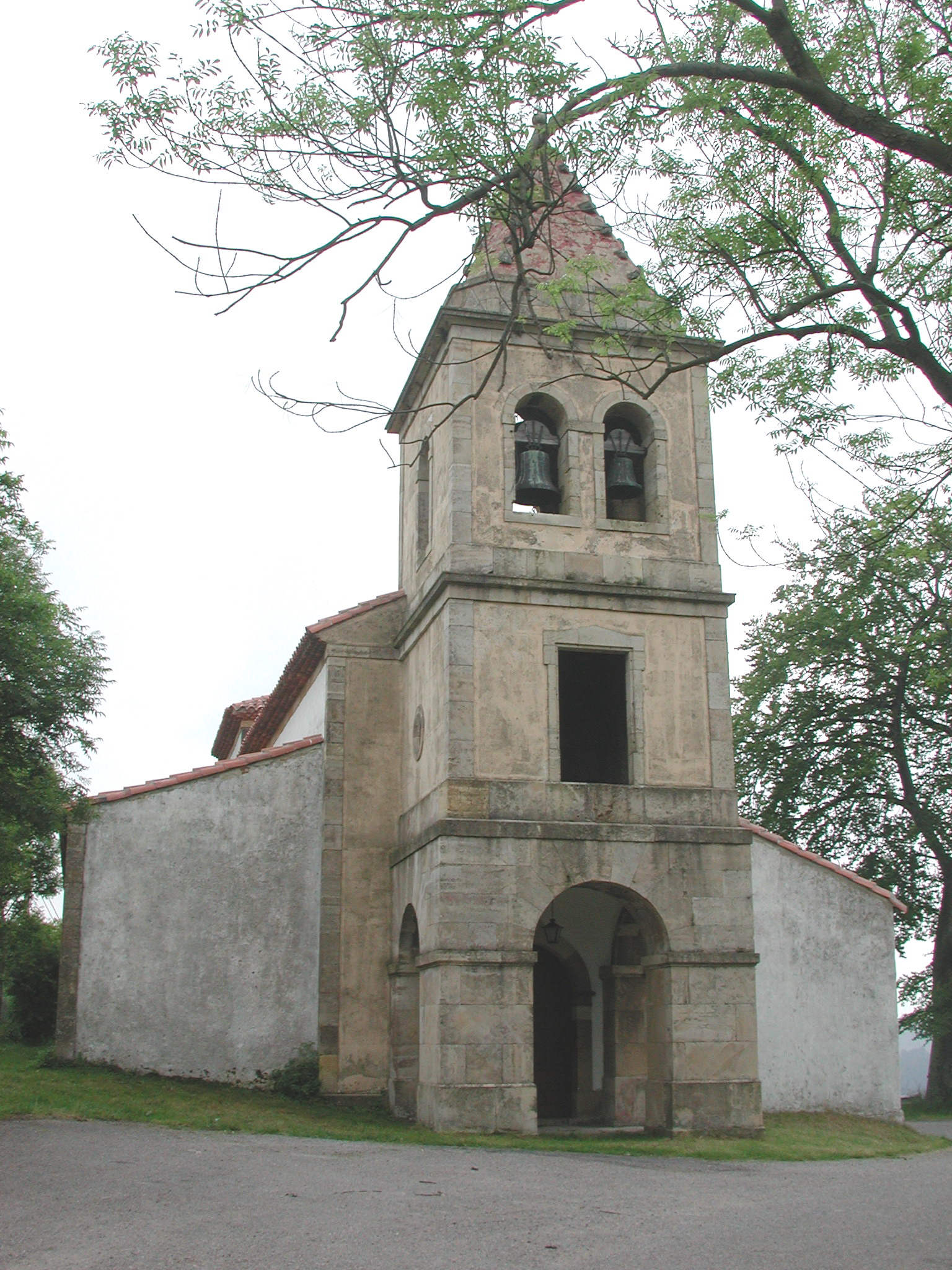
- Iglesia de San Miguel (Villardeveyo)
- Location: Asturias, Spain

Iglesia de San Miguel (Villardeveyo) is a church in Asturias, Spain. The church while founded in the 9th century, was rebuilt in its present form in 1884. It retains a window grill from the earlier church.

== See also ==
- Asturian art
- Catholic Church in Spain
- Churches in Asturias
- List of oldest church buildings
