= Asturian architecture =

Architectural style of the Kingdom of Asturias

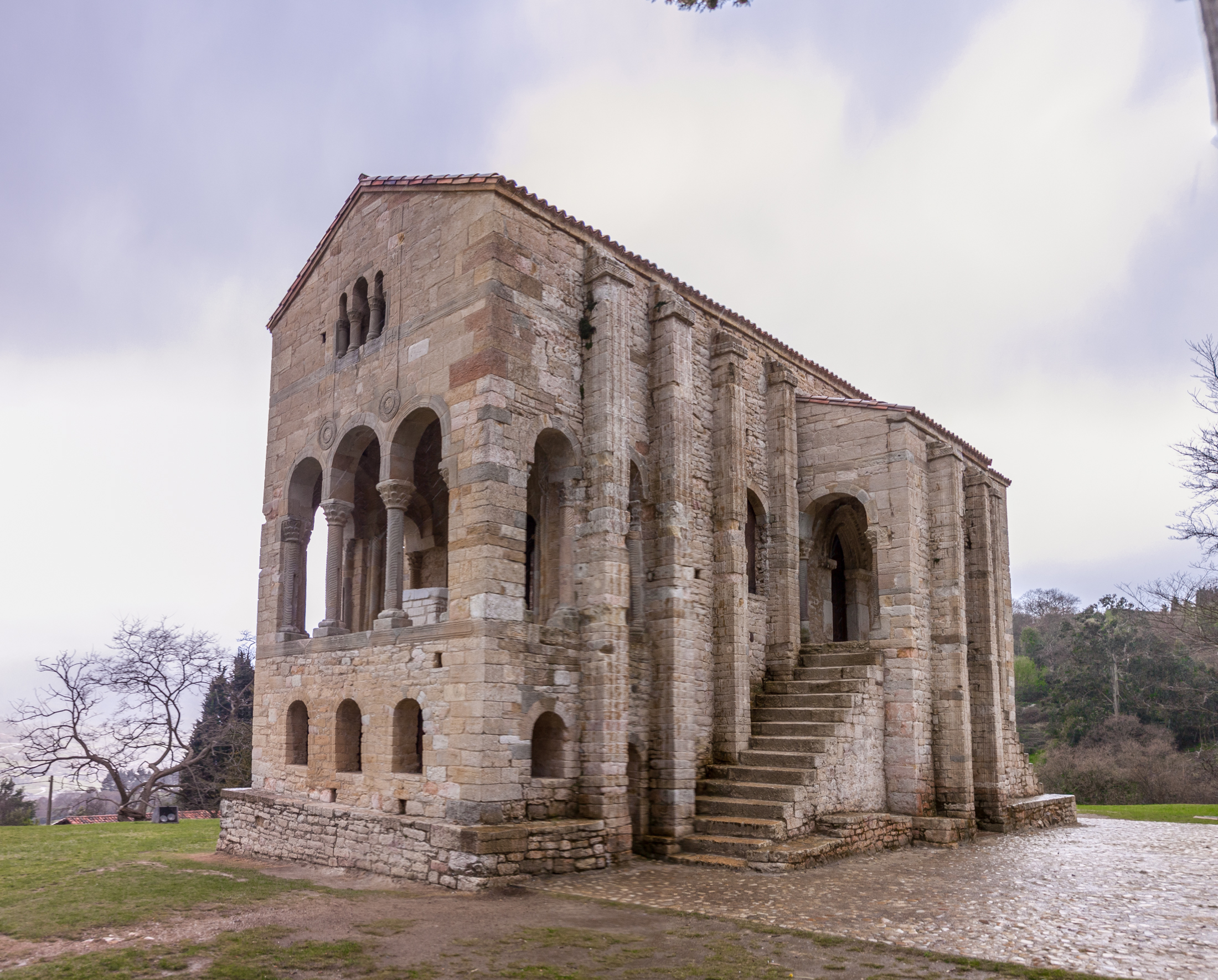
Santa María del Naranco

Pre-Romanesque architecture in Asturias is framed between the years 711 and 910, the period of the creation and expansion of the kingdom of Asturias.

== History ==
In the 5th century, the Goths, a Christianized tribe of Eastern Germanic origin, arrived in the Iberian Peninsula after the fall of the Roman Empire, and dominated most of the territory, attempting to continue Roman order by the so-called Ordo Gothorum.

In the year 710, the Visigothic king Wittiza died, and instead of being succeeded by the eldest of his three sons, Agila, the throne was usurped by the duke of Baetica, Roderic. The young heir sought support to recover the throne, and apart from local backing, he approached the Muslim Kingdom in northern Africa. Tarik, the caliph of Damascus governor in Tangier, received permission to offer his army and disembark in Spain, ready to face the Visigothic army of King Roderic.

On July 19, 711, the battle of Guadalete took place near Gibraltar, where supporters of Witiza's heir, backed by Tarik's Muslim army, killed King Roderic and destroyed the Visigothic army. Tarik and his troops then took advantage of their military superiority, and marched on the Visigothic capital, Toledo, taking it almost without opposition.

According to the chronicles, Asturian mercenaries, who had already been recruited by the Romans for their courage and fighting spirit, fought alongside King Roderic. These warriors, together with the rest of the retreating Gothic army, sought refuge in the mountains of Asturias, where they also tried to safeguard some of the sacred relics from Toledo cathedral, the most important of which was the Holy Ark, containing a large number of relics from Jerusalem.

The kingdom of Asturias arose exactly seven years later, in 718, when the Astur tribes, rallied in assembly, decided to appoint Pelayo as their leader, a person of uncertain origin, since for some chroniclers he was a Visigothic nobleman who fled from the Muslim conquerors and for others he was an indigenous nobleman associated with the Visigothic kingdom. Whatever the case, Pelayo joined the local tribes and the refuged Visigoths under his command, with the intention of progressively restoring Gothic Order, based on the kingdom of Toledo's political model.

The kingdom of Asturias disappeared with King Alfonso III, who died in December of the year 910. In barely two hundred years, the 12 kings of the dynasty founded by Pelayo were to gradually recover territory from the Muslims (León, Galicia and Castile), a process which finally required the court to be moved south, to León, for its strategic position in the struggle that culminated 800 years after it had started (1492) with the taking of Granada and the expulsion of the last Arabic king from the Iberian Peninsula. The symbol of the flag of Asturias, a golden cross (significantly called "La Victoria"), and a blue background with the Latin motto Hoc signo, tvetvr pivs, Hoc signo vincitvr inimicvs (With this sign the pious is protected, With this sign you shall defeat the enemy), sums up the unified character that Christianity gave the armed struggle.

== Pre-Romanesque as the Asturian monarchy's artistic expression ==
Asturian Pre-Romanesque is a singular feature in all Spain, which, while combining elements from other styles (Visigothic, Mozarabic and local traditions), created and developed its own personality and characteristics, reaching a considerable level of refinement, not only as regards construction, but also in terms of decoration and gold ornamentation. This last aspect can be seen in such relevant works as the Cross of the Angels, the Victory Cross, the agate Box (housed in the Holy Chamber of Oviedo Cathedral), the Reliquary in Astorga Cathedral and the Cross of Santiago. As court architecture, the situation of Pre-Romanesque monuments followed in the wake of the various locations of the kingdom's capital; from its original site in Cangas de Onís (Eastern Asturias), through Pravia (west of the central coast), to its final location in Oviedo, the region's geographical centre.

As regards its evolution, from its appearance, Asturian Pre-Romanesque followed a "stylistic sequence closely associated with the kingdom's political evolution, its stages clearly outlined". Five stages are distinguished; a first period (737–791) belonging to the reigns of the kings Fáfila, Alfonso I, Fruela I, Aurelio, Silo, Mauregato and Vermudo I. A second stage comprises the reign of Alfonso II (791–842), entering a stage of stylistic definition, and third comprises the reigns of Ramiro I (842–850) and Ordoño I (850–866); a fourth belongs to the reign of Alfonso III (866–910) and a fifth and last which coincides with the transfer of the court to León, the disappearance of the kingdom of Asturias, and simultaneously, of Asturian Pre-Romanesque.

== Monuments of interest ==
=== First period (737 to 791) ===
Two churches from this early period of the kingdom's rise and consolidation have been recognised. The Church of Santa Cruz (737) at the court's original location, Cangas de Onís, was destroyed in 1936. The present-day church dates from 1950 and, like the original, is built over a barrow covering a dolmen. The legend goes that the name Santa Cruz ("Holy Cross") comes from the oaken cross carried by King Pelayo in the battle of Covadonga, the first "little-big victory" against the Arabs, which was covered in gold and precious stones during the reign of Alfonso III, and came to be called La Victoria, the emblem of Asturia. Chronicles state that the Church of Santa Cruz was built in stone masonry, one nave with a barrel vault and a main chapel on one side.

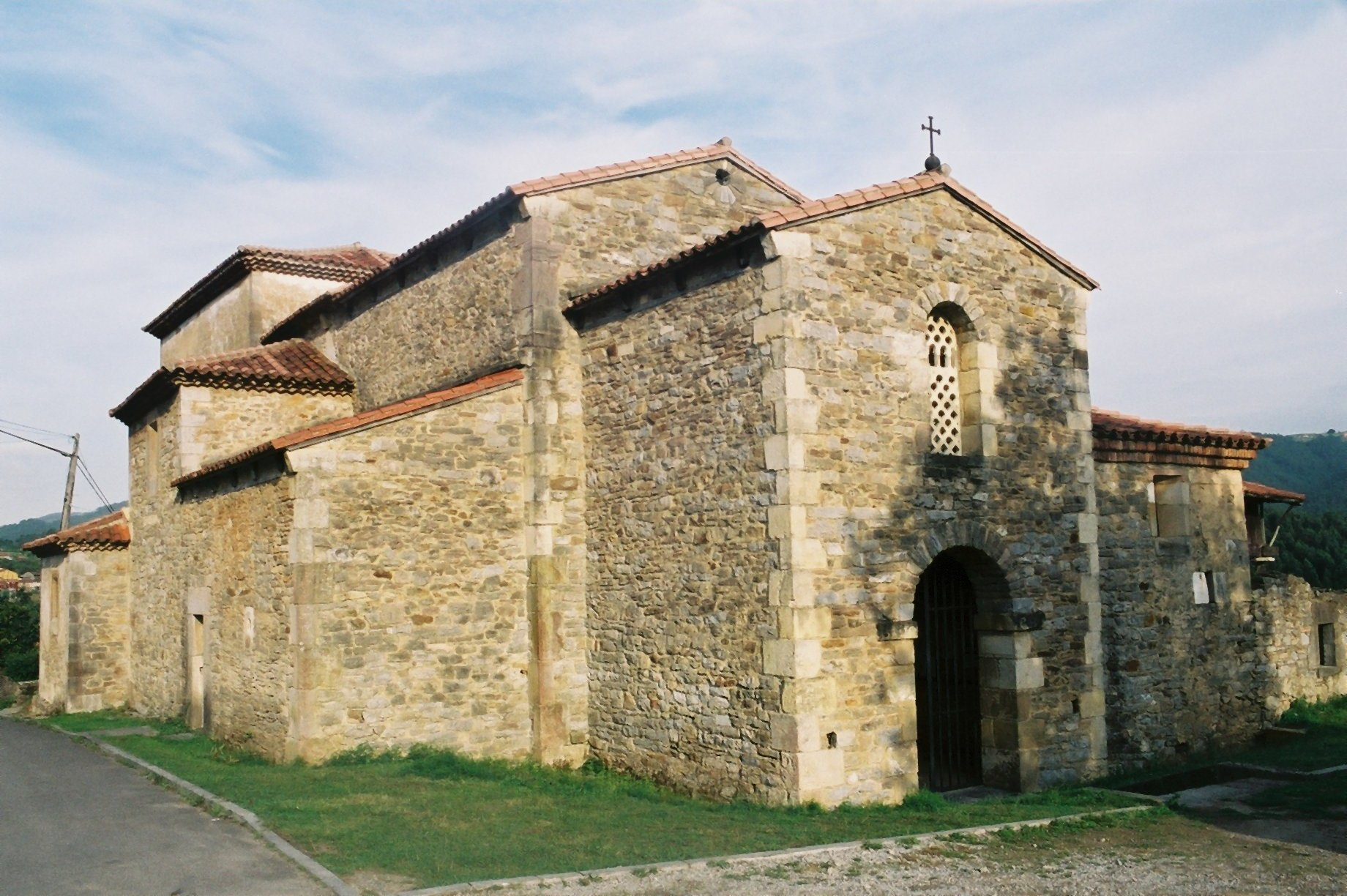
Santianes de Pravia

The second is the Church of San Juan Apóstol y Evangelista, Santianes de Pravia. Its construction results from the move of the royal court from Cangas de Onís to Pravia, an old Roman settlement (Flavium Navia) and crossroads. The church, built between 774 and 783, already showed a number of elements anticipating Asturian Pre-Romanesque: an eastward-facing, basilica ground plan (central nave and two side aisles), separated by three semicircular arches, the transept facing the central nave with the same length as the width of the three aisles. It also had a single, semicircular apse, and an external entrance vestibule, with a wooden ceiling over the nave.

Several sculptural decorative elements showing floral and geometric designs (characteristics of subsequent Pre-Romanesque) are on public display in the museum in the sacristy.

=== Second period (791 to 842) ===
Alfonso II, known as "the Chaste" (maybe for this reason he had no descendants), was a decisive king in the Asturian monarchy. From a military point of view, he definitively established the kingdom against the Muslims (in the famous battle of Lutos he gained a significant victory), in administration he moved the court to its final site in Oviedo, and in politics he set up cordial, stable relationships with the emperor Charlemagne, as demonstrated by the following quote by Eginardo (Vita caroli):

... the emperor (Charlemagne) was so closely united with Alfonso, king of Asturias and Galicia, that each time he sent a letter or ambassador, he ordered that he be given no treatment other than that of his client.

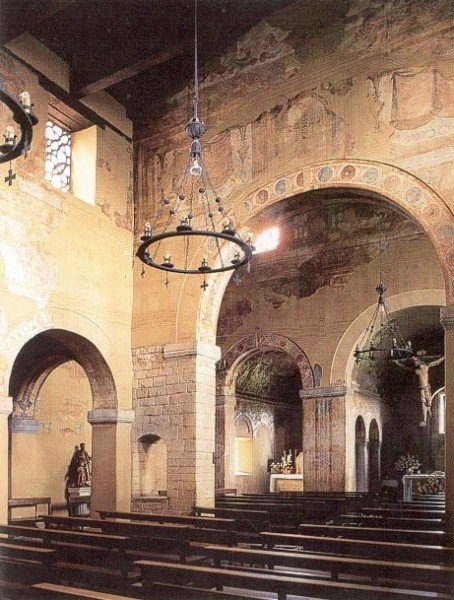
St Juliàn Prados, Oviedo

As regards patronage of art, Alfonso II promoted the largest number of Pre-Romanesque buildings defining what were to be this style's characteristics. With the royal architect, Tioda, he built the churches of Church of San Tirso, Oviedo, San Julián de los Prados, Santa María de Bendones and San Pedro de Nora, in addition to the palace complex in Oviedo, now disappeared, consisting of the churches of San Salvador, Santa María and its adjoining palace and chapel (now the Holy Chamber of Oviedo Cathedral, the only one remaining), containing relies such as the Holy Ark and jewels, like the Cross of the Angels, which he donated himself to the Church of San Salvador. Outside Asturias, with the legend of the discovery of the apostle St. James' tomb in Galicia, in a place known as campus stellae (Compostela), Alfonso II had the first church built in the saints honour (year 892).

When the Church of San Julián de los Prados, or Santuyano, was built (approx. between the years (812 and 842), it formed part of a series of royal buildings. The church had a basilica ground plan (central nave and two side aisles), separated by three semicircular arches on impost capitals and square columns. There is a transept or transversal aisle located between the aisles and the sanctuary, exceeding the central nave in height.

Finally, there was a straight sanctuary, divided into three chapels, and over the main one, only accessible from outside, there was a room whose function is still open to conjecture. As for the roof, the church had an interesting oaken ceiling carved with a variety of geometric designs.

As elements outside the ground plan, there was a vestibule (to the east) and two sacristies adjoining the north and south facades, communicating directly with the transept. The Church of San Julián de los Prados is the largest of the pre-romanesque churches.

From an ornamental point of view, the murals covering the walls and ceilings of this church are the best-conserved upper medieval paintings in Spain. the technique used is al fresco painting (applied with the plaster still wet), arranged in three well-defined areas. Decorative designs show clear influence of mural painting from the Roman period, recreating a certain atmosphere typical of the "theatrical style" (1st century B.C.). Decorative elements are numerous; marble imitation, rectangles, bands, weaving, squares, imitation channeling and columns, medallions decorated with plant motifs, architectural designs, curtains, though totally lacking in any portrayal of biblical or religious scenes, with the single exception of the Anastasis Cross (alpha and omega), as a symbol of royal power. This lack of figurative representation is known as aniconism and was not maintained in later Pre-Romanesque churches.

The church of San Tirso, located beside the Cathedral of Oviedo, conserves only the end wall of the apse from its original construction, because it was destroyed by fire in the 16th century. The section remaining shows the original construction in stone blocks, and in the centre, there is the characteristic three-point window of Asturian Pre-Romanesque, with semicircular arches made of brick. The central opening, larger than the side ones, is supported by free-standing columns.

The Holy Chamber was built as a palace chapel for Alfonso II and the church of San Salvador (both demolished in the 14th century to build the present Gothic cathedral). The Chamber, adjoining the pre-Romanesque Tower of San Miguel, also had the function of housing relics brought from Toledo after the fall of the Visigothic kingdom. It consists of two overlapping aisles with a barrel vault; the crypt or lower floor has a height of 2.30 metres, and is dedicated to St. Leocadia, containing several tombs of other martyrs.

The upper floor, dedicated to St. Michael, was extended in the 12th century, elongating the central section to six metres, a reconstruction that also provided it with its current decoration, a masterpiece of Spanish Romanesque. From an architectural point of view, the Holy Chamber's construction solved one of the greatest problems of Asturian Pre-Romanesque: the vaulting of two overlapping spaces, later used in the buildings of Ramiro I.

As mentioned above, acting as a royal chapel, the Holy Chamber was built to house the jewels and relics of the cathedral of San Salvador in Oviedo, a function it continues to have 1,200 years later. Some of these jewels were donated by the Kings Alfonso II and Alfonso III, and represent extraordinary gold artefacts of Asturian Pre-Romanesque.

The first of them is the Cross of the Angels, created in 808 in Gauzón (the left bank of the estuary of Avilés) on the instructions of Alfonso II of Asturias, who donated the precious stones necessary to make it from his personal treasury. The Cross of the Angels takes its name from the legend that it was made and given to Alfonso II by angels, who appeared to him in the form of pilgrims. The Greek cross (equal arms) has a core of cherry wood and in the centre there is a circular disk acting as connection for the four arms. The inverse is covered with a filigreed mesh of gold thread and bands of geometric decoration with a total of 48 precious stones (agates, sapphires, amethysts, rubies and opals) of great beauty. The reverse is covered with fine sheet of gold held by silver nails. Decoration on this side shows, mounted on the central disk, a large elliptical agate cameo, and a large stone at the end of each arm.

Exactly one century later, in 908, to commemorate a hundred years of the Asturían kingdom's victories and conquests, Alfonso III donated Pre-Romanesque most important gold artifact to Oviedo Cathedral: the Victory Cross or Santa Cruz, a Latin cross (unequal arms) of 92 cm by 72 cm. The core is made of two pieces of oak with circular ends finished in three foils, and joined in the centre by a circular disk. The whole cross is covered with gold leaf and filigree, and richly decorated especially the inverse, covered with coloured enamel, pearls, precious stones and gold thread. The reverse shows an inscription in soldered gold letters, mentioning the donors to the Church of San Salvador, King Alfonso III and Queen Jimena, and the place (Gauzón Castle again) and the year it was made.

The last of the Pre-Romanesque jewels on in the Holy Chamber of the Cathedral of Oviedo is the Agate box, donated to the church by Fruela II of Asturias (son of Alfonso II), and his wife Nunilo, in the year 910, when he was still a prince. This extraordinary gold artifact in mozarabic style is a rectangular reliquary made from cypress with a semi-pyramidal shaped lid. It is covered with gold plate, with 99 little arch shaped openings, framed in woven gold thread, containing agates. The most valuable part of this piece is the upper part of the lid, probably re-used from another, smaller reliquary of Carolingian origin, a hundred years older than the rest. This plaque is decorated with panels of enamel, in turn surrounded by 655 encrusted garnets.

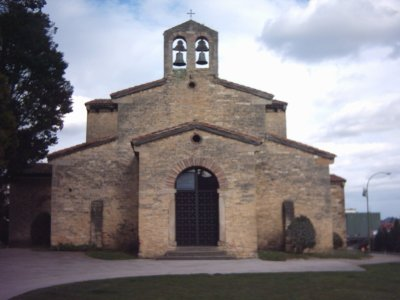
Santullano

Continuing with the architectural works of the second period of Pre-Romanesque art, the last two are the churches of Santa Maria de Bendones and San Pedro de Nora. The first is located just fíve kilometres from the capital, in a south-east direction, towards the Nalón valley, and was a donation from King Alfonso III and his wife Jimena to San Salvador cathedral, on January 20, 905. Very similar to Santullano, although the ground plan is not the typical basilica of the Pre-Romanesque churches, but has three enclosures at the western end, the central one as an entrance vestibule and two side areas possibly to house parishioners or ecciesiastics. This entrance leads into a single nave with a wooden ceiling, covered by an interesting roof, the same length as the entrance enclosures. The nave adjoins two rectangular side areas, also with a wooden ceiling, whose use seems to associated with the liturgical rites of the period. this nave joined with the sanctuary by three semicircular brick arches, each of which leads into its corresponding chapel, of which only the main or central one is covered with a brick barrel vault, the other two with wooden ceilings.

Above the main chapel is the "typical" chamber, only accessible from outside, through a trefoil window with the standard Pre-Romanesque features; central arch larger than the side ones, resting on two free-standing capitals with rope moulding, and the upper rectangle framed by simple moulding.

Independent from the church structure, though close to its southern facade, stands the bell tower, on a rectangular ground plan.

The Church of San Pedro de Nora is located beside the River Nora, about twelve kilometres from Oviedo. This church has the construction style established in Santullano: facing eastwards, vestibule separate from the main structure, basilica-type ground plan, central nave higher than the side aisles, with intersecting wooden roof and lit by Windows with stone lattice. The straight sanctuary is divided into three apses with barrel vaults. As a differentiating element, the apses were joined to each other through the dividing walls by semicircular-arched doors. Like all the churches from this period, there was a room over the apse, only accessible from outside through a trefoil window. The bell tower, separate from the church like in Santa Maria de Bendones, does not belong to the original construction, and stems from an initiative in the seventies by the architect and great restorer of Asturian Pre-Romanesque, Luis Menéndez Pidal y Alvarez.

=== Third period (842 to 866) ===
This period corresponds with the reigns of Ramiro I and Ordoño I. The first, son of Vermudo I, succeeded Alfonso II when he died without descendants, taking charge of a rapidly expanding kingdom. He was described by chroniclers as Virga justitiae (baton of justice) because he had to face two internal rebellions by noblemen and due to his enthusiasm in hunting down magic and the black arts, very widespread in Asturias at the time. He also fought the Normans successfully, defeating them in Gijón and A Coruña. Paradoxically, he enjoyed a time of peace with his traditional enemies, the Muslims, which from an artistic point of view allowed him to substantially renew Pre-Romanesque's architecture and decorative style, giving rise to the so-called Ramirian style.

Ramiro I was succeeded by his son Ordoño I, who inherited a very solid kingdom from a military perspective, a condition that let him use subjects from the kingdom of Asturias to re-populate abandoned cities on the other side of the mountains, such as Tui, Astorga and León. He measured his military might against the Arabs with varying results; in the battle of Clavijo (year 859) he easily defeated them, though six years later, at Hoz de la Morcuera, his army, led by one of his generals, suffered a defeat, halting the intense re-population work of the first part of his reign.

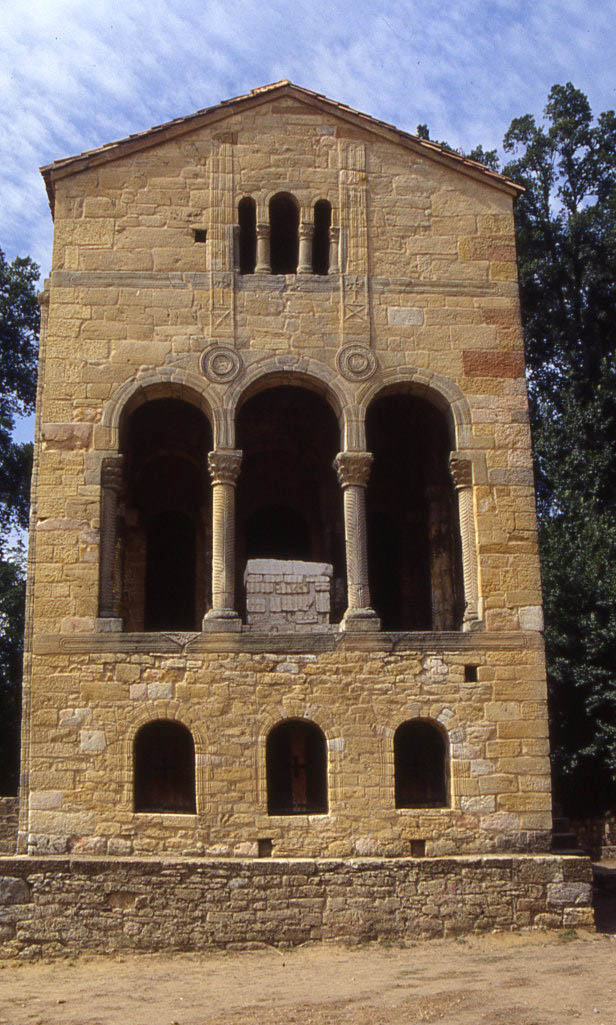
Santa María del Naranco

The first of the works from this period, the Palace of Santa María del Naranco, involved a significant stylistic, morphological, constructive and decorative renovation of Pre-Romanesque, supplementing it with new, innovative resources, representing a leap forward with respect to immediately previous periods. Built as a recreational palace, it is situated on the southern side of Monte Naranco facing the city, and was originally part of a series of royal buildings located in the outskirts. Its character as a civil building changed in the 12th century when it was converted into a church dedicated to St. Mary.

This palace's innovations amazed chroniclers, who repeatedly mention it over time. A case in point is the Crónica Silense, written around the year 1015, about 300 years after its construction, and which, on describing Ramiro I, states that "(...)he built many constructions, two miles away from Oviedo, with sandstone and marble in a vaulted work: (...) He also made (...), a palace without wood, of admirable construction and vaulted below and above,...".

What marvelled the chroniclers for so many centuries were its proportions and slender shapes, its rich, varied decoration and the introduction ofelongated barrel vaults thanks to the transverse arches, allowing support and eliminating wooden ceilings. This solution, timidly advanced in the Holy Chamber, fully matured in Santa Maria del Naranco.

The palace, on a rectangular ground plan, has two floors; the lower level, or crypt, quite low, has a central chamber and another two located on either side. The upper floor is accessed via a double exterior stairway adjoining the facade, leading into an identical layout as the lower floor; a central or noble hall with six blind semicircular arches along the walls, supported by columns built into the wall, and a mirador at each end. These are accessed via three arches, similar to those onto the wall, resting on columns with helicoidal rope moulding, typical of Pre-Romanesque. The barrel vault is made from tufa stone, and is held up by six transverso arches resting on consoles.

Santa Maria del Naranco represented a step forward from a decorative point of view by enriching the habitual standards and models with elements from painting, gold work and the textile arts. The rich decoration is concentrated in the hall and miradors of the upper floor, where there are cubic-prismatic capitals (of Byzantine influence), decorated with reliefs framed by cord decoration (from local tradition) in trapezoid and triangular shapes, inside which there are sculpted forms of animals and humans. This kind of motif is repeated on the disks with central medallions located above the blind arches' intersections. The 32 medallions distributed around the building are similar in size and shape, varying the decorative designs and the interior figures (quadrupeds, birds, bunches of grapes, fantastic animáis), a style inherited from the Visigoth period, in turn descended from Byzantine tradition.

The medallions have decorative bands above them, again framed by rope moulding, inside which four figures are sculpted and arranged symmetrically; the upper two carrying loads on their heads and the lower two representing soldiers on horseback carrying swords. These figures seem to have some kind of symbolic social meaning; the warriors who defend and support the men of prayer (here offerers), or alternatively, the royal and ecclesiastic orders complementing each other.

Santa María del Naranco shows other, equally beautiful and important sculptural elements; for the first time, a Greek cross appears sculpted as emblem of the Asturian monarchy, at the same time protecting the building from all evil, something which was to become habitual in the popular architecture of towns and villages. Other sculptural elements, such as the capitals of Corinthian inspiration on the miradors' triple-arched Windows or the altar stone in the eastern mirador (originally from the neighbouring Church of San Miguel de Liño/Lillo), make this palace the most distinctive building in Pre-Romanesque, a singularity highlighted by being the only palace complex that has lasted until the present day with both Visigothic and Carolingian court structures.

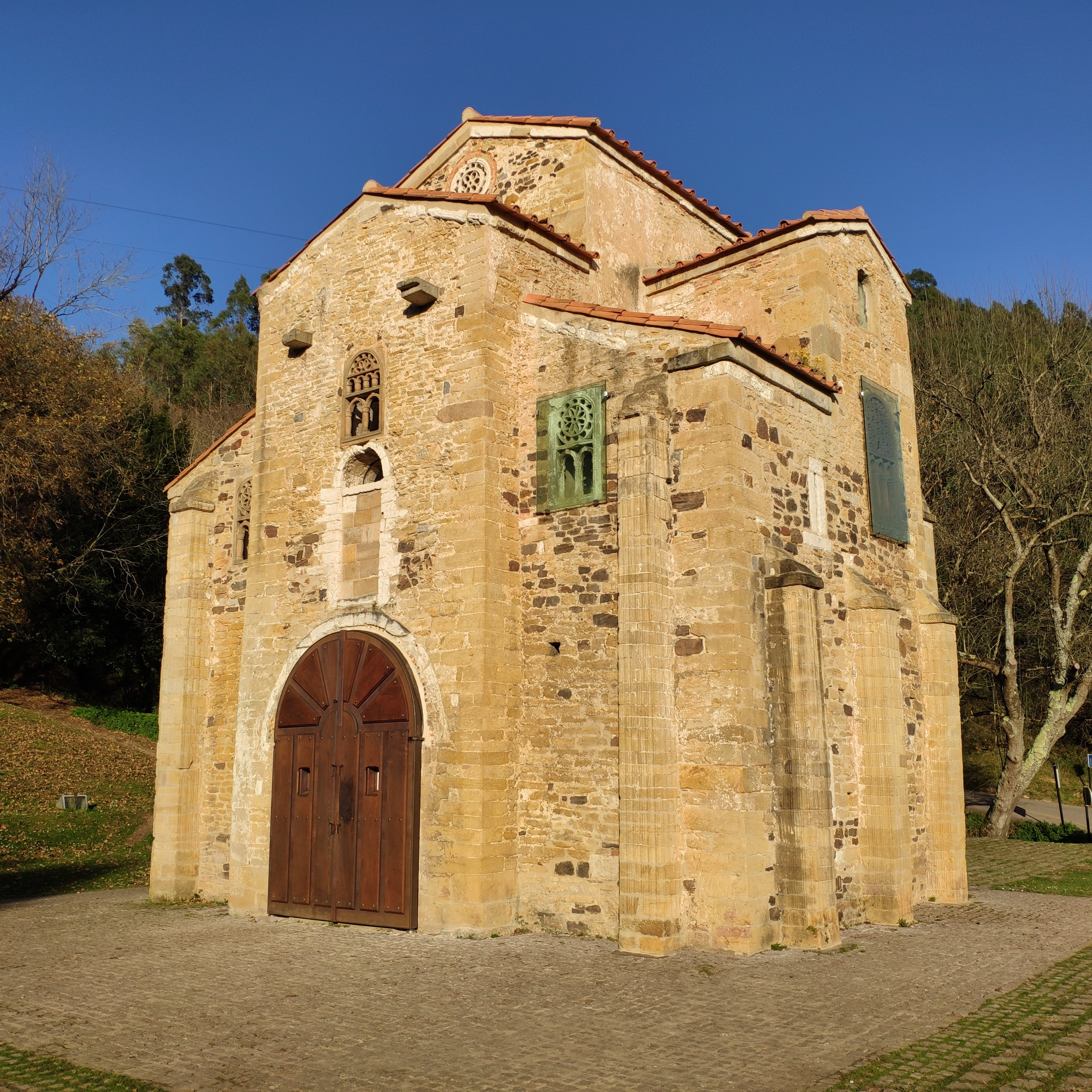
San Miguel de Lillo

The church of San Miguel de Lillo was consecrated by Ramiro I and his wife Paterna in the year 848. It was originally dedicated to St. Mary until, as mentioned above (and shown by the altar located in the eastern mirador of santa María del Naranco), this worship passed to the nearby palace in the 12th century, leaving this church dedicated to St. Michael.

Ground plan

It originally had a basilica ground plan, three aisles with a barrel vault, although part of the original structure has disappeared as the building fell into decay during the 12th or 13th century. Nowadays, it conserves its western half from that period, together with several elements in the rest of the church such as the fantastic jambs in the vestibule or the extraordinary lattice on the window of the southern wall, sculpted from one single piece of stone.

The last of the churches from this period is Santa Cristina de Lena, located in the Lena district, about 25 km south of Oviedo, on an old Roman road that joined the lands of the plateau with Asturias. The church has a different ground plan to Pre-Romanesque´s traditional basilica. It is a single rectangular space with a barrel vault, with four adjoining structures located in the centre of each facade. The first of these annexes is the typical Asturian Pre-Romanesque vestibule, with a royal tribune on the upper part, accessed via a stairway joined to one of the walls. To the east is the enclosure with the altar, with a single apse, foregoing the traditional Asturian pre-romanesque triple apse, and going back to Visigoth influences. To the north and south respectively, there are two other enclosures through semicircular arches and barrel vaults, whose use was associated with the Hispano-Visigothic liturgy practised in Spain up to the 11th century.

One of the most particular elements of Santa Cristina de Lena is the existence of the presbytery elevated above floor level in the last section of the central nave, separated from the area intended for the congregation by three arches on marble columns. This separation, which appears in other Asturian churches, is not repeated in any other with a similar structure. Both the lattices over the arches and the wall enclosing the central arch were re-used from Visigothic origins in the 7th century.

On the outside of the church, there are a large number of buttresses (32) which seem in some cases to have a merely aesthetic function. Nearby this church is the Asturian Pre-Romanesque Information Centre, located in the old Norte de la Cobertoria Railway Station.

=== Fourth period (866 to 910) ===
This comprises the reign of Alfonso III, who came to the throne at the age of 18, on the death of his father, Ordoño I, marking the zenith of the kingdom of Asturias. Expansion against Islam led him to conquer Porto and Coimbra in present-day Portugal, and he pushed the borders of the kingdom as far as the Mondego, repopulating Zamora, Simancas, Toro and the whole area known as Campos Góticos. The idea of the Asturian kingdom as a continuation of the Visigoths in Toledo was fully assumed, involving the obligation to re-conquer all the territory occupied by Muslims. This idea was reflected in the historical chronicles, such as the Crónica Albeldense, written in Oviedo in the year 881, which tells the history of the Gothic kingdom (Ordo Gentis gothorum), followed by the Asturian monarchy (Ordo Gothorum Obetensium fíegnum). The kingdom's moment of expansion and maturity was also reflected in a cultural revitalisation promoted from the court, involving architectural and artistic renewal.

The kingdom's progressive expansion and increasing power also kindled the ambition of Alfonso III's three sons (García I, Ordoño II and Fruela II), who, encouraged by a number of noblemen, dispossessed the king and confined him in the town of Boiges (Boides valley, present-day Valdediós). Even so, they allowed him to lead a final campaign against the Muslims in Zamora, where he was victorious once more. He died on his return, in December of the year 910. Described in the chronicles as "Great King and Emperor" (Magnus Imperatore ImpemtorNoster), the king who had achieved the kingdom's greatest expansion and consolidation since it was founded by Pelayo, could not prevent his since from splitting it into three parts, Asturias, Galicia and Castile-León, meaning the disappearance of the kingdom of Asturias.

San Salvador de Valdediós and Santo Adriano de Tuñón are the two churches built by this monarch, in addition to the Foncalada fountain (fonte incalata) in the centre of Oviedo, and the already-mentioned gold artefacts of the Victory Cross and the Agate box.

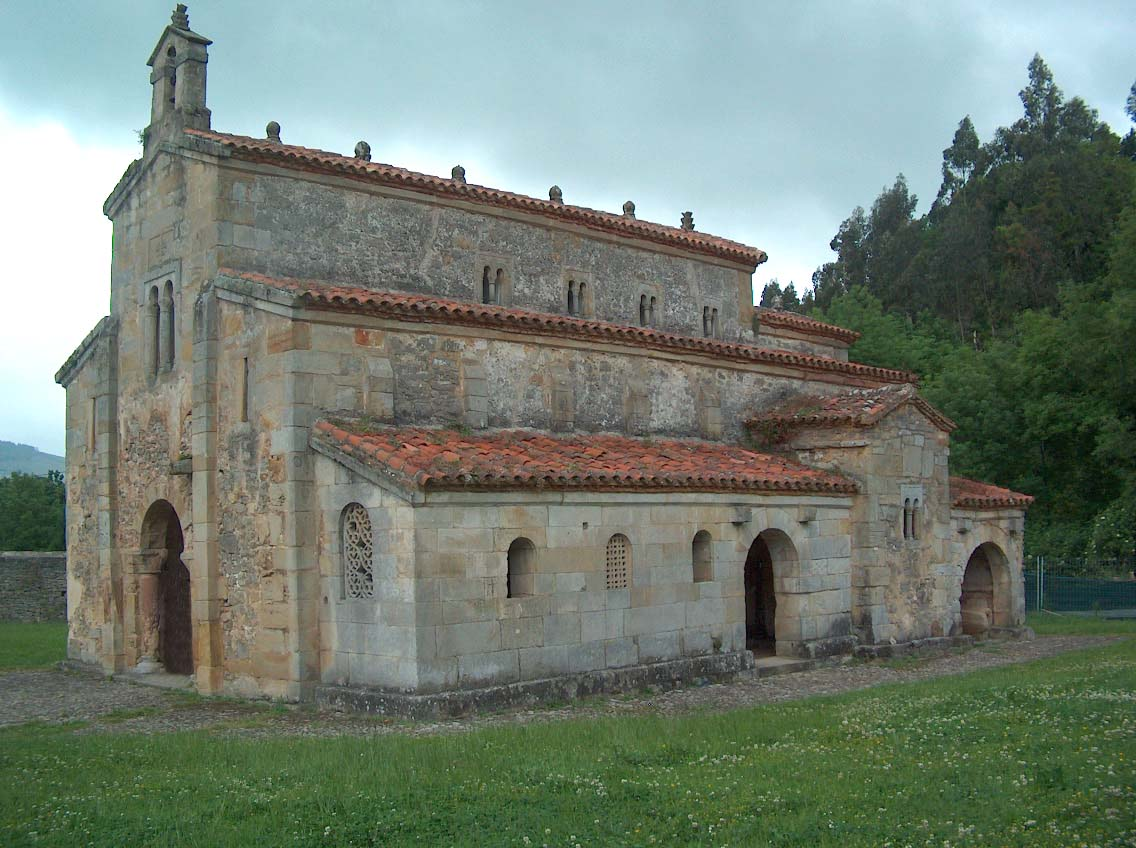
San Salvador de Valdediós monastery

The Church of San Salvador de Valdediós stands in the Boides valley (Villaviciosa), the place where Alfonso III was detained when he was dispossessed by his sons, and where there used to be an old convent governed by the Benedictine Order, substituted in the 13th century by the Cistercians. The church known as the "Bishops' Chapel" was consecrated on September 16, 893, with seven bishops in attendance, and stands on a classic basilica ground plan with a triple sanctuary, separating the central nave from the side aisles with four semicircular arches.

At the western end, there are three enclosures, the central one used as an access vestibule, and two located on the left and right which may have been used to house pilgrims. The vault over the central nave, like the one over the apses, is barrelled with a brick ceiling and decorated with al fresco wall painting, alternating a variety of geometric designs.

Valdediós ground plan

The royal tribune is located above the vestibule, separate from the area intended for the congregation (spatium fidelium) in the central nave, and this from the area devoted to the liturgy by iron grilles, now disappeared. Particular elements of this church include the covered gallery annexed to the southern facade at a later date or Royal Portico, the 50 cm square columns on the central naves arches, the triple-arched window open in the central apse, and the room above it, exclusively accessed from the exterior by a window which here has two openings, compared with the habitual three.

The Church of Santo Adriano de Tuñón is located on the bank of the River Trubia, next to an old Roman road. Founded on January 24, 891, it stands on a classic basilica ground plan, although in the 17th and 18th centuries it was extended with a nave structure at the western end, and a bell gable. The al fresco paintings in this church are the only remains of Mozarabic painters' work in an Asturian art workshop.

Finally, the Foncalada fountain, the only upper medieval civil construction conserved in Spain, was built on the outside of Oviedo city walls, with stone blocks and an intersecting roof, barrel vault and rectangular ground plan. The intersection of the roof is topped with a triangular pediment, sculpted with the Victory Cross, characteristic of Alfonso III, under which runs the typical inscription of the kingdom of Asturias:

Hoc signo tvetvr pivs, hoc signo vincitvr inimicvs

=== Fifth period (910 to 925) ===
With Alfonso III dead and the kingdom of Asturias divided among his sons, Asturian Pre-Romanesque entered its last stage with two constructions. The first of them is the Church of San Salvador de Priesca (a few kilometres from Valdediós), consecrated on September 24, 921, which has the architectural and decorative reference of the model laid down by Santullano, and not subsequent works. In the 17th and 18th centuries, it underwent several reconstructions, altering especially the structures adjoining the vestibule, by communicating them with the side aisles.

The Church of Santiago de Gobiendes, located near Colunga, next to the sea and the Sueve mountain range, is the last of the Pre-Romanesque churches, and like the previous one, follows the Santullano construction model. In the 17th and 18th centuries, it underwent significant reform, altering the entrance, facade, main and side chapels.

== See also ==
- La Cava Bible
- Beatus of Liébana
