= San Tirso, Oviedo =

Church of Saint Thyrsus Iglesia de San Tirso (in Spanish)
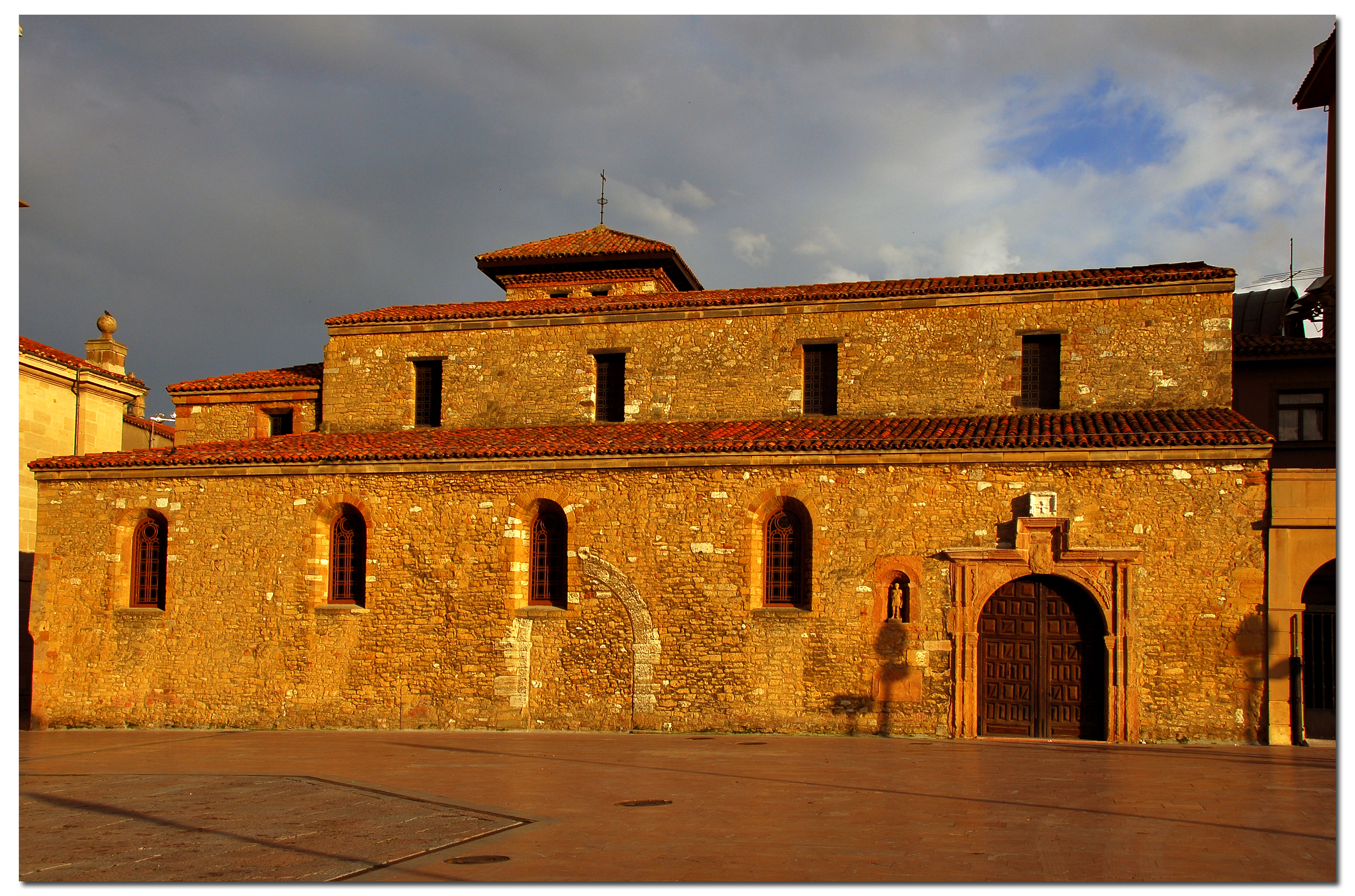

Religion
- Affiliation: Roman Catholic
- Province: Asturias
- Ecclesiastical or organizational status: Church

Location
- Location: Oviedo, Spain
- Interactive map of Church of Saint Thyrsus; Iglesia de San Tirso (in Spanish)
- Coordinates: 43°21′43.84″N 5°50′37.56″W

Architecture
- Architect: Tioda
- Type: Church
- Style: Pre-Romanesque, Romanesque
- Completed: 9th century

Website
- Official Website

The Church of Saint Thyrsus (Spanish: Iglesia de San Tirso; or Iglesia de San Tirso el Real de Oviedo; Asturian: Ilesia de Santiso'l Real) is a Roman Catholic Asturian Romanesque church situated in Oviedo, in Asturias, northern Spain. The church was established in the 790s. Dedicated to Saint Thyrsus, it was built by Tioda, the royal architect of Alfonso II of Asturias. The Great Fire of Oviedo in 1521 and rebuilding in the 18th century removed most of the original church, except for a three-light window.

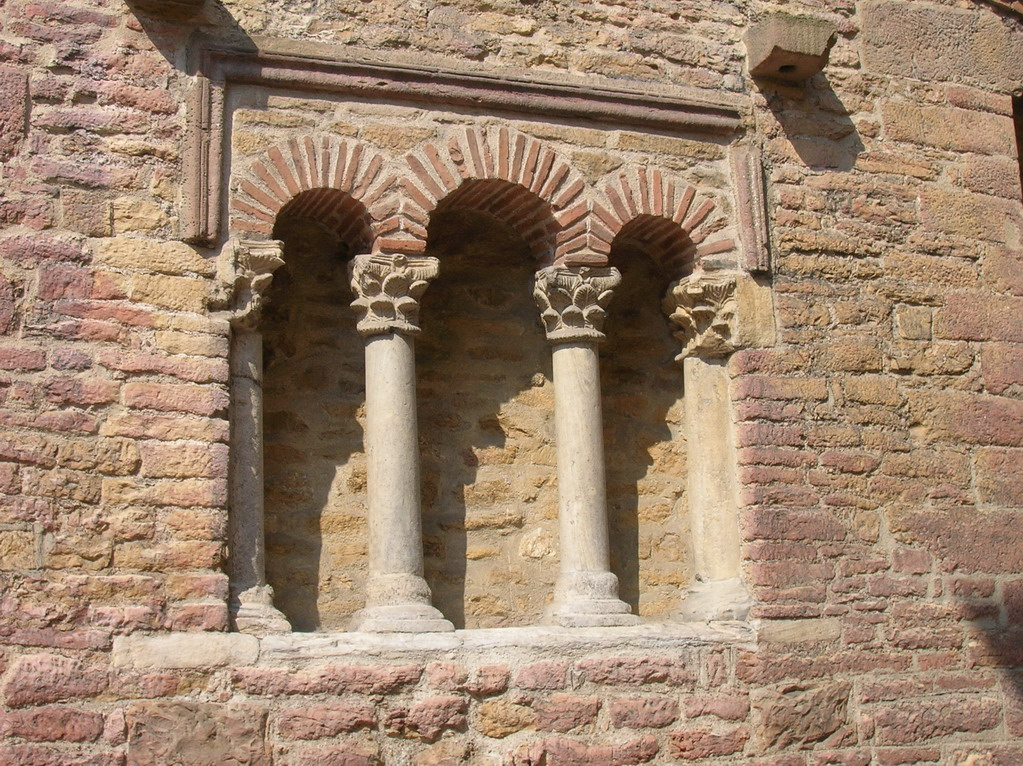
Original three-light window of the church.

== Building ==
The building has suffered so much from alterations over the centuries and only the general plan has been preserved. It is that of a basilica with nave and aisles divided by rude stone piers set at unequal intervals, from which round arches spring. In the easternmost bay, however, owing to the smaller span, the arch was made sufficiently pointed to raise its crown to the same height as the others. This irregularity was already typical of Imperial Roman times, when barrel vaults were given a pointed form in order to make the height of rooms of varying size uniform, as it was necessary to raise the crown of the vault in some of them. This is illustrated by various chambers in the House of Tiberius on the Palatine.

There is no satisfactory explanation of the "many angels" the building is said to have presented in the Codex Vigilianus.

In the rectangular sanctuary atriplet round-arched window (2 by 2 metres (6.6 ft × 6.6 ft) is preserved. With its pre-romanesque bases, rough brick arches, and capitals with rude packed leaves, it gives an idea of the better style of building and carving in the time of Alfonso II of Asturias. It is known that the church of San Tirso housed Royal Chapel.

== See also ==
- Asturian architecture
- Catholic Church in Spain
