= Iglesia de San Juan el Real (Llamas) =

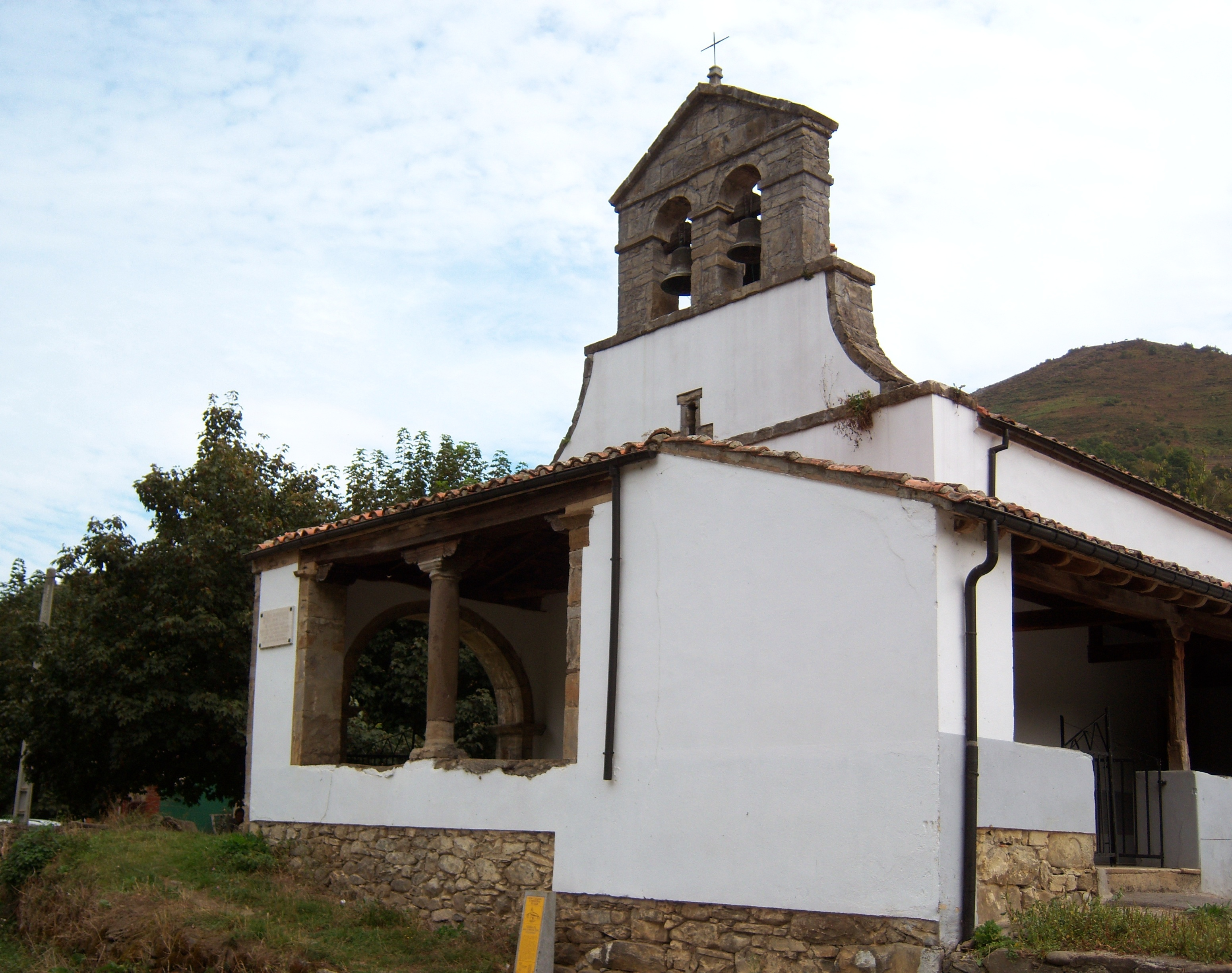
- Iglesia de San Juan el Real (Llamas)
- 43.1092°N 5.5211°W
- Location: Asturias, Spain

Iglesia de San Juan el Real (Llamas) is a church in Asturias, Spain. It was established in 857.

== See also ==
- Asturian art
- Catholic Church in Spain
- Churches in Asturias
- List of oldest church buildings
