= San Juan el Real, Oviedo =

Coordinates: 43°21′54″N 5°51′03″W

Iglesia de San Juan el Real (Oviedo)
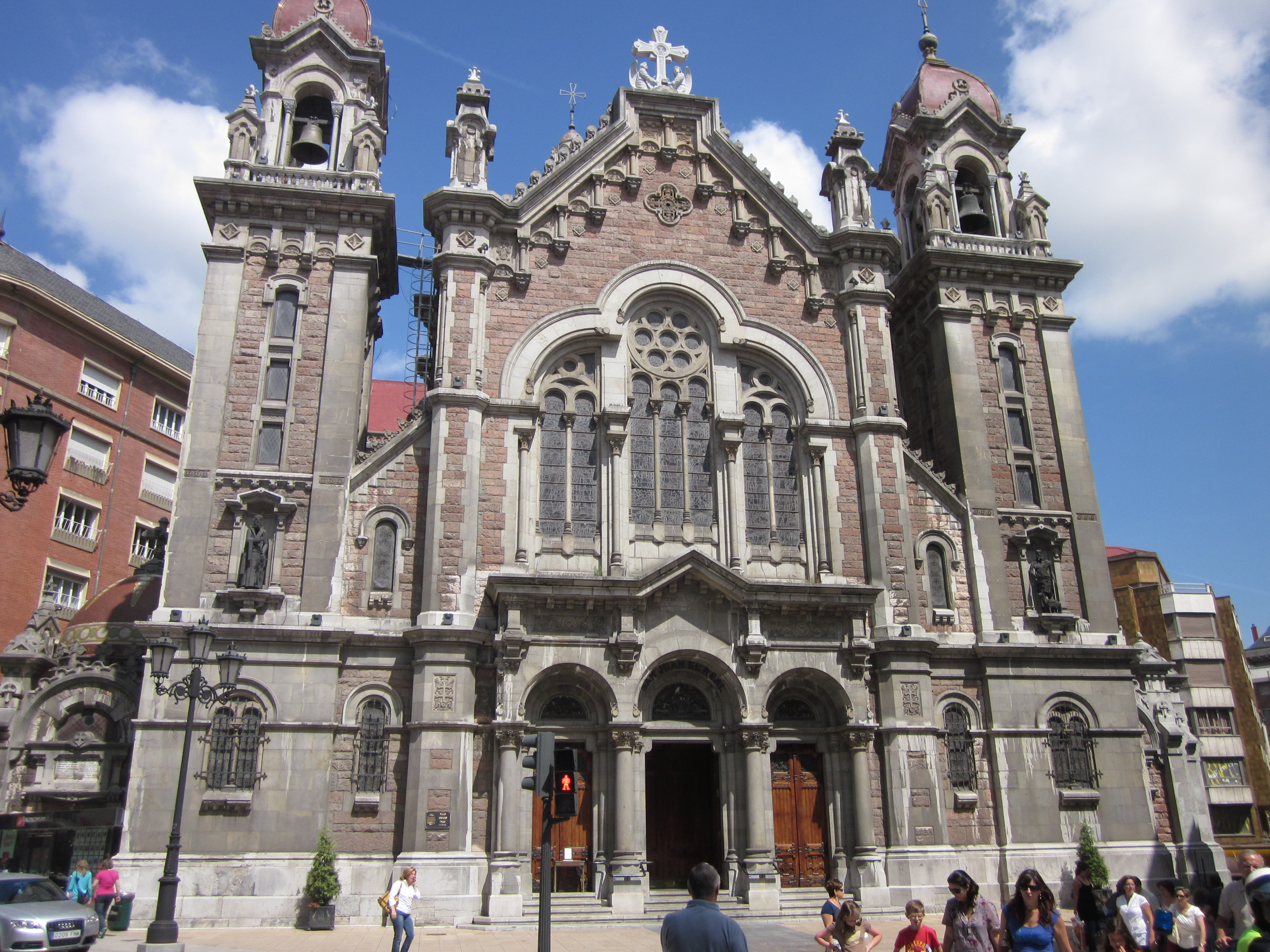
- Iglesia de San Juan el Real (Oviedo)
- Location: Oviedo, Asturias, Spain

Iglesia de San Juan el Real is a church in Oviedo, Asturias, Spain. It was established in 1912. Francisco Franco was married in the church in 1923.

Additional historical detail, from the source (translated from Spanish):

The foundation of the church building was started in 1912 on a site that had been occupied by another church that was demolished in 1882 with design by architect Luis Bellido being completed in 1915. The church has a Latin cross with side chapels and dome.

PARISH SAINT JOHN THE REAL OVIEDO . As composed by history, Alfonso III the Great built in the year 862 an altar dedicated to San Juan Bautista, next to his palace, which in 1006 was donated by Alfonso VI. A hospital for the poor was established and pilgrims came ... the date not materialized for the first parish church of the parish of San Juan el Real. [Source:]

In November 2014, as the present church building was about to celebrate its 100th anniversary, the Pope elevated the status of this historic place of worship from church (Iglesia de San Juan el Real) to a minor Basilica. Today we can properly refer to el Parroquia de San Juan el Real. Source:

== See also ==
- Asturian art
- Catholic Church in Spain
