= Church of San Salvador de Priesca =

Roman Catholic church in Asturias, Spain

Church of the Holy Saviour of Priesca
- Iglesia de San Salvador de Priesca
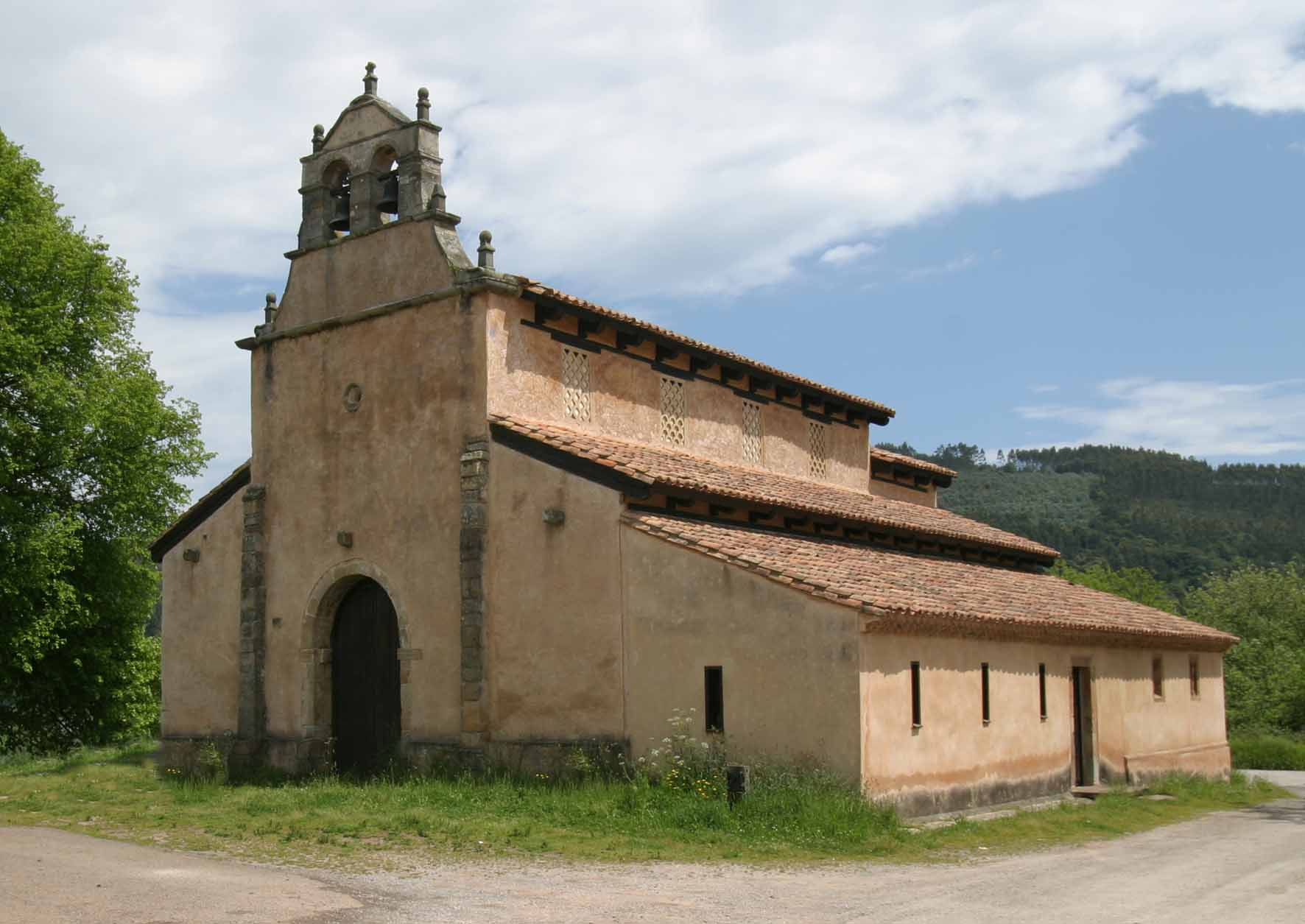

Religion
- Affiliation: Roman Catholic
- Ecclesiastical or organizational status: Church
- Year consecrated: 921

Location
- Location: Villaviciosa (Asturias), Spain
- Interactive map of Church of the Holy Saviour of Priesca
- Coordinates: 43°29′6.5″N 5°21′31.3″W

Architecture
- Type: Church
- Style: Pre-Romanesque
- UNESCO World Heritage Site
- Type: Cultural
- Criteria: ii, iv, vi
- Designated: 1993 (17th session)
- Parent listing: Routes of Santiago de Compostela: Camino Francés and Routes of Northern Spain
- Reference no.: 669bis-013
- Region: Europe and North America
- Spanish Cultural Heritage
- Type: Non-movable
- Criteria: Monument
- Designated: 5 February 1913
- Reference no.: RI-51-0000127

Holy Saviour of Priesca (Spanish: Iglesia de San Salvador de Priesca) is a Roman Catholic pre-romanesque church, located in Priesca, next to Villaviciosa, Asturias, northern Spain. Only a few kilometres from the Church of San Salvador de Valdediós, it is amongst the latest examples of Asturian architecture.

== Architecture ==
With Alfonso III dead and the kingdom of Asturias divided among his sons, Asturian pre-romanesque architecture entered its last stage. Consecrated on September 24, 921, it has the architectural and decorative reference of the model laid down by the Church of San Julián de los Prados.

In the 17th and 18th centuries, it underwent several reconstructions, altering especially the structures adjoining the vestibule, by communicating them with the side aisles. In 1936, during the Spanish civil war, the original roof burned but it kept most of its sculptured decoration and original paintings.

== See also ==
- Asturian art
- Catholic Church in Spain

== Sources ==
- Dodds, Jerrilynn (1990). Architecture and Ideology in Early Medieval Spain. University Park: Pennsylvania State University Press. ISBN 0-271-01325-7.
