= Coat of arms of Asturias =

- Adopted: 1984
- Crest: Spanish Royal Crown
- Shield: Azure, the Cross of Asturias (called that of Victory) Or garnished with precious stones proper, a majuscule Alpha and minuscule Omega pendant from its dexter and sinister arms respectively; and in two lines, in letters Or, the legend Hoc Signo Tvetvr Pivs/Hoc Signo Vincitvr Inimicvs, the first line in the dexter flank and the second in the sinister.

The coat of arms of Asturias was adopted on 27 April 1984.

The oldest attributed arms of the Principality of Asturias date from the 16th century, and show a quartered shield with the castle of the Kingdom of Castile, the lion of León and a goblet. But this coat of arms is wrongly attributed to the Prince and the Principality of Asturias, as proved Gaspar Melchor de Jovellanos, author, philosopher and main figure of the Age of Enlightenment in Spain. This coat of arms appeared in printed books and maps, even It was included in the Encyclopédie of Denis Diderot.

== Description ==
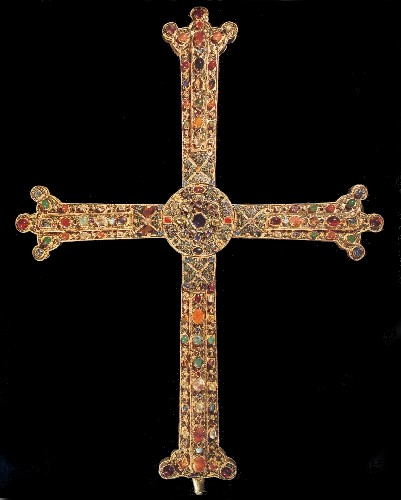
The Victory Cross is the name given to the christian cross carried by King Pelayo of Asturias at the Battle of Covadonga, according to legend or tradition.

The arms consist of a field of azure with the Victory Cross (Spanish: Cruz de la Victoria) of Or adorned by gemstones. The cross is the symbol of the re-conquest of Spain from the Moors. The cross was used, according to the legend or tradition, by the local Visigothic governor Pelagius of Asturias, in the initial battles against the Moors. It was claimed that the cross had brought victory, and it was later gold-plated. However, there is no historical evidence that Pelayo used exactly this same cross.

The Greek letters of alpha and omega are suspended from the left and right bars, respectively. Accompanying the cross is the legend Hoc Signo Tvetvr Pivs/Hoc Signo Vincitvr Inimicvs: "With this sign the pious are safeguarded. With this sign the enemy is conquered."

The arms are "ensigned of a Spanish Royal Crown".

== Usage ==
In 1985 a simplified version of the shield was legislated for exclusive use in the Administration of the Principality.

The arms must appear de jure in:

- Documents that contain the Laws of the General Meeting that the President of the Principality of Asturias in name of the King of Spain promulgates.
- Documents, forms, seals and letterheads of official use of the autonomous community.
- Official publications by the Principality of Asturias.
- Official symbols used by the authorities of the autonomous community.
- Diplomas or titles of any class sent by authorities of the autonomous community.
- Buildings and establishments of the Asturian autonomous community according to the law that regulates it, the shield cannot be used as a symbol of identification by any other public or deprived institution that is not the Principality of Asturias. Any use is not admitted that goes in reduction of its high meaning.

One stays the existing shields in those declared buildings historical-artistic monuments. Also those that appear in those others that they form substantial part of the ornato and decoration.

The Shield of the Principality enjoys the same degree of protection as that of the other symbols of Spain.

== Gallery ==
Simplified image used by the Administration of the Principality.

Second version.

== See also ==
- Flag of Asturias
