= La Foncalada =

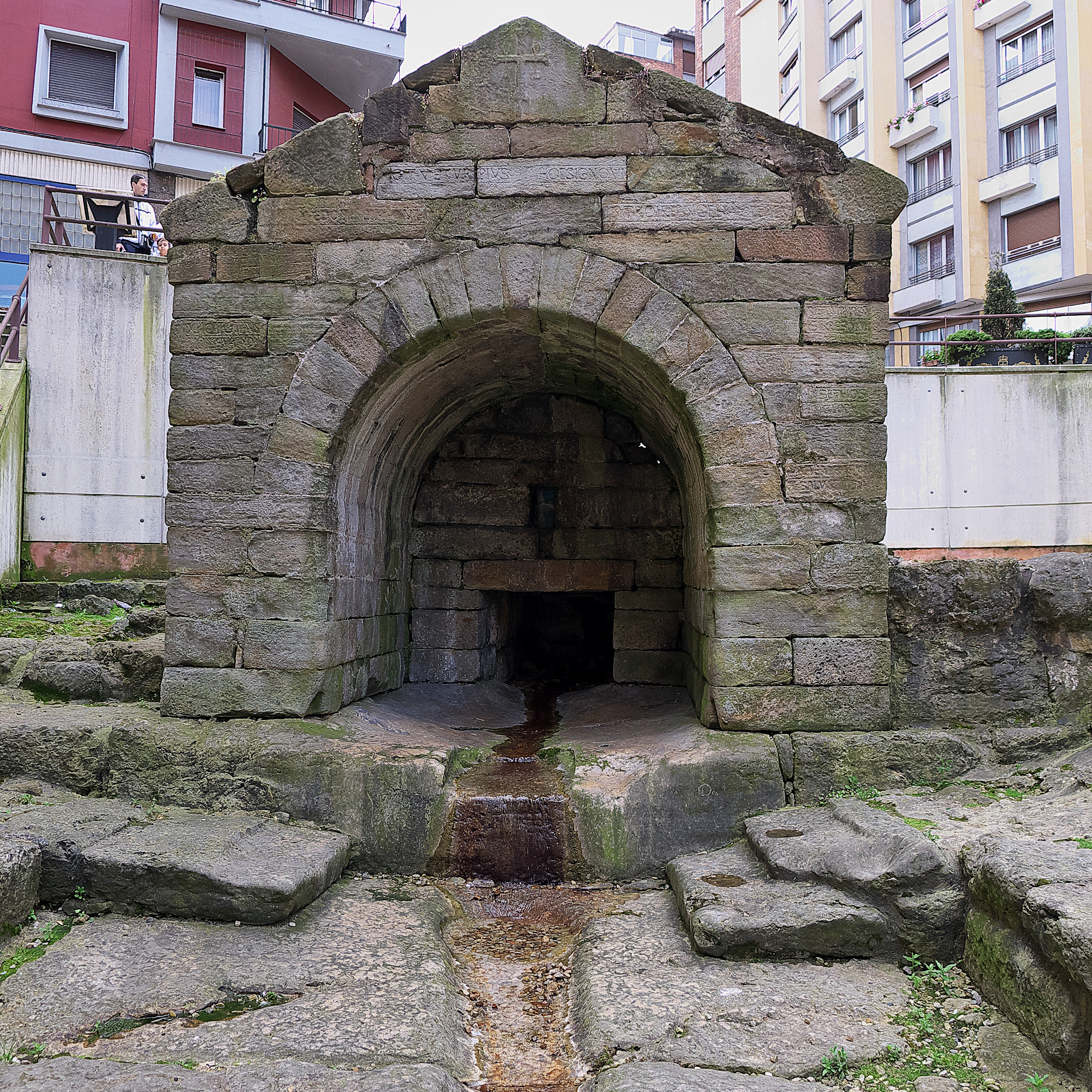

General information
- Type: Fountain
- Location: Oviedo (Asturias), Spain
- Coordinates: 43°21′55.0″N 5°50′45.6″W

UNESCO World Heritage Site
- Official name: La Foncalada
- Type: Cultural
- Criteria: i, ii, iv
- Designated: 1985 (9th session)
- Part of: Monuments of Oviedo and the Kingdom of the Asturias
- Reference no.: 312-006
- Region: Europe and North America
- Area: 0.001 ha (0.0025 acres)
- Buffer zone: 1.58 ha (3.9 acres)

The Foncalada is a fountain of potable water located outside the city walls of Oviedo, Asturias, Spain; it was built by king Alfonso III of Asturias in the 9th century. This building remains the only surviving civil architectural item for public use of the Early Middle Ages. Its name was given after the inscription in Latin: fontem calatam written on it. Built in Pre-Romanesque style, it has been included with other Asturian Pre-Romanesque sites on the UNESCO World Heritage Site List since 1998.

It was originally placed near the city walls, next to an ancient Roman road. The decoration on top depicts the Victory Cross, symbol of Asturias.

== Building ==
This public fountain, which belongs to Oviedo Town Hall, is erected over a spring. The source is a rectangle of about 4 metres (13 ft) wide. It has a shape of a vaulted chapel and is crowned by the royal ensign of the Victory Cross. Below the Asturian Cross, two inscriptions remain:

(Hoc Sign) O Tvetvr Pivs, Hoc Signo Vi (Ncitvr, Inimicvs)
"With this sign the pious are protected, With this sign you shall defeat the enemy"

(Signvm Salvtis Po) Ne Domine In Fonte (Ista Vt Non Permitas) Introire Angelvm Percv (Tientem)
"Lord, put the sign of the salvation on this fountain to not allow hitting angel to enter"

Coat of arms of the Kingdom of the Asturias

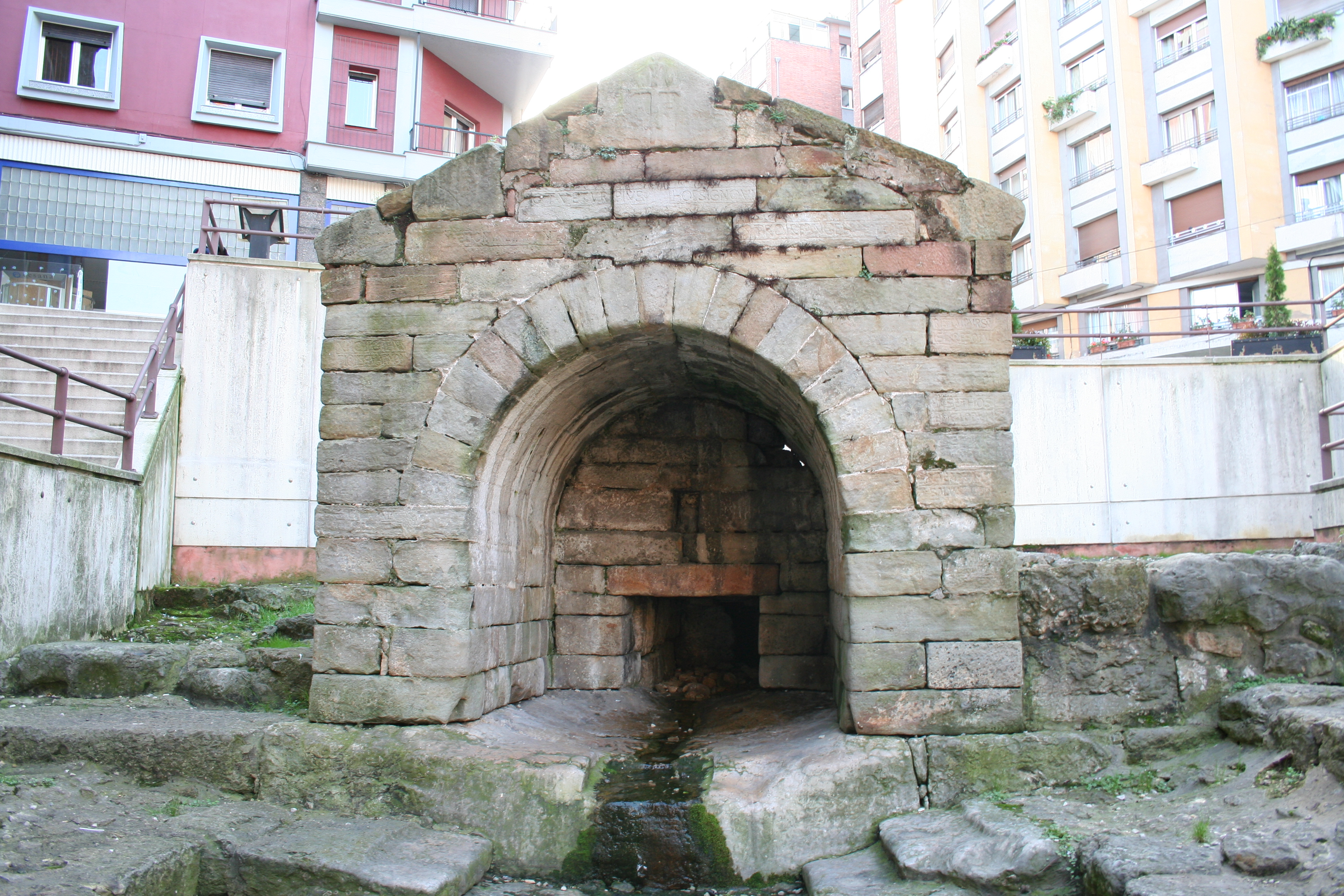
The Foncalada, pre-romanesque fountain in today's city center of Oviedo
