= Church of Santa María de Bendones =

Church in Asturias, Spain

Church of St Mary of Bendones Iglesia de Santa María de Bendones (in Spanish)
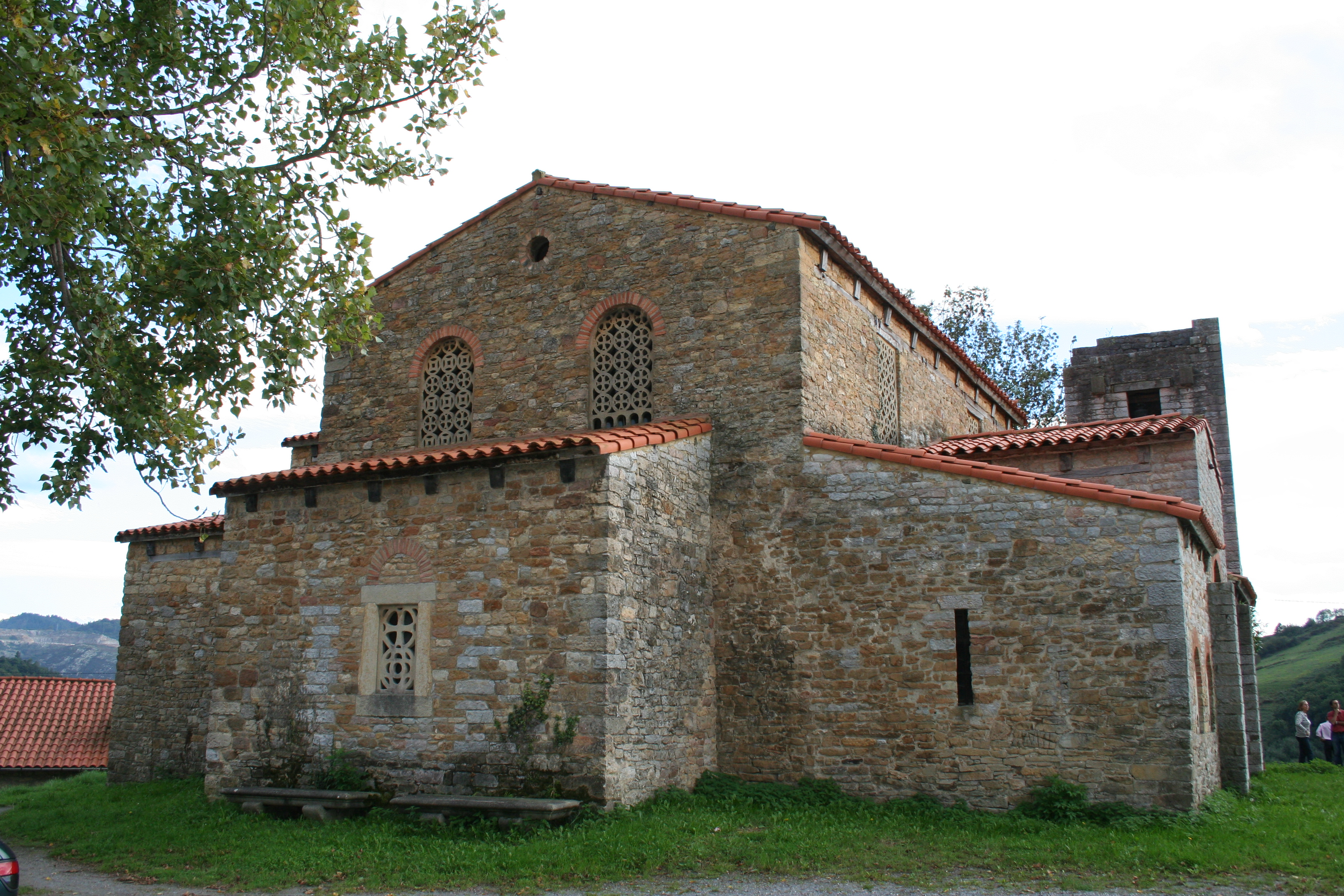

Religion
- Affiliation: Roman Catholic
- Province: Asturias
- Ecclesiastical or organisational status: Inactive
- Year consecrated: 9th century

Location
- Location: Bendones, Spain
- Interactive map of Church of St Mary of Bendones; Iglesia de Santa María de Bendones (in Spanish)
- Coordinates: 43°20′9.6″N 5°48′22.7″W

Architecture
- Type: Church
- Style: Pre-Romanesque

Specifications
- Direction of façade: E
- Length: 18 metres (59 ft)
- Width: 18 metres (59 ft)

St. Mary of Bendones (Spanish: Santa María de Bendones) is an Asturian Pre-Romanesque Roman Catholic church situated in Bendones, Spain, built between 792 and 842.

It was designated a Spanish National Monument in 1958. It has an arcade with side chapels as well as a three-part head with a large transept.

== Architecture ==
The structure is similar to the church of San Julián de los Prados, although the ground plan is not the typical basilica of the Pre-Romanesque churches, but has three enclosures at the western end, the central one as an entrance vestibule and two side areas possibly to house parishioners or ecclesiastics. This entrance leads into a single nave with a wooden ceiling, the same length as the entrance enclosures. The nave adjoins two rectangular side areas, also with a wooden ceiling, whose use seems to associated with the liturgical rites of the period. this nave joined with the sanctuary by three semicircular brick arches, each of which leads into its corresponding chapel, of which only the main or central one is covered with a brick barrel vault, the other two with wooden ceilings.

Above the main chapel is the "typical" chamber, only accessible from outside, through a trefoil window with the standard Pre-Romanesque features; central arch larger than the side ones, resting on two free-standing capitals with rope moulding, and the upper rectangle framed by simple moulding.

Independent from the church structure, though close to its southern facade, stands the bell tower, on a rectangular ground plan.

== See also ==
- Catholic Church in Spain

== Sources ==
- Luis Menéndez Pidal y Alvarez, Santa María de Bendones, Oviedo: Reconstrucción, Instituto de Estudios Asturianos, 1974 ISBN 978-84-600-6009-3
- Arias Paramo, Lorenzo (1992). "Geometría y proporción en la arquitectura prerrománica asturiana". Actas del III Congreso de Arqueología Medieval Española (in Spanish). Oviedo: Universidad de Oviedo: 27–37. ISBN 978-84-604-1916-7.
- Arias, Lorenzo (1999). La Pintura Mural En El Reino De Asturias En Los Siglos IX y X. Oviedo: Libreria Cervantes. ISBN 84-923608-1-X.
- Gutierrez, Sara (2002). Rutas Del Prerromanico En Asturias. Clearwater: Jaguar Books. ISBN 84-89960-32-1.
- Prerrománico Asturiano. El arte de la monarquía Asturiana. Gijón, 1999. Editorial Trea ISBN 84-95178-39-7
- A la búsqueda del prerrománico olvidado (2 Tomos). Gijón, 1999. Author: Francisco Monge Calleja ISBN 84-931350-0-3
- Guía del prerómanico: Visigodo, Asturiano, Mozárabe. Madrid, 2005. Editorial: Anaya
