= Bendones =

Parish in Asturias, Spain

Coordinates: 43.3361°N 5.80583°W

- Parish
- Interactive map of Bendones
- Country: Spain
- Autonomous community: Asturias
- Comarca: Oviedo
- Municipality: Oviedo

Area
  - Total: 3.55 km^{2} (1.37 sq mi)
- Elevation: 310 m (1,020 ft)

Population (2005)
  - Total: 210
  - Density: 59/km^{2} (150/sq mi)

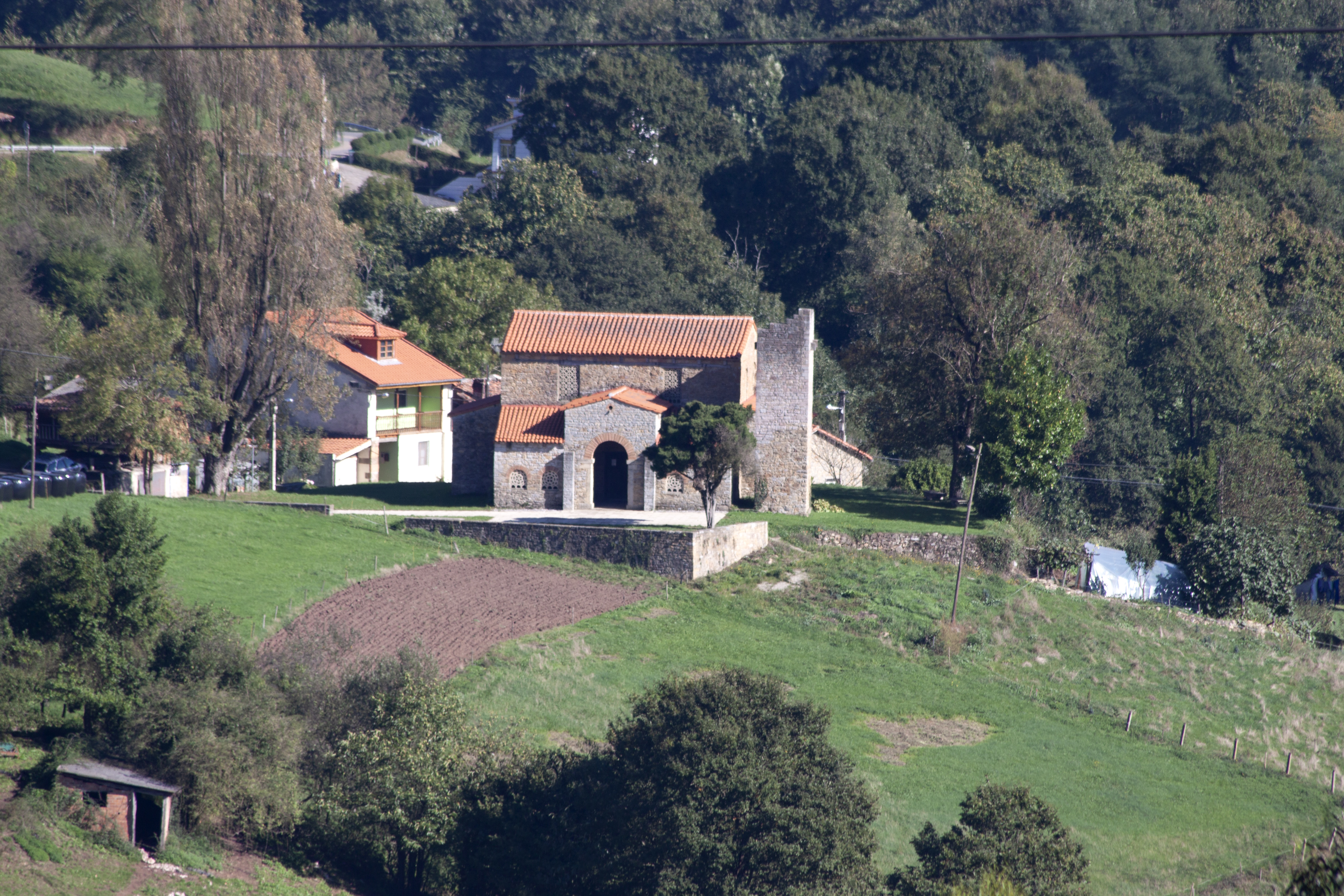
Bendones (Oviedo, Asturias)

Bendones is a parroquia of the municipality of Oviedo in the autonomous community of Asturias, Spain.

Bendones contains a church, Santa María de Bendones, which dates to the time of Alfonso II. It was declared a national monument in 1958.
