= Flag of Asturias =

Asturias
- Asturina, Azuleste
- Use: Civil and state flag
- Proportion: 2:3
- Adopted: December 19, 1990 (current version, as established in Law 4/1990)
- Design: Azure, a Victory Cross Or, shifted to the hoist (A blue field with a golden Victory Cross shifted toward the hoist)
- Formal gala variant
- Use: State flag
- Proportion: 2:3
- Centered variant
- Use: Civil flag
- Proportion: 2:3
- Adopted: 28 May 1785 (original naval ensign design); 5 October 1981 (current version, changed coat of arms)
- Design: The Victory Cross in yellow, centred, over blue.

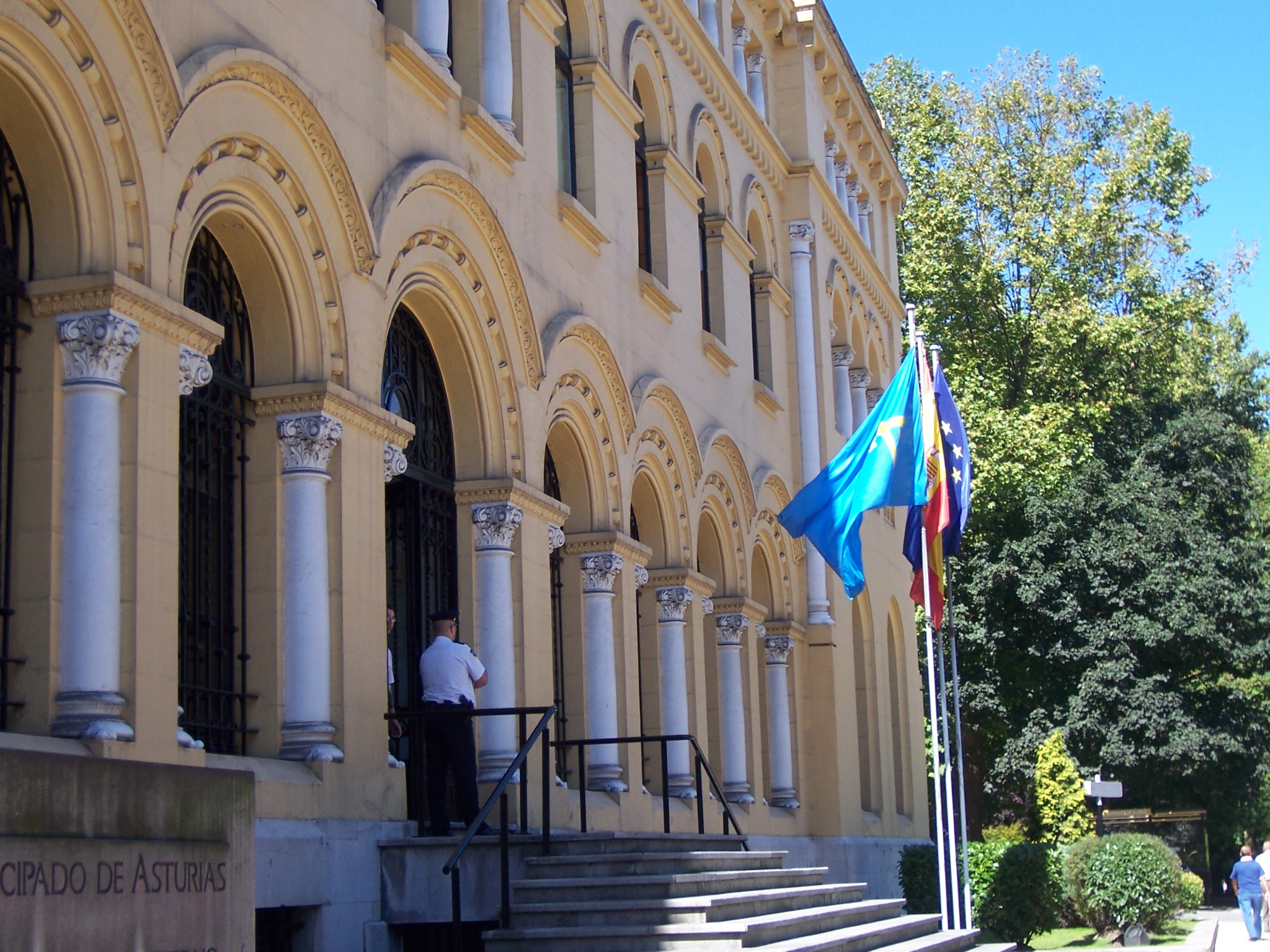
Flags of Asturias, Spain, and the European Union flying in front of the Asturian presidency of government building.

The flag of Asturias is a blue field with a yellow Cruz de la Victoria (English: Victory Cross) shifted towards the hoist. It has served as one of the symbols of Asturias since the late 18th century.

== Design ==
According to the tradition, the Victory Cross was carried by Pelagius, first King of Asturias, in the decisive Battle of Covadonga against the Moors in 722. This battle, fought in the mountains of Asturias, was hailed by 19th and 20th century historiography as the start of the Reconquista, the Christian re-conquest of the Iberian peninsula from the Moorish domination. However, there is no historical evidence about the use of this cross.

In 908 the Asturian King Alfonso III the Great ordered that the original wooden cross, made of oak, be clad in gold and precious stones. Currently, it is kept in the Holy Chamber of the Oviedo Cathedral.

The Greek letters Alpha and Omega hang from its horizontal axis. This is a direct reference to the Book of Revelation (verses 1:8, 21:6, and 22:13), I am the Alpha and the Omega, the beginning and the end, says the Lord God, who is, and who was, and who is to come, the Almighty.

=== Color specifications ===
Scheme	Blue	Yellow
Pantone	829	109
RGB	0-102-255	247-212-23
HTML	#0066FF	#F7D417

== History ==
The banners that might represent the early medieval Kingdom of Asturias are unknown, although a white ensign with a red border and a cross of the same color has been attributed as the royal flag of Ramiro I, as can be seen in tomb A of the Cathedral in Santiago of Compostela. Gaspar Melchor de Jovellanos, an Asturian intellectual of the Enlightenment, led a note with his findings on the symbols of the Kingdom of Asturias, based on the older description of Lázaro Díaz del Valle, an author of 17th Century. According to this instruction, the Victory Cross was gold on a scarlet background, i.e. the early colors of the church.

The origin of the flag of Asturias is in 1808, during the Peninsular War. As there was not any Spanish official flag yet, Asturians created the current flag, without any separatist intention in the war against the Napoleon's empire. In its first version, it included the motto Asturias nunca vencida (Asturias never defeated).

Royal banner of Ramiro I

An attempt to reconstruct the flag of the Kingdom of Asturias as described by de Jovellanos

== See also ==
- Coat of arms of Asturias
