= Tioda =

Prominent Asturian architect of the 9th century

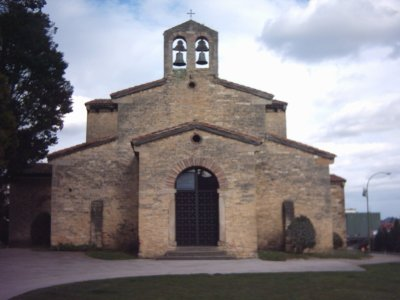
San Julián de los Prados designed by Tioda c.830. The building is now dedicated to the martyred Egyptian saints Julian and Basilissa.

Tioda was a prominent Asturian architect of the 9th century. He worked primarily in Oviedo, where he constructed the church of San Salvador which was later elevated to the rank of cathedral of the Roman Catholic Diocese of Oviedo and the Royal Palace.

His work was recognised and praised by the kings Alfonso II of Asturias and Ramiro I of Asturias and he was paid by the court to design further buildings. The reconstruction of the San Julián de los Prados was ordered by Alfonso II of Asturias around 830 by Tioda. It is considered one of the greatest works of Asturian art and Asturian architecture and was declared a Historical-Artistic Monument by the Spanish Ministry of Culture in June 1917 and a World Heritage Site by UNESCO on 2 December 1998.

He has been called Spain's first "urbanist" for his role in designing and coordinating the major building program in Oviedo, which included urban elements that transformed the city into a royal capital. Due to his unusual name, which has Germanic roots, possibly linked to the Proto-Germanic/Gothic þiuda (people/nation), it was proposed he might have originated from or trained in Aachen, the Carolingian capital, reflecting stylistic parallels between Asturian Pre-Romanesque architecture and Carolingian works, as well as diplomatic contacts between the Asturian court and Charlemagne's circle.

== See also ==
- Asturian architecture
- Pre-Romanesque art and architecture
- Carolingian architecture
