= Castillo de Gauzón =

Ruined castle in Castrillón, Asturias, Spain

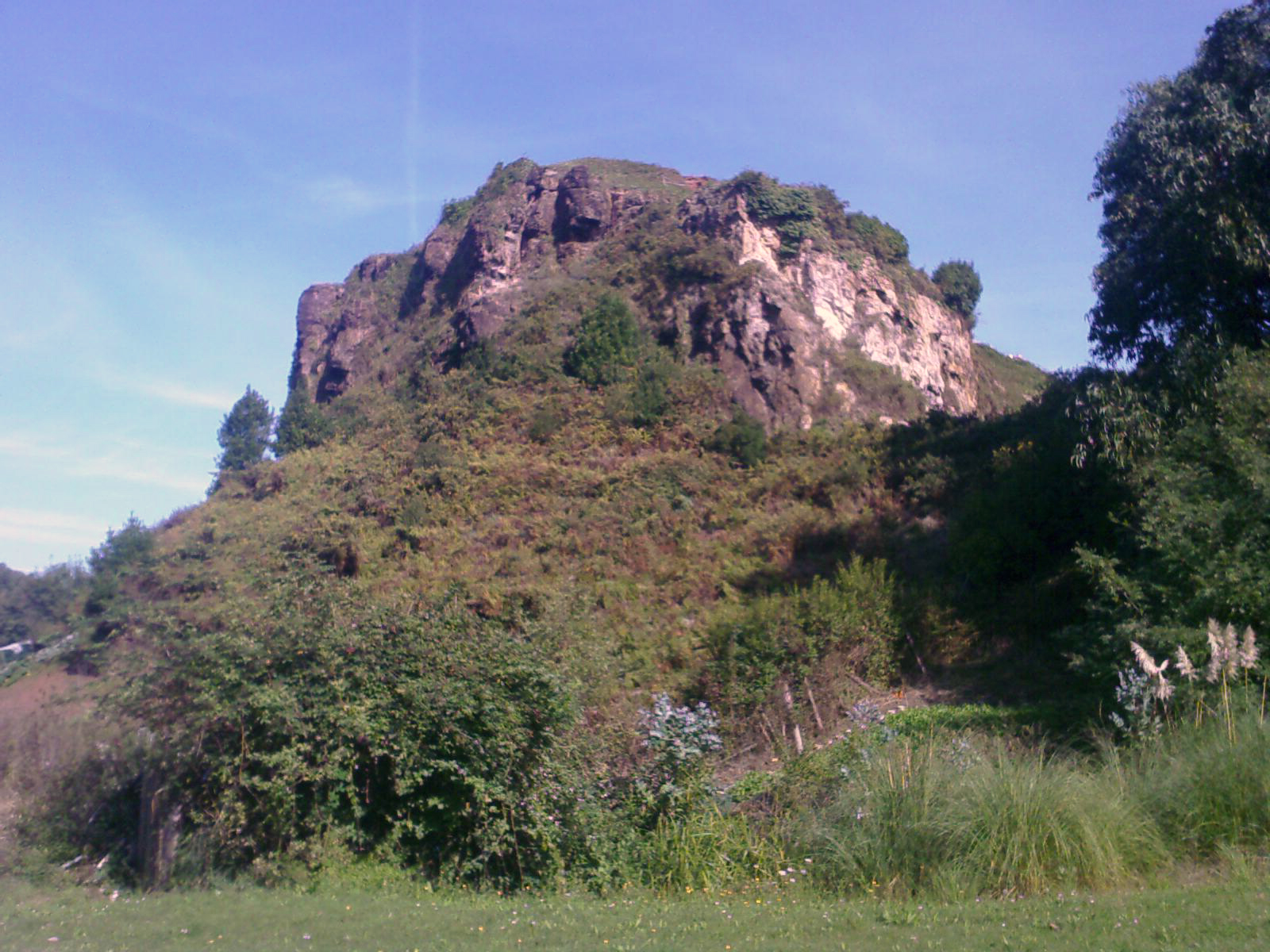
The castle was located on the Peñón de Raíces

Gauzón Castle is located in Raíces Nuevo, in the municipality of Castrillón, Principality of Asturias.Work is currently underway to partially reconstruct the castle, as it had fallen into partial ruin. This was partly due to the fact that many of the stones used to build it were taken by local inhabitants over the centuries to build houses, etc. The castle is of particular importance to the history of Asturias because it was here that the Cross of Victory was covered with precious stones.[1]Gauzón Castle, the most emblematic fortress of the kings of Asturias, is located on a natural promontory called Peñón de Raíces. From its location, it dominated the Avilés estuary and the coastline. In the past, the sea reached the foot of the promontory. When the tide went out, a large area of dunes and marshes was visible. In 1972-77, Vicente José González García led the first excavations. Since 2007, an Archaeological Excavation Project has been underway.In 2013, the staff working on this project found a coin of Visigothic origin, an unusual discovery in northern Spain. It is a gold triente minted by King Recaredo I, which was found in a 9th-century stratum. Given that a hole was made in it, it is thought that it may have been used as a pendant. It is currently on display at the Archaeological Museum of Asturias. The late antique settlement (6th/7th-8th centuries AD): the origins of the Kingdom of Asturias Archaeological excavations have uncovered buildings from a settlement dating back to the 6th-7th centuries AD. These consist of stone and lime mortar walls and various signs of occupation. This evidence points to an enclave linked to a powerful social class that would play an essential role in the formation of the Kingdom of Asturias.

Gauzón Castle: a fortress of the kings of Asturias (8th-10th centuries) From the 8th-9th centuries onwards, the kings of Asturias transformed the settlement, using wide architectural designs with a very complex foundation system in which wooden beams were used. One of these has been dated to the 7th century AD. In the 8th-9th centuries, the kings of Asturias built a monumental gate with a U-shaped floor plan, with two walls or protruding arms flanking and protecting the entrance.

The palatine space: the kings' rooms and the church of San Salvador In the heart of the fortress, the monarchs built structures that reproduced the layout of their palaces in the royal seats. These works can be associated with the reign of Alfonso III and Jimena (866-910). On the one hand, there was a private space with a central room with a hearth or fireplace in the corner and, connected to it, a room that can be interpreted as a bathroom, with drainage channels.

== See also ==
- List of castles in Spain
