= Victory Cross =

10th-century Asturian jewelled cross

Cruz de la Victoria Victory Cross (in English)
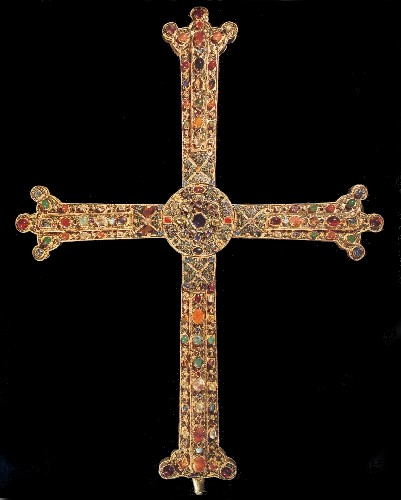
- Picture of the Santa Cruz de la Victoria.
- Material: Various (incl. gold, gems).
- Created: Early Middle Ages (c. 908 AD; core claimed from 8th century)
- Present location: Cámara Santa, Cathedral of San Salvador of Oviedo

The Victory Cross (Asturian and Spanish: Cruz de la Victoria) is an early 10th-century Asturian jewelled cross (crux gemmata) gifted by King Alfonso III of Asturias, who reigned from 866 to 910, to the Cathedral of San Salvador in Oviedo (Asturias, Spain). It was made in 908 in the Castle of Gauzón.

At its core is an oakwood cross, in legend identified with a cross carried by King Pelagius of Asturias when his Christian forces defeated the Umayyad Caliphate troops in the Battle of Covadonga (722), which is regarded as the foundational event of the early medieval Kingdom of Asturias in northern Spain.

Today's Principality of Asturias is one of Spain's 17 autonomous communities, and since December 1990 its official flag bears the Victory Cross on blue background, offset towards the hoist.

== History ==
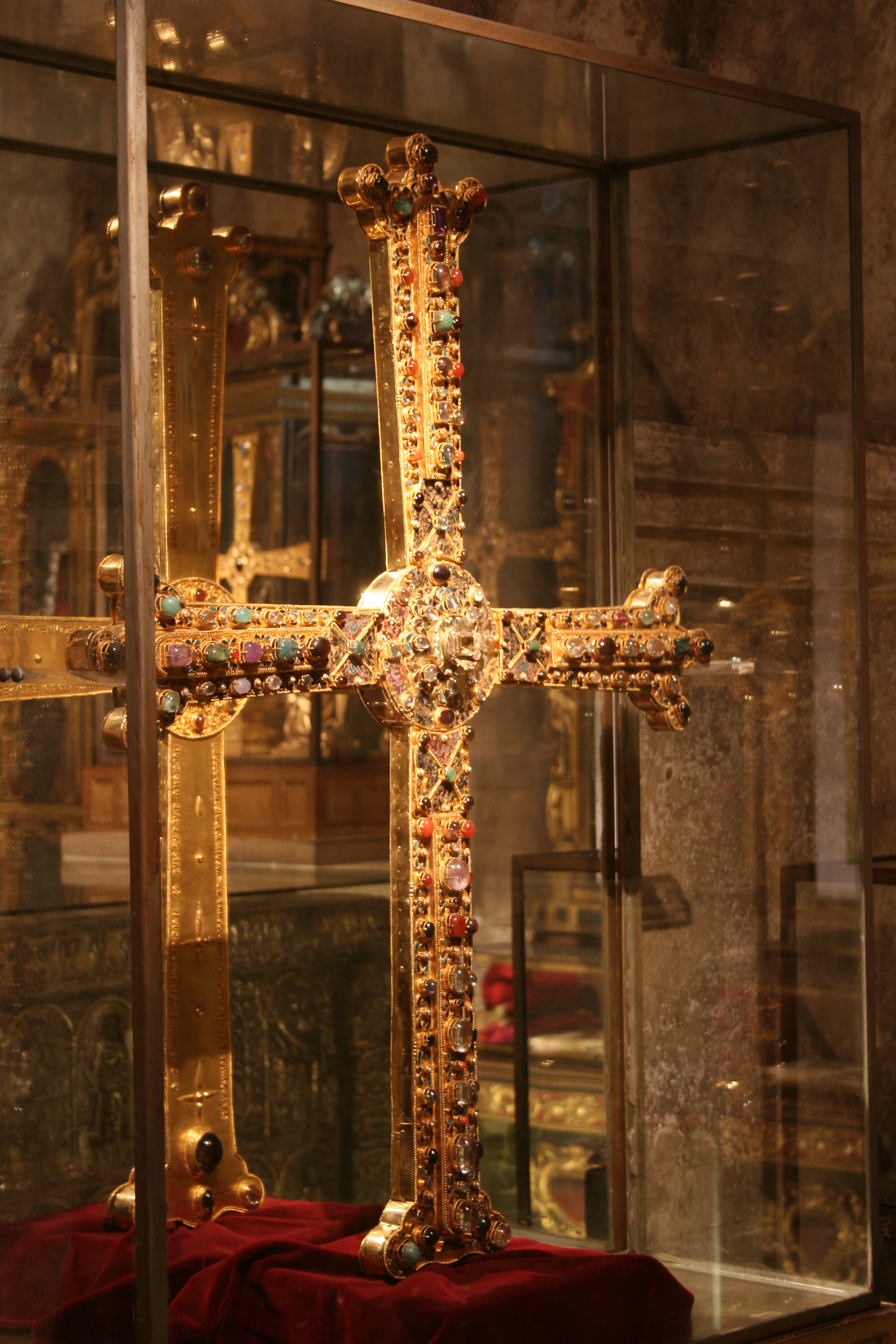
Display of the Cross in the Cámara Santa of Oviedo

The coat of arms of Asturias is the official heraldic emblem of the Principality of Asturias. It was adopted as such on 27 April 1984.

According to legend, the primitive, undecorated wooden core of this cross was carried against the Muslims of al-Andalus by King Pelagius of Asturias at the Battle of Covadonga, later kept by his son Favila of Asturias in the Church of Santa Cruz de Cangas de Onís, erected by Favila and his wife Froiluba in 737, and dedicated to the True Cross in Cangas de Onís, the first capital of the Kingdom of Asturias.

However, a 2010 study has radiocarbon dated the cross to the late 9th century, roughly contemporary to the ornate casing.

The ornate casing contains 152 gems and imitation gems. An inscription tells us that this casing was made at the Castle of Gauzón in Asturias in 908. Alfonso III donated this important Pre-Romanesque gold artifact to Cathedral of Oviedo to commemorate a hundred years of the Asturian kingdom's victories and conquests.

During the 1936–39 Spanish Civil War the Cross, like the rest of the artifacts in the Cámara Sancta, suffered serious damages which required its restoration. The Victoria Cross recovered its gems from 1942 on, thanks to popular donations for the acquisition and restoration of the relic. However, the work of goldsmiths Horacio Rivero Alvarez and Luis Aguilar did not consider the original design, altering the position of the medallion on both fronts. In 1971 new enamels were placed by German goldsmith Werner Henneberger, but here again the original design was not taken sufficiently into account.

On 9 August 1977, the Cross, together with Agate box and the Cross of the Angels, were stolen and suffered serious damage after the thieves tore their precious stones and gold plating. Its current appearance is the result of careful reconstruction carried out in 1978.

== Description ==
The Latin cross is 92 by 72 centimetres (36 in × 28 in). The core is made of two 2.5 centimetres (0.98 in) thick pieces of oak with circular ends finished in three foils, and joined in the centre by a circular disk. The whole cross is covered with gold leaf and filigree, and richly decorated especially the anverse, covered with coloured enamel, pearls, precious stones and gold thread. The reverse shows an inscription in soldered gold letters, mentioning the donors to the Church of San Salvador, King Alfonso II and Queen Jimena of Pamplona, and the place (Gauzón Castle) and the year it was made:

Svsceptvm Placide Maneat Hoc In Honore Di Qvod Offervnt
Famvli Xpi Adefonsvs Princes Et Scemena Regina
Qvisqvis Avferre Hoc Donaria Nostra Presvmserit
Fvlmine Divino Intereat Ipse Hoc Opvs Perfectvm Et Concessvm Est
Santo Salvatori Ovetense Sedis
Hoc Signo Tvetvr Pivs Hos Signo Vincitvr Inimicvs
Et Operatvm Es In Castello Gavzon Anno Regni Nsi XLII
Discvrrente Era DCCCLXVI A
