= San Julián de los Prados =

Church of San Julián de los Prados
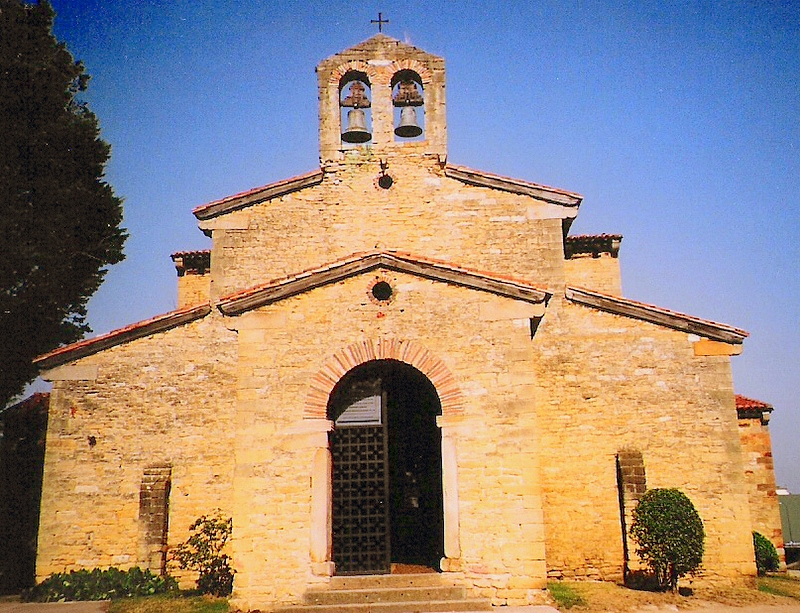
- Facade of the church of San Julián de los Prados

Religion
- Affiliation: Roman Catholic
- Ecclesiastical or organisational status: Church
- Year consecrated: 9th century

Location
- Location: Oviedo (Asturias), Spain
- Interactive map of Church of San Julián de los Prados
- Coordinates: 43°22′3.7″N 5°50′14.1″W

Architecture
- Architect: Tioda
- Type: Church
- Style: Pre-Romanesque

Specifications
- Direction of façade: SE
- Length: 30 metres (98 ft)
- Width: 25 metres (82 ft)
- UNESCO World Heritage Site
- Type: Cultural
- Criteria: ii, iv, vi
- Designated: 1985 (9th session)
- Parent listing: Monuments of Oviedo and the Kingdom of the Asturias
- Reference no.: 312-005
- Region: Europe and North America

San Julián de los Prados, also known as Santullano, is a Pre-Ramirense church from the beginning of the 9th century in Oviedo, the capital city of the Principality of Asturias, Spain. It is one of the greatest works of Asturian art and was declared an Historical-Artistic Monument by the Spanish Ministry of Culture in June 1917 and a World Heritage Site by UNESCO on 2 December 1998.

The church's construction was ordered by Alfonso II of Asturias and it was built by the court architect Tioda c. 830. It is dedicated to the martyred Egyptian saints Julian and Basilissa.

== Architecture ==
The spacious church clearly displays the characteristics of its style. It is of basilica plan with a nave and two aisles separated by square piers which support semi-circular arches and with a transept of impressive height. The iconostasis, that separates the sanctuary from the rest of the church is remarkably similar in appearance to a triumphal arch. The size and originality of the church stands out and distinguishes it from works of Visigothic art. However, without doubt, that which most attracts attention to this church is the pictorial decoration, with aniconic frescoes (stucco, very well executed), painted in three layers, with architectural decoration that bears clear Roman influences. Although it appears more a monastic rather than a royal church, a gallery was reserved for the king in the transept.

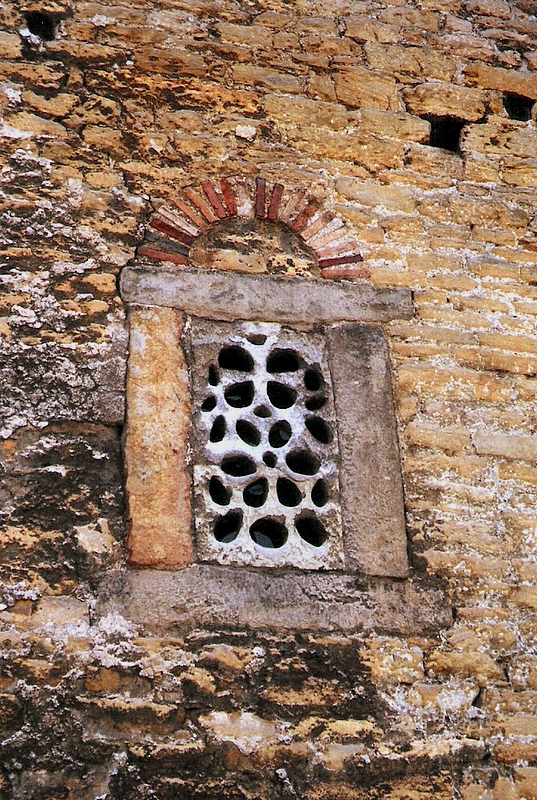
Original window.

Of the three original entrances to the church, two have been filled in.

== Decoration ==
=== Sculptural ===
The only sculptural decoration that has survived to the present day is that of the marble capitals on which rest the semi-circular arches. There are also two marble flagstones with hexagonal geometric figures and floral motives that are found in the central chapel.

=== Pictorial ===
The pictorial decoration is the most important element that can be seen in the church. It is without doubt the most important of its time, in its extent and conservation as much as in the variety of designs represented, in all of Western Europe.

== See also ==
- Asturian architecture
- Catholic Church in Spain
- Spanish architecture

== Gallery ==
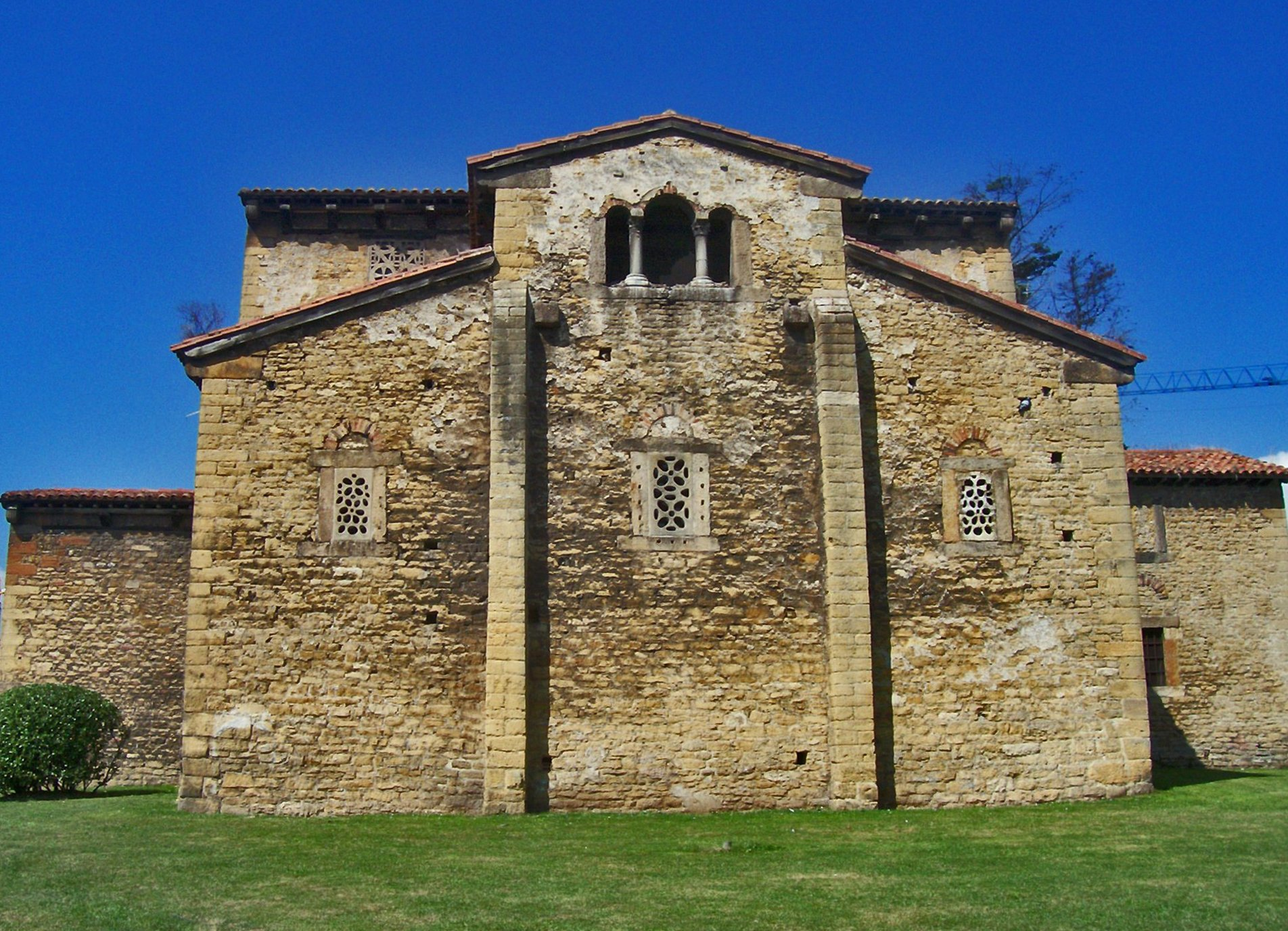
Exterior of the church

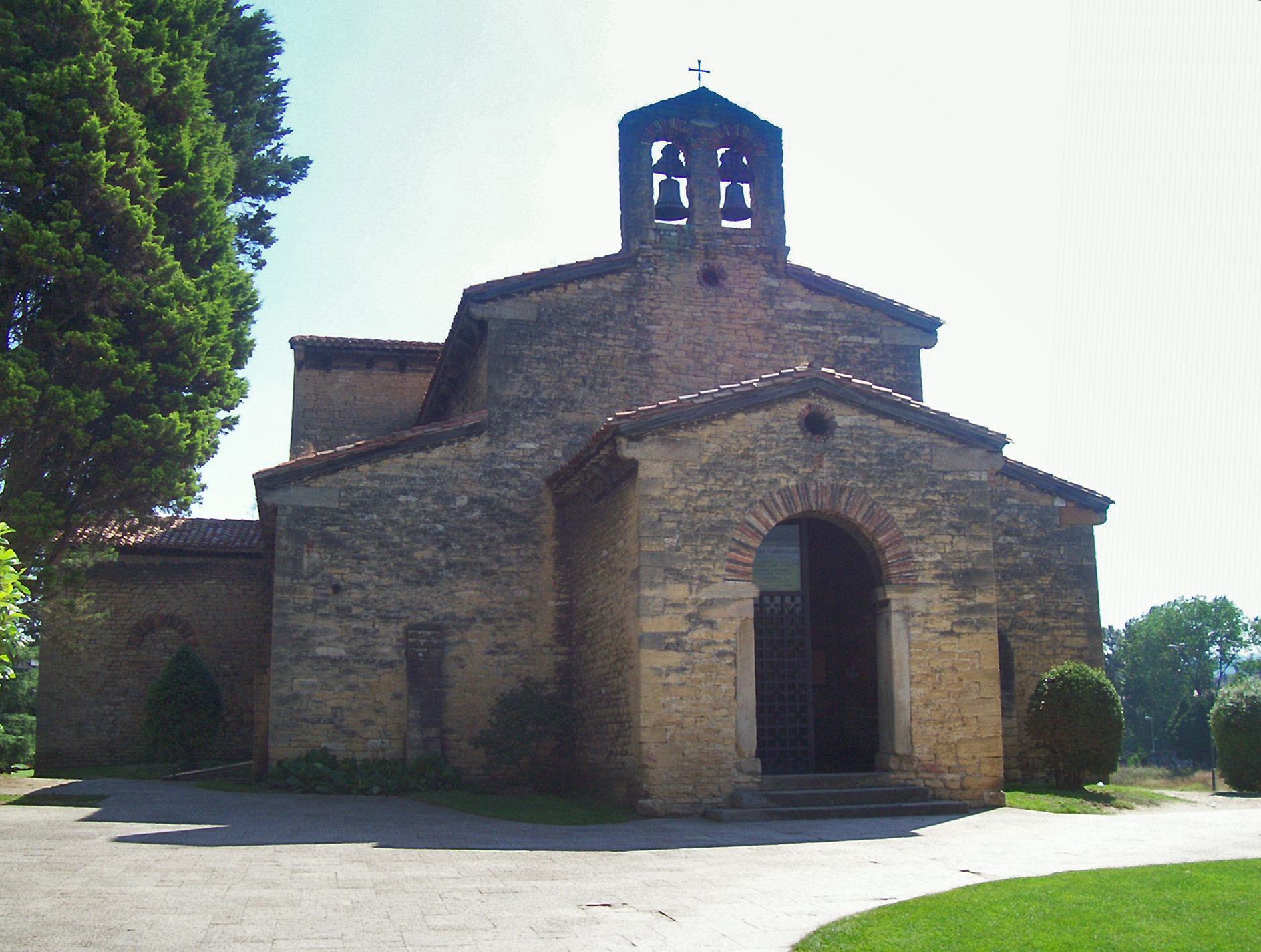
Entrance

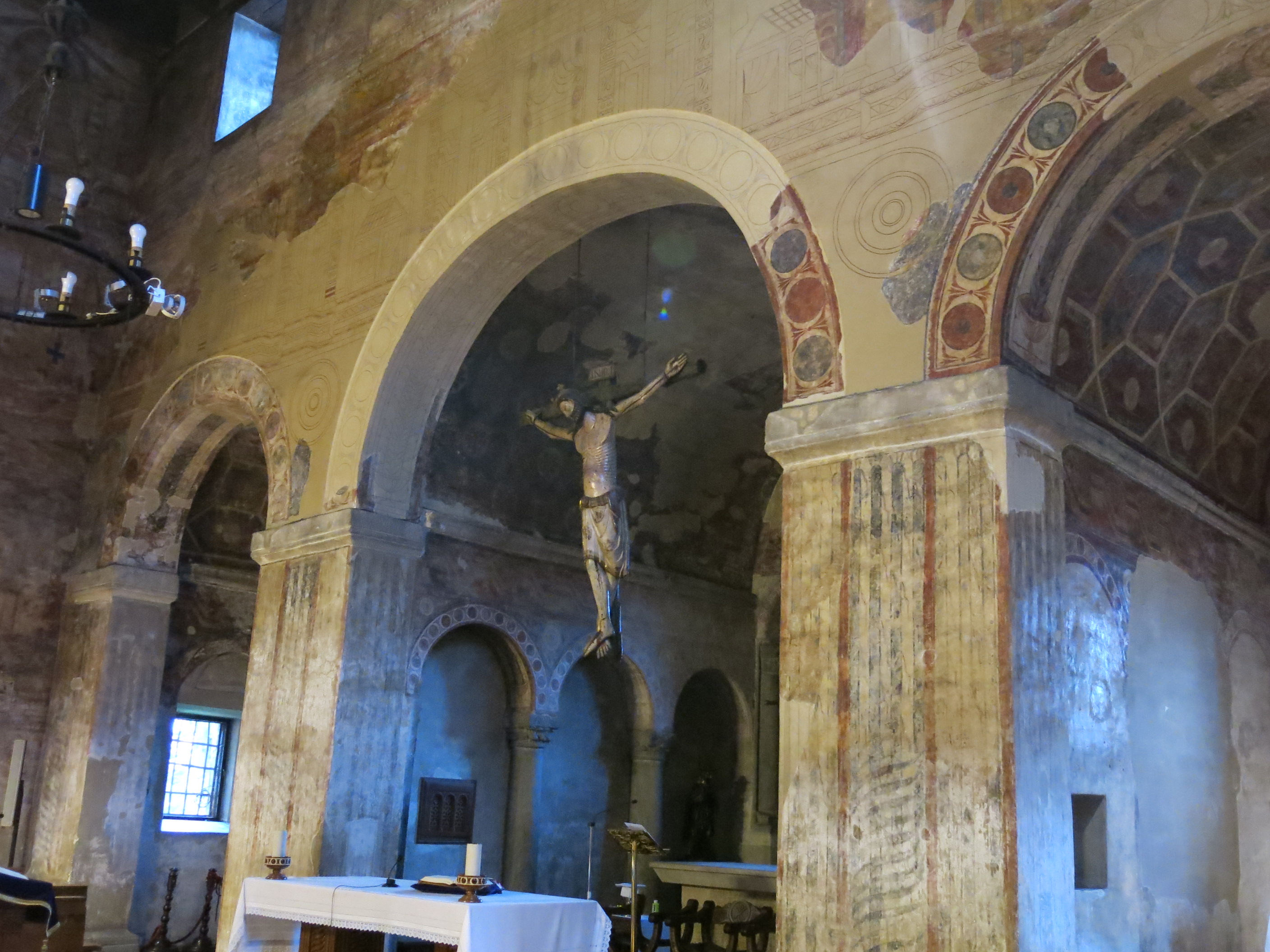
Interior

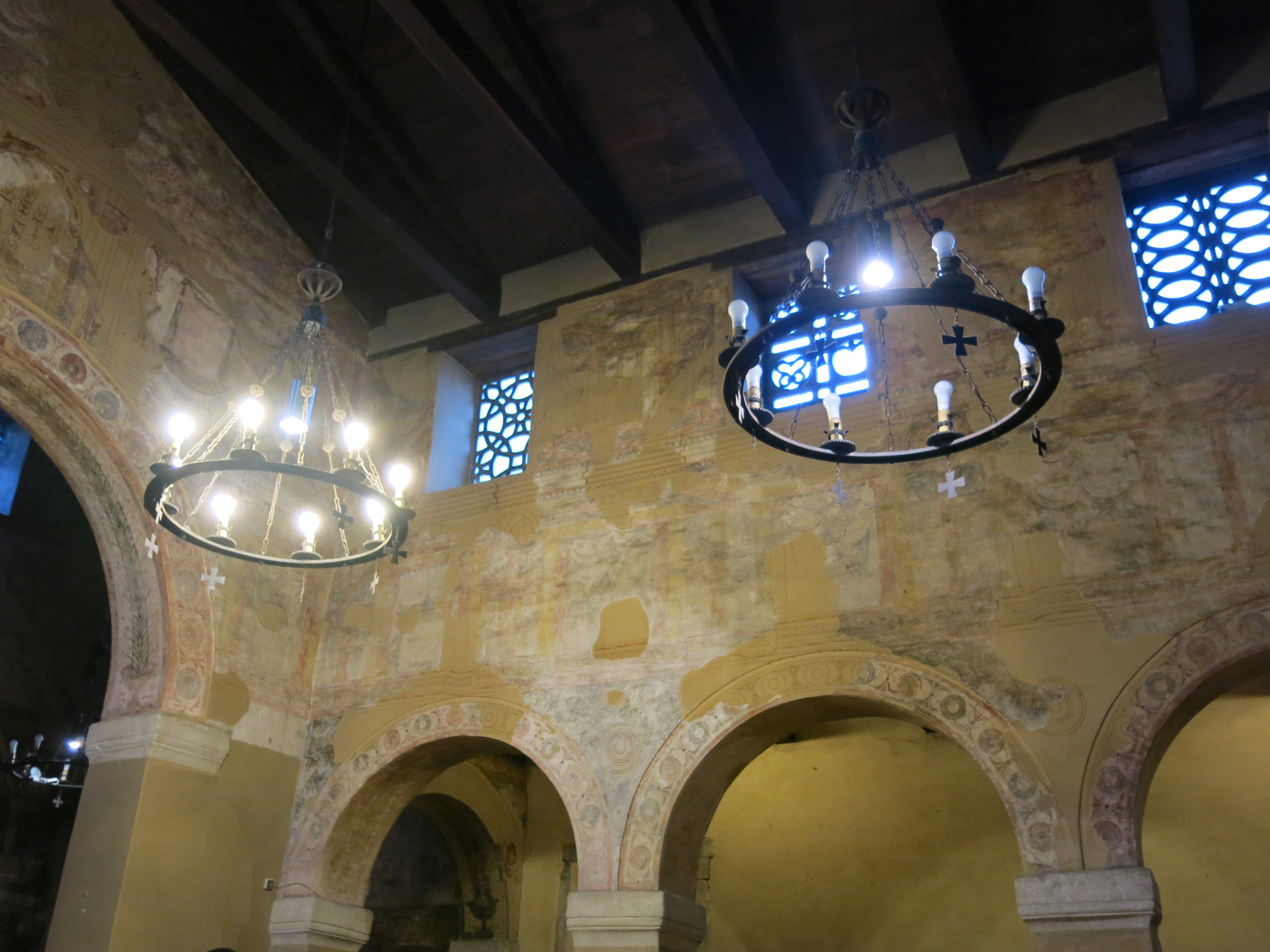
Interior with mural paintings

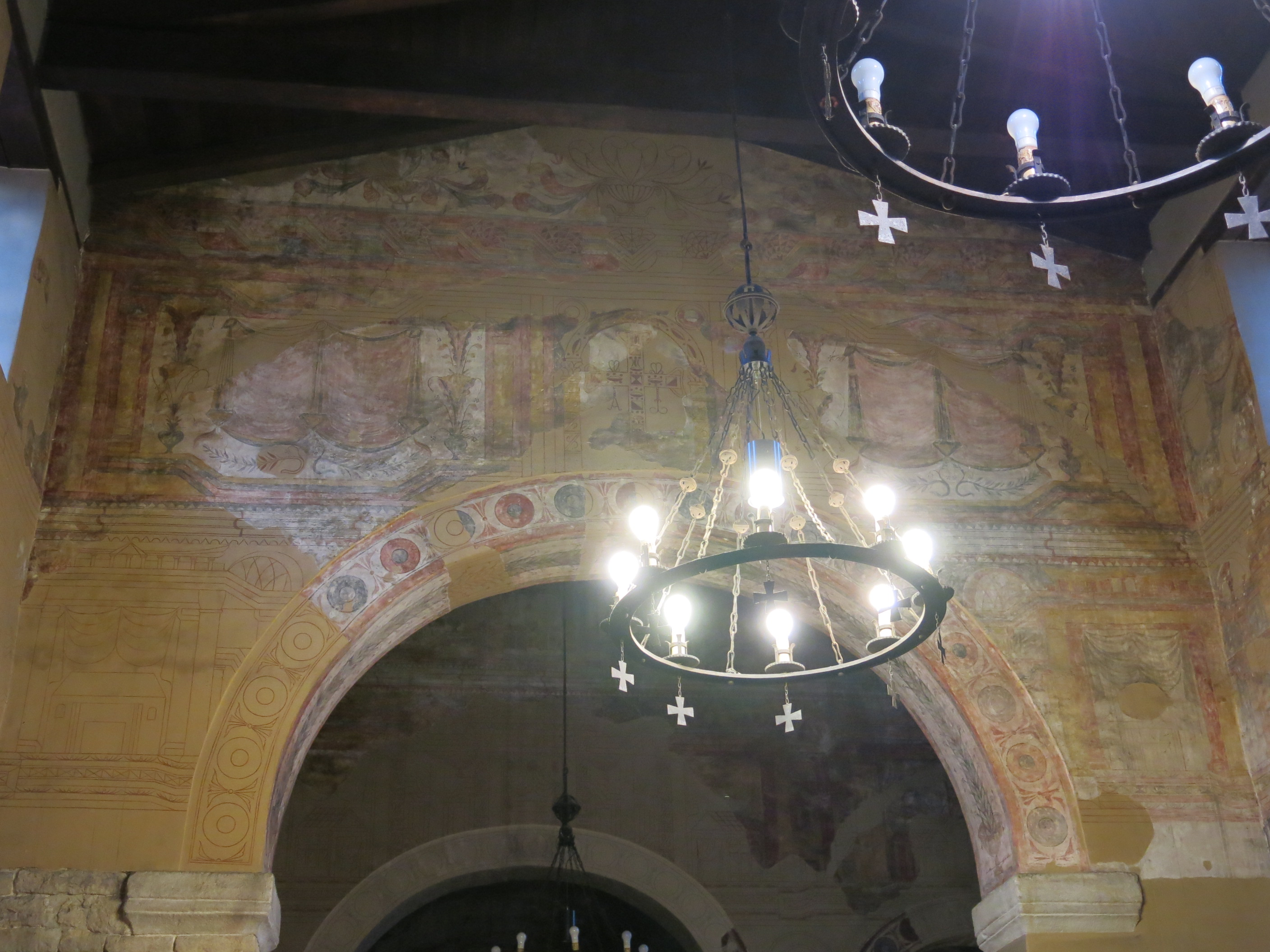
Interior with mural paintings
