= November 27 (Eastern Orthodox liturgics) =

Day in the Eastern Orthodox liturgical calendar

Eastern Orthodox liturgical calendar
November 26	November 27	November 28
November 27 O.S. ≍ December 10 N.S. November 27 N.S ≍ November 14 O.S.

An Eastern Orthodox cross

November 27 in Eastern Orthodox liturgical calendars is a feast day and a day of commemoration of saints and martyrs. Although some Orthodox churches use the Revised Julian Calendar and others use the traditional Julian calendar, the fixed commemorations for their respective November 27 are broadly the same, no matter which calendar is used. (Note: Despite the dates being the same, the days to which they refer typically differ by 13 days. The notation Old Style or O.S. is sometimes used to indicate a date in the traditional Julian Calendar (the "Old Calendar"). The notation New Style or N.S. indicates a date in the Revised Julian calendar (the "New Calendar").)

== Saints ==
- Venerable Moses (Note: He is not recorded in Synaxarion of St. Nicodemus or in the published Menaia. However he is referenced in Parisian Codex 1621, which notes that he came from a place called Fara. He became a monk at a young age and lived ascetically for 85 years in a cave on top of a mountain, with austere fasting and prayer. He reposed in peace.)
- 17 Monk-martyrs in India (4th century) (see also: November 19 - Saints Barlaam and Josaphat)
- Venerable Pinuphrius of Egypt (4th century)
- Great-Martyr James Intercisus the Persian (421) (Note: "In Persia, St. James Intercisus, a distinguished martyr. In the time of Theodosius the Younger, he denied Christ to please king Isdegerdes, but his mother and his wife having for that reason withdrawn from his company, he entered into himself, and returned to the king to declare his faith in our Lord, whereupon the irritated monarch condemned him to be cut to pieces and beheaded. Countless other martyrs suffered at this time in the same country.")
- Saint Palladius of Galatia, Bishop of Helenopolis (Elenopolis), Bithynia, author of the Lausaic History (c. 430)
- Venerable Romanus the Wonderworker of Cilicia (5th century) (Note: The Holy Monk Romanos was born in the city of Rosa and asceticised in the outskirts of Antioch, acquiring the graced gifts of perspicacity and healing. Through his prayer, the Lord granted many a childless woman the joy of motherhood. Saint Romanos was strict at fasting, and beneath his hairshirt he wore heavy chains. The saint spent many years as an hermit, without lighting up a fire. Having attained to old age, he in peace expired to the Lord.) (see also: February 9)
- Venerable Nathaniel of Nitria (6th century)
- Venerable Palladius of Thessalonica (6th–7th century)

== Pre-Schism Western saints ==
- Saints Facundus and Primitivus (c. 300) (Note: Born in Léon in Spain, he was beheaded near the River Cea where Sahagun now stands. Later the monastery of Sahagun, around which the present town grew up, was named after St Facundus.) (Note: "In Galicia, on the river Caea, the Saints Facundus and Primitivus, who suffered under the governor Atticus.")
- Saint Valerian, Bishop of Aquileia in the north of Italy (389) (Note: He succeeded an Arian bishop and he spent his energy fighting that heresy.)
- Saint John Angeloptes, Bishop of Ravenna in Italy 430-433 (433) (Note: The Greek name Angeloptes means 'the man who saw an angel'. It was given to him because an angel, visible to him alone, came and helped him serve the divine liturgy.)
- Saint Seachnall (Sechnall), first Bishop of Dunsauglin in Meath in Ireland and later served in Armagh (457) (Note: A disciple of St Patrick. In 433 he became the first Bishop of Dunsauglin in Meath in Ireland and later served in Armagh. He wrote the earliest poem of the Irish Church - an alphabetical hymn in honour of St Patrick.)
- Saint Maximus of Riez, Abbot of Lérins Abbey in France in 426, he became Bishop of Riez (460) (Note: He became Bishop of Riez much against his will in 434, and was consecrated by St Hilary. He was one of the most prominent bishops in the Church of Gaul at that time.) (Note: "At Riez, in France, St. Maximus, bishop and confessor, who, from his tender years, was endowed with every grace and virtue. Being first superior of the monastery of Lerins, and afterwards bishop of the church of Riez, he was celebrated for the working of miracles and prodigies.")
- Saint Congar of Congresbury, Bishop of Somerset (520)
- Saint Siffred of Carpentras (Siffrein, Syffroy, Suffredus), a monk at Lérins Abbey and later Bishop of Carpentras in the south of France (c. 540)
- Saint Severinus, a hermit who lived near Paris in France (c. 540) (Note: "At Paris, the departure from this world of St. Severin, monk and solitary.")
- Saint Gallgo, founder of Llanallgo in Anglesey in Wales (6th century)
- Saint Acharius, Bishop of Noyon-Tournai in Belgium (640) (Note: A monk at Luxeuil in France under St Eustace. In 621 he was chosen Bishop of Noyon-Tournai in Belgium and encouraged the work of St Amandus of Maastricht. Acarius had great influence on the spreading of Christianity in Belgic Gaul.)
- Saint Bilihildis, foundress of the convent of Altenmünster in Mainz (c. 710)
- Saint Fergus of Glamis, born in Ireland, he was a bishop who preached among the Picts in Perthshire, Caithness, Buchan and Forfarshire in Scotland (c. 721)
- Saint Virgil (Vergilius, Fergal), Abbot of St Peter's in Salzburg and Bishop, the Apostle of Carinthia (784) (Note: "At Salzburg, in Austria, St. Virgilius, bishop, and apostle of Carinthia.")
- Saint Apollinaris, fourteenth Abbot of Montecassino Abbey in Italy, abbot for eleven years (828)

== Post-Schism Orthodox saints ==
- Venerable Theodosius of Tarnovo (1363) (see also: February 17)
- Saint James, Bishop and Wonderworker of Rostov (1392) (Note: See: (in Russian) Иаков (епископ Ростовский). Википедии. (Russian Wikipedia).)
- Saint Damaskinos the Studite, Bishop of Liti and Rendini (1577) (Note: On November 27, 2013 the Sacred Metropolis of Lagada, Liti and Rendini ((in Greek) Ιερά Μητρόπολις Λαγκαδά, Λητής και Ρεντίνης) organized the canonization of Saints Akakios and Damaskinos the Studite, who were both Bishops of Liti and Rendini in the 15th and 16th centuries. The feast of Saint Akakios will be celebrated on August 16th and Saint Damaskinos will be celebrated on November 27th. Metropolitan John of Lagada, Liti and Rendini submitted the names of these newly-glorified Saints to be included in the Synaxarion of the Orthodox Church, and with the approval of the Ecumenical Patriarchate this took place in the Sacred Church of Saint Athanasios in Liti. The Ecumenical Patriarchate and the Church of Greece were represented by Metropolitan Anthimos of Thessaloniki during the Hierarchical Divine Liturgy, who was among many hierarchs, priests, monks, government officials and faithful celebrating the first feast of Saint Damaskinos the Studite.) (Note: See: (in Greek) Δαμασκηνός Στουδίτης. Βικιπαίδεια (Greek Wikipedia).)
- Venerable Diodorus, Abbot of Yuriev Monastery (George Hill), Solovki (1633) (see also: August 16)
- Blessed Andrei (Andrew) Ogorodnikov of Simbirsk, Fool-for-Christ (1841)

=== New martyrs and confessors ===
- New Hieromartyr Nicholas Dobronravov, Archbishop of Vladimir (1937) (Note: See: (in Russian) Николай (Добронравов). Википедии. (Russian Wikipedia).)
- New Hieromartyrs Nicholas Andreyev, Boris Ivanosky and Basil Sokolov of Moscow, Protopresbyters (1937)
- New Hieromartyrs Theodore Dorofiev of Moscow, Alexei Speransky of Moscow, John Glazkov of Alma-Ata, Sergius Amanov, John Khrustalev, Sergius Brednikov, Nicholas Pokrovsky, Priests (1937)
- New Hieromartyr Cronides Lyubimov of Holy Trinity-St. Sergius Lavra, Archimandrite, (Note: See: (in Russian) Кронид (Любимов). Википедии. (Russian Wikipedia).) and with him Seraphim Krestianinov, Abbot, and Xenophont Bondarenko, Hieromonk, all of St. Sergius Lavra (1937)
- New Hieromartyrs Joasaph (Ioasaf) Boyev, Archimandrite of Nikolskoye Monastery, Moscow; (Note: See: (in Russian) Иоасаф (Боев). Википедии. (Russian Wikipedia).) and Nicholas (Nikolay) Saltykov, Hieromonk of the St. Nicholas-Peshnosha Monastery, Moscow (1937)
- New Hieromartyrs Alexei Gavrin; (Note: See: (in Russian) Алексий (Гаврин). Википедии. (Russian Wikipedia).) Apollos Fedoseyev, Hieromonk of Moscow; and Nikon Belyaev, Archimandrite of the Staro-Golutvin Monastery, Kolomna (1937)
- New Martyr John Emelyanov (1937)

== Other commemorations ==
- Uncovering of the relics (1192) of St. Vsevolod (Gabriel) of Pskov (1138)
- Synaxis of the New Martyrs and Confessors of Radonezh. (Note: See: (in Russian) Собор новомучеников и исповедников Радонежских. Википедии. (Russian Wikipedia).)
- Repose of Hieromonk Athanasius of Iveron Monastery, Mt. Athos (1973)

=== Icons ===
- Icon of the Most Holy Theotokos "of the Sign" at Novgorod (1170)
- Icon of the Most Holy Theotokos "Kursk Root" (1295) (see also: September 8)
- Icon of the Most Holy Theotokos "of Abalek" in Siberia (1637) (Note: Patronal icon of the Metropolitans of Tobolsk. The Abalaka Icon “Of the Sign” is also commemorated on July 20.) (Note: See: (in Russian) Абалакская икона Божией Матери. Википедии. (Russian Wikipedia).)
- Icon of the Mother of God of Tsarskoe Selo (1753)
- Icon of the Mother of God "Zlatoustovskaya" (1848) (see also: March 3)
- Icon of the Mother of God "Seraphim-Ponetaevka" (1879)

== Icon gallery ==
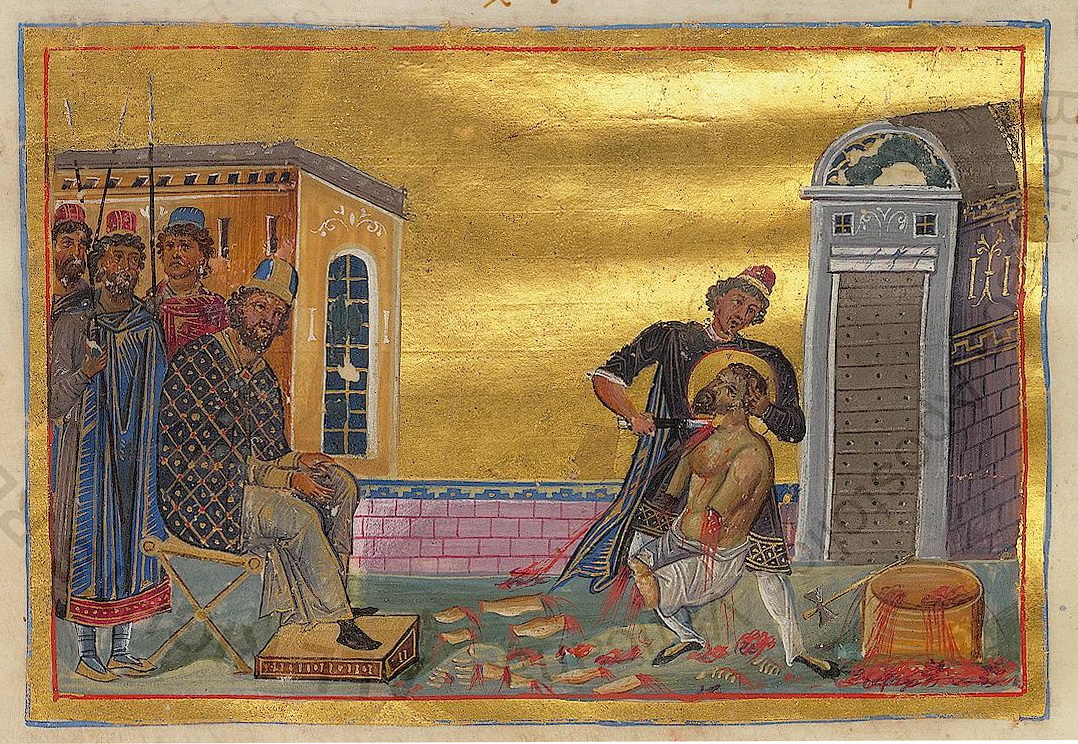
Great-Martyr James of Persia.
(Menologion of Basil II, 10th century).

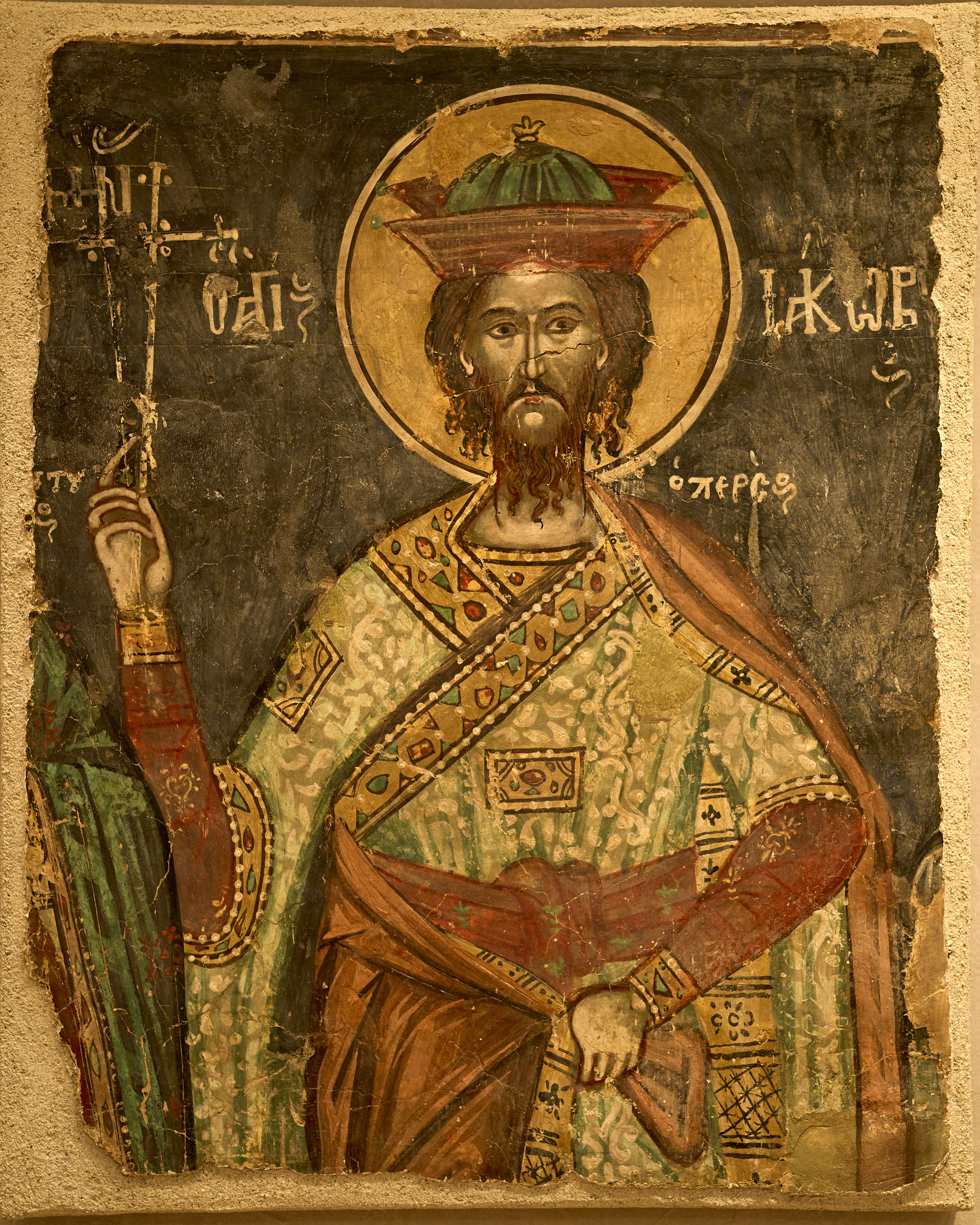
Great-Martyr James of Persia.
(Byzantine and Christian Museum of Athens).

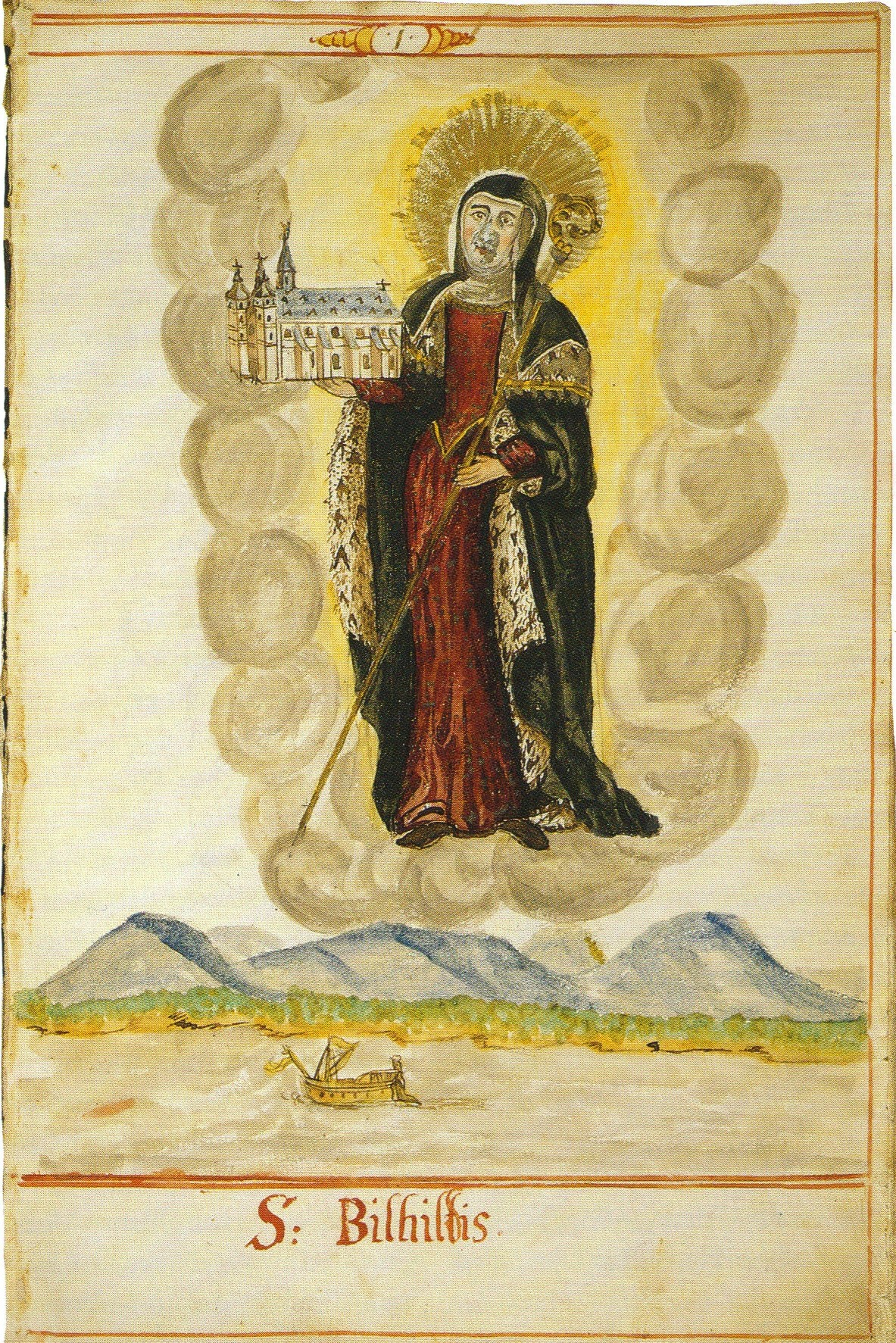
Saint Bilihildis of Altmünster.

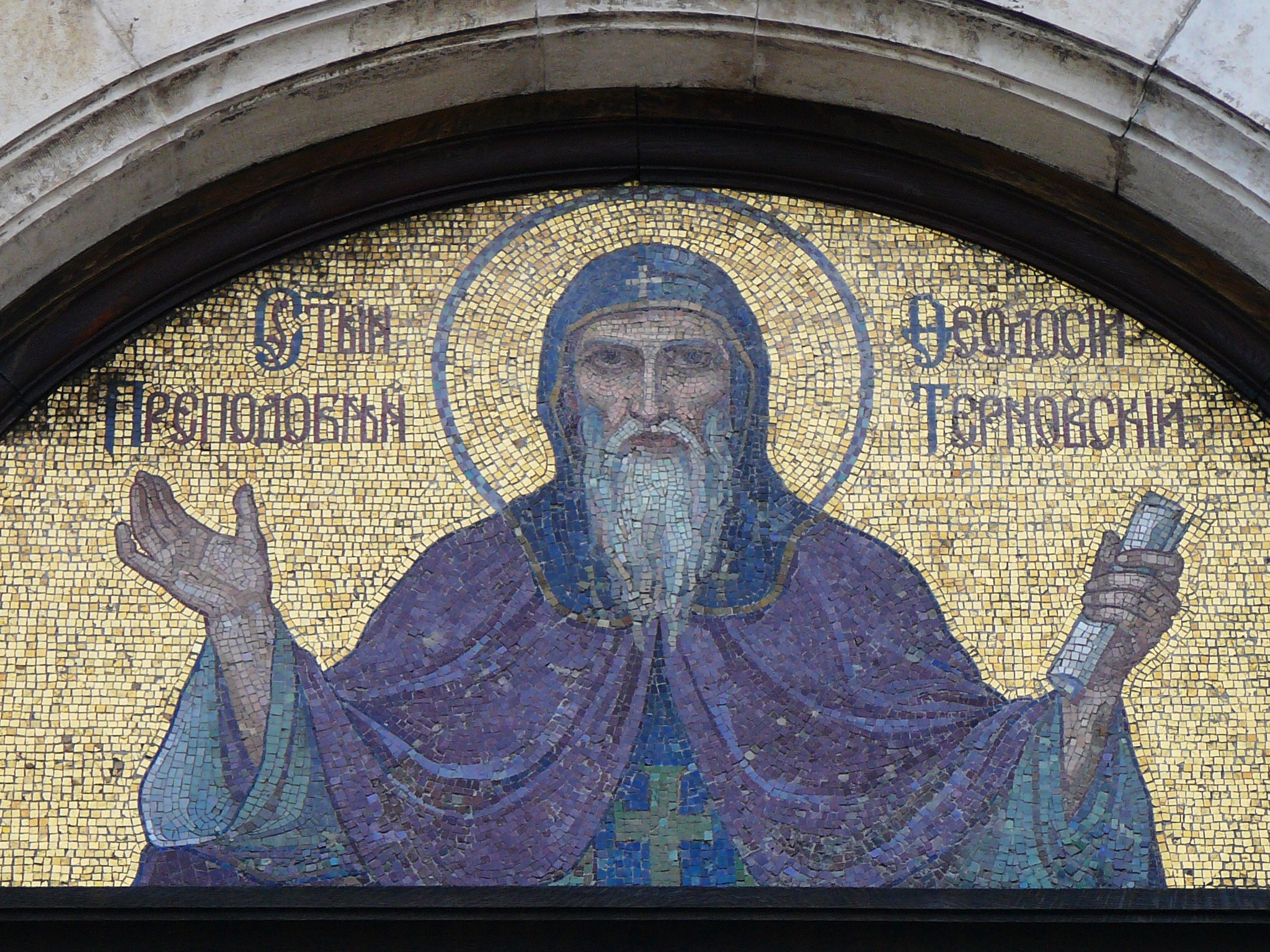
Fresco of Theodosius of Tarnovo, at Saint Alexander Nevsky Cathedral, Sofia.

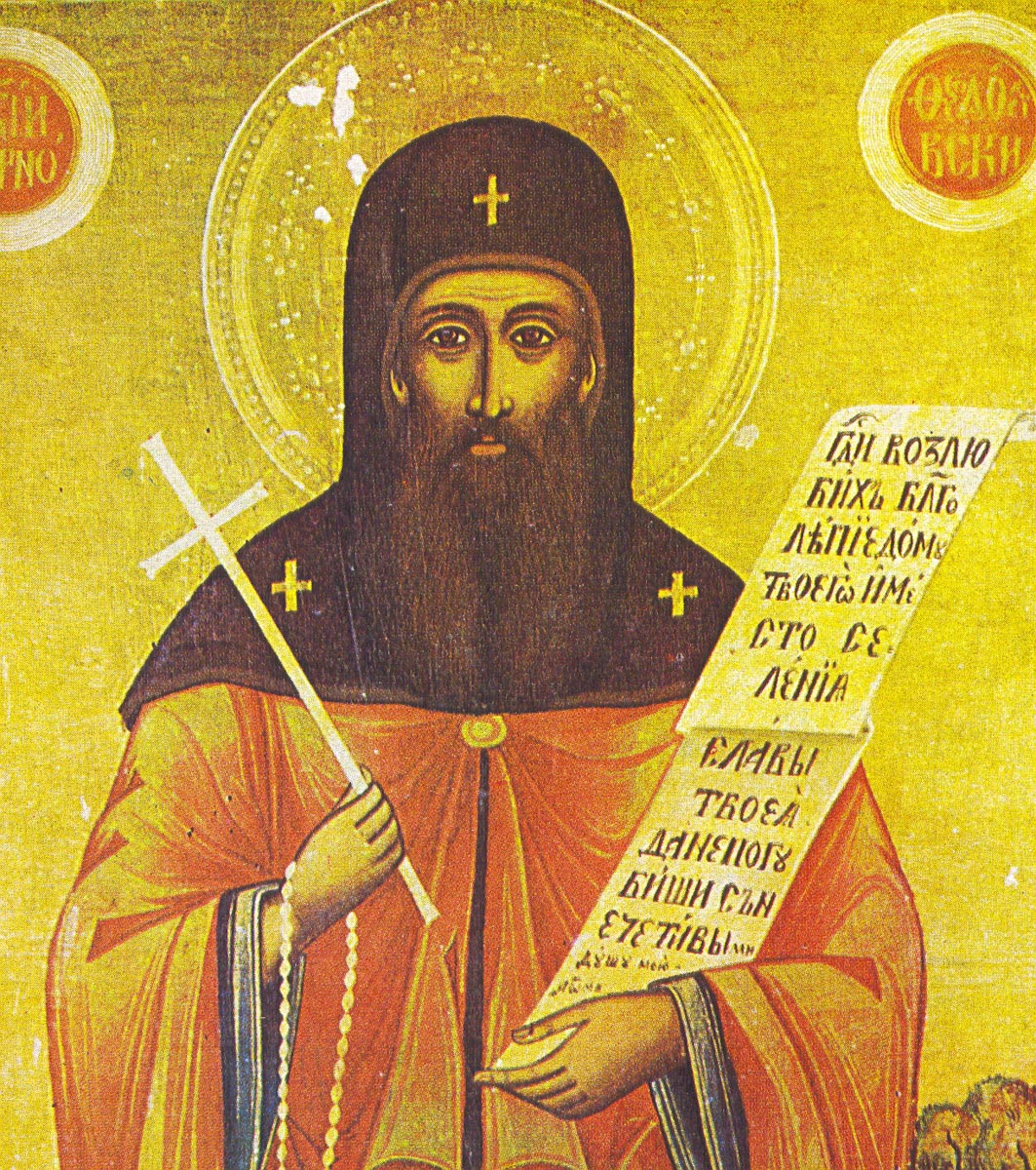
St. Theodosius of Tarnovo.

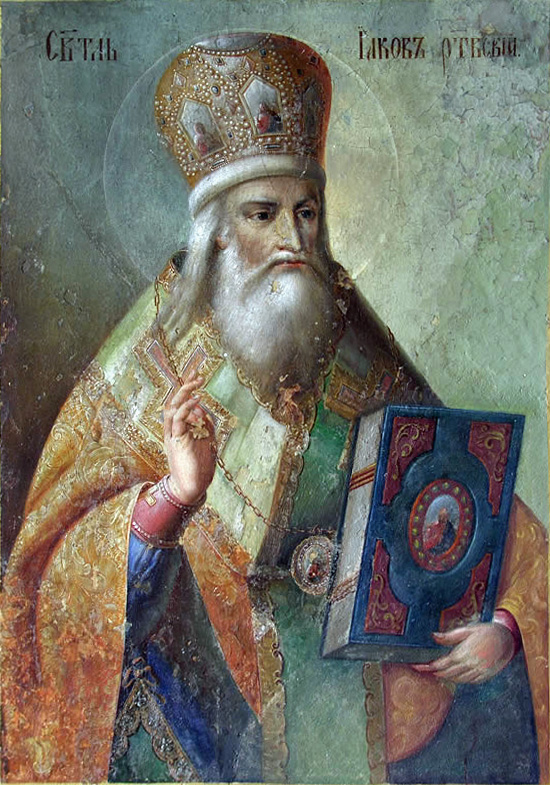
St. James, Bishop and Wonderworker of Rostov.

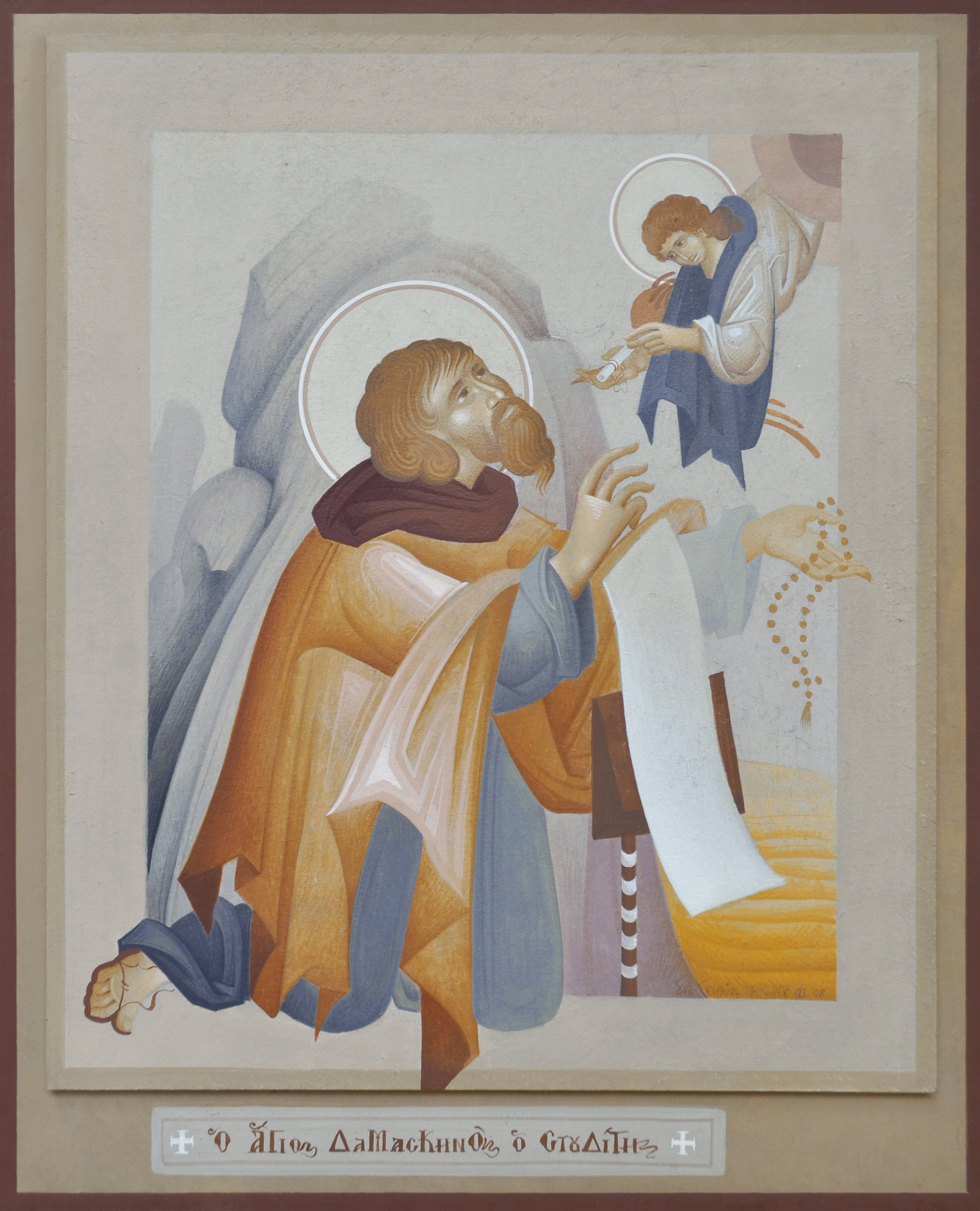
St. Damaskinos the Studite, Bishop of Liti and Rendini.

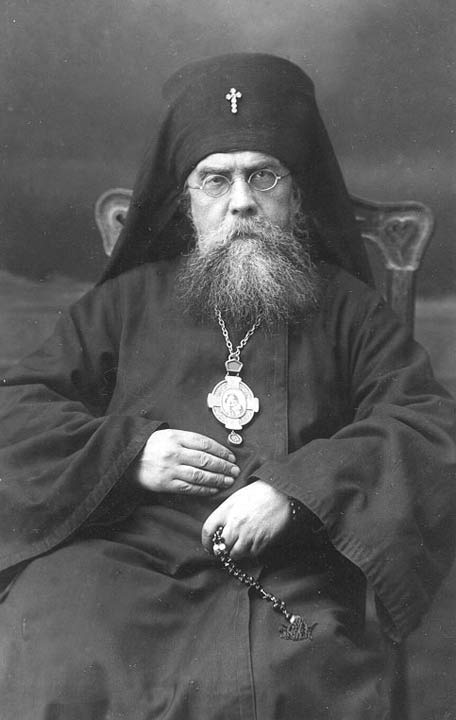
New Hieromartyr Nicholas (Dobronravov), Archbishop of Vladimir and Suzdal.

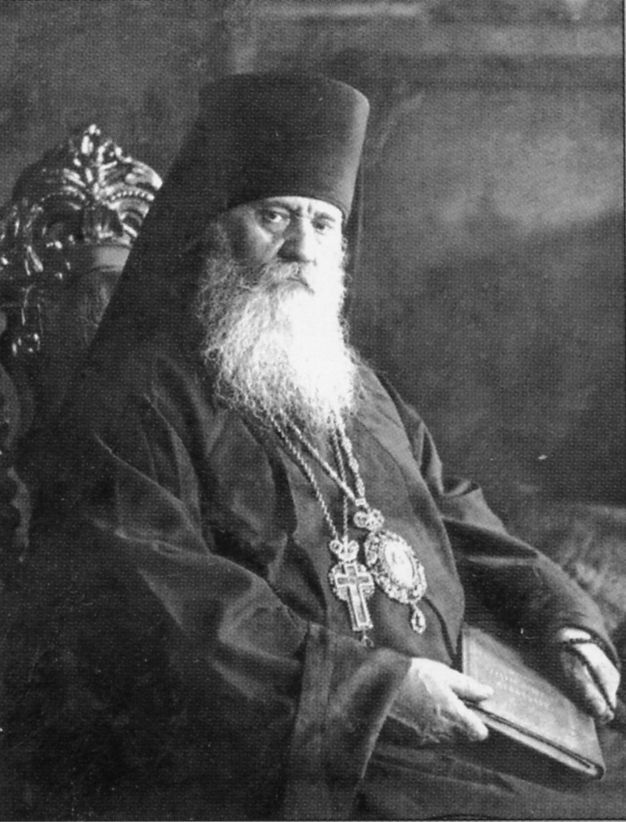
New Hieromartyr Archimandrite Cronides of Holy Trinity-St. Sergius Lavra.

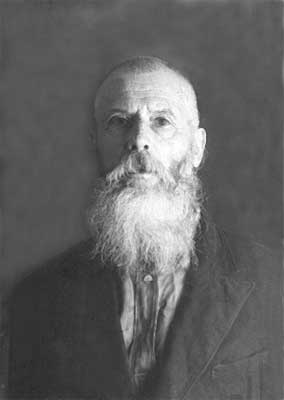
New Hieromartyr Joasaph (Boyev), Archimandrite.

New Hieromartyr Alexei Gavrin, monk.

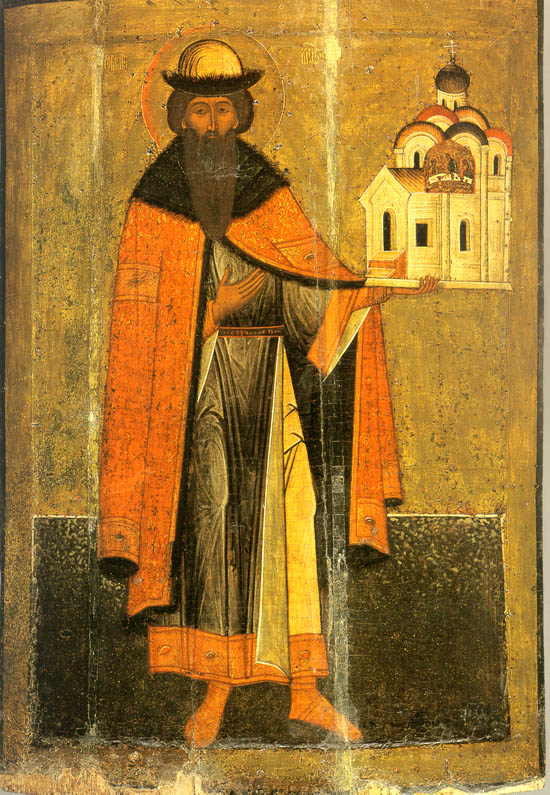
St. Vsevolod (Gabriel) of Pskov, holding the Pskov cathedral in his hand.

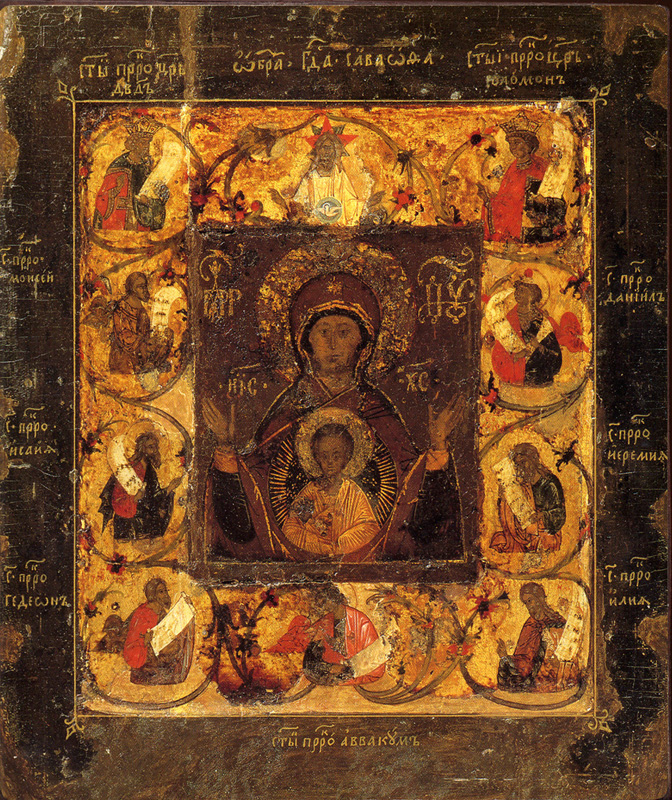
"Kursk Root" Icon of the Mother of God.

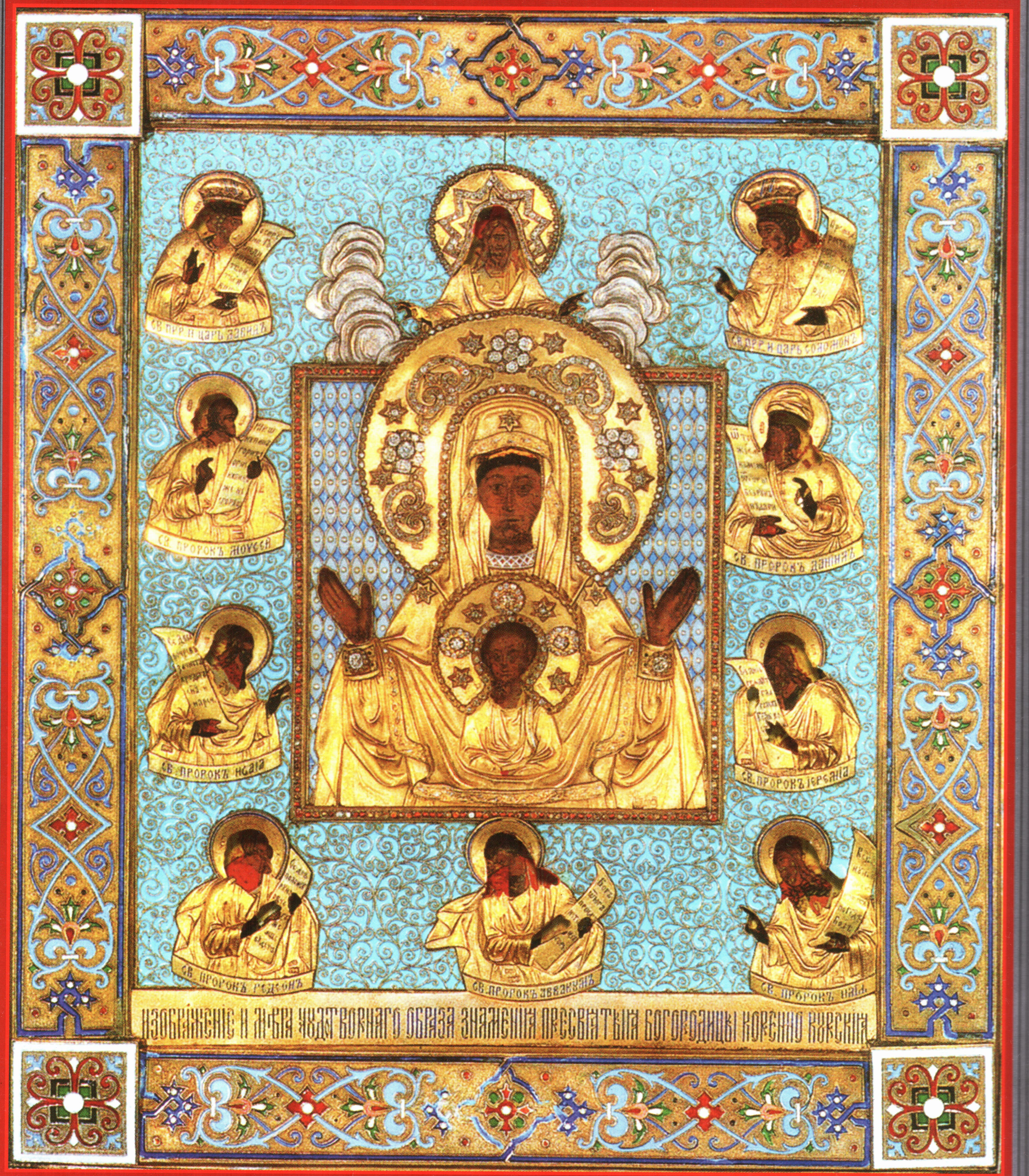
"Kursk Root" Icon of the Mother of God.

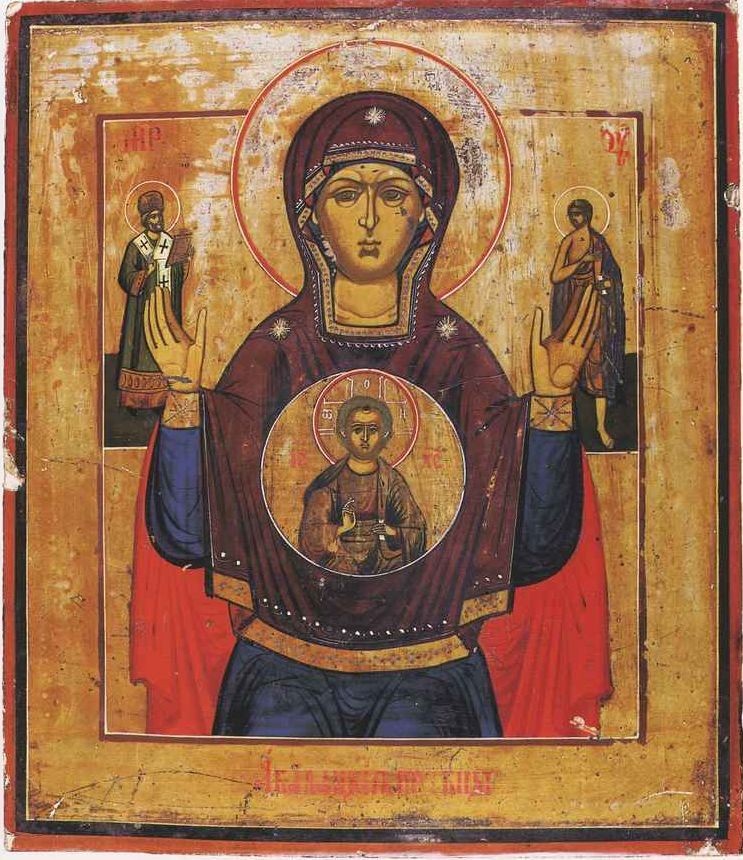
Icon of the Most Holy Theotokos "of Abalek" in Siberia.

== Sources ==
- November 27 / December 10. Orthodox Calendar (PRAVOSLAVIE.RU).
- December 10 / November 27. Holy Trinity Russian Orthodox Church (A parish of the Patriarchate of Moscow).
- November 27. OCA - The Lives of the Saints.
- The Autonomous Orthodox Metropolia of Western Europe and the Americas (ROCOR). St. Hilarion Calendar of Saints for the year of our Lord 2004. St. Hilarion Press (Austin, TX). p. 89.
- The Twenty-Seventh Day of the Month of November. Orthodoxy in China.
- November 27. Latin Saints of the Orthodox Patriarchate of Rome.
- The Roman Martyrology. Transl. by the Archbishop of Baltimore. Last Edition, According to the Copy Printed at Rome in 1914. Revised Edition, with the Imprimatur of His Eminence Cardinal Gibbons. Baltimore: John Murphy Company, 1916. pp. 365–366.
- Rev. Richard Stanton. A Menology of England and Wales, or, Brief Memorials of the Ancient British and English Saints Arranged According to the Calendar, Together with the Martyrs of the 16th and 17th Centuries. London: Burns & Oates, 1892. pp. 567–568.

Greek Sources

- Great Synaxaristes: (in Greek) 27 ΝΟΕΜΒΡΙΟΥ. ΜΕΓΑΣ ΣΥΝΑΞΑΡΙΣΤΗΣ.
- (in Greek) Συναξαριστής. 27 Νοεμβρίου. ECCLESIA.GR. (H ΕΚΚΛΗΣΙΑ ΤΗΣ ΕΛΛΑΔΟΣ).
- (in Greek) November 27. Ορθόδοξος Συναξαριστής.

Russian Sources

- (in Russian) 10 декабря (27 ноября). Православная Энциклопедия под редакцией Патриарха Московского и всея Руси Кирилла (электронная версия). (Orthodox Encyclopedia - Pravenc.ru).
- (in Russian) 27 ноября по старому стилю / 10 декабря по новому стилю. Русская Православная Церковь - Православный церковный календарь на 2018 год.
