= Arca Santa =

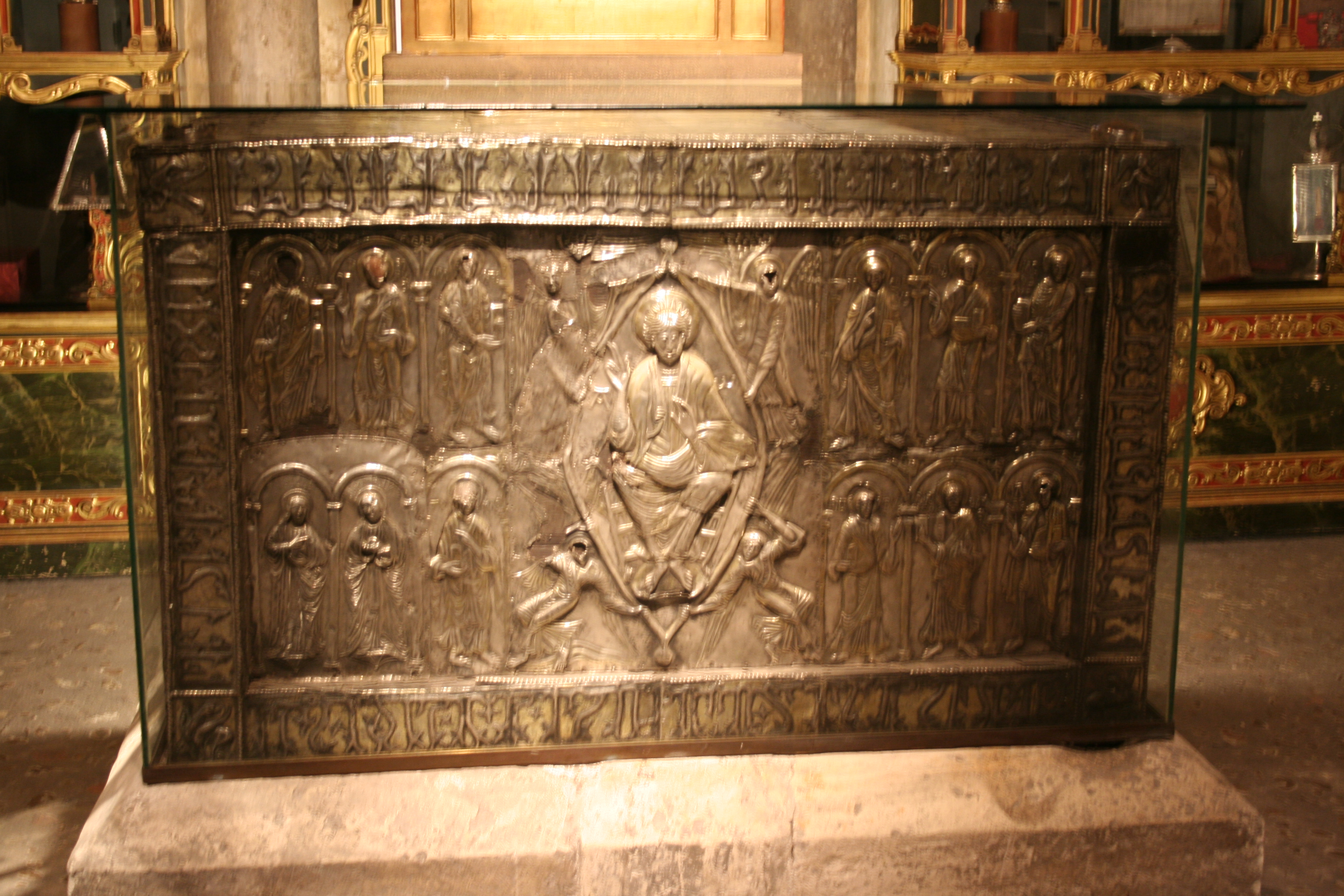
Arca Santa, the front panel

The Arca Santa ("Holy Ark", or chest) is an oak reliquary covered with silver-gilt decorated in the Romanesque style. It is kept in the Cámara Santa of the Cathedral of San Salvador in Oviedo. In 1934 the Cámara Santa suffered an explosion that severely damaged the Arca, which was carefully restored by Manuel Gómez-Moreno.

== Description ==
The Arca is a black oak box 72 by 119 by 93 cm, which is unusually large for a reliquary, more typical of the size of a small portable altar. It was constructed without nails, perhaps in imitation of Solomon's Temple. The whole is covered in silver: front and both sides are repoussé, the back has a simple checkered pattern, and the flat lid is engraved with niello. Appropriately for its size, the front panel is modelled after an altar front, depicting Christ in majesty on a mandorla carried by four angels and flanked by the Twelve Apostles. The panel is bordered on all sides by a Kufesque inscription.

The left side is a narrative cycle of Christ's infancy in five scenes arranged in two registers, read counterclockwise from the top right. The two rows are separated by a band which reads: MARIA ET IOSEP POSUERUNT DOMINUM IN PRESEPIO ANIMALIU / ANGELUS APARUIT IOSEP DICENS FUGE IN EGIPTUM ET ESTO [IBI] ("Mary and Joseph put the Lord in the animals' manger / An angel appeared to Joseph saying, 'Flee into Egypt, and stay [there]"). The right side is also divided into two registers separated by a band of text. The top depicts Christ in a mandorla supported by two angels on the left and on the right Michael the Archangel, flanked by a cherub and a seraph, battling a dragon. The bottom row shows eight apostles in various poses, all apparently speaking. The band reads: ASCENDENS XPS IN ALTUM CAPTIVAM DUXIT CAPTIVITATE / MICAEL ARCANGELUS PUGNAVIT CUM DRACONE ("Ascending on high, Christ led the captive from captivity / Michael the Archangel fought with the dragon").

The lid bears a detailed portrayal of Christ's crucifixion, including the two thieves, the Virgin Mary, the "disciple whom Jesus loved" (John), angels with censers, and personifications of the sun and moon. Surrounding the scene there is a long inscription.

== Contents ==
Unusually for reliquaries of the Early Middle Ages, the Arca contained the relics of several saints. The most precious were a piece of the True Cross, pieces from the Crown of Thorns and the Holy Sepulchre, some bread from the Last Supper, and some of the Virgin's milk. There was also a crystalline ampulla containing some blood from the Berytus icon, an image of Christ first reported at the Second Council of Nicaea in 787 to have emitted blood after it had been pierced by some Jews. The reported contents of the Arca Santa "reflect interest in the humanity of Christ, the Holy Family, and the Holy Land itself". Besides relics of the Holy Family, the Old Testament was represented in the Arca by the rod of Moses and some manna. Many relics of the apostles were contained in it, as well as the cloak which the Virgin reportedly gave to Ildephonsus of Toledo.

The earliest recorded description of the Arca's contents is a notice added to an eleventh-century codex of Valenciennes This notice may have been based on a guide prepared by some clerks of the church of Oviedo. The lid of the Arca also contains a partial list of contents in silver repoussé. Another contemporary source for the contents of the Arca is a letter of Osmond, Bishop of Astorga, addressed to Ida of Boulogne, about the Marian relics one could see in Spain.

=== Sudarium of Oviedo ===
The Sudarium of Oviedo, or Shroud of Oviedo, also cloth of Oviedo, is the most notable relic of Christ's passion kept in the Arca Santa reliquary. The bloodstained cloth or sudarium (Latin for sweat cloth) is reputed to be the cloth wrapped around the head of Jesus Christ after he died, and left in the tomb folded to the side at his resurrection. There are notable congruencies with a number of related acheiropoieta images such as those of the Turin and Manoppello. The Sudarium of Oviedo is displayed to the public three times a year: Good Friday, the Feast of the Triumph of the Cross on 14 September, and its octave on 21 September.

== Origins ==
=== Legend ===
Legends concerning the origins of the Arca Santa spread widely in the Middle Ages, and can be found in no less than ten sources between the eleventh and fourteenth centuries. In the Liber testamentorum, composed around 1120 to record all the gifts and privileges received by the diocese of Oviedo, some disciples of the twelve apostles are given credit for constructing the Arca in Jerusalem, where it is said to have remained until Chosroes II conquered the city in 614. At that time it was moved to Africa. The Islamic invasion forced its removal to Toledo, at that time the capital of the Visigoths. When the Muslims invaded Spain—as a result of the Visigothic kings' sins, according to the Liber—in 711 the Arca was brought to Oviedo for safekeeping. Finally, in the early ninth century Alfonso II of Asturias constructed a chapel dedicated to Saint Michael (the Cámara Santa) to house it. In this chapel, now an annex of the cathedral of Oviedo, it remains to this day. A similar account of the translation is included in the Liber chronicorum, a historical companion piece to the Liber testamentorum. This in turn influenced accounts in the Historia silense, the Chronicon mundi, and De rebus Hispaniae. Two biographies of Toribius of Astorga, the Estoria de sancto Toribio and the Vida de santo Toribio de Liébana, though they differ on many points, agree that Toribius took refuge in Spain with some relics from Jerusalem, where he had been guarding them, safely hidden in a wooden ark. While the Estoria presents a long list of items stored away in the Arca, the Vida mentions only a piece of wood from the True Cross and a jar which held the wine of Jesus' first miracle at Cana:

E en cabo de los tres años aparescióle otra vez el ángel de Dios e díxole:
— Turibio, lleva las reliquias a las partidas de España ca sepas que toda esta tierra a de seer destruyda de moros.
E santo Turibio fizo luego assí e puso las reliquias en la barca, entre las quales traxo primeramente un pedaço de la cruz donde fue crucificado el nuestro salvador Jhesu Christo, e una tinaja de las en que consagró del agua vino e de otras muchas reliquias de santos e santas.

And at the end of the three years the angel of God appeared to him again and said to him: "Turibius, carry the relics to the parts of Spain because you know that all this land must be destroyed by the Moors." And Saint Turibius then did thus and put the relics on the ship, among which were firstly a piece of the cross where our saviour Jesus Christ was crucified, and one of the jars in which he consecrated the water wine, and many other relics of saints men and women.

=== History ===
Traditionally, historians have credited the adornment of the Arca and the Cámara to Alfonso VI of León and his sister Urraca of Zamora and dated it to 1075. On 13 March that year, according to Document 72 of the cathedral archives of Oviedo, Alfonso and Urraca had the reliquary opened in their presence and examined the contents. This document, dated 14 March, survives only in a thirteenth-century copy, and its authenticity has been questioned. It may have been produced to bolster the claims of Oviedo and its shrine against those of Santiago.
