= Sudarium =

Cloth for wiping the face clean

A sudarium (Latin) was a "sweat cloth", used for wiping the face clean. Small cloths of various sorts, for which sudarium is a general term, played a role in Ancient Roman formal manners and court ceremonial, and many such uses transferred to Christian liturgical usage and art. In Jewish usage, it is the cloth-like habit worn by Jewish men after a wedding, wrapped around the head and usually worn with a central hat.

The term was borrowed into Jewish languages as sud[a]ra. In the Babylonian Talmud, Moed Katan 15a and Eruvin 84b describe wearing the כּוּמְתָא וְסוּדָרָא kuməṯā wisuḏārā "skullcap (kumetha) and sudarium", and Kiddushin 29b, it mentions a rabbi named Hamnuna who refused to wear the sudarium on his head until he was married, meaning his head was only covered by a kumetha. (Note: Smith, J. Payne (1903). A Compendious Syriac Dictionary (in Syriac). Oxford: University of Oxford., p. 364, s.v. sudarium.)

Sudarium often refers to two relics of the Passion of Jesus: the Sudarium of Oviedo and the Veil of Veronica. Another sudarium is found in the Old Monastery of Mainz, and was supposedly given to the Frankish noblewoman Bilihildis of Altmünster of Frankish Mainz; it is locally venerated since the 15th century.

In the Roman Catholic and other Western churches, the term sudarium has been used for several ornamental textile objects:

- The sudarium or maniple (manipulus, also mappula, mantile, fano, manuale, sestace, Greek epigonation, earlier encheirion), a cloth of fine quality to wipe away perspiration, or an ornamental handkerchief which was seldom put into actual use, but was generally carried in the hand as an ornament as was commonly done by people of rank in ordinary life, now formalized as a vestment, in liturgical use from the 12th century reserved for the bishop; the subcinctorium is a related ornamental vestment reserved for the pope.
- The predecessor of the humeral veil
- The predecessor of the vimpa, a veil or shawl worn over the shoulders of servers who carry the mitre and crosier in liturgical functions when the bishop is not using them
- The cloth suspended from the crozier at the place where the bishop would grasp it, is still depicted in ecclesiastical heraldry and used by Cistercian abbots. Also called pannisellus
- The veil used by the subdeacon to hold the paten; a pall(a) or mappula, the forerunner of the chalice veil, the ends of which he threw over his right shoulder

== References and Notes ==
- Sudarium articles from The Catholic Encyclopaedia
