= Sudarium of Oviedo =

Relic shrouding Jesus after death

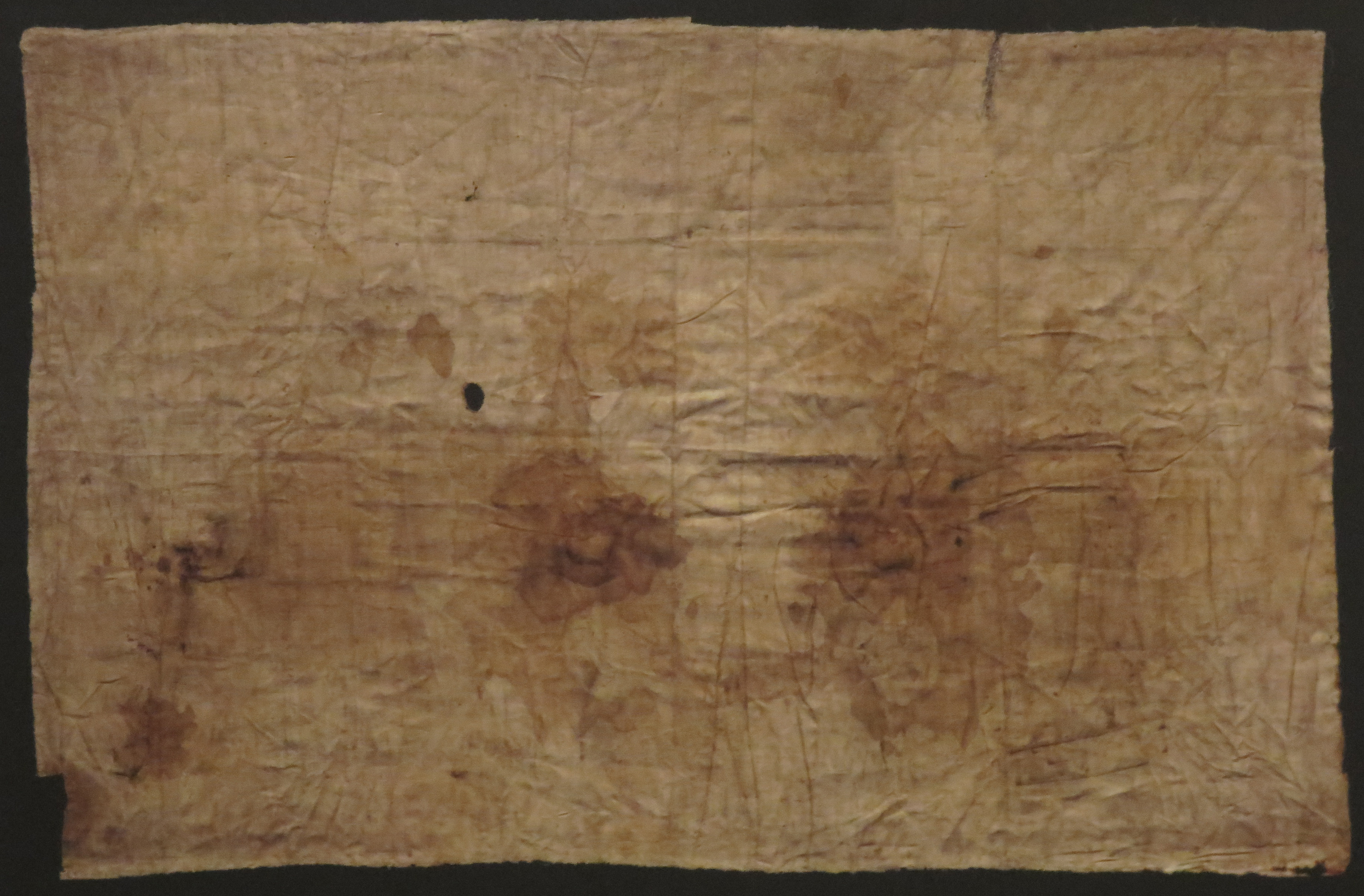
The Sudarium of Oviedo

The Sudarium of Oviedo, or Shroud of Oviedo, is a bloodstained piece of linen cloth in plain 1/1 weave with a Z-twist thread measuring c. 84 cm × 53 cm (33 by 21 inches) kept in the Cámara Santa of the Cathedral of San Salvador, Oviedo, Spain. The Sudarium (Latin for sweat cloth) is linked to a legend of a cloth wrapped around the head of Jesus Christ after he died as described in John 20:6–7. The small rectangular linen bears no image of a human body or face, and consists of reddish-brown stains.

The cloth has been dated multiple times to around 700 AD by radiocarbon dating conducted through laboratories at the University of Arizona in 1990, University of Toronto in 1992, and again in 2007 at the National Museum of Archaeology. The results of which are inconsistent with a history purportedly extending back to c. 570 due to a possible reference to the Sudarium by the anonymous pilgrim of Piacenza. Historical and textile analysis indicate it was woven in the 8th century, with the first document to explicitly speak of the relic dated to March 14, 1075 in Europe.

The small chapel housing it was built specifically for the cloth by King Alfonso II of Asturias in AD 840; the Arca Santa is an elaborate reliquary chest with a Romanesque metal frontal for the storage of the Sudarium and other relics. The Sudarium is displayed to the public three times a year: Good Friday, the Feast of the Exaltation of the Cross on 14 September, and its octave on 21 September.

== Background and history ==
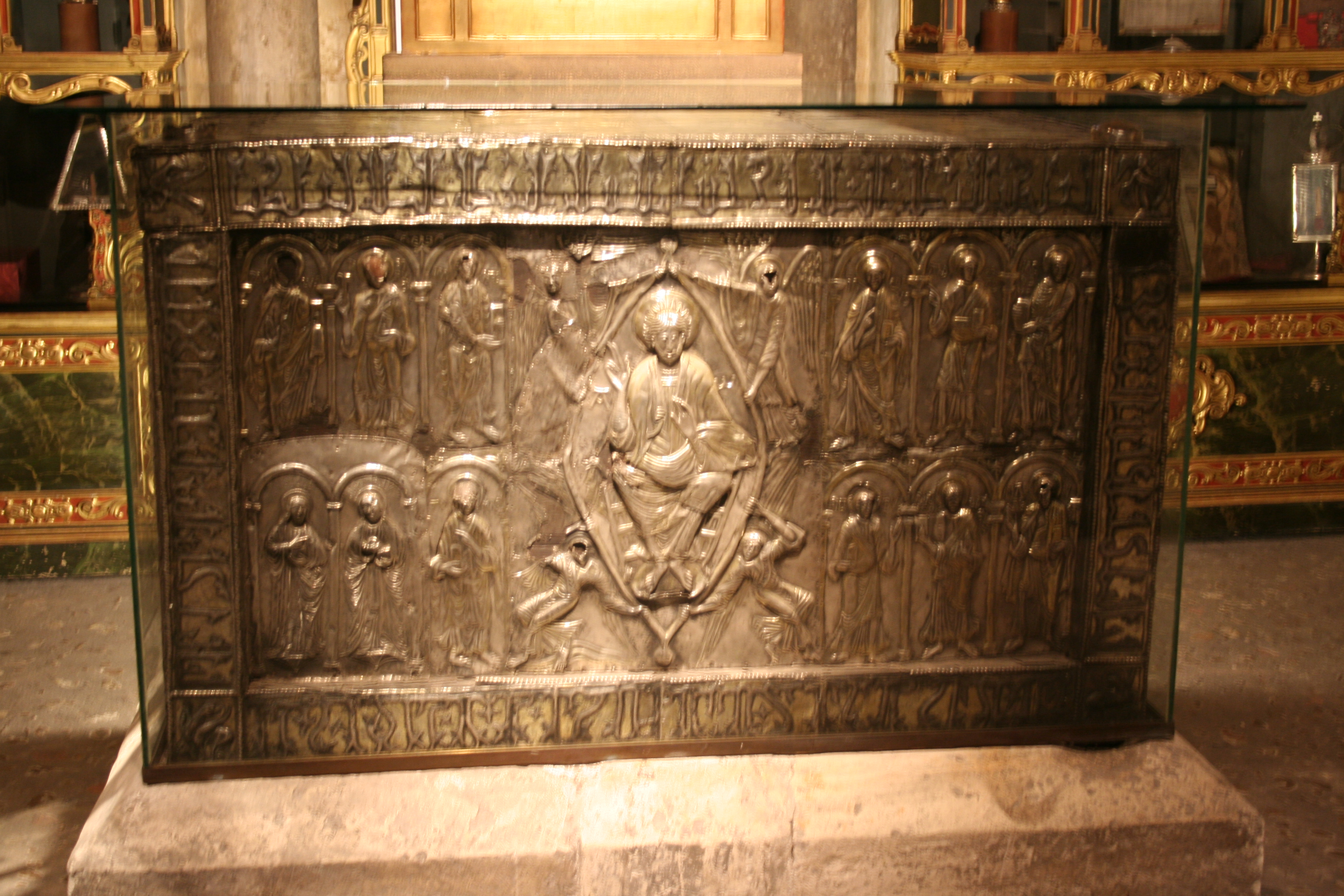
The ark that contains the Sudarium of Oviedo

The Sudarium shows signs of advanced deterioration, with dark flecks that are symmetrically arranged but form no image, unlike the markings on the Shroud of Turin. The sudarium is linked by the devoted to a face cloth in the empty tomb mentioned by John 20:6–7. Outside of the Bible, the anonymous pilgrim of Piacenza recorded in 570 AD that he visited a cave on the Jordan rumored to have the face cloth mentioned in John.

Pelagius of Oviedo, a bishop of medieval Spain, gives an account of the Sudarium's history from the Holy Land to Spain preserved in the Liber testamentorum and interpolated into the Chronica ad Sebastianum in the Liber chronicorum. However, this narrative is met with skepticism due to Pelagius of Oviedo being criticized for the large amount of forgery that took place from his office leading him to being dubbed "The Prince of Falsifiers".

This account claims the Sudarium was taken from Israel in 614 AD, after the invasion of the Byzantine provinces by the Sassanid Persian King Khosrau II. To avoid destruction in the invasion, it was taken away first to Alexandria by the presbyter Philip, who then carried it through northern Africa when Khosrau II conquered Alexandria in 616 AD, and arrived in Spain shortly thereafter. The Sudarium entered Spain at Cartagena, along with people who were fleeing from the Persians. Fulgentius, bishop of Ecija, welcomed the refugees and the relics, and gave the chest containing the Sudarium to Leandro, bishop of Seville. He took it to Seville, where it spent some years.

In 657 it was moved to Toledo, then in 718 on to northern Spain to escape the advancing Moors. The Sudarium was hidden in the mountains of Asturias in a cave known as Montesacro until King Alfonso II, having battled back the Moors, built a chapel in Oviedo to house it in 840 AD.

On 14 March 1075, King Alfonso VI of Leon, his sister and Rodrigo Diaz Vivar (El Cid) opened the chest after days of fasting. The event was recorded on a document preserved in the Capitular Archives at the Cathedral of San Salvador in Oviedo. The king had the oak chest covered in silver with an inscription that reads, "The Sacred Sudarium of Our Lord Jesus Christ". The medieval narratives and legends surrounding the Sudarium of Oviedo are considered by historians to have been created by Pelagius.

== Relic analysis and critiques ==
In 2025, Kelly P. Kearse addressed claims of the AB blood group being shared amongst relics associated with Jesus and Eucharist hosts. His research revealed that microbial contamination can cause false positives, as AB antigens are not unique to human red blood cells, but are expressed in numerous bacteria and fungi. Such items preserved over centuries are heavily contaminated with microorganisms, making standard antibody serological tests ineffective. With the Sudarium Oviedo, antigen reactivity was observed in all areas of the fabric, including those with no stains. Kearse recommended stronger control testing with human-specific identifiers and DNA sequencing methods such as STR or HLA, as well as the need for peer review in scientific journals and verifications by BPA experts.

== See also ==
- Bilihildis, recipient of a sudarium
- Blood of Christ
- Empty tomb
- Mandylion
- Pray Codex
- Tomb of the Shroud
- True Cross
- Veil of Veronica
