= Cámara Santa =

Roman Catholic church in Oviedo, Spain

Holy chamber of Oviedo Cámara Santa de Oviedo (in Spanish)
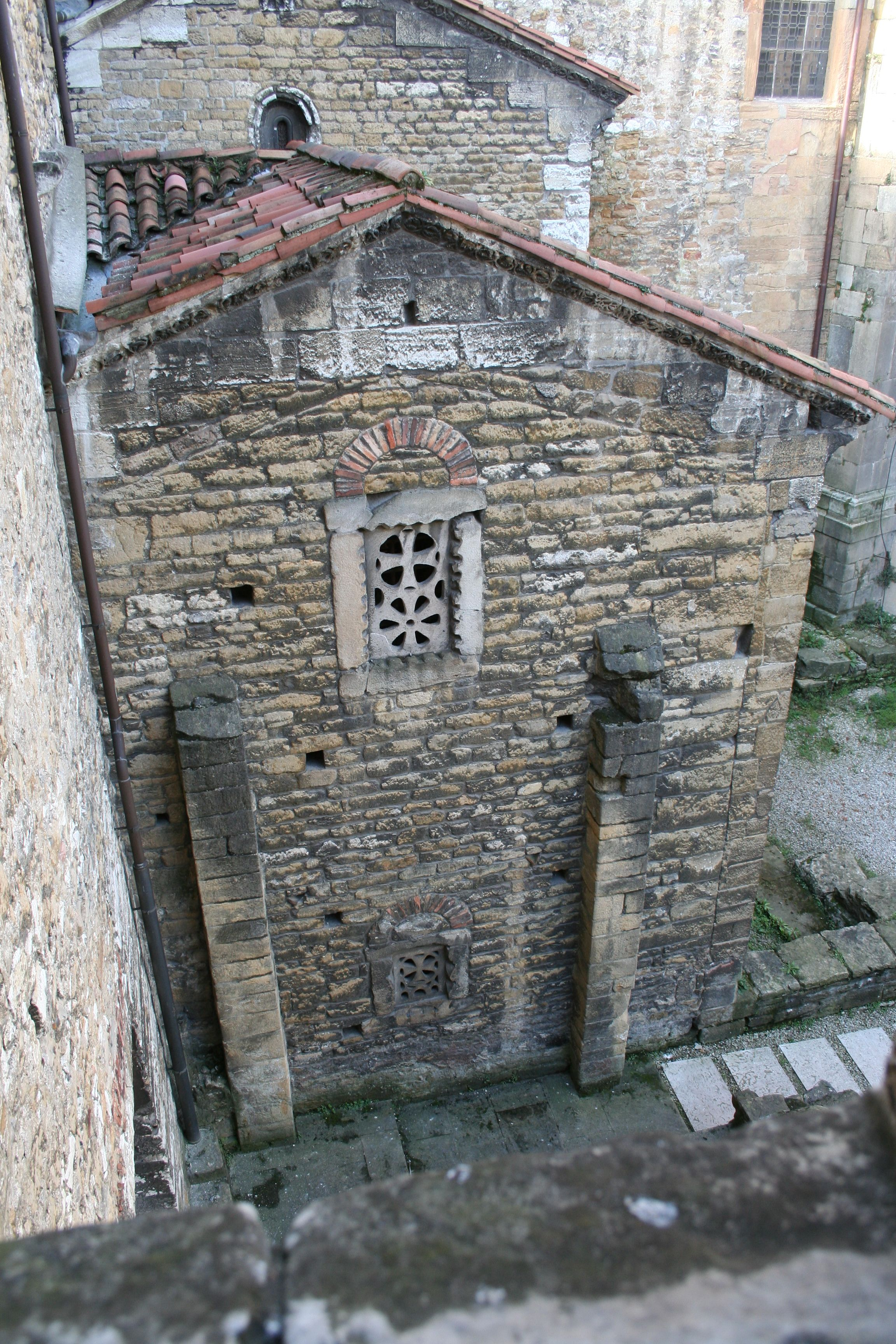

Religion
- Affiliation: Roman Catholic
- Ecclesiastical or organisational status: Chapel

Location
- Location: Oviedo (Asturias), Spain
- Interactive map of Holy chamber of Oviedo; Cámara Santa de Oviedo (in Spanish)
- Coordinates: 43°21′44″N 5°50′34.37″W

Architecture
- Type: Church
- Style: Pre-Romanesque
- Completed: 9th century
- UNESCO World Heritage Site
- Type: Cultural
- Criteria: ii, iv, vi
- Designated: 1985 (9th session)
- Parent listing: Monuments of Oviedo and the Kingdom of the Asturias
- Reference no.: 312-004
- Region: Europe and North America

Website
- Official Website

The Holy chamber of Oviedo (Spanish: Cámara Santa de Oviedo, also known as the chapel of St. Michael) is a Roman Catholic church built in a pre-Romanesque style in Oviedo, Spain, next to the pre-Romanesque Tower of San Miguel of the city's cathedral. The church occupies the angle between the south arm of the cathedral transept and a side of the cloister.

It was built during the 9th century as a palace chapel for King Alfonso II of Asturias and the church of San Salvador of Oviedo. Apart from acting as royal chapel, the Holy Chamber was built to house the jewels and relics of the cathedral of San Salvador in Oviedo, a function it continues to have 1200 years later. Some of these jewels were donated by the Kings Alfonso II and Alfonso III, and represent extraordinary gold artifacts of Asturian Pre-Romanesque, brought from Toledo after the fall of the Visigothic kingdom.

Consequently, the cathedral of Oviedo was also called Sancta Ovetensis; owing to quantity and quality of relics contained in the Cámara Santa (English: Holy Chamber). The Holy Chamber remains as the only sample of the early medieval complex. It was built as a relics' room to keep the different treasures associated with the Kingdom of Asturias (Cross of the Angels, Victory Cross, Agate box, Arca Santa and Sudarium of Oviedo), brought from Jerusalem to Africa, and after several translations was finally deposited at Oviedo by Alfonso II of Asturias.

It was declared a World Heritage Site by UNESCO in December 1998.

== Architecture ==
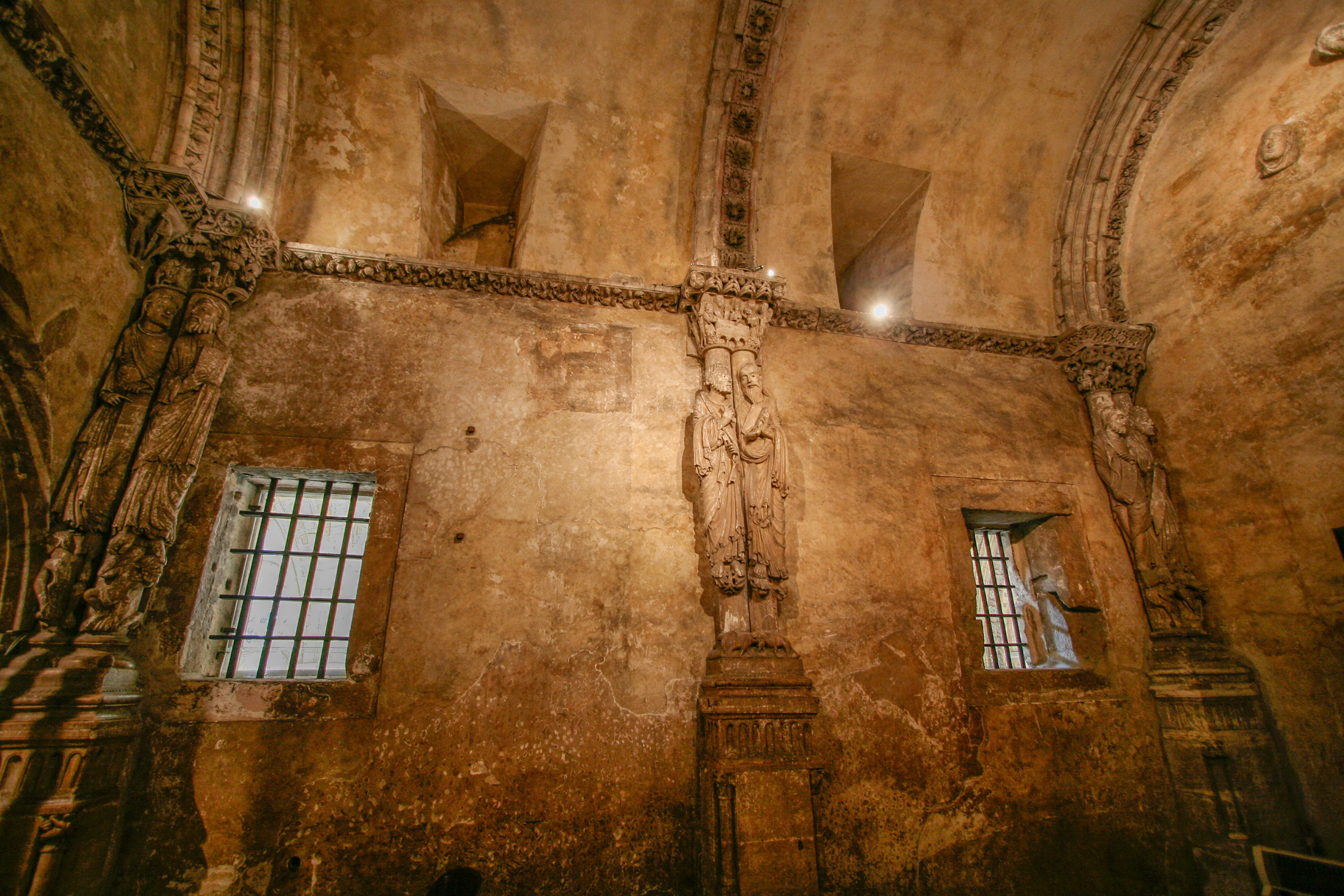
Holy chamber - Chapel of St Michael.

It consists of two overlapping aisles with a barrel vault; the crypt or lower floor has a height of 2.30 metres, and is dedicated to St. Leocadia, containing several tombs of other martyrs.

The crypt of St. Leocadia is a rectangular chamber with walls of rubble. It has a rude semicircular unbroken barrel vault, barely 80 cm high at the crown. Originally it was lighted by very narrow windows, mere loopholes, splayed internally, in the side walls, and by one large window at the east end.

The Camara Santa consists of a square eastern sanctuary, attached to a rectangular cella. The sanctuary has a low barrel vault. Its frontal arch is carried by two marble columns of Roman origin. A pair of similar columns decorate the east window, which internally has an arch, but externally a square head with a rude brick relieving arch, just like the east window of the crypt below. Their capitals have a Corinthian style, with leaves packed into shells, relief being produced by the drill, and recall an angle capital in San Julián de los Prados.

On the upper floor, the Camara Santa dedicated to St. Michael, was extended in the 12th century, elongating the central section to six metres.

== Sudarium of Oviedo ==
The Sudarium of Oviedo, or Shroud of Oviedo, also cloth of Oviedo, is a bloodstained cloth kept in the Arca Santa for which the chapel was built. The Sudarium (Latin for sweat cloth) is claimed to be the cloth wrapped around the head of Jesus Christ after he died. There are notable congruencies with a number of related acheiropoieta images such those of the Turin and Manoppello.

== See also ==
- Asturian architecture
- Catholic Church in Spain
