= Cross of the Angels =

9th-century Asturian jewelled cross

- Cruz de los Ángeles (Spanish)
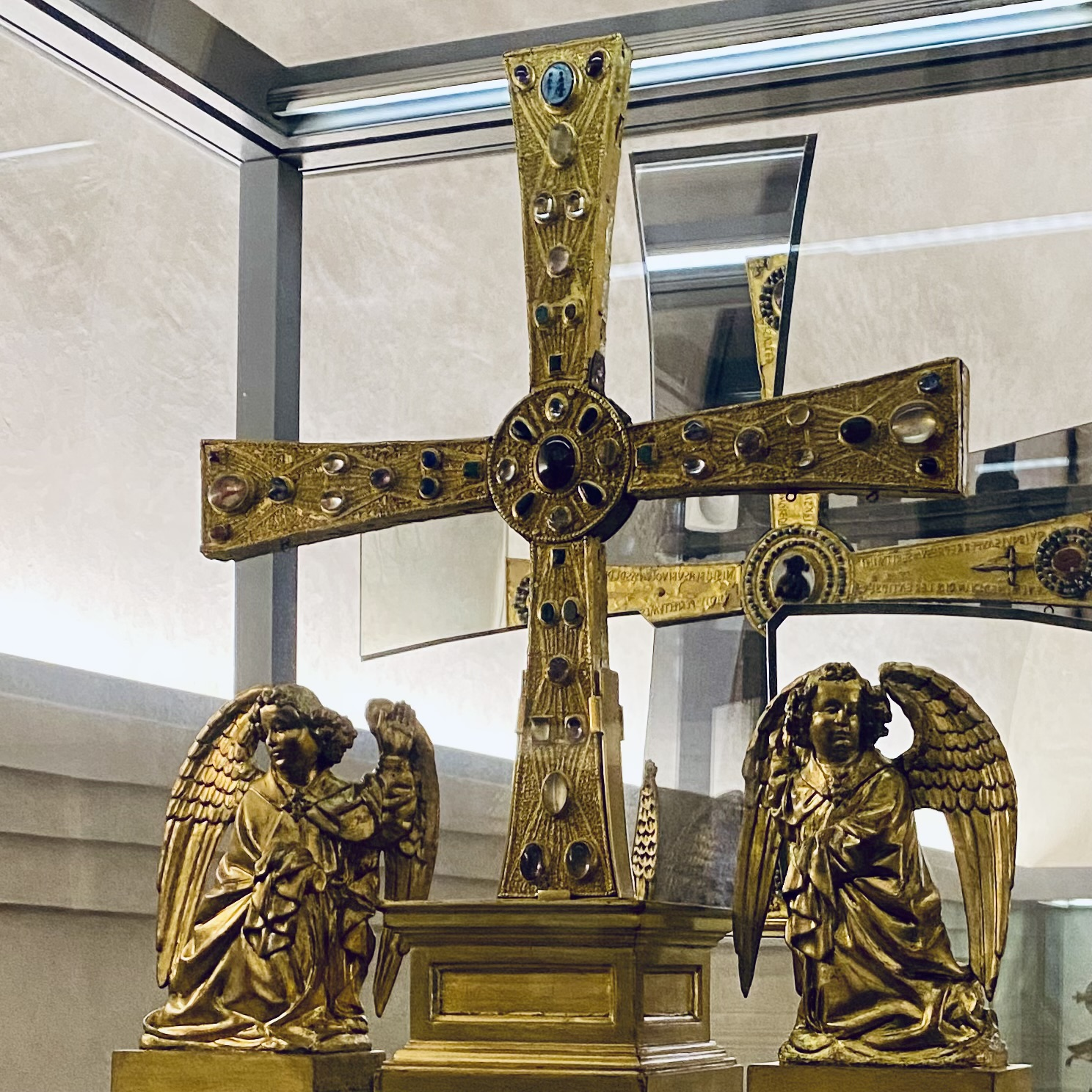
- Year: 808
- Type: gold work
- Dimensions: 46.5 cm × 45.7 cm × 2.5 cm (18.3 in × 18.0 in × 0.98 in)
- Location: Cámara Santa; Oviedo

The Cross of the Angels (Asturian: Cruz de los Ánxeles, Spanish: Cruz de los Ángeles) is a pre-romanesque Asturian reliquary donated by Alfonso II of Asturias in the year 808 to the Church of San Salvador in Oviedo, Asturias (Spain). The Cross of the Angels is the symbol of the city of Oviedo.

The cross is the first example of jewelry made in the Kingdom of Asturias that has reached our days. Its current appearance is the result of careful reconstruction carried out after the damages the cross underwent in August 1977 after the robbery of the Camara Santa. Its squared dimensions (46.5 centimetres (18.3 in), 45.7 centimetres (18.0 in) wide and 2.5 centimetres (0.98 in) thick) are typical from Greek crosses. The cross is formed by two pieces of cedar wood with, at the center, a round disc.

== History ==
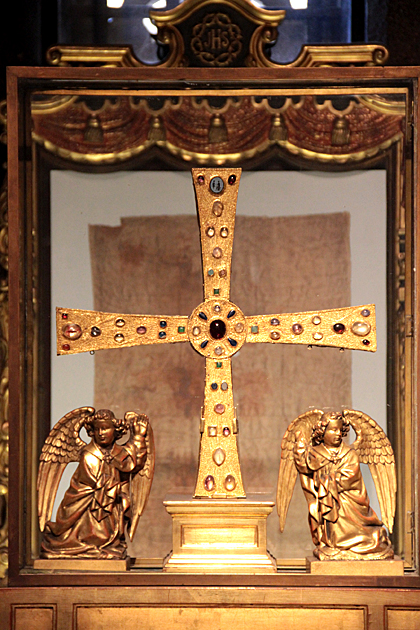
The Cross of the Angels

The donation is usually interpreted as a sign of gratitude of the monarch after being restored to the throne, after the years of his incarceration in the monastery of Abelania.

== Reliquary ==
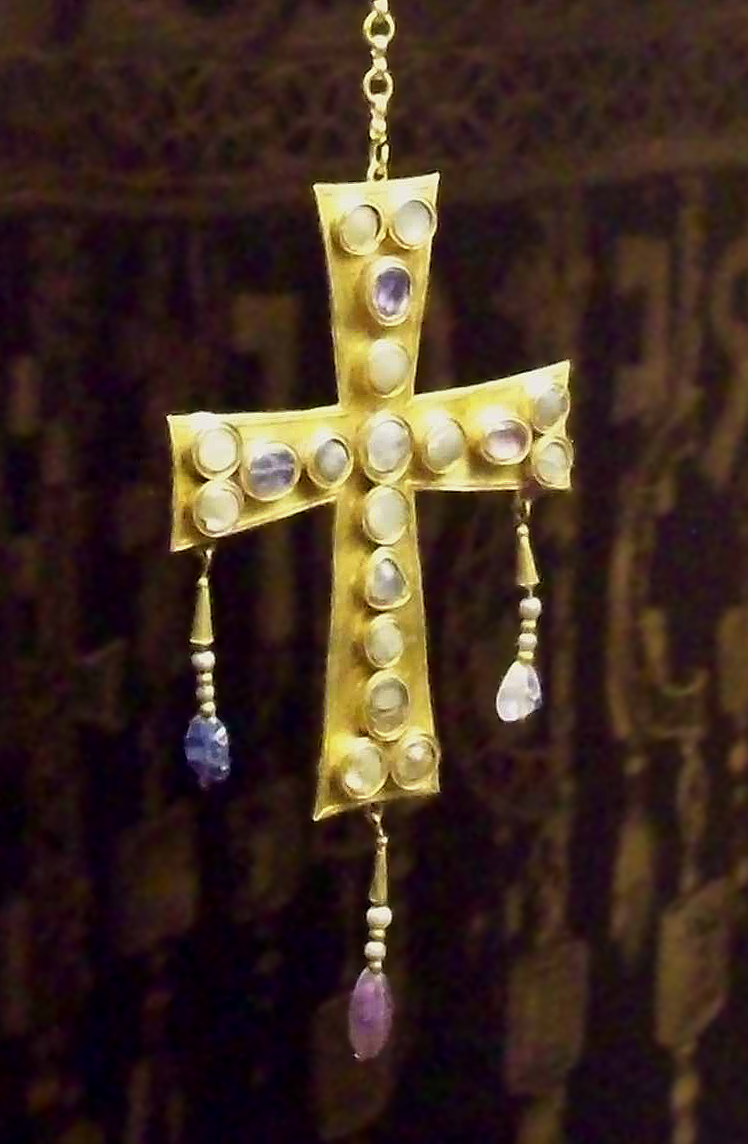
Visigothic votive cross of the Treasure of Guarrazar, made of gold, precious stones, nacre and glass (7th century).

Permanezca Esto Gratamente Acogido En Honor De Dios.Alfonso, Humilde Esclavo De Cristo, Lo Ofrece. Con Este Signo Se Protege Al Piadoso, Con Este Signo Se Vence Al Enemigo. Quien Se Atreviera A Arrebatarme, Excepto Donde Mi Libre Voluntad Me Dejare, Sea Muerto Por El Rayo Divino. Esta Obra Fue Acabada En La Era 846

The lateral arms have kept the rings from which hang chains with pearls and precious stones, also known as pendilia, comparable to votive crosses and crowns of the Visigothic treasure of Guarrazar.

== Symbol of the City of Oviedo ==
The Cross of the Angels became the symbol of the city of Oviedo around the 15th century, although it is said that even earlier, in 1262, it was used as a seal of the city. This is reflected in an engraving in the old city walls where the cross, with the Greek letters alpha and omega hanging of his arms, is used as a sign of consecration. Nowadays, the cross is present in the coat of arms of both the city of Oviedo and the Roman Catholic Archdiocese of Oviedo.

== See also ==
- Treasure of Guarrazar
