= Agate Casket of Oviedo =

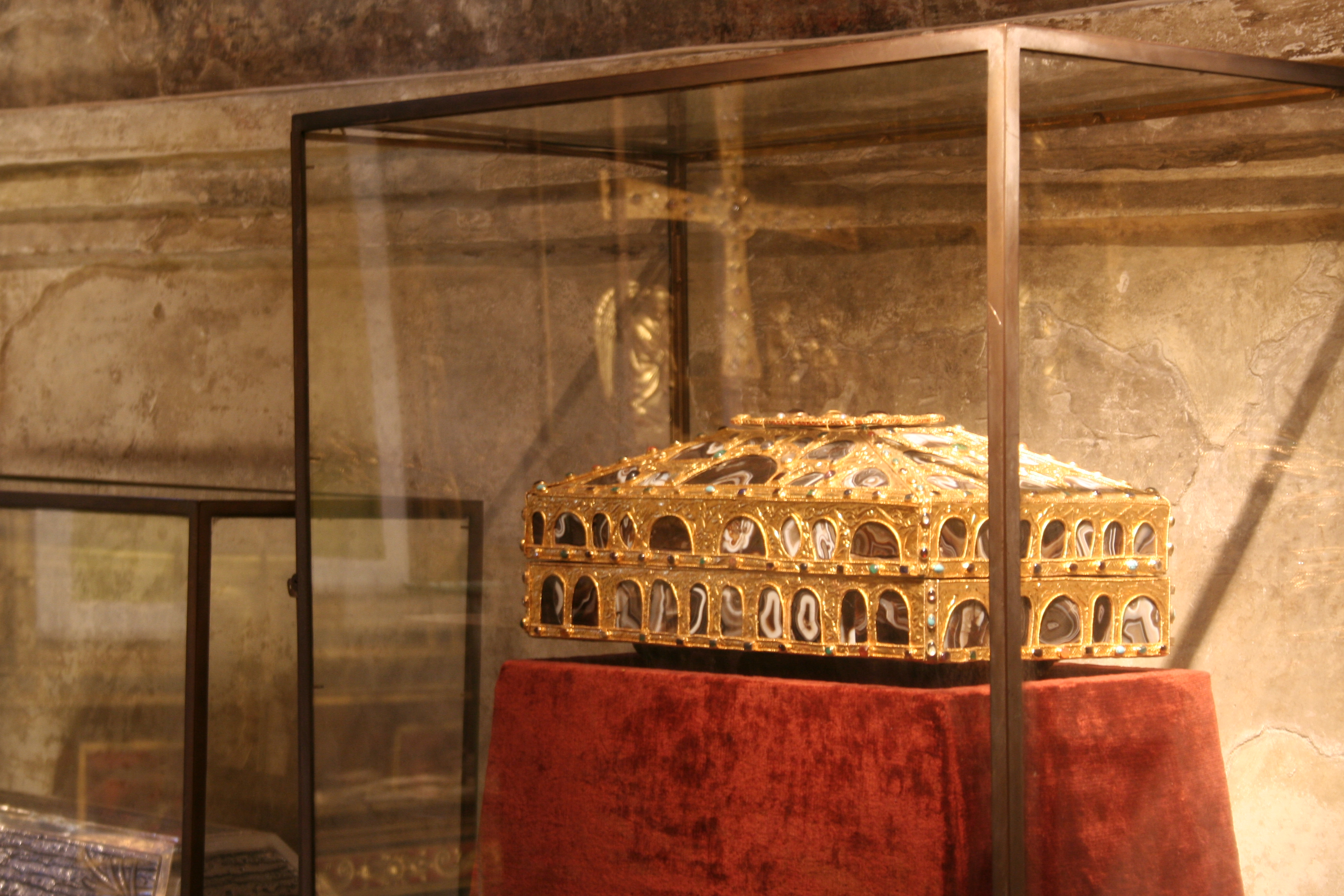
The Agate box in the Cámara Santa (Holy Chamber) of the Cathedral of Oviedo.

The Agate Casket of Oviedo (Spanish: Caja de las Ágatas, sometimes in English Agate Box, "Box of Agates") is an elaborately decorated box, casket or small chest given by King Fruela II of Asturias and his wife Nunila to the Cathedral of San Salvador, Oviedo, Spain. This masterpiece of 10th century Asturian gold work is kept in the Cámara Santa (Holy Chamber) treasury.

== Construction ==
It is a rectangular box made of wood of European Pear, with a lid in the shape of a truncated pyramid. The Agate box is 42 centimetres (17 in) long, 27.5 centimetres (10.8 in) wide and 25 centimetres (9.8 in) high. The wooden box is covered with sheets of gold forming unequal arches in which 99 large flat sections of veined agate are mounted. The gold is decorated with cabochon gemstones and coral. The top of the lid is a gold plaque with a cross and three large gems which was taken from an older piece. It is decorated with small animals in enamel in a kind of champlevé technique that is only found in one other work, the South German rear cover of the Lindau Gospels, of the late 8th century, now in the Morgan Library, New York.

The base of the box is made of pure silver, with a cross made of gems and with a carved tetramorph, representing the four evangelists: the angel of St. Matthew, the Lion of St. Mark, the ox of St. Luke and the eagle of St. John. The inscription which describes the donation of the box to the cathedral is engraved on the basex. It reads:

SVSCEPTVM PLACIDE MANEAT HOC IN HO[NO]RE DI QVOD / OFFERVN[T] FAMVLI XPI FROILA ET NVNILO / COGNONENTO SCEMENA. HOC OPVS PERFECTVM ET CONCES/SVM EST SCG SALVATORI OVETENSIS. QVISQVIS / AVFERRE HOC DONARIA NSA PRSVMSERI FVLMINE DIVINO INTEREAT IPSE. OPERATVM EST ERA DCCCCX VIII. May this peaceful undertaking in honour of God endure, which Freula and Nunilo surnamed Jimena gave, obedient to Christ. This work was completed and yielded to the preserver of Oviedo. May he destroy any who removes this gift with divine thunder. This was done in the year 918.
