= Oviedo Cathedral =

Roman Catholic church and minor basilica in Oviedo, Spain

Cathedral of the Holy Saviour
- Catedral de San Salvador
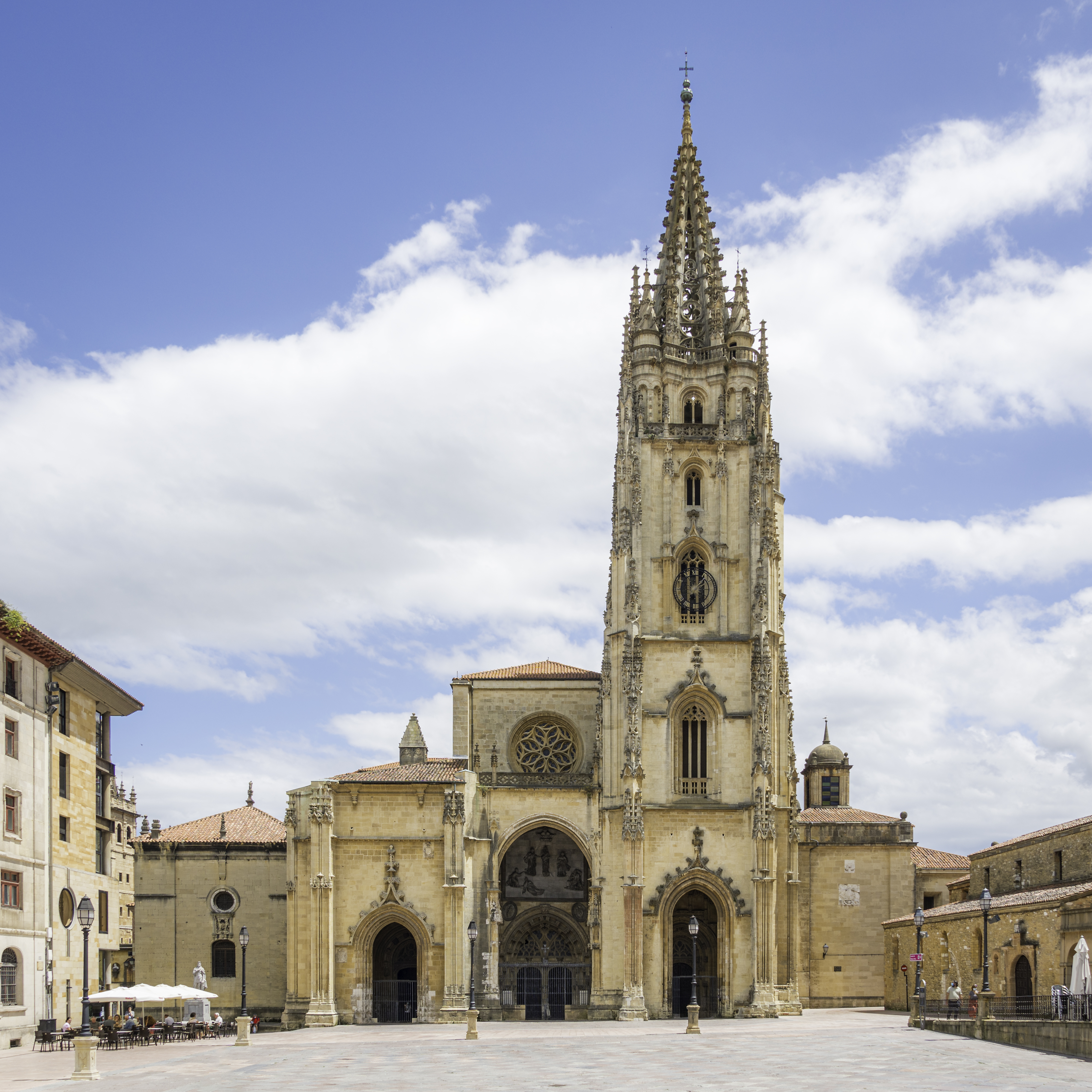
- Façade of the cathedral

Religion
- Affiliation: Roman Catholic Church
- Ecclesiastical or organisational status: Cathedral, Minor basilica
- Leadership: Archbishop Jesús Sanz Montes

Location
- Location: Oviedo, Spain
- Interactive map of Cathedral of the Holy Saviour
- Coordinates: 43°21′45.30″N 5°50′35.09″W

Architecture
- Architect: Rodrigo Gil de Hontañón
- Type: Church
- Style: Gothic, Romanesque, Baroque, Renaissance
- Groundbreaking: 781
- Direction of façade: O
- UNESCO World Heritage Site
- Type: Cultural
- Criteria: ii, iv, vi
- Designated: 1993 (17th session)
- Parent listing: Routes of Santiago de Compostela: Camino Francés and Routes of Northern Spain
- Reference no.: 669bis-005
- Region: Europe and North America
- Spanish Cultural Heritage
- Type: Non-movable
- Criteria: Monument
- Designated: 3 June 1931
- Reference no.: RI-51-0000785

Website
- Official Website

The Metropolitan Cathedral Basilica of the Holy Saviour or Cathedral of San Salvador (Spanish: Catedral Metropolitana Basílica de San Salvador, Latin: Sancta Ovetensis) is a Roman Catholic church and minor basilica in the centre of Oviedo, in the Asturias region of northern Spain.

The Cathedral of San Salvador of Oviedo today displays an array of architectural styles, from Pre-Romanesque to Baroque, including Romanesque, Gothic and Renaissance parts.

== History ==
The church began as a large Pre-Romanesque basilica in the present location of the Gothic cathedral, but nothing more is known about that first building, built by order of King Alfonso II of Asturias.

The cathedral was founded by King Fruela I of Asturias in 781 AD, and enlarged in 802 by his son Alfonso II of Asturias known as Alfonso the Chaste, who made Oviedo the capital of Kingdom of Asturias, and resided in Oviedo with his court. He created the See of Oviedo in 810. The present edifice was begun by Bishop Gutierre of Toledo in 1388, and the tower added by Cardinal Francisco Mendoza de Bobadilla in 1528.

The cathedral was restored in the 12th century by Archbishop Pelagius of Oviedo, the chronicler. Bishop Fernando Alfonso (1296–1301) undertook another restoration of the chapter-house, and his successor, Fernando Alvarez (1302–1321), began the cloister. At the end of the 13th century Gutierre de Toledo began the new Gothic basilica, the principal chapel bearing his arms, though it was completed by his successor Guillén. Diego Ramirez de Guzmán (1421–1441) built the two chapels of the south transept (now replaced by the sacristy), the old entrance to the church, and the gallery of the cloister adjoining the chapter-house. Alonzo de Palenzuela (1470–1485) completed the other part of the transept. Juan Arias (1487–1497) left his cognizance, the fleur-de-lys and four scallops, on the nave. Juan Daza (1497–1503) erected the grille of the choir; Valerano (1508–1512) added the stained-glass windows.

Diego de Muros, founder of the great college at Salamanca known as the Oviedo, had the crestings of the porch wrought by Pedro de Bunyeres and Juan de Cerecedo, while Giralte de Bruselas and Juan de Balmaseda completed in the years 1512 to 1517 the carving of the precious altarpiece ordered by Valeriano Órdoñez de Villaquirán. Cristóbal de Rojas (1546–1556) affixed his coat-of-arms to the completed tower, with its octagonal pyramid, one of the marvels of Gothic architecture.

== Building ==
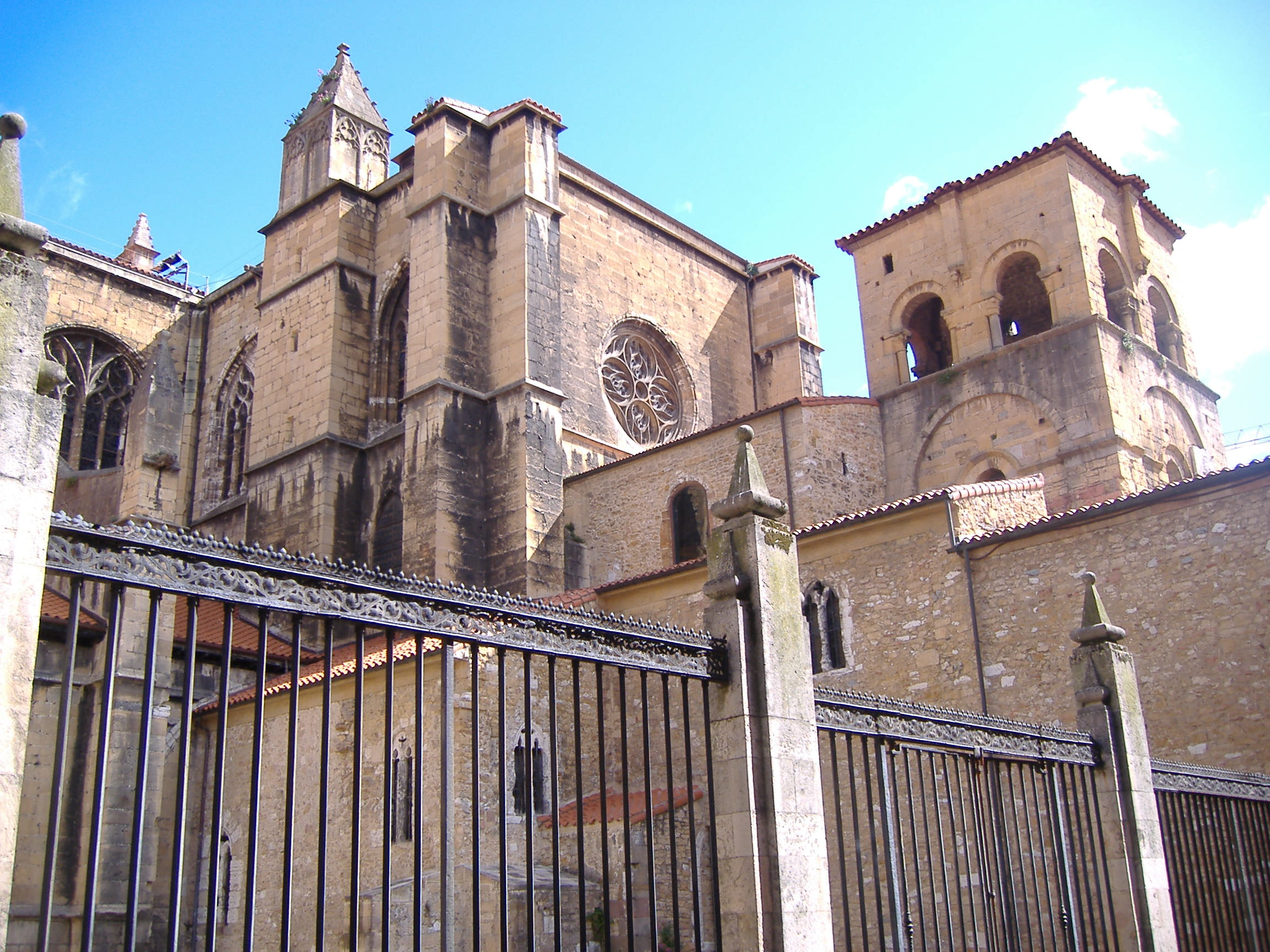
The old romanesque Tower of San Salvador

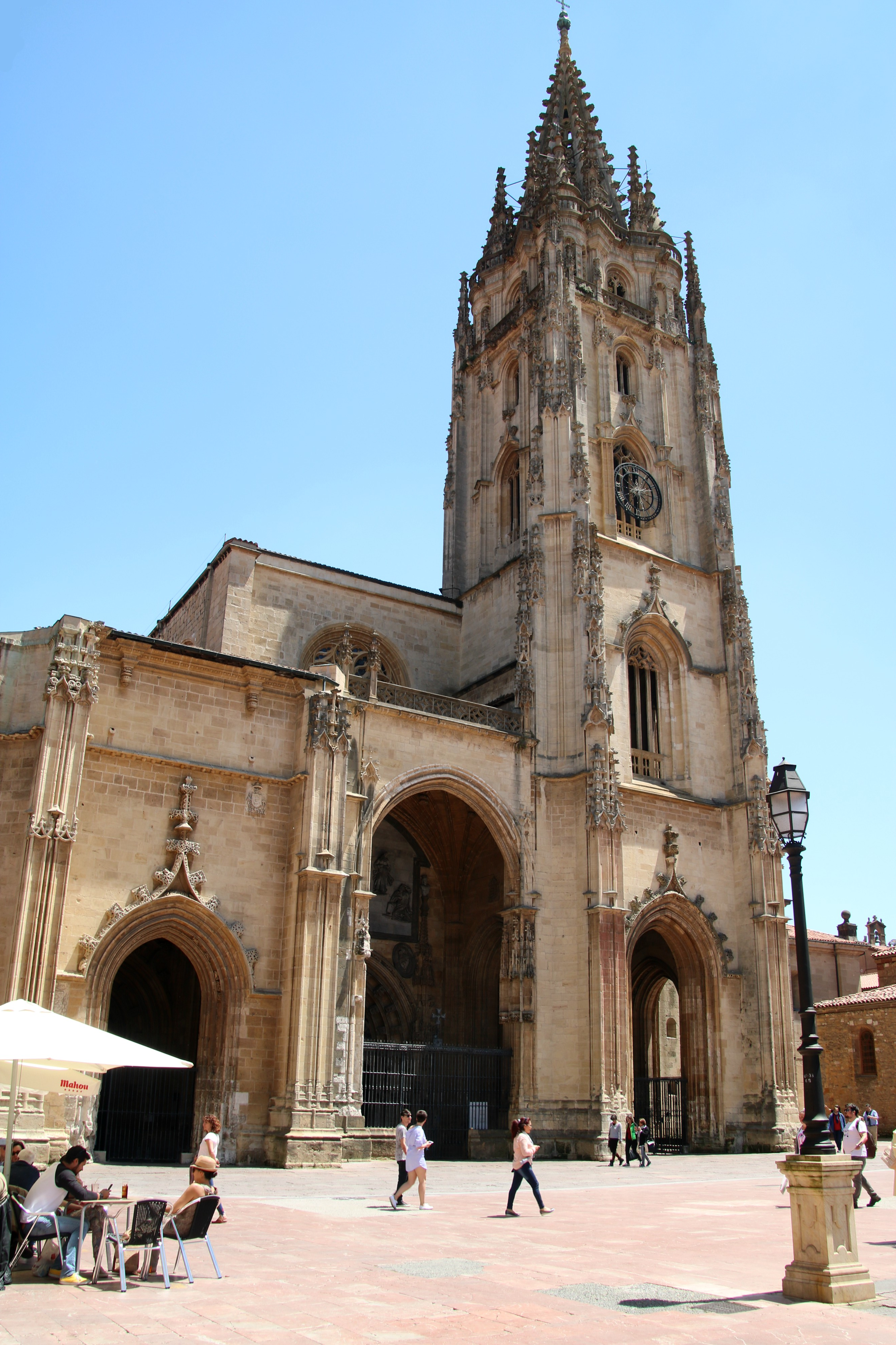
The cathedral

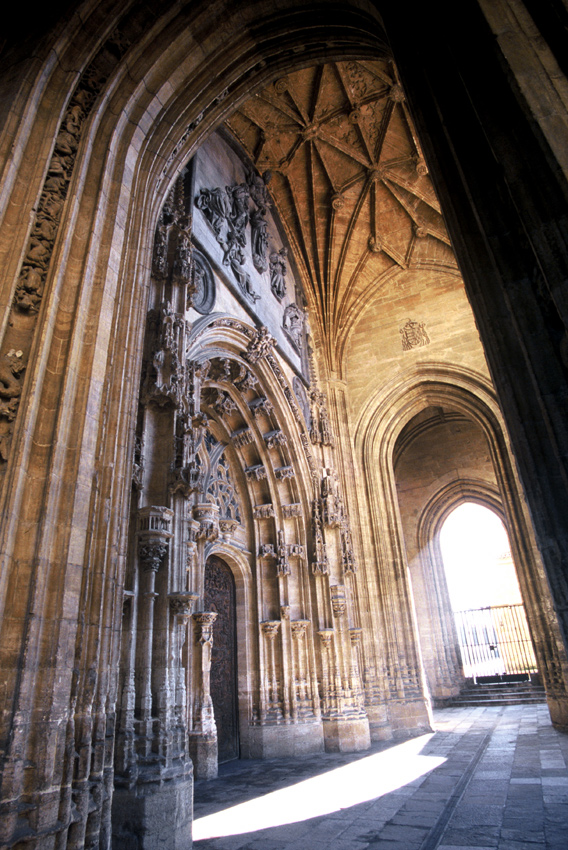
Portico of the cathedral

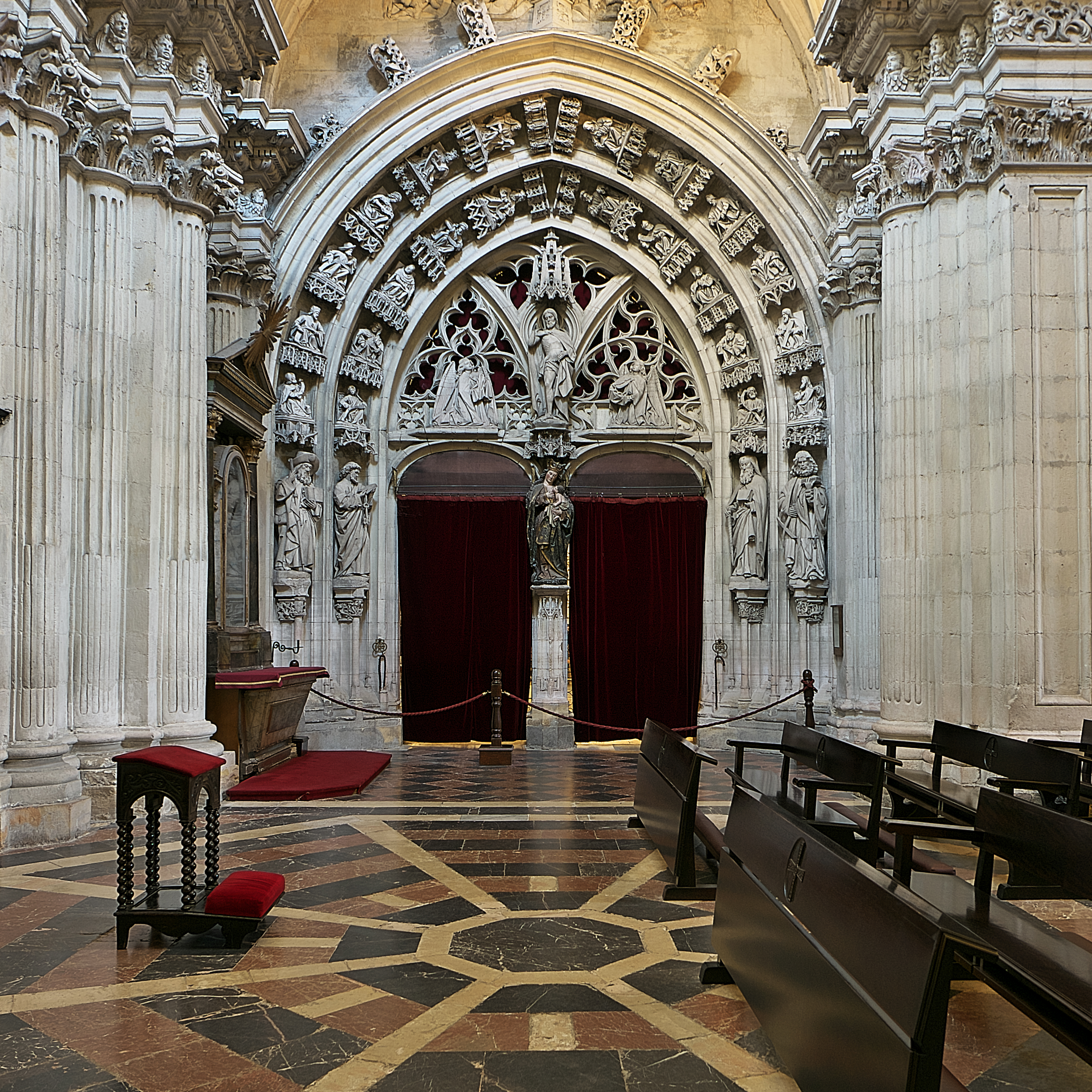
Rey Casto chapel, Asturian-kings royal pantheon

The origins of Oviedo Cathedral date back to the late 8th century, when Asturian king Alfonso II of Asturias promoted the construction of a basilica at the core of the Kingdom of Asturias' newly established royal court (regia sedes): what today conforms the oldest part of Oviedo's historic centre was then a political and religious complex that included a royal palace, several churches, monasteries, baths, stables, etc. This primitive basilica was consecrated to the Holy Saviour and the Apostles, and built in a typical pre-Romanesque Asturian style, with a straight-shaped sanctuary preceded by three aisles.

In 910, the founding of the Kingdom of León led to the translation of the royal court from its original location in Oviedo to the city of León, at the southern side of the Cantabrian Mountains. However, the Oviedo settlement remained as an episcopal site, surrounded by a typical medieval town which would become an important stop in the northern branch of the Way of St. James. In this context, the old basilica founded by Alfonso II became a cathedral, undergoing successive changes during the Early and Late Middle Ages. The building known as Cámara Santa ("Holy Chamber") is the most important surviving structure from the primitive pre-Romanesque royal complex: it is a two-story building with a rectangular plan, which shelters several burials in its lower floor and keeps a collection of royal treasures and relics in the upper floor, like the well-known Cross of the Angels ("Cruz de los ángeles") and the Victory Cross ("Cruz de la victoria"), both of them important symbols of the Asturian monarchy.

During the 12th century, because of the constant flow of pilgrims and visitors, the Cámara Santa was reformed: it was then when the aisle in the upper floor was decorated with an excellent group of late Romanesque column statues depicting the Apostles; additionally, a barrel vault was added, replacing the former ceiling made of wooden beams. Another Romanesque element is the "Torre Vieja" ("Old Tower"), a bell tower with pre-Romanesque foundations which was heightened with the addition of an arched gallery and a ribbed vault. Additionally, several archaeological evidences suggest the existence of a Romanesque cloister which would have preceded the current Gothic cloister.

During the Late Middle Ages, Oviedo Cathedral underwent major changes, becoming the most important architectural workshop of Asturias: between c. 1300–1550, the old pre-Romanesque basilica, as well as its presumed Romanesque premises, were demolished and replaced by a set of classic and flamboyant Gothic elements, including the chapter room, the cloister, the main chapel and the aisles, as well as the western facade and tower. The chapter room was probably built between 1293 and 1314: it is the cathedral's oldest Gothic structure, a diaphanous, square-plan hall covered by an eight-sided dome, under which several noble lineages decided to build their burials. The Gothic cloister was already a work in progress around 1300, although it was not finished until the mid-15th century: it was built thanks to the generous contributions of the Camara Santa's Brotherhood (established in 1344), several noble patrons and Castilian king Alfonso XI, as well as the money gathered by the bishop's tax collectors. It is a rectangular space surrounded by galleries, whose tracery windows reflect the evolution of the Gothic style, from early classic to late flamboyant.

Oviedo episcopate decided to undertake the construction of a new church: this implied the gradual demolition of the old pre-Romanesque basilica, which was probably regarded as old fashioned and inconvenient. Bishop Gutierre de Toledo fostered the erection of his own private funerary chapel (destroyed during the Early Modern period) and the main chapel, a poligonal apse preceded by a square section: the late Gothic altarpiece and the Baroque ambulatory have modified the appearance of this sanctuary, whose walls were originally pierced by two levels of windows. The works evolved at a slow pace, and by 1451 only the main chapel had been concluded. However, during the second half of the 15th century this situation was reversed, and by 1500 both the transept and the three aisles were finished. According to some scholars, there must have existed a first, "general" draft inspired by certain French models, like the Bayonne Cathedral: in any case, this initial draft would be altered as the construction works progressed. By 1450, Nicolás de Bar and Nicolás de Bruselas, two master builders from Northern Europe, supervised the Oviedo workshop: apparently, it was during their direction when the new flamboyant style was introduced. Spanish master builders Juan de Candamo (between 1458 and 1489) and Bartolomé de Solórzano (between 1492 and 1498) later assumed the direction of the cathedral workshop, building the central and side aisles, as well as the innovative vaults of the central aisle, with multiple ribs and detached tracery pieces.

By 1500, the cathedral was almost finished, with exception of its western facade: that very year, master builder Juan de Badajoz "el Viejo" ("the Elder") became the new director of the episcopal workshop, starting the construction of a prominent narthex which would form a spacious passage, working as a covered street: it must be reminded that the original surroundings of Oviedo Cathedral were cluttered with houses, and the walkable areas were very narrow, so this street-like narthex provided an interesting, urbanistic solution. Initially, this narthex was going to be topped by two twin towers, but after 1507 the Oviedo episcopate decided to build only a tower, which would be erected over the narthex's Southern gate: despite traditional accounts, this decision did not respond to a lack of funds, because the cathedral was actually a well-financed workshop. The erection of a huge, single bell tower instead of two smaller twin towers, was a popular solution during the Late Middle Ages in places like Southern Germany, Switzerland and the Atlantic coast of France. Oviedo Cathedral's magnificent tower was finished in 1551, after the consecutive intervention of master builders Pedro de Bueras, Pedro de la Tijera and Juan de Cerecedo "el Viejo" ("the Elder"): in 1575, lightning destroyed the original pierced spire, which was rebuilt by Rodrigo Gil de Hontañón combining Gothic and Renaissance elements. The main chapel's altarpiece, which combines statuary and paintings in a gilded, wooden frame, is an excellent example of the transition from Late Gothic to Renaissance.

During the Early Modern period, Oviedo Cathedral received new additions, including the ambulatory (designed by Juan de Naveda and built in the first years of the 17th century), as well as the sacristy and several Baroque side chapels (Capilla de Santa Bárbara, Capilla de los Vigiles, Capilla de Santa Eulalia de Mérida). In the 18th century, the adjacent church of Santa María del Rey Casto—an old, pre-Romanesque basilica built by king Alfonso II as a funerary pantheon for the Asturian monarchy—was torn down and replaced by a new, late Baroque chapel with exuberant decoration. The Early Modern period also saw the furnishing of the cathedral with several altarpieces.

The major restoration of the cathedral complex was initiated with preliminary studies in 1995 at the request of the Principality of Asturias. Under the sponsorship of the Spanish National Plan for Cathedrals (Spanish: Plan National de Catedrales), the complex was restored from 1998 to 2002 for a total budget of €764.62355.

== Cámara Santa ==
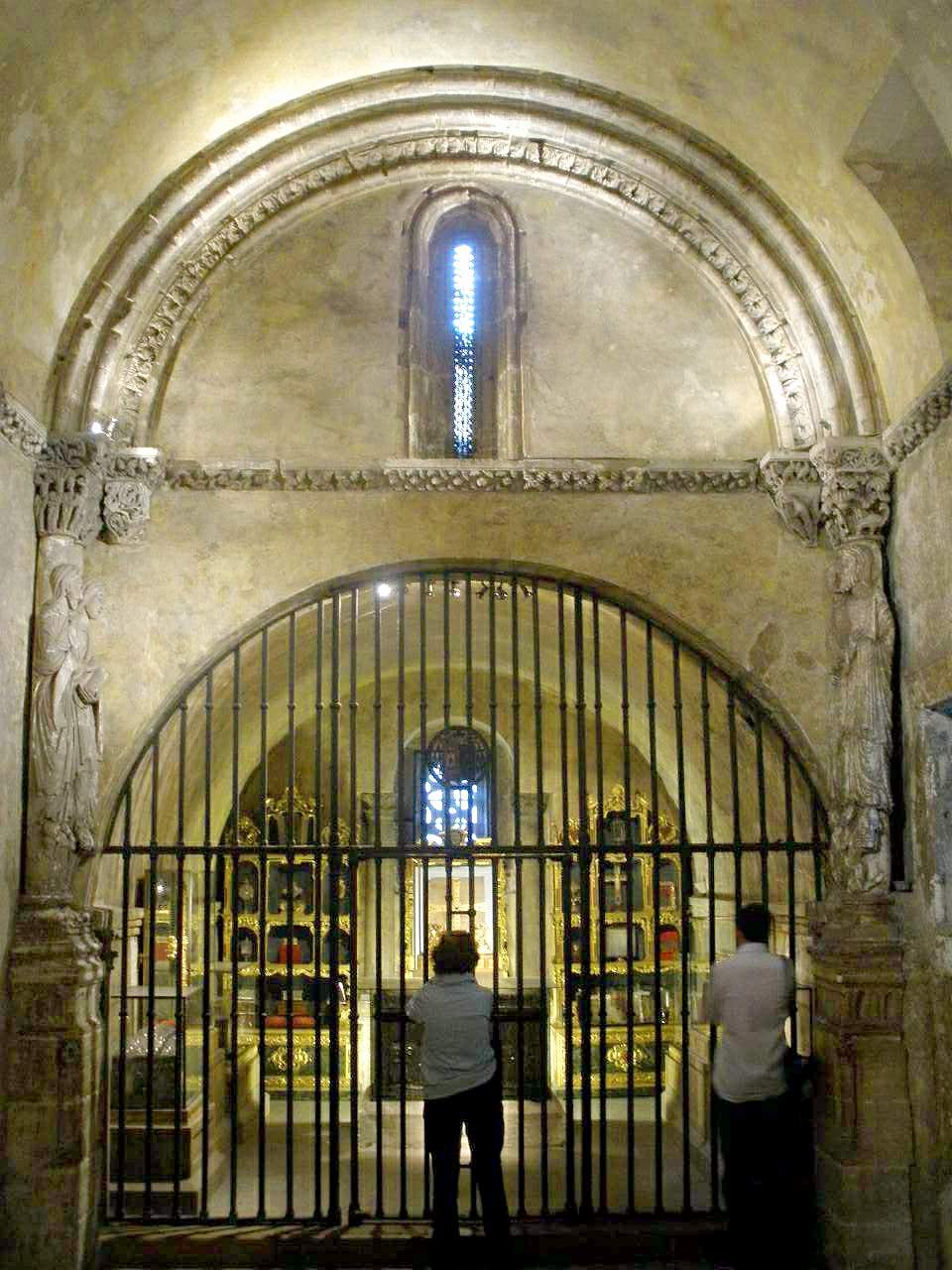
Cámara Santa, UNESCO World Heritage

The cathedral was also called Sancta Ovetensis; owing to quantity and quality of relics contained in the Cámara Santa (English: Holy Chamber). The Holy Chamber is the only surviving portion of the ancient high-medieval complex. It was built to keep such relics and treasures associated with the Asturian monarchy as the Cross of the Angels, Victory Cross, and the Agate Box or Agate Casket.

The chief feature of the cathedral is the "Camara Santa", with its venerable relics. Bishop Pelagius relates that the Agate Box, a coffer made by the disciples of the Apostles and containing the most precious relics of the Holy City, was taken from Jerusalem to Africa, and after residing in several locations was finally placed at Oviedo by Alfonso II. In the 16th century, Bishop Cristóbal de Sandoval y Rojas wished to open it, but could not, being overcome with religious fear.

== Burials ==
- Saint Eulogius of Córdoba
- Fruela I of Asturias
- Munia of Álava, wife of Fruela I
- Teresa Ansúrez, wife of Sancho I of León
- Alfonso III of Asturias
- Jimena of Pamplona, wife of Alfonso III of Asturias
- Saint Leocadia, relics later moved from Oviedo
- Saint Pelagius of Córdoba (912–925), a boy martyr
- García I of León
- Ordoño I of Asturias
- Ramiro I of Asturias

== See also ==
- Asturian architecture
- Catholic Church in Spain
- Sudarium of Oviedo
- Roman Catholic Archdiocese of Oviedo
