= Altmünster, Mainz =

Coordinates: 49°59′56″N 8°15′47″E

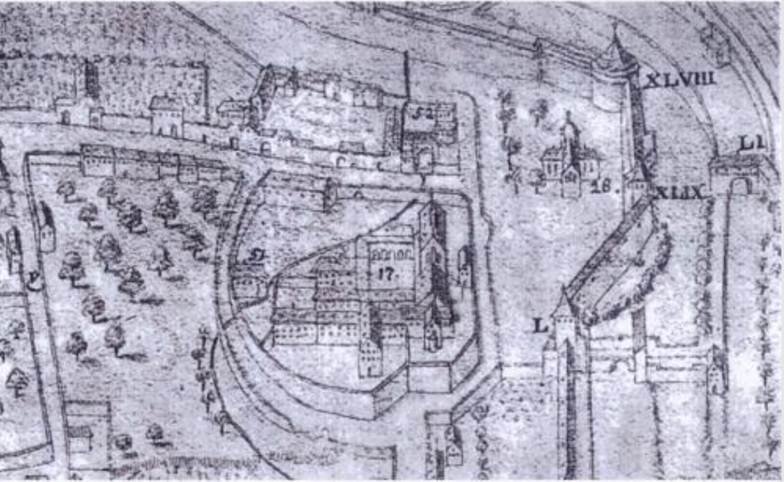
Altmünster Abbey depicted on Gottfried Mascops map of Mainz 1575

The Altmünster abbey near Mainz, Germany, was reputedly founded by Saint Bilihildis (d. 734), who served as the first abbess; however, it may well be a 7th-century foundation. Though founded as a Benedictine abbey, it adopted the rule of the Cistercians in the 13th century. It was dissolved during the secularization of the 18th century, and the abbey buildings were demolished. The abbey church was given to a Protestant congregation in the early 19th century; it was destroyed during World War II but rebuilt and reconsecrated.

== History ==
According to a foundation charter (considered a forgery by many scholars), the abbey was founded on 22 April 635. This document is riddled with inaccuracies and anachronisms, and the sole remaining copy dates from the 12th century; estimates of the date of the original on which it may have been based range from the early 8th to the 9th century. Originally following the Rule of Saint Benedict, in 1243 it became Cistercian.

The abbey was dissolved on 15 November 1781. Its accounts, with those of two other wealthy Mainz abbeys (the Carthusian Priory and the Abbey of the Rich Clares), went into a fund controlled by the University of Mainz. Some of the remaining nuns joined the Cistercian Weißfrauenkloster, others the Dalheimkloster, both in Mainz.

== Later uses ==
In 1802 the abbey church, the Altmünsterkirche, was given over to a Protestant congregation. The building was destroyed by Allied bombs during World War II; it was rebuilt in the 1950s and re-consecrated in 1960.
