= Bilihildis of Altmünster =

Benedictine abbess and Frankish saint

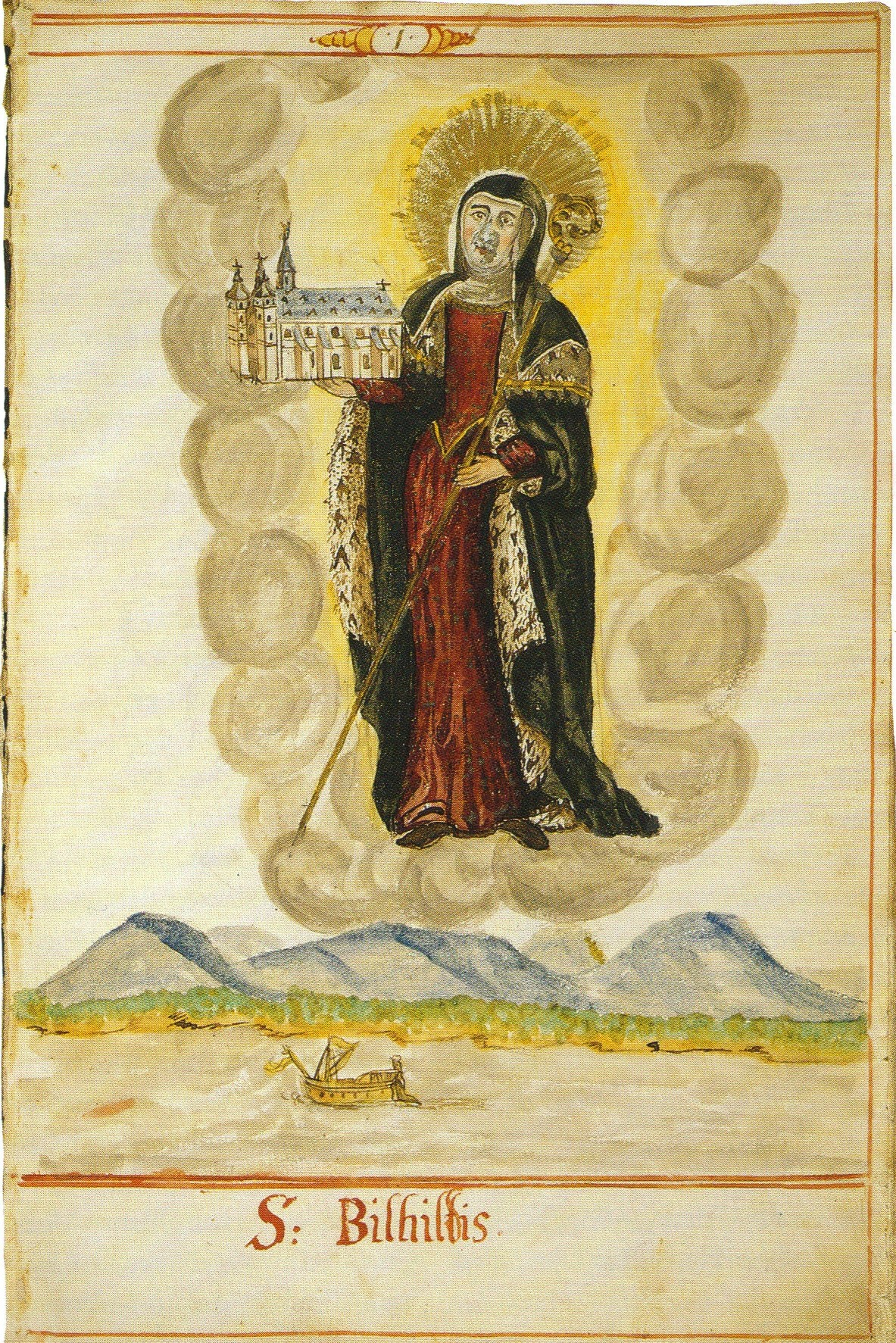

Bilhild (also spelled Bilihilt, Bilihildis, Bilehild; died 734) was a Frankish noblewoman, remembered as the founder and abbess of the monastery of Altmünster near Mainz, and venerated locally as a saint, on Nov. 27.

== Biography ==
The biography of Saint Bilihildis is difficult to establish; firm evidence of her existence only goes back to the 12th century, according to Andreas Meier. Her vitae date from after 1060 and, in the absence of other evidence, form the basis for her biography. There are five distinct vitae, the most important of which are:

- a short, Latin version in prose, preserved in two manuscripts from the 13th and the 14th century
- a longer prose version likewise preserved in two manuscripts, from the 14th and the 15th century (possibly modeled on hagiographical texts on Frankish queen and saint Radegund, and certainly indebted to vitae Kiliani)
- a group of locally preserved texts in the vernacular
- a metrical (Latin) version, the Vita metrica auctore Herbelone, first printed at the end of the 18th century and based on a now-lost manuscript.

Brigitte Flug considers the short Latin prose version (written in the Merovingian style) to be the earliest, though she denies it could have been written within living memory.

=== Hagiography ===
Bilihildis was born in the 7th century in Hocheim, typically identified as modern-day Veitshöchheim near Würzburg, Bavaria, the child of Count Jberin and his wife Mathilda. According to Alfred Wendehorst, however, what is meant is probably Hochheim am Main, with the location in Würzburg and its East-Frankish connections a later "explanation" for the monastery's foundation. Her 11th-century hagiography reports that she was forced to flee the invading Huns and was moved to Würzburg, where she was raised as a Christian. Though she wanted to devote her life to Christ, her parents forced her to marry a pagan Frankish duke named Hetan around 672, whom she loved but was unable to convert. It is not clear whether this is Hedan I or Hedan II. Hetan was called to battle and was killed; during his absence Bilihild saw an opportunity for a religious life and traveled by ship to Mainz, where she asked for and received permission from the local bishop, her uncle Sigibert (a misreading for Rigibert, bishop of Mainz), to start a foundation for religious women. She started this foundation using her considerable wealth (having sold her possessions in Hochheim) to support it. This was the beginning of the Altmünster monastery of which she was the first abbess. She was baptized later in life. She died on 27 November 734 and was buried in the abbey church; her grave soon gave off a sweet aroma and many miracles happened there.

=== Commentary ===
This account, which is based on the short Latin prose version, is embellished with various details in other versions; the German version adds local geographical and historical detail. Such additional detail includes her maiden name, Mathildis, and the gift of a sudarium ("sweat cloth"), supposedly a cloth used to cover Jesus's face after the crucifixion. This sudarium was given by a queen Imnechild (in a different redaction, Kunegundis) and has been venerated in Altmünster since the 15th century.

Bilihildis's hagiography follows a traditional (Merovingian) scheme common for saints like her since the 6th century: the saint is religious from an early age, exhibits humility and abstinence, is forced into marriage, flees, and ends up founding an abbey. Sainthood is proven by the sweet odor of the dead body and the miracles after death. Flug does not deny the possibility that Bilihildis was already considered a saint during life or shortly thereafter, but considers it unlikely that a vita was written so early, considering mistakes such as the bishop's name; Flug proposes that the author did not know Bilihildis and her life, and probably misread the name in the foundational deed for the monastery.

As for "Hetan", identification with Hedan I ("the elder") is difficult given the time frame; since he died (according to Hubert Mordek) after 676, which would mean the founding of the abbey took place when Bilihildis was in her seventies, an unlikely proposition. For Hedan II the problem is that he was Christian and had a wife, who was proven to exist in 704 and in 716/717.

== Historical traces and legacy ==
The word/name "bilihilt" occurs in a 5th/6th manuscript containing texts by Priscillian, which is identified with the Bilihildis who founded Altmünster. A 16th-century missal from Mainz (containing a calendar with Rhenish saints) has a "Mass from the feast of Saint Bilhildis"; the manuscript was acquired by the J. Paul Getty Museum in 1986. German poet Alois Henninger, a prolific writer of religious narrative poems, dedicated a lengthy poem to Bilihildis in his Nassau in seinen sagen, geschichten und liedern fremder und eigner dichtung (1845); consisting of eighteen six-line stanzas, it praised her eternal beauty and steadfast devotion to God.

German Protestant theologian Johannes Heinrich August Ebrard wrote a biography of Bilihildis, which was translated (or, "retold") in English by Julie Sutter and published by the Religious Tract Society, with a particular focus on the influence of Iroscottish Christianity.
