= 8th century in architecture =

== Buildings and structures ==
=== Buildings ===
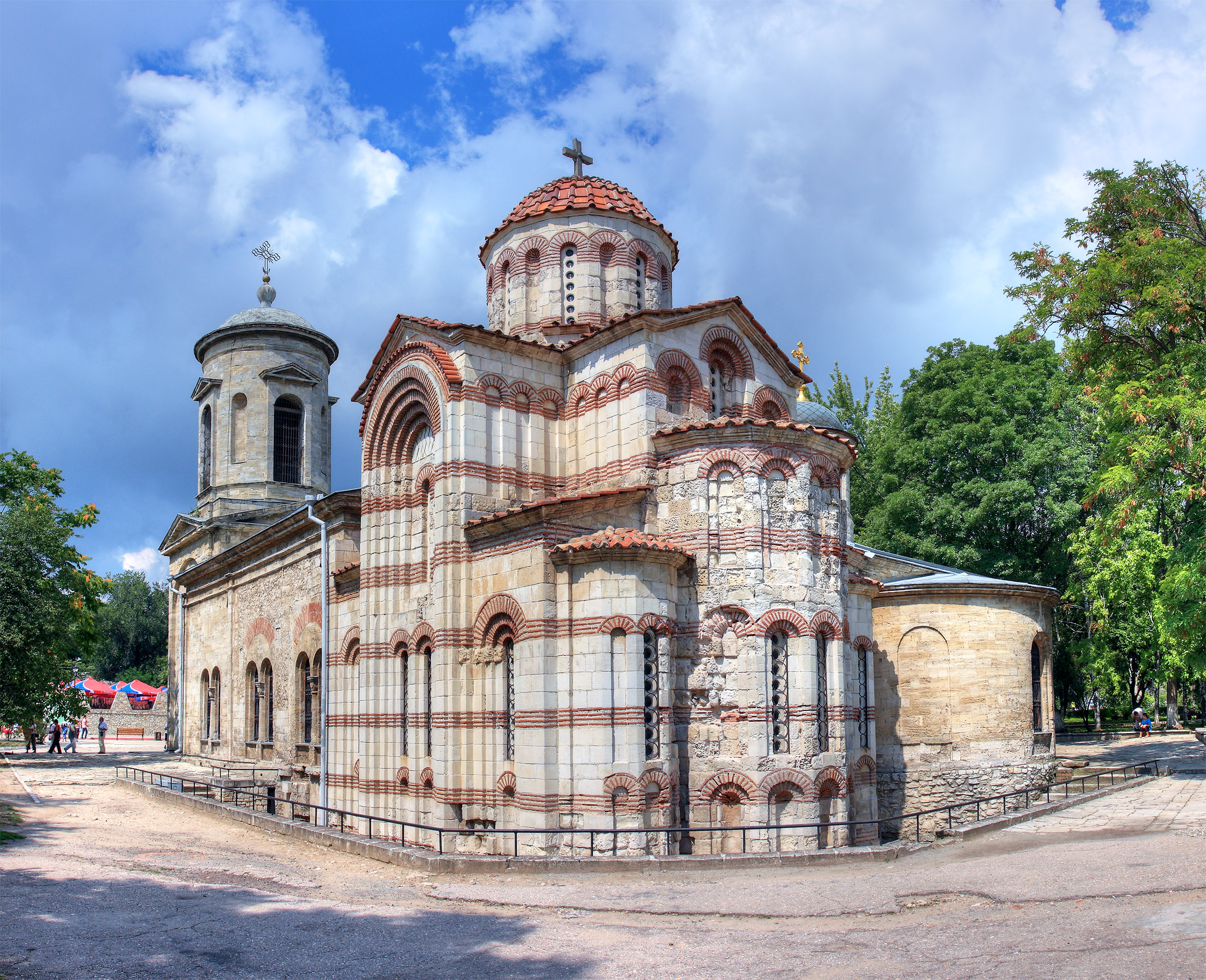
Church of St John the Baptist, Kerch

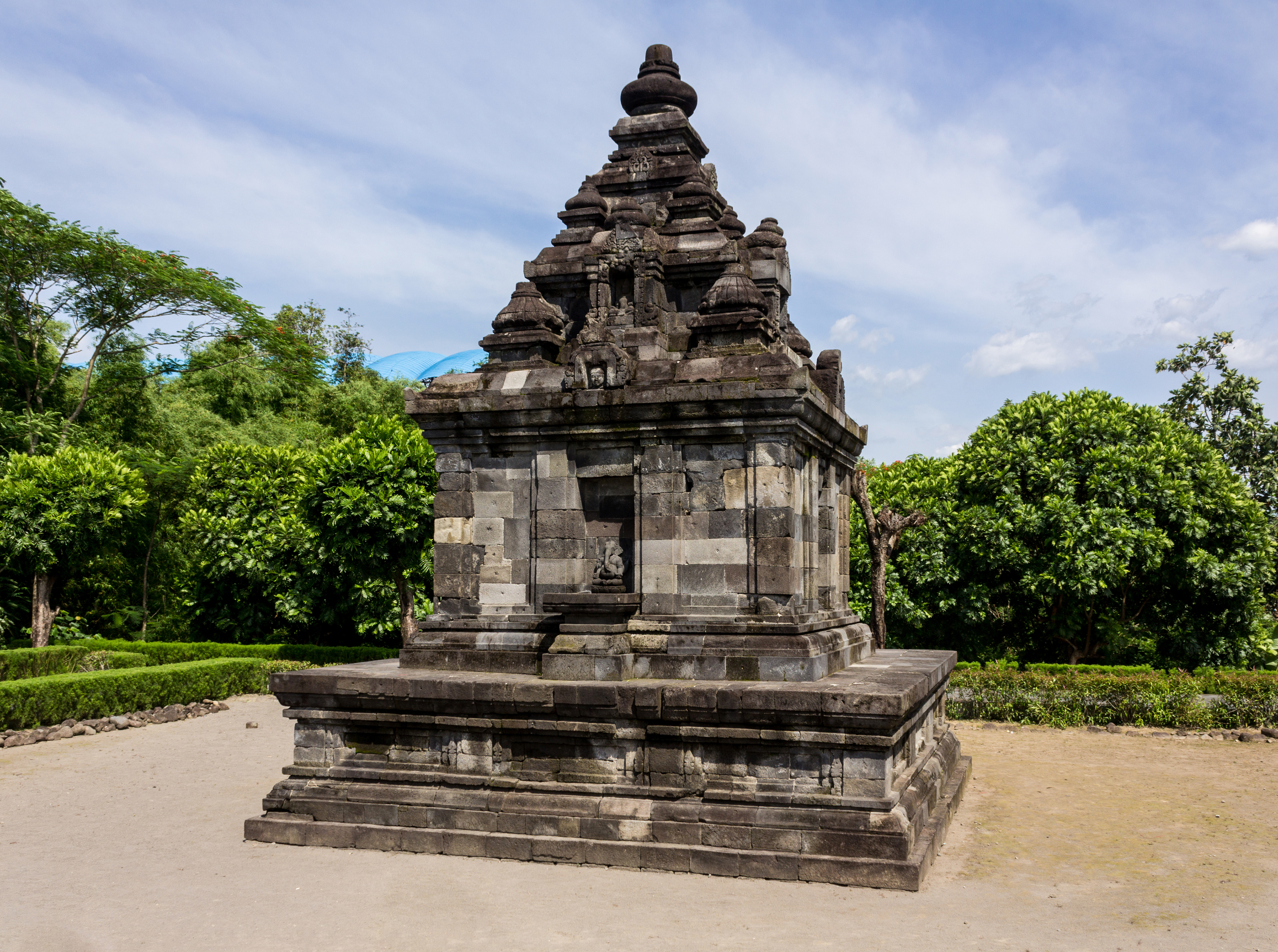
Gebang Hindu temple at Yogyakarta, Java

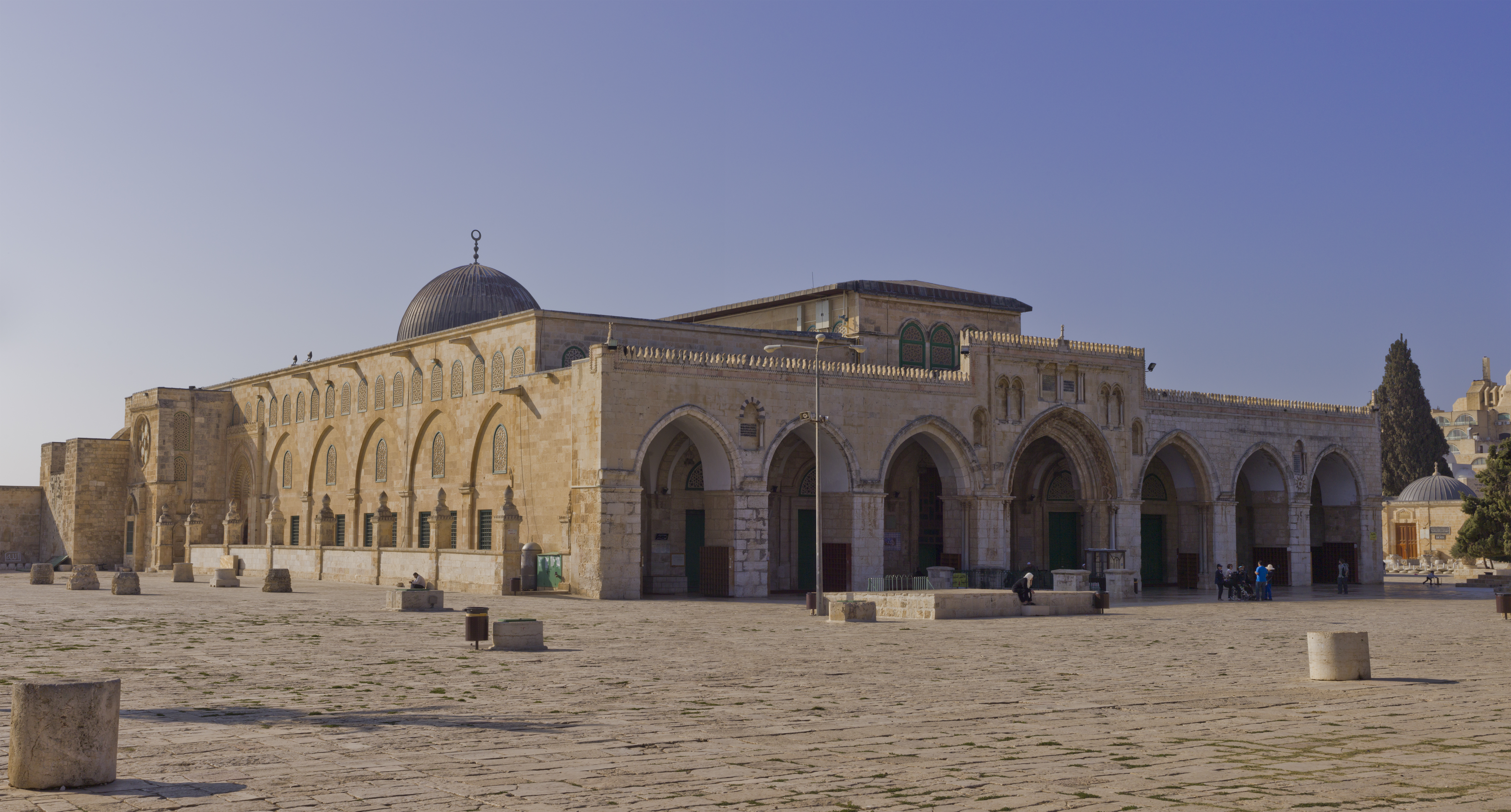
Jami Al-Aqsa in Jerusalem

- 709 – Jami Al-Aqsa first built in Jerusalem, Umayyad Empire (begun in 707).
- 709 – Small Wild Goose Pagoda in China is completed.
- before 710 – Qasr Kharana castle built in the Umayyad Empire.
- 710 – The capital of Japan is moved from Fujiwara-kyō to Heijō-kyō (平城京) (Nara).
- 711 – Fujiwara-kyō is destroyed by a fire.
- c. 711 – Hōryū-ji temple reconstructed in Ikaruga, Japan.
- 714 – Umayyad Mosque built in Damascus, capital of the Umayyad Empire. Begun in 707.
- 715 – Umayyad city of Anjar built in Lebanon.
- c. 715 – Qasr Amra castle built in the Umayyad Empire.
- c. 717–757 – Church of St John the Baptist, Kerch in Crimea is constructed.
- 721 – Al-Omari Mosque (Bosra) completed in Umayyad Syria.
- c. 730–800 – Gebang Hindu temple at Yogyakarta on Java is built.
- 739 – A Benedictine monastery is built adjoining the Basilica of Sant'Ambrogio in Milan.
- c. 744 – Construction begun on the Mshatta Umayyad Palace.
- c. 744 – Umayyad palace of Khirbat al-Mafjar near Jericho, Palestine built.
- 746 – Castle of Gormaz built in Spain.
- 750s – Belfry of Old St. Peter's Basilica in Rome constructed.
- 751
  - Bulguksa of Korea is expanded.
  - Seokguram of Korea is constructed.
  - Tōdai-ji (東大寺) temple in Heijō-kyō (Nara), Japan is completed (the modern-day building is a 1709 reconstruction).
- 755 – Hieroglyphic staircase finished in the Maya city of Copán.
- 759 – Tōshōdai-ji (唐招提寺) temple founded in Heijō-kyō (Nara), Japan.
- 762 – Medinat as-Salam (modern-day Baghdad) founded as the capital of the Abbasid Caliphate.
- 765 – Saidai-ji (西大寺) temple is founded in Heijō-kyō (Nara), Japan.
- 768 – Kasuga Shrine (春日大社) first founded in Heijō-kyō (Nara), Japan.
- 770 – Rock-carved Kailash Temple in Ellora, India commissioned by Rashtrakuta King Krishna I.
- 771 – Jami Al-Aqsa in Jerusalem rebuilt by the Abbasid caliph Al Mansur.
- 774
  - Lorsch Abbey consecrated.
  - Construction of Charlemagne's palace at Ingelheim am Rhein begun.

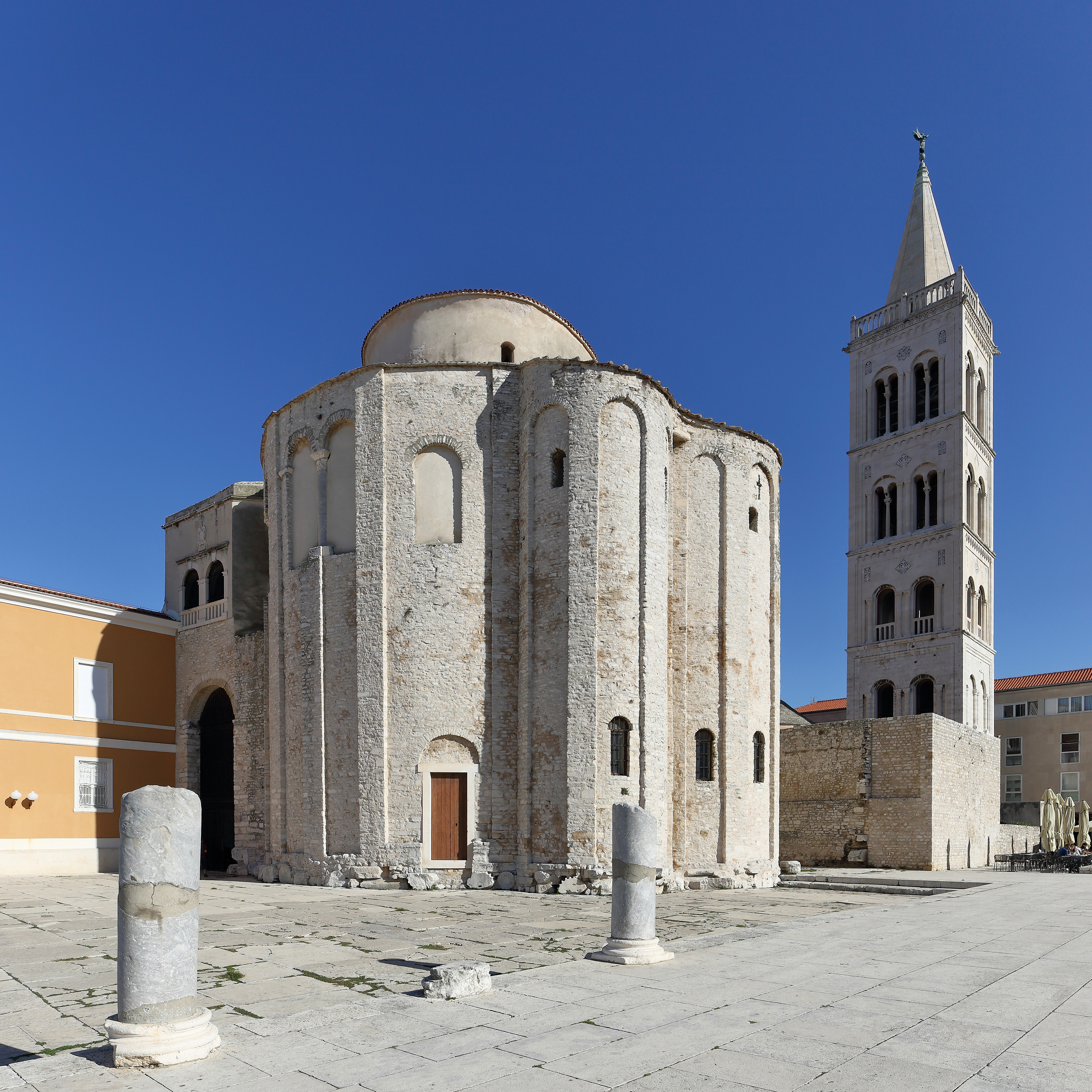
Church of St Donatus in Zadar, Croatia

- 775 – Basilica of St Denis near Paris is consecrated.
- c. 775–778 – Al-Ukhaidir Fortress built in Mesopotamia, Abbasid Caliphate.
- By 778 – Kalasan temple on Java completed. The adjacent Sari temple is built about the same time.
- 781 – San Vicente of Oviedo church, first monument built in Oviedo, Kingdom of Asturias.
- 784–6 – Aljama Mosque (Mosque of Córdoba (Mezquita de Córdoba)) built in the Emirate of Córdoba, designed by Sidi ben Ayub for Emir Abd al-Rahman I.
- 786 – Aachen Cathedral begun.
- 787 – Construction of the first Würzburg Cathedral (building no longer existing).
- 790s – Villa and oratory at Germigny-des-Prés begun.
- 799 – Lyon Cathedral begun.
- second half of the 8th century; Church of St Donatus, located in Zadar, Croatia.

== Births ==
- 742 – Odo of Metz, Carolingian architect (died 814)

== See also ==
- 7th century in architecture
- 9th century in architecture
- Timeline of architecture
