= 4th century in architecture =

== Events ==
- 313 – Emperor Constantine issues the Edict of Milan, legislating toleration of Christian worship in the Roman Empire. The 4th century sees the construction of many churches, especially in Rome (see below), and in the eastern empire.

== Buildings and structures ==
=== Buildings ===
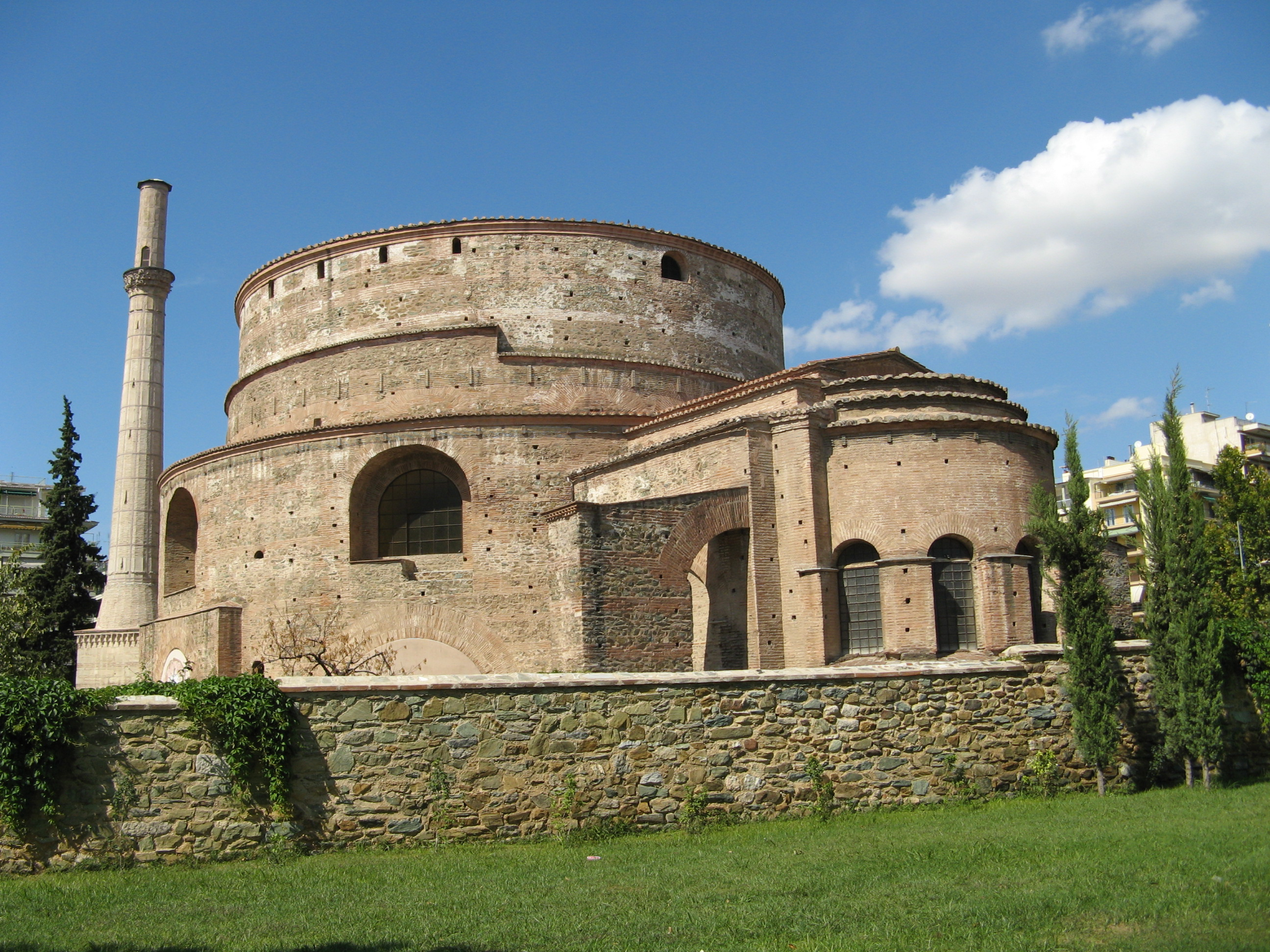
Rotunda of Galerius in Thessaloniki

- Early – Church of St. George, Sofia (Serdica) is probably completed.
- 303 – Arch of Galerius in Thessaloniki (Macedonia) is dedicated.
- 306 – Rotunda of Galerius in Thessaloniki is built.
- c.310 – Aula Palatina (Basilica of Constantine) at Trier is built.
- 312–315 – Arch of Constantine in Rome is built.
- c.326–380 – Church of the Holy Sepulchre in Jerusalem (including Anastasis Rotunda).
- 368 – Valens Aqueduct in Constantinople is completed.
- From 382 – San Nazaro in Brolo (Basilica Apostolorum) in Milan is begun by Ambrose.
- 386 – Basilica of Sant'Ambrogio (Basilica Martyrum) in Milan, built by Ambrose, is consecrated.
- c.390s – Kasagh Basilica in Armenia is built.
- 393 – The Forum of Theodosius in Constantinople, reconstructed over the Forum Tauri, is inaugurated.
- Dadhimati Mata Temple in Rajasthan is built.

=== Churches in Rome ===
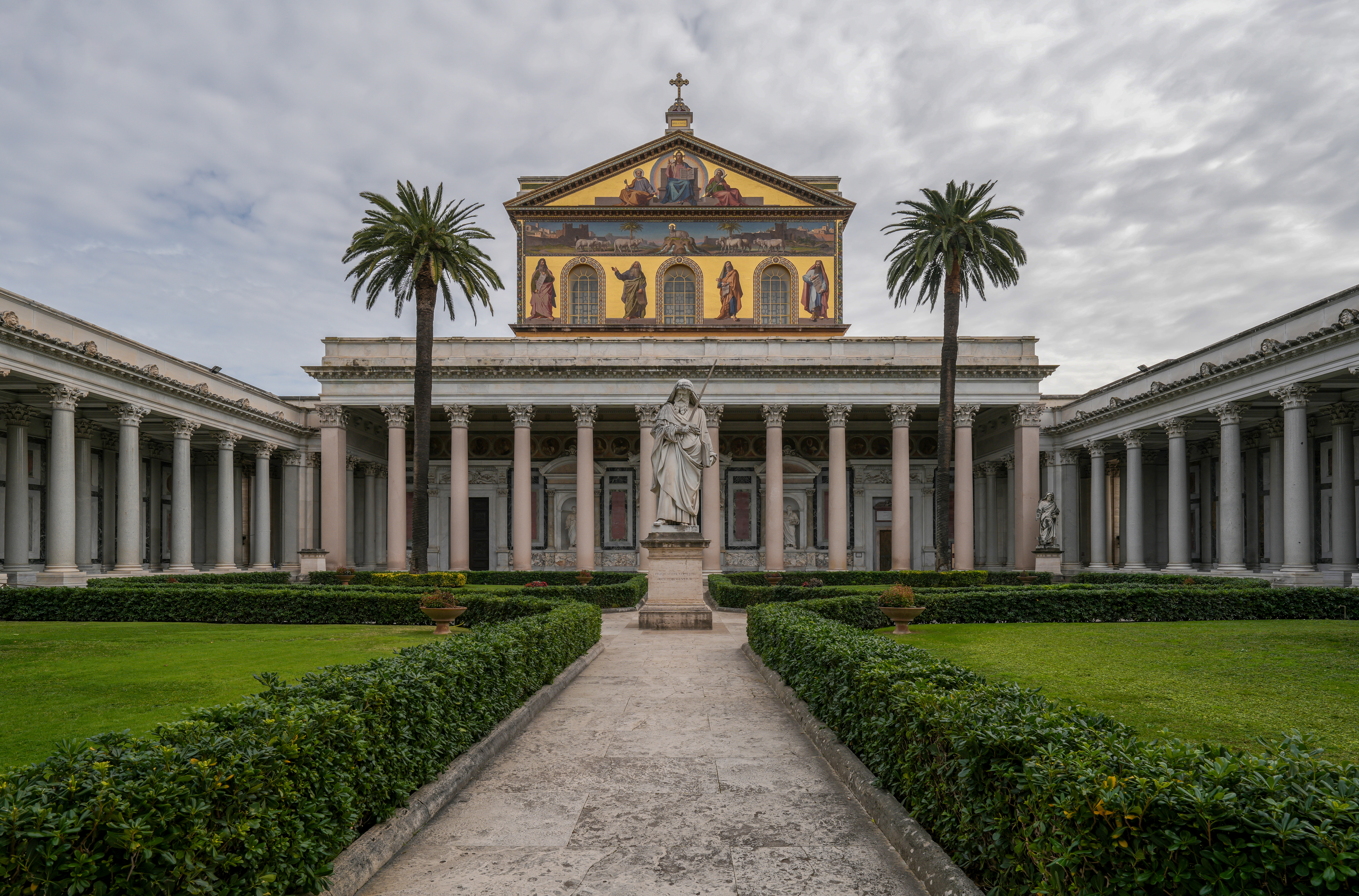
Basilica of Saint Paul Outside the Walls, Rome

- San Marcello al Corso (309)
- Santi Quattro Coronati (314)
- Old St. Peter's Basilica (324)
- Basilica di San Giovanni in Laterano (324)
- Santa Croce in Gerusalemme (325)
- Santa Susanna (330)
- Basilica di San Marco (336)
- Basilica di Sant'Anastasia al Palatino (early 4th century)
- Santa Costanza (c. 350)
- Santa Maria in Trastevere (early 4th century)
- Santi Nereo e Achilleo (before 377)
- San Lorenzo in Damaso (380)
- Basilica of Saint Paul Outside the Walls (Basilica di San Paolo fuori le Mura) (386)
- Santi Giovanni e Paolo (398)
- San Sisto Vecchio (late 4th century)
- Basilica di San Clemente
- San Lorenzo in Lucina
- Santi Marcellino e Pietro al Laterano
- Santa Pudenziana (4th century)
- San Sebastiano fuori le mura
- Basilica di San Vitale (400)

== See also ==
- 3rd century in architecture
- 5th century in architecture
- Timeline of architecture
