= 5th century in architecture =

== Events ==
- 447: November 6 – An earthquake levels large parts of the Theodosian Wall of Constantinople. Repairs, under the direction of urban prefect Cyrus of Floros, are effected within 60 days.

== Buildings and structures ==
=== Buildings ===
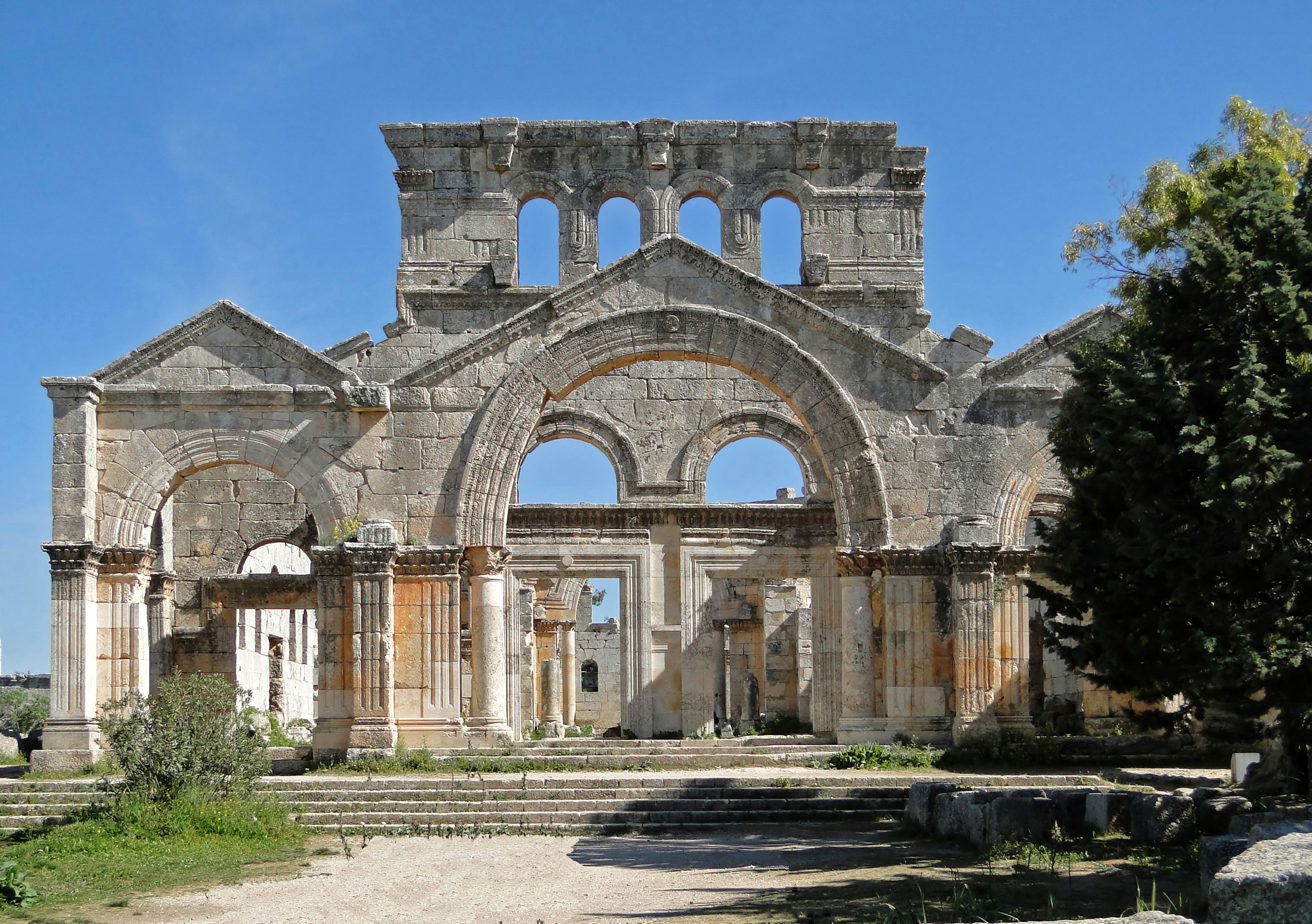
Church of Saint Simeon Stylites in Syria

- 408 – 413 The Theodosian Wall, is built, as a fortification of Constantinople, running from the Sea of Marmara on the south, to the suburb of Blachernae, near the Golden Horn, on the north.
- 420s – San Giovanni Evangelista, Ravenna built.
- 422–432 – Santa Sabina all'Aventino Basilica in Rome built.
- 427 – Anak Palace of Goguryeo built.
- 430s – Baptistry of San Giovanni in Laterano, Rome reconstructed.
- 430s – Santa Maria Maggiore, Rome reconstructed.
- By c. 450 – Baptistry of Neon completed.
- c. 450–470 – Church of the Acheiropoietos in Thessaloniki (Macedonia) built.
- 460s – Christian basilica at Qalb Loze in Syria (Byzantine Empire) built.
- 462 – Monastery of Stoudios in Constantinople established.
- 475 – Church of Saint Simeon Stylites in Syria (Byzantine Empire) dedicated.
- 478–493 – Bolnisi Sioni basilica in Georgia built.
- c. 480 – Deir Turmanin monastery in Syria (Byzantine Empire) built.
- 483–484 – Etchmiadzin Cathedral in Armenia built.
- 490 – Arian Baptistry, Ravenna begun.
- 490s – Original basilica of the Abbey of Saint-Germain d'Auxerre in Burgundy built.

== Births ==
- 474 – Anthemius of Tralles, architect and mathematician (d. 534)

== See also ==
- 4th century in architecture
- 6th century in architecture
- Timeline of architecture
