= 6th century in architecture =

== Events ==
- 550s – Procopius writes The Buildings of Justinian (Ancient Greek: Περὶ Κτισμάτων Perì Ktismáton, Latin: De Aedificiis, "On Buildings").

== Buildings and structures ==
=== Buildings ===
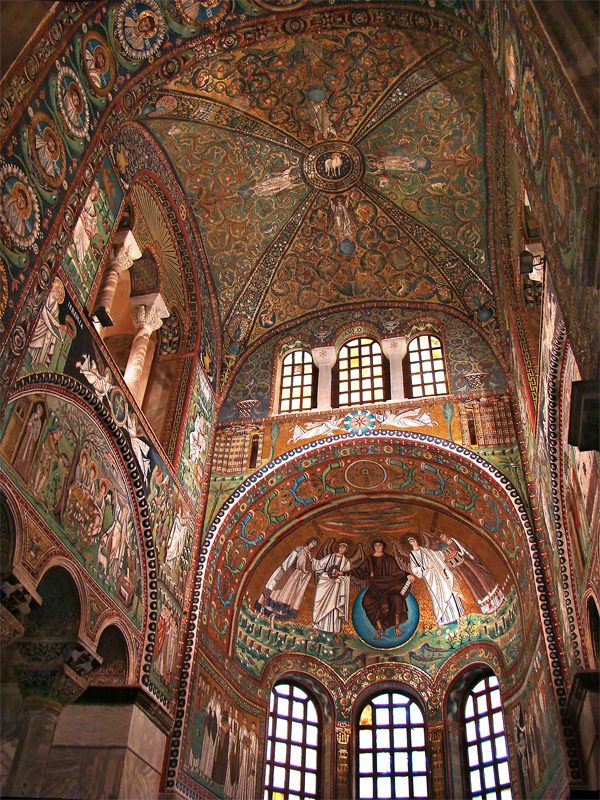
Presbytery, Basilica of San Vitale, Ravenna.

- About 500 – Arian Baptistry and Archbishop's Chapel, Ravenna completed.
- 504 – Basilica of Sant'Apollinare Nuovo, Ravenna dedicated to Christ the Redeemer (completed about 520).
- 520 – St. Nicholas Church, Demre, Anatolia, built.
- 520s – Mausoleum of Theodoric, Ravenna completed.
- 523 – Songyue Pagoda of China completed.
- 527 to 536 – Construction of the Church of Saints Sergios and Bacchos in Constantinople.
- 527 to 548 – Construction of the Basilica of San Vitale, Ravenna, begun under the Ostrogoths and finished by the Byzantines.
- 532 to 537 – Hagia Sophia in Constantinople built by Isidore of Miletus and Anthemius of Tralles.
- After 540 – Construction of Taq-i Kisra (iwan) at Ctesiphon in the Sasanian Empire begins.
- 549 – Basilica of Sant'Apollinare in Classe near Ravenna consecrated.
- 550 – Rebuilt Church of the Holy Apostles in Constantinople, built by Anthemius of Tralles and Isidore of Miletus, dedicated.
- About 560 – First Nantes Cathedral constructed.
- 569 – Hwangnyongsa temple completed in Gyeongju, Silla.
- About 570 – Basilica of St. Sernin, Toulouse constructed.
- 582 – Daxing (大兴城) founded in China by Emperor Wen of Sui.
- 593 – Gangō-ji (元興寺) temple first built in Asuka, Japan (later moved to Nara).

== See also ==
- 5th century in architecture
- 7th century in architecture
- Timeline of architecture
