= 9th century in architecture =

== Buildings and structures ==
=== Buildings ===
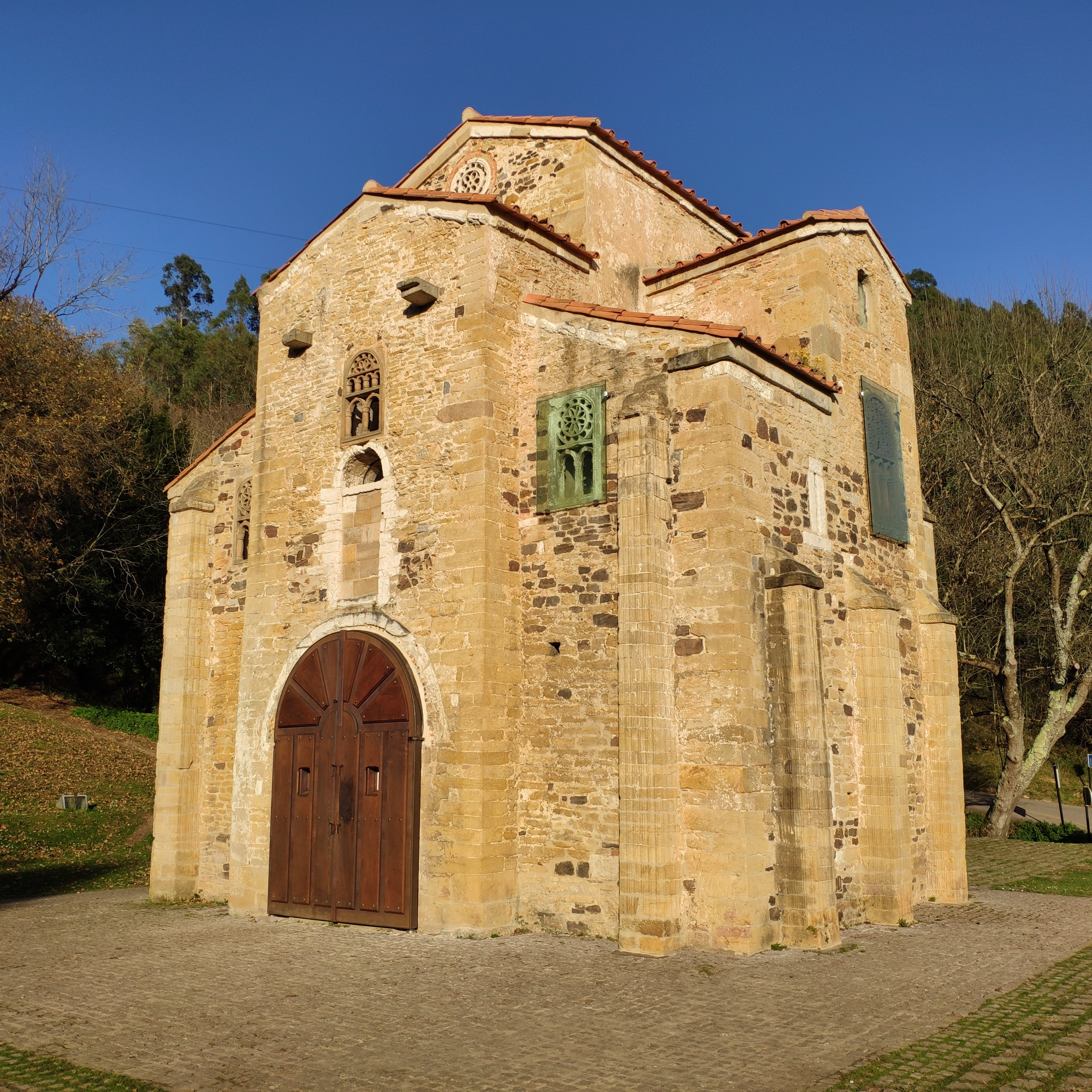
San Miguel de Lillo

- about 800 – Borobudur temple in Java completed.
- 802
  - Haeinsa of Korea, is constructed.
  - Palace of Charlemagne in Aachen, Carolingian Empire completed (begun about 790). The Palatine Chapel still stands.
  - At Oviedo in the Kingdom of Asturias
    - Cámara Santa constructed.
    - First reconstruction of Oviedo Cathedral begun by Tioda.
- 815 – Second Temple of Somnath built in the Pratihara Empire, India.
- 816 – Reims Cathedral begun.
- 810s – Chapel of San Zeno in Santa Prassede, Rome decorated.
- 818 – Old Cologne Cathedral built.
- 820s
  - Imperial Abbey of Corvey on the Weser founded.
  - Fontanella Abbey reconstructed.
- 827 – Mosque of Amr ibn al-As in Fustat, Egypt reaches its final form.
- c. 830–842 – Construction of basilica church of San Julián de los Prados in Oviedo, Kingdom of Asturias, designed by Tioda.
- 836
  - Samarra founded in Mesopotamia as the capital of the Abbasid Caliphate.
  - Great Mosque of Kairouan founded in Aghlabid Tunisia.
- 838 – Jawsaq Khakani Palace built in Samarra.
- 840s – Santa María del Naranco Hall, San Miguel de Lillo constructed.
- 840 – The main pagoda of the Three Pagodas in Dali, Yunnan, China is built.
- c. 842 – San Miguel de Lillo in Oviedo, Kingdom of Asturias is built.
- 847 – St. Peter's Basilica and Basilica of Saint Paul Outside the Walls in Rome partly rebuilt.

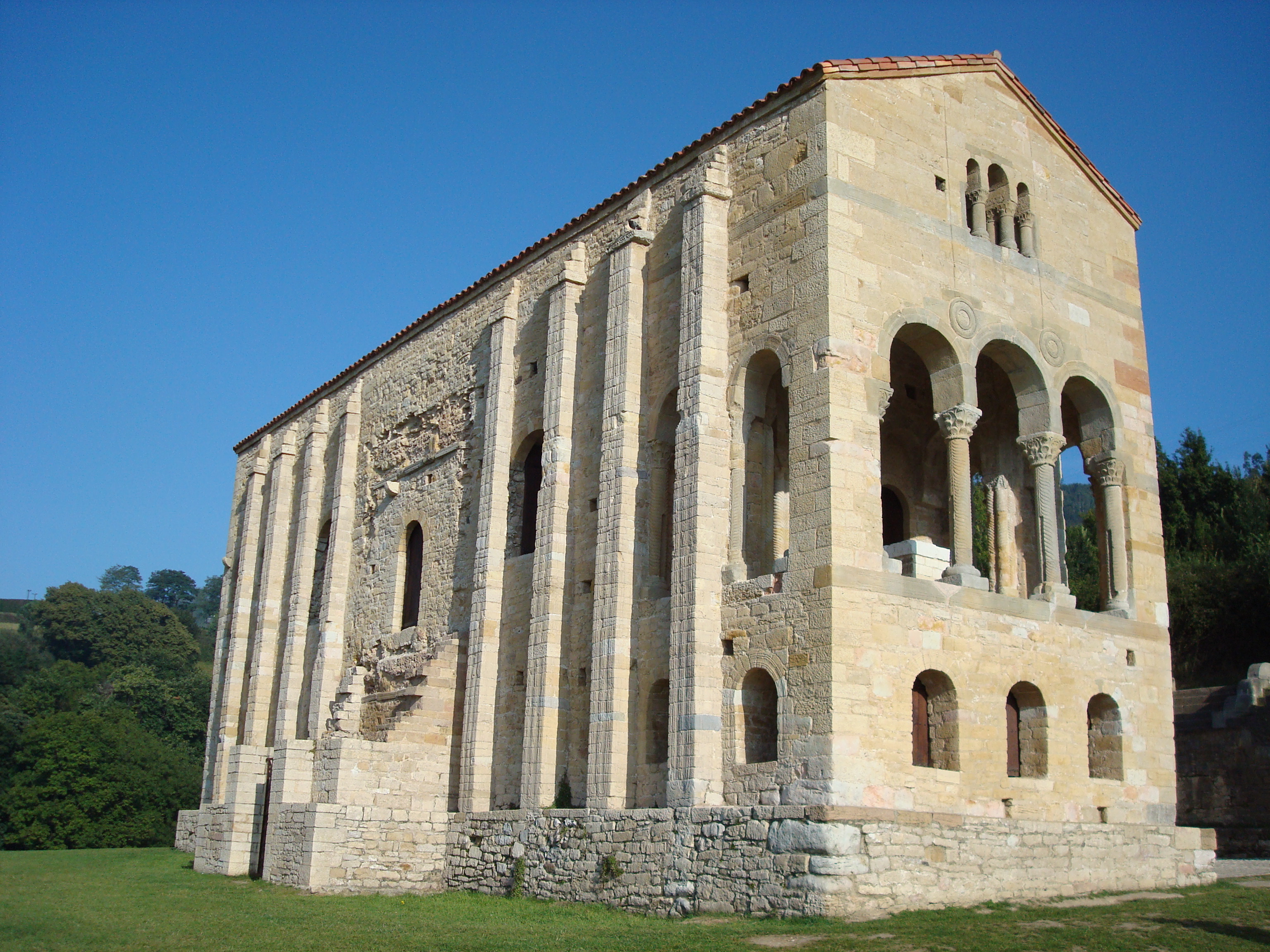
Santa María del Naranco in Oviedo, Spain

- 848
  - First enlargement of the Great Mosque of Cordoba, in the Emirate of Cordoba finished (begun in 832).
  - Santa María del Naranco built in Oviedo as part of a palace complex of Ramiro I King of Asturias
- c. 850 – Prambanan Temple built in Java.
- 851 – Great Mosque of Sousse built in Aghlabid Tunisia.
- 852
  - Great Mosque of Samarra and Malwiya Minaret completed (begun in 848).
  - Hildesheim Cathedral begun.
- c. 854 – Balkuwara Palace of Caliph Al-Mutawakkil built in Samarra.
- 855 – Construction of the second Würzburg Cathedral (building no longer existing).
- 858 – Invading Vikings set fire to the earliest church on the site of Chartres Cathedral, necessitating its reconstruction.
- 859 – Halberstadt Cathedral constructed.
- 861 – Abu Dolaf Mosque built in Samarra (begun in 859).
- 862 – Reims Cathedral constructed.
- 864 – Cathedral of Santa Maria Assunta on Torcello partly rebuilt.
- 869 – City walls of Dijon, Le Mans and Tours reconstructed.
- c. 870 – Church of St. Apostles Peter and Paul in Serbia is reconstructed.
- 873 – Imperial Abbey of Corvey begun; church westwork completed c. 885.
- 875 – Great Mosque of Kairouan in Aghlabid Tunisia reaches its current aspect.
- c. 875 – The Great Basilica of Pliska, capital of the First Bulgarian Empire is finished.
- 879
  - Mosque of Ibn Tulun, Fustat, Tulunid Egypt finished (begun in 876; consecrated 884).
  - Preah Ko, first temple built in the Khmer Empire capital of Hariharalaya.

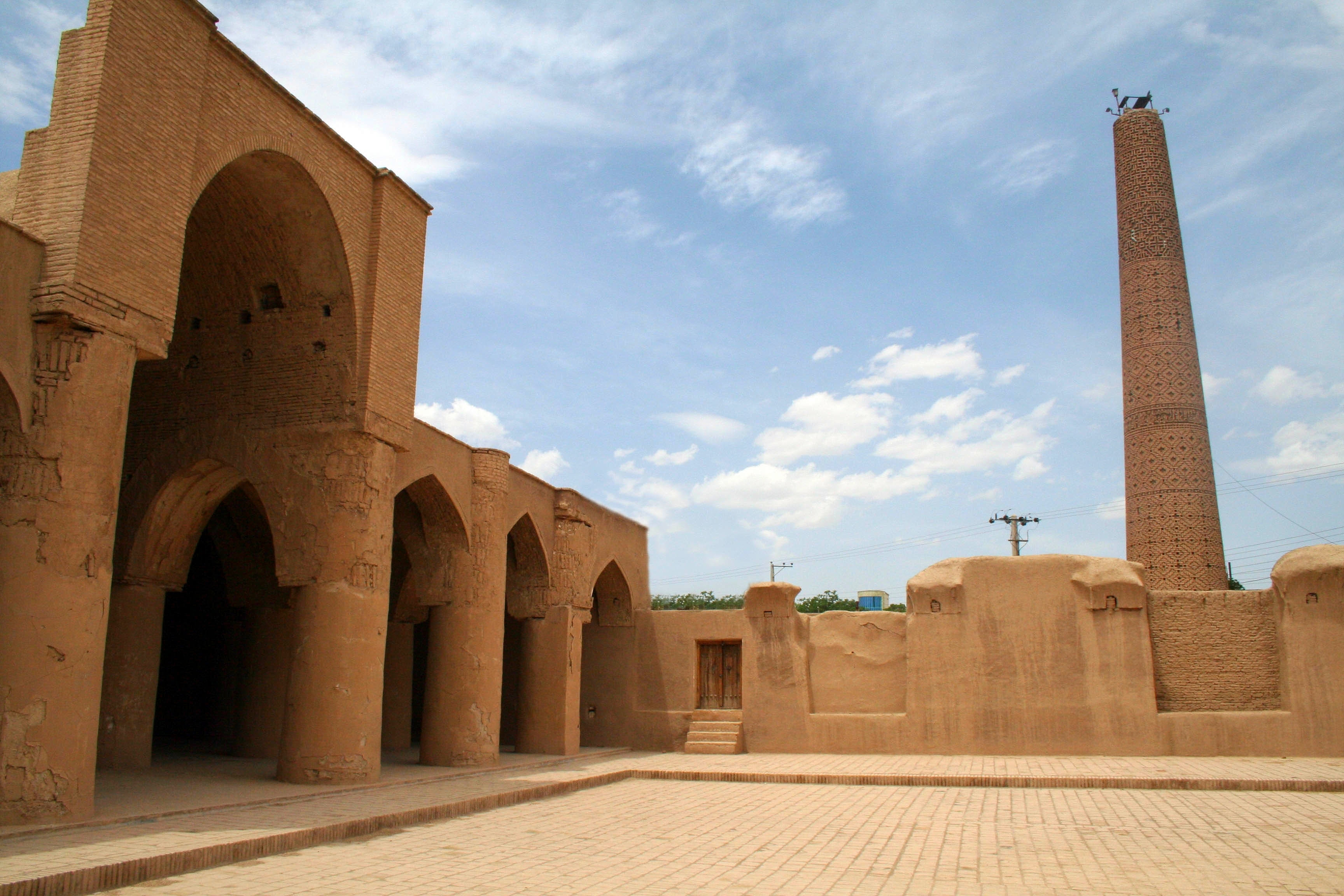
Tarikhaneh Temple in Iran built in 880.

- 880
  - The oldest Islamic contraction in Iran, the Tarikhaneh Temple (mosque) in Damghan, is built.
  - Nea Ekklesia church in Constantinople consecrated.
- 881 – Bakong, first temple mountain built in Hariharalaya.
- c. 883–902 – Shankaragaurishvara Temple in Kashmir built.
- 885 – Chausath Yogini temple is built in Khajuraho, Chandela kingdom.
- After 887 – St Mark's Campanile in Venice begun as a watch tower.
- 893 – Lolei temple in Hariharalaya built.
- 897 – Reconstruction of Nantes Cathedral begun.
- 9th century
  - Basilica of Sant'Ambrogio in Milan – the right bell-tower; known as "dei Monaci" ("bell tower of the monks"), is constructed.
  - Derawar Fort in Bahawalpur, Punjab built.
  - Banyunibo Buddhist temple in Java is constructed.
  - Church of Holy Trinity, Split (Croatian: Crkva sv. Trojstva) in Split, Croatia.
  - Church of the Holy Cross, Nin (Croatian: Crkva svetog Križa) in Nin, Croatia.
  - Fortified Church of the Saintes Maries de la Mer in Provence.
- Late 9th century – La Foncalada fountain in Oviedo, Asturias constructed.

== Deaths ==
- 814 – Odo of Metz, Carolingian architect (born 742)

== See also ==
- 8th century in architecture
- 10th century in architecture
- Timeline of architecture
