= 10th century in architecture =

== Buildings and structures ==
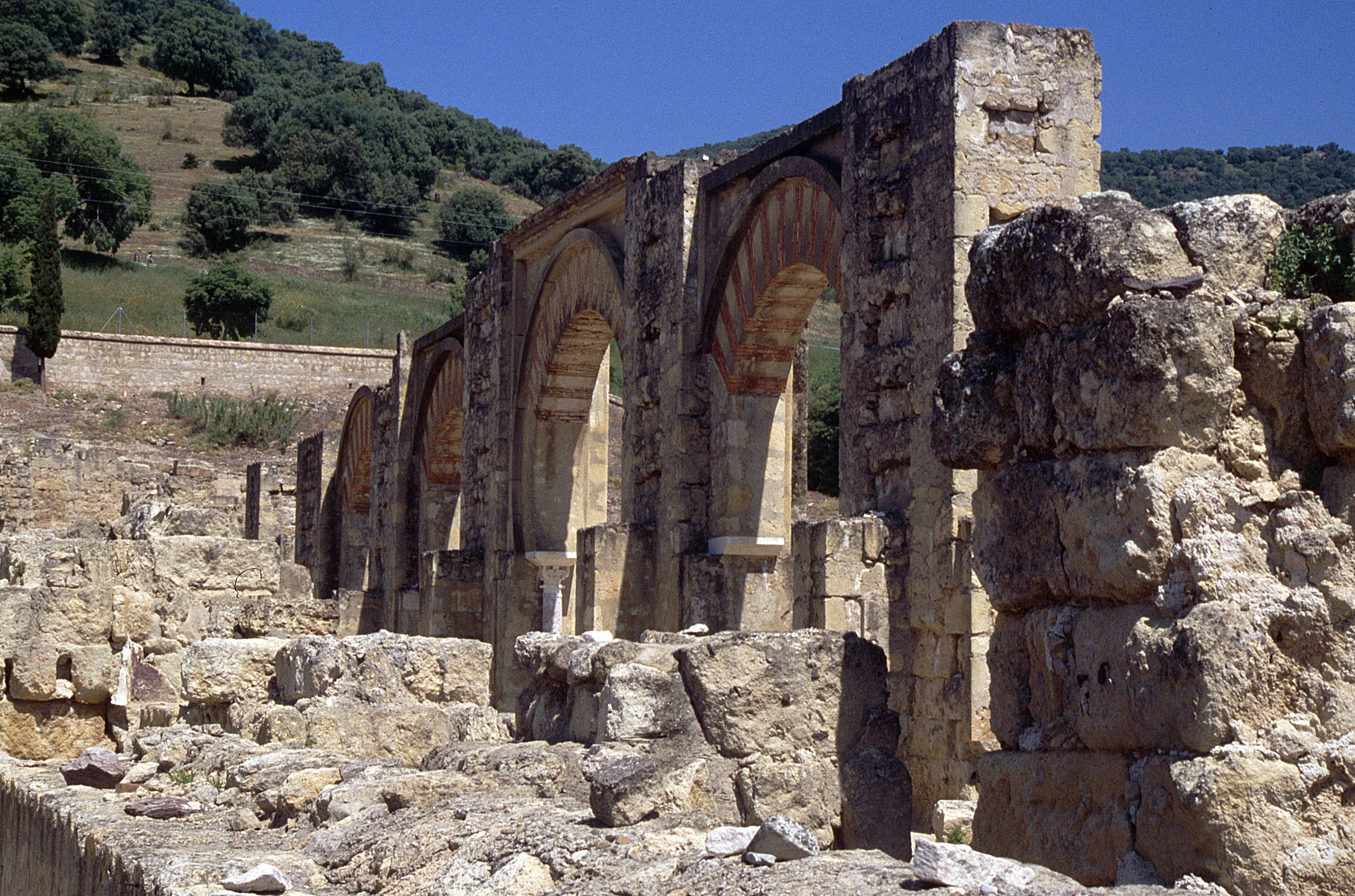
Medina Azahara in Córdoba, Spain

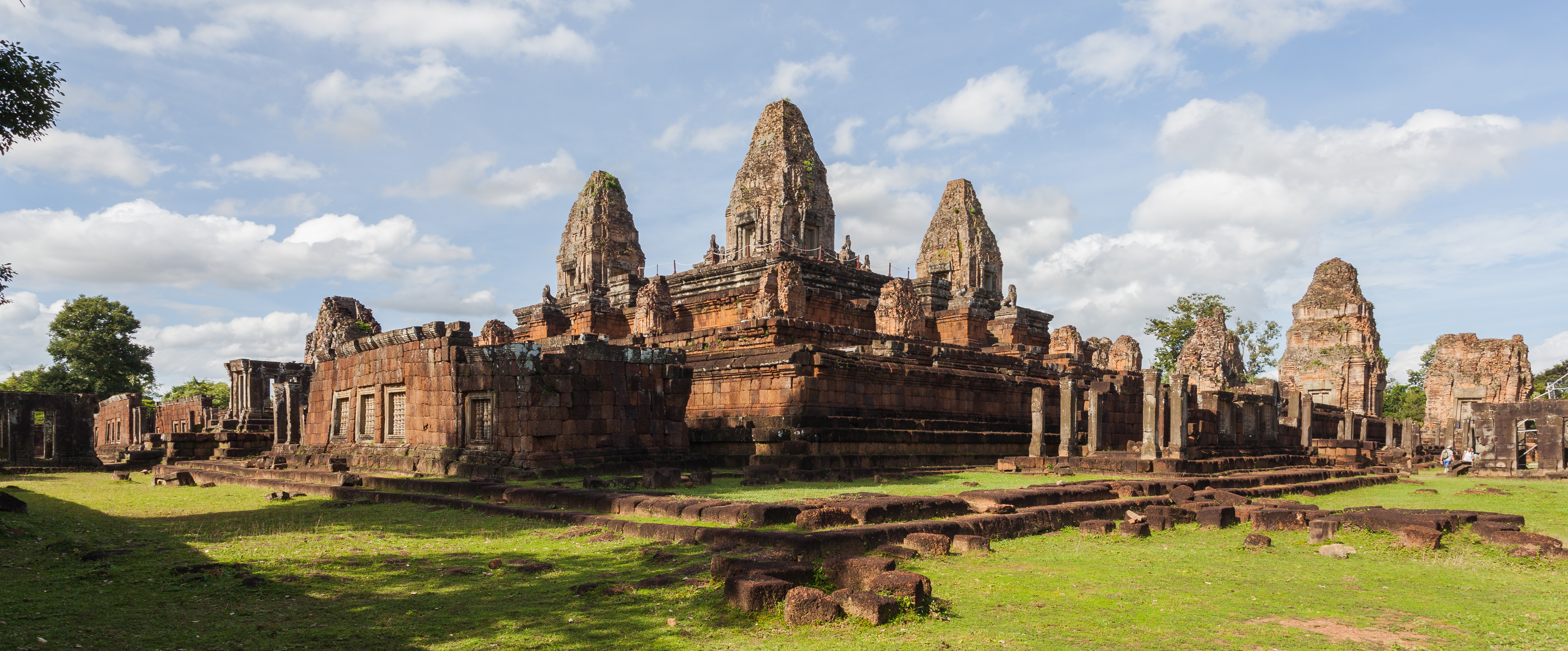
Pre Rup temple in Angkor, Cambodia

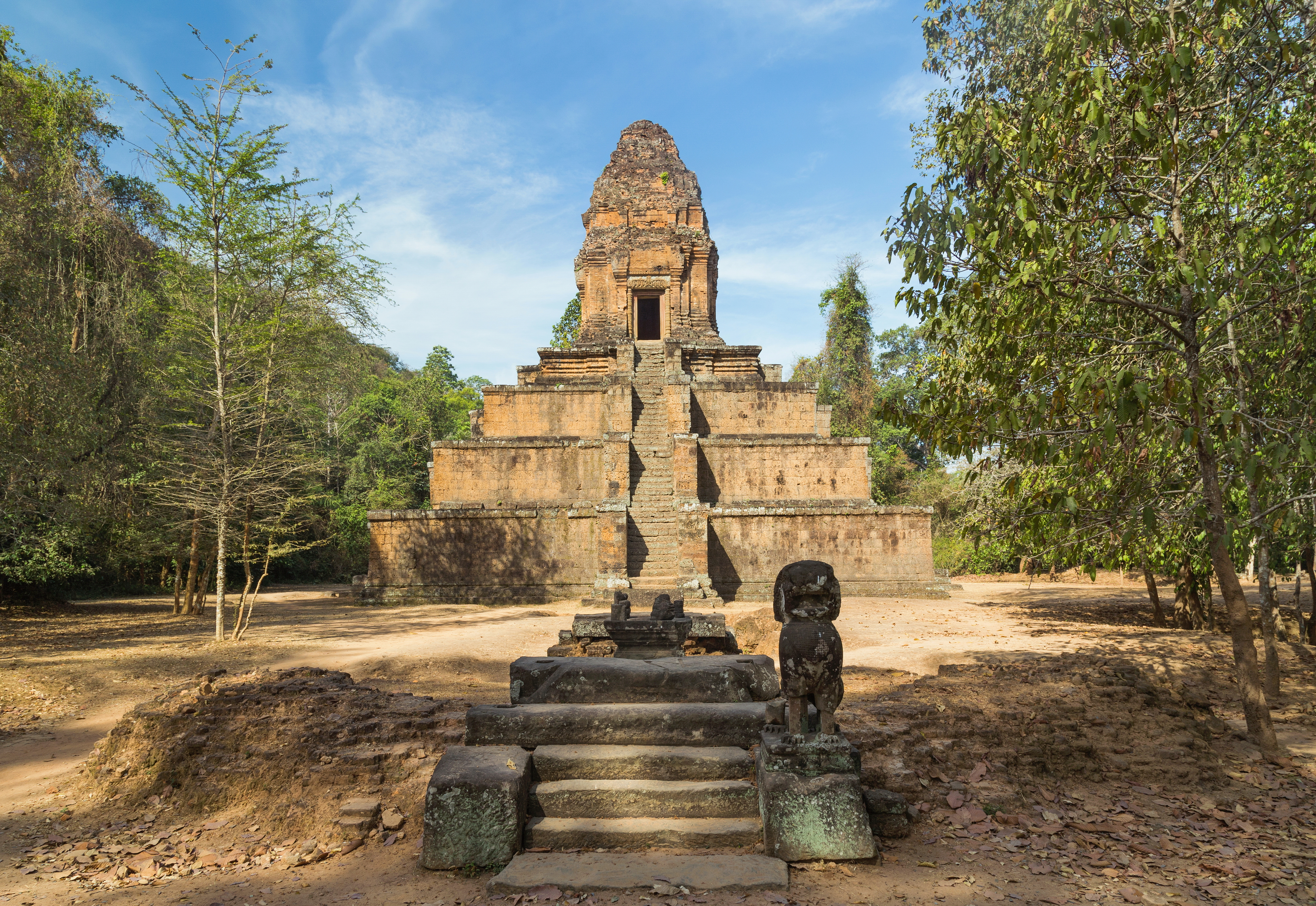
Baksei Chamkrong in Angkor, Cambodia

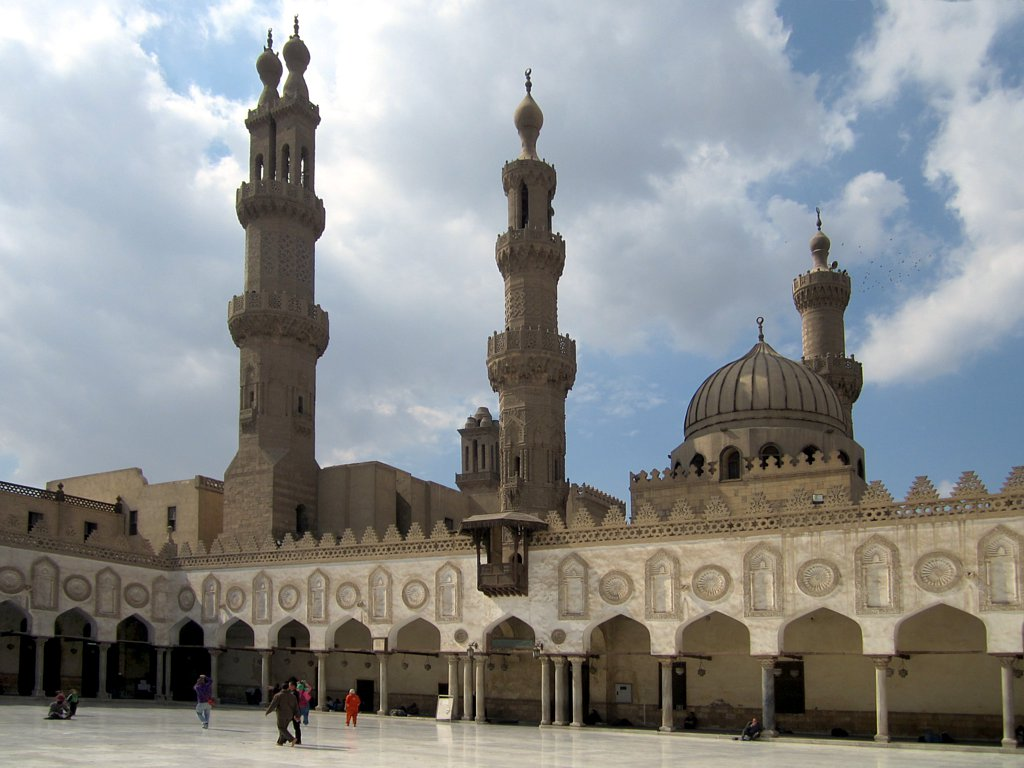
Al-Azhar Mosque in Cairo, Egypt

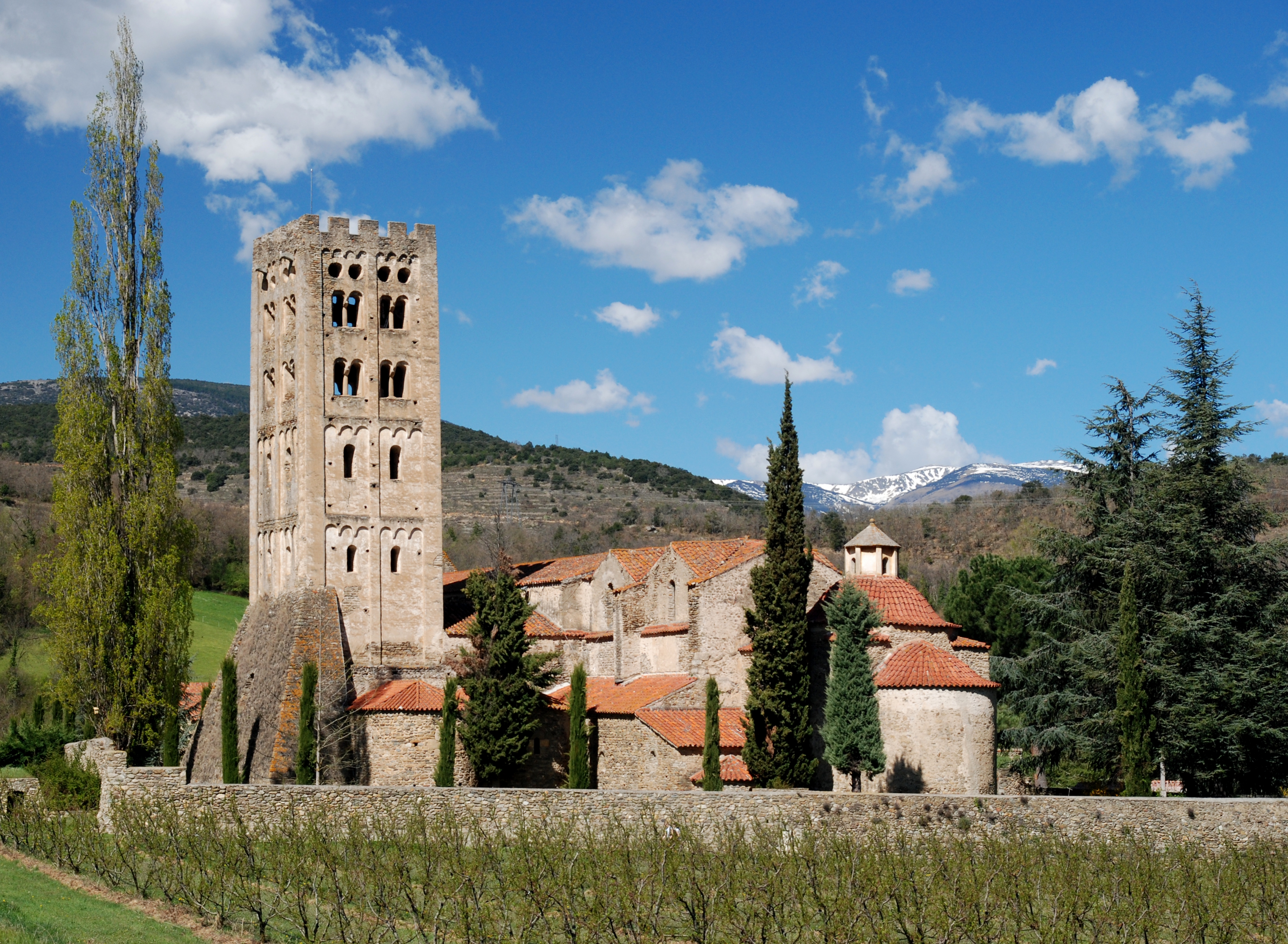
Abbey of Saint-Michel-de-Cuxa in Codalet, France

=== Buildings ===
- 900–910 – Construction of Phnom Bakheng, the center of the Khmer Empire capital Yasodharapura.
- 900 – Lalguan Mahadev temple is built in Khajuraho, Chandela kingdom.
- 908 – Monastery of the Mother of God (Lips Monastery) inaugurated in Constantinople.
- c. 910 – Construction of the Governor's Palace in the Maya city of Uxmal.
- 910 – Souillac Abbey founded.
- 913 – Minden Cathedral founded.
- 925 – Brahma Temple is built in Khajuraho, Chandela kingdom.
- 936 – Gndevank monastery founded in Armenia.
- 938 – St Martin's Church, Tours fortified.
- 939 – Lakshmana temple is built in Khajuraho, Chandela kingdom.
- 953 – East Mebon consecrated in Angkor.
- 941–942 – Kaminarimon, the eight-pillared gate to the Sensō-ji Buddhist temple in Tokyo, Japan, is erected in its original location.
- 943 – Rudra Mahalaya Temple in Siddhpur, India, begun.
- 945 – Palace of Medina Azahara first occupied as the new capital of the Emirate of Córdoba (begun c. 936; construction continues until c. 961).
- 946 – Clermont-Ferrand Cathedral in the Auvergne consecrated.
- 950 – Varaha temple is built in Khajuraho, Chandela kingdom.
- c. 950–1050 – St Nicholas' Church, Worth, England first built.
- 954 – Parshvanatha temple is built in Khajuraho, Chandela kingdom.
- 960 – Ghantai temple is built in Khajuraho, Chandela kingdom.
- c. 960–969 – Convent church of St. Cyriakus, Gernrode in the Marca Geronis constructed.
- 961 – Tiger Hill Pagoda (Yunyan Pagoda or Huqiu Tower) of Suzhou, China is completed (begun in 907).
- 962 – Pre Rup temple built in Angkor, Cambodia.
- 963 – Second abbey at Cluny begun.
- 965 – Reconstruction of St. Maria im Kapitol, Cologne begun.
- 967 – Tribhuvanamahesvara (Great Lord of the Threefold World) temple (modern name Banteay Srei) consecrated in the Khmer Empire.
- 968 – Construction of Baksei Chamkrong in the Khmer Empire.
- c. 970
  - Muktesvara deula in Bhubaneswar, Odisha, completed.
  - Palace temple of Phimeanakas in Angkor constructed.
  - Tower nave of All Saints' Church, Earls Barton, England, built.
- 972 – Construction of al-Azhar Mosque, Cairo complete.
- 973 – Foundation of Cairo, capital of Fatimid Egypt.
- 974 – Construction of Saint-Michel-de-Cuxa, Catalonia complete.
- 975 – Mainz Cathedral begun.
- 977 – Longhua Pagoda in Shanghai, China is begun.
- 980 – St. Pantaleon's Church, Cologne built (the notable Westwork dates back to this period).
- 980s – Saint-Pierre-de-Jumièges constructed.
- 987 – Last enlargement campaign on the Great Mosque of Cordoba in the Emirate of Córdoba, bringing the monument close to its modern-day aspect.
- 990s – Notre-Dame de la Basse-Œuvre, Beauvais constructed.
- 995 – Mahishasuramardini temple is built in Khajuraho, Chandela kingdom.
- 999 – Bab-al-Mardum Mosque built in Toledo, Emirate of Cordoba.
- 999 – Vishvanatha temple is built in Khajuraho, Chandela kingdom.
- Date Unknown
  - Church of the Theotokos in Hosios Loukas, Byzantine Greece.
  - Dormition of the Theotokos Church, Labovë e Kryqit, Albania
  - Khakhuli Monastery built in Tao.

== See also ==
- 9th century in architecture
- 1000s in architecture
- Timeline of architecture
