= 7th century in architecture =

== Buildings and structures ==
=== Buildings ===
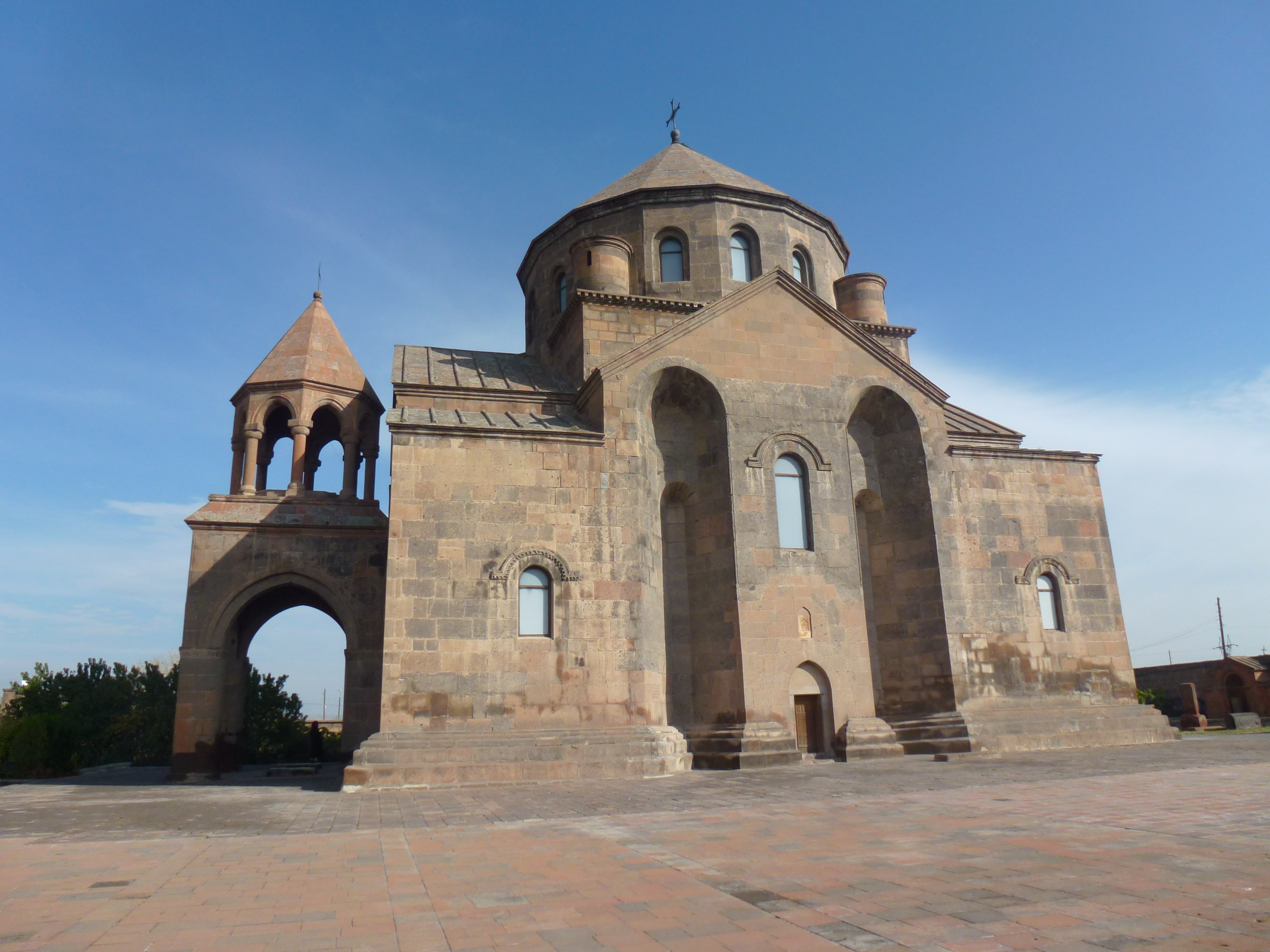
St. Hripsime Church in Echmiadzin, Armenia

- 601–607 – Hōryū-ji (法隆寺) in Nara, Japan, built for the first time.
- 605 – Completion of
  - Anji Bridge (趙州橋 or Zhaozhou Bridge) in Sui dynasty China. The bridge was finished in 616.
  - Jvari monastery in Georgia.
- 611 – Four Gates Pagoda (四門塔) in Sui dynasty China is completed.
- 613 – Abbey of Saint Gall in Switzerland founded.
- 618 – St. Hripsime Church in Echmiadzin, Armenia built.
- 634 – Omar ibn al-Khattab Mosque, Dumat al-Jandal, Arabia is completed.
- 635 – Convent on Lindisfarne, off the coast of Bernicia (north east England), founded.
- 636 – Xumi Pagoda (須彌塔) in Zhengding, Tang dynasty China, built.
- 640 – Daqin Pagoda (大秦塔) in Chang'an, Tang dynasty China, completed.
- 641 – Mosque of Amr ibn al-As in Fustat, Umayyad Egypt, begun.
- 646 – Hwangnyongsa pagoda completed.
- 652
  - Giant Wild Goose Pagoda (大雁塔) in Chang'an, capital of Tang dynasty China, first built.
  - Zvartnots Cathedral in Armenia built.

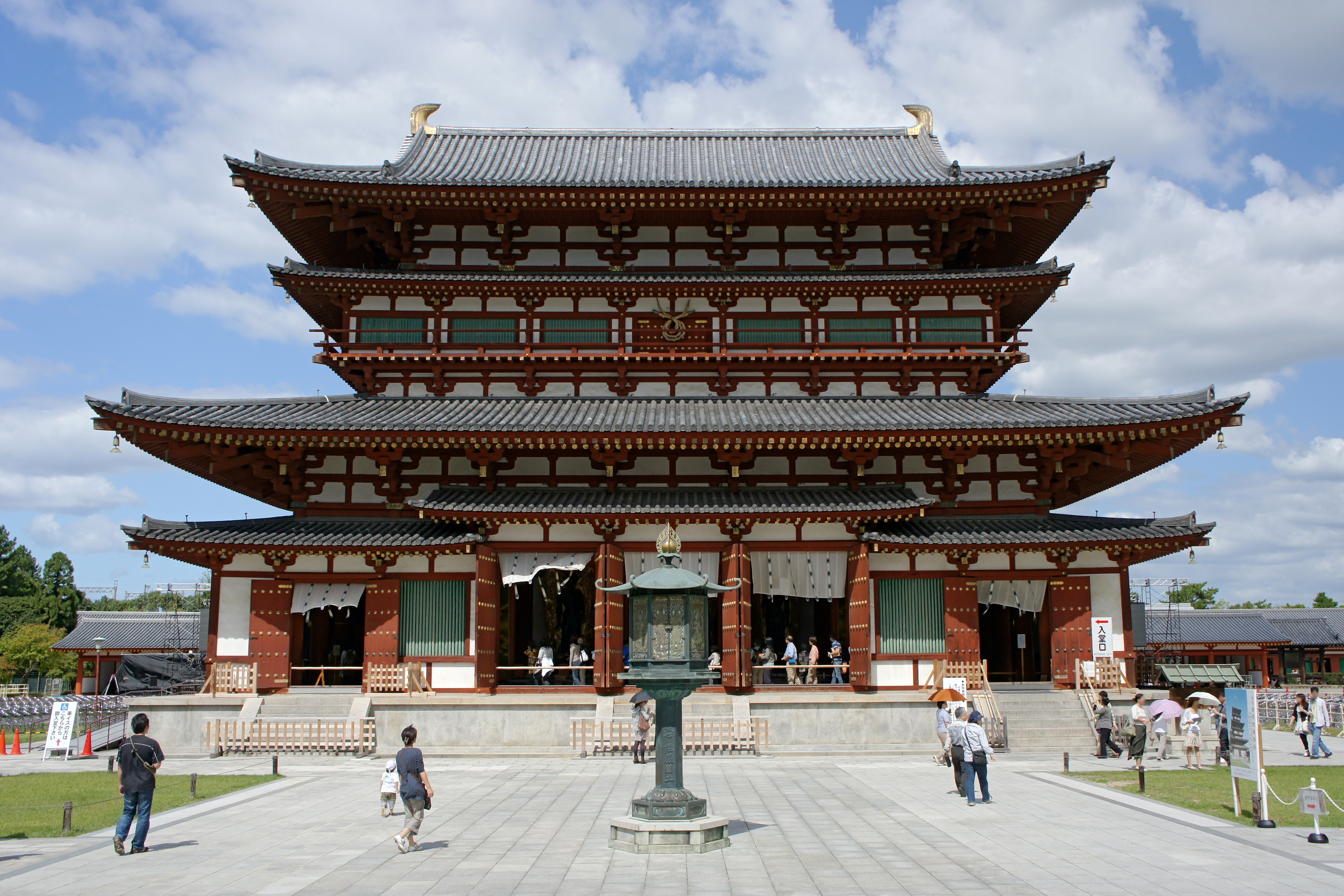
Yakushi-ji in Fujiwara-kyō, Japan

- 654 – Jumièges Abbey in Normandy founded.
- 661 – San Juan de Baños, Palencia in Visigothic Spain consecrated.
- 662-663 – Penglai Palace renovated.
- 669 – Kōfuku-ji (興福寺) Buddhist temple in Yamashina, Japan, first constructed.
- c. 670
  - City of Kairouan in Tunisia and its Great Mosque founded.
  - All Saints' Church, Brixworth in England founded.
- 674 – Monkwearmouth-Jarrow Abbey in Northumbria founded.
- 680
  - Yakushi-ji (薬師寺) Buddhist temple first built in Fujiwara-kyō, capital of Asuka period Japan.
  - Construction begins on San Pedro de la Nave church in Zamora, Visigothic Spain.
- c. 682 – Work begin on the construction of Fujiwara-kyō (藤原京) as the future capital of Japan (694-710).
- 683 – Temple of Inscriptions built in the Maya city of Palenque.
- 684 – Qianling Mausoleum (乾陵) near Chang'an, Tang dynasty China, completed.
- 691-692 – Dome of the Rock in Jerusalem, Umayyad Empire, completed.
- 692 – Temple of the Cross built in the Maya city of Palenque.
- 698 – Abbey of Echternach in Luxembourg founded.
- Year unknown – Saint Frutuoso Chapel in Braga, Visigothic Kingdom, built.
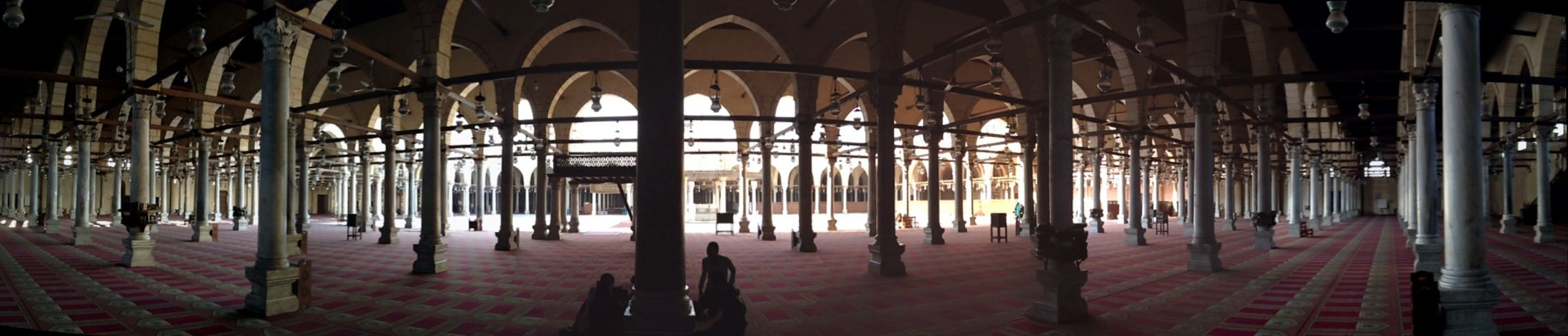
Panorama view of interior of the Mosque of Amr ibn al-As, Fustat, Egypt

== See also ==
- 6th century in architecture
- 8th century in architecture
- Timeline of architecture
