= 3rd century in architecture =

== Buildings and structures ==
=== Buildings ===
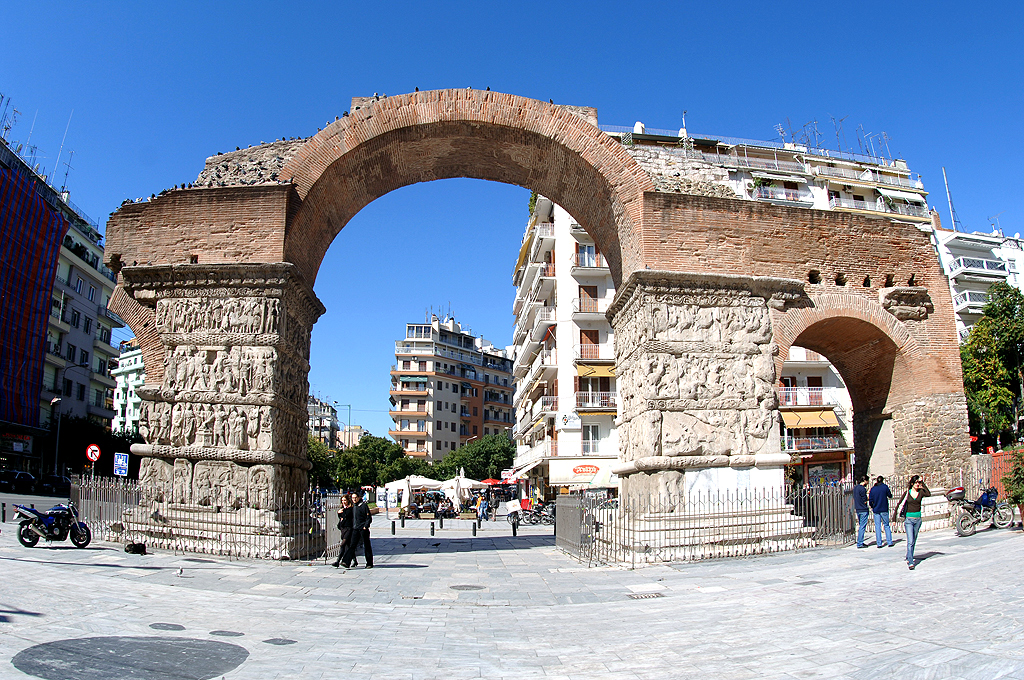
Arch of Galerius in Thessaloniki

- 209 – Ghal'eh Dokhtar castle built in Persia by future Sassanid Emperor Ardashir I.
- 216 – Baths of Caracalla, Rome, completed.
- 224 – Palace of Ardashir built near Ghal'eh Dokhtar by Ardashir I.
- 266 – Bishapur city founded by Emperor Shapur I as a capital for the Sassanid Empire
- 290s – Diocletian's Palace, Split, completed.
- 298–299 – Arch of Galerius in Thessaloniki (Macedonia) built.

== See also ==
- Timeline of architecture
