= Church of Saint John the Baptist, Kerch =

Historic site in Kerch, Crimea

Church of St John the Baptist, Kerch
- Церква Іоана Предтечі (Ukrainian)
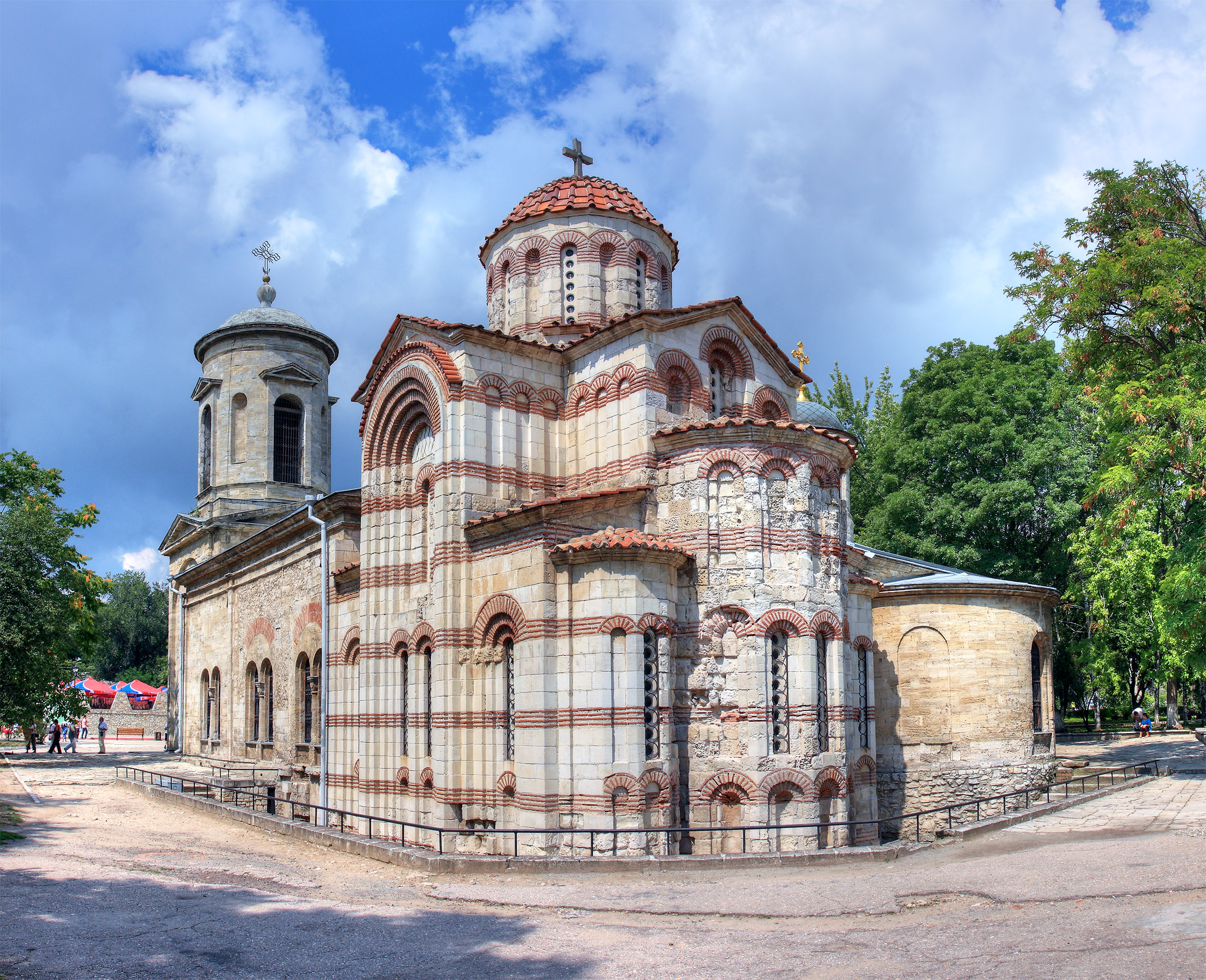
- Church of St John the Baptist, Kerch

- Location within Crimea
- 45°21′05″N 36°28′33″E
- Location: Kerch

History
- Built: 757

Site notes
- Architectural style: Byzantine

Immovable Monument of National Significance of Ukraine
- Official name: Церква Івана Предтечі (Church of St John the Baptist)
- Type: Architecture
- Reference no.: 010048

The Church of St John the Baptist (also known as Church of St John the Precursor) is a Christian church located in the city center of Kerch, Crimea. Built in the Byzantine architectural style, it is noted for the candy-striping in its façade. Dating to 717 AD, it is said to be one of the oldest churches in Eastern Europe.

== History ==
The church is located at the foot of the Mitridatskaya steps (there are 432 steps), which rises to the Mitridat Hill where there are a series of ancient sites. St John's Baptist Church is one of the oldest Christian churches built in the Byzantine architecture style; it was built during the Khazar era in the 8th century. An inscription in the older part of the church reads: "Here lies the servant of God Kyriakos, a son of George, a grandson of Vindira. He died on the month of June 3, induction 10th, in the year 6265 from Adam". This has been interpreted as the year 757 AD. During the period of the Soviet Union, the church was used as a gem museum. Following the restoration works carried out in the 1980s, church services have been resumed since 1990. In 1982, Tatjana Ivanovna Makarova published an article, Archaeological dating of the John the Precursor church in Kerch.

== Features ==
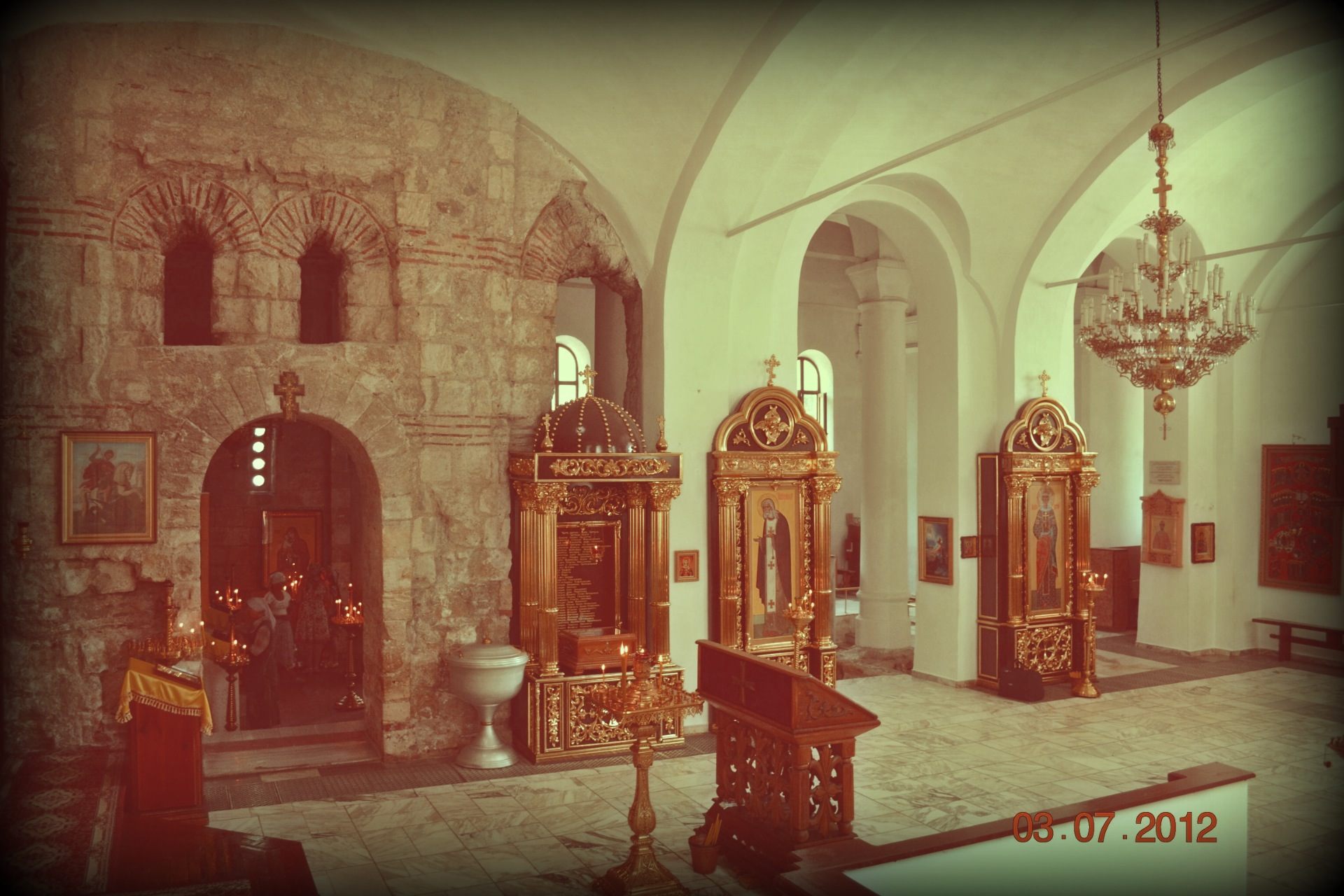
Interior views

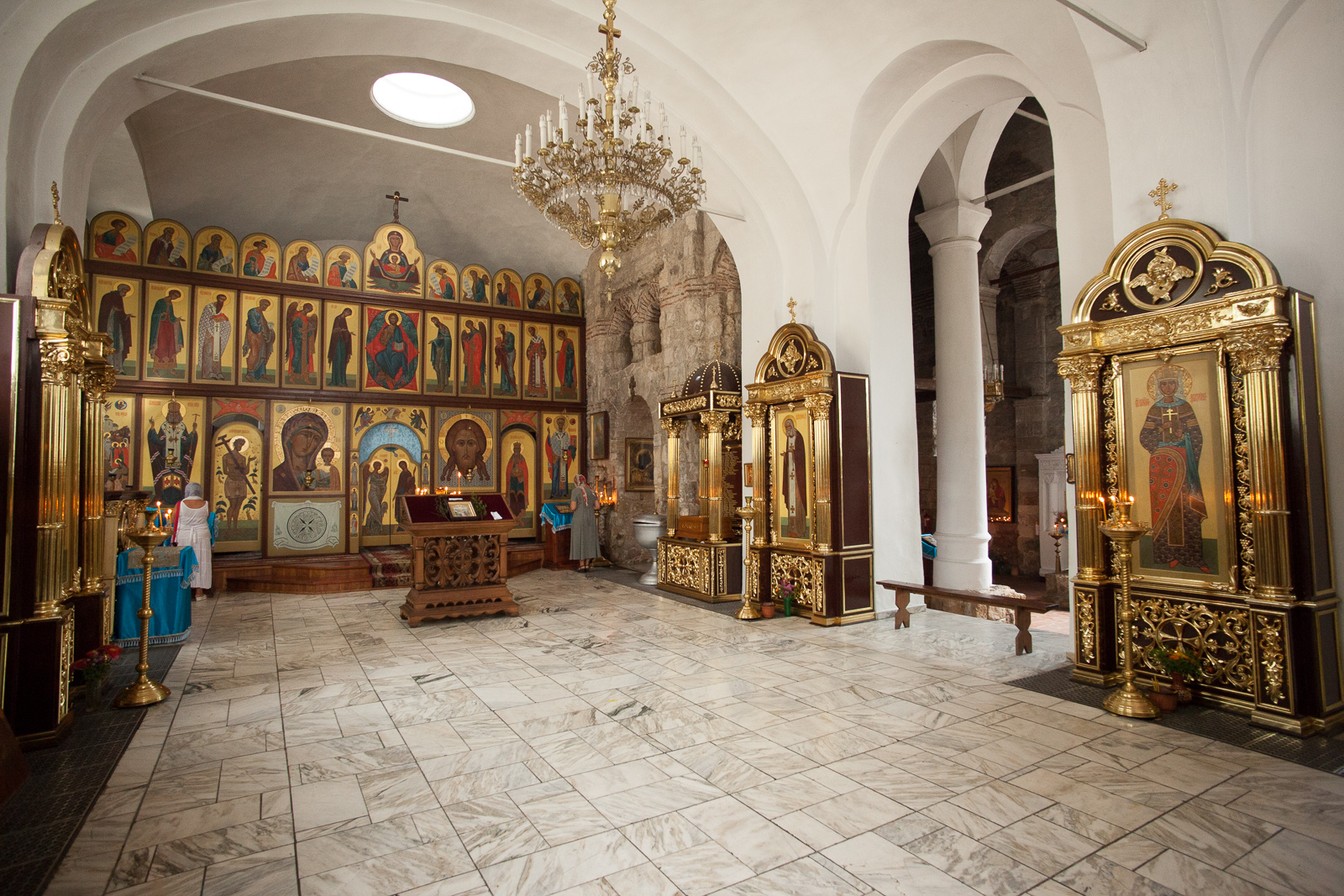
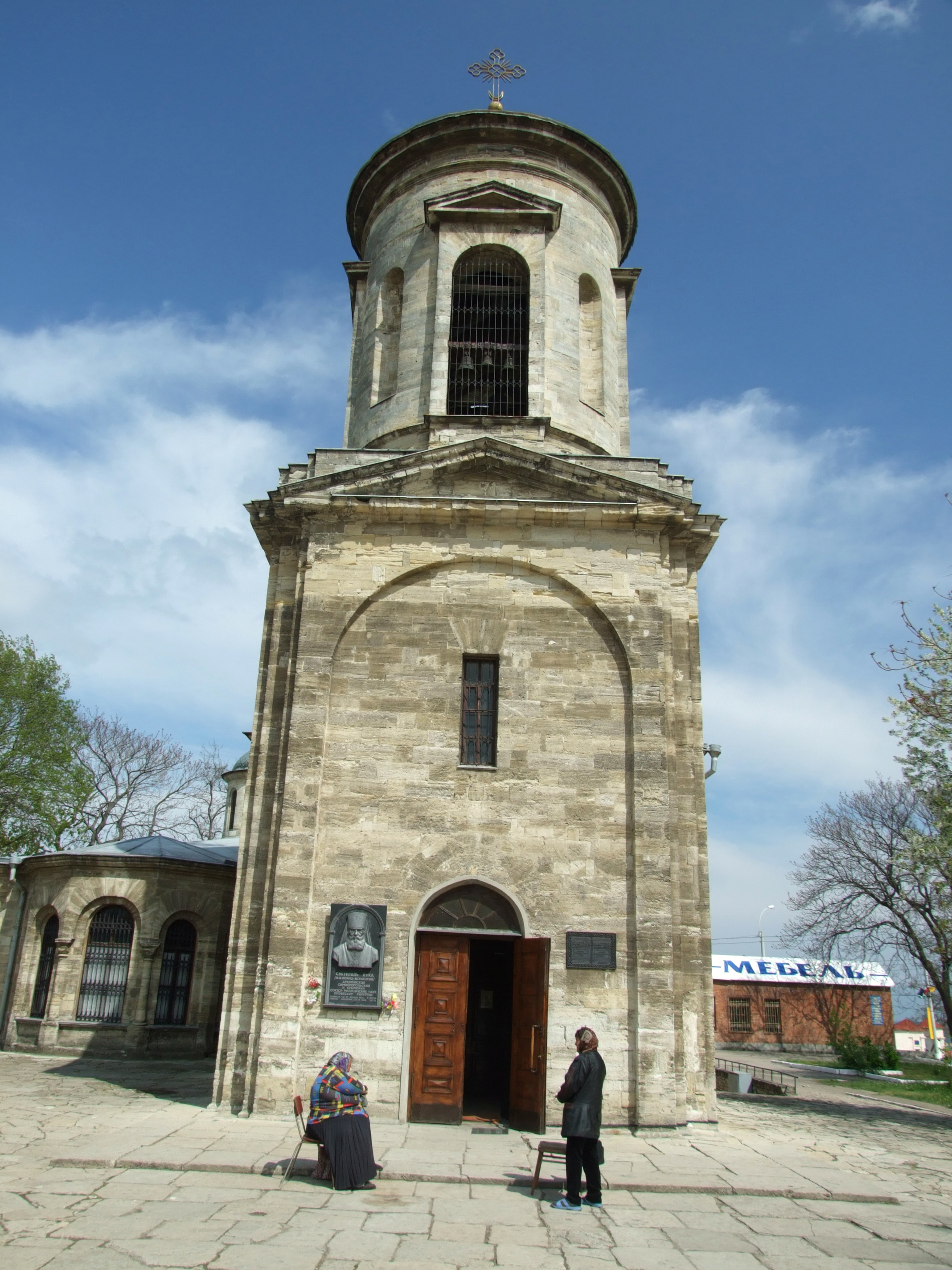
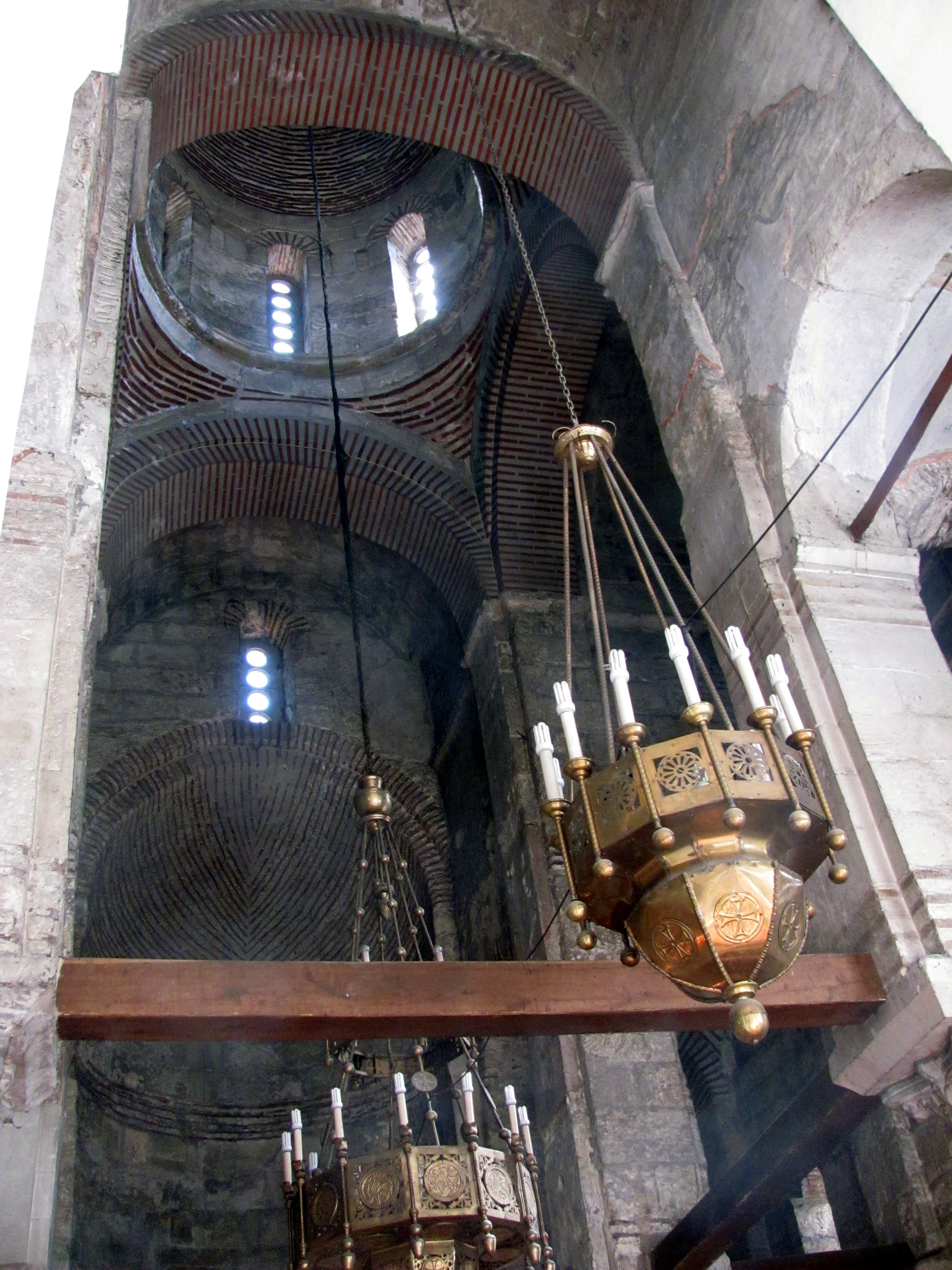
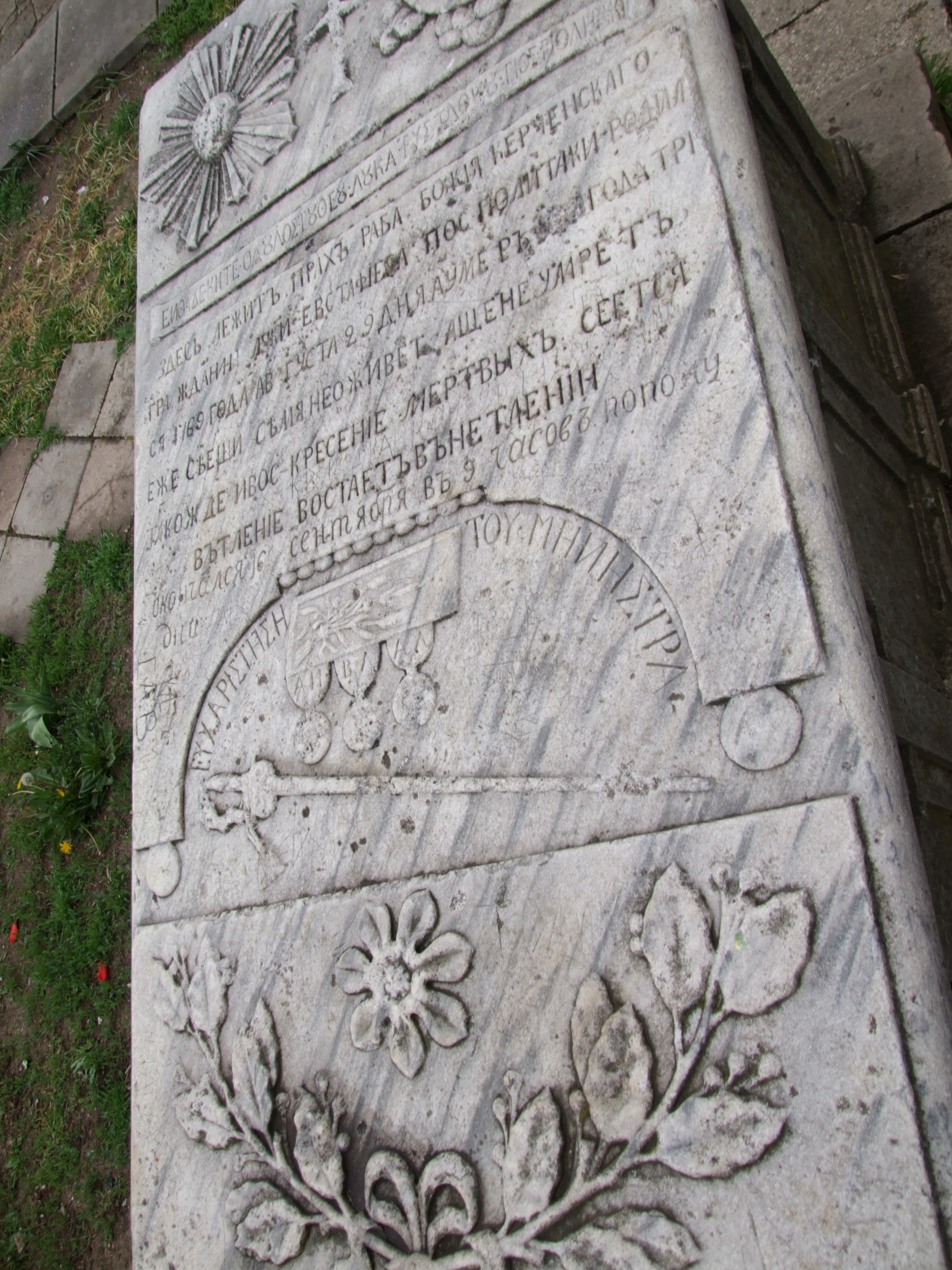

In the oldest area of the church, there is a "four-pillar cross-dome" with the facade formed by semicircular recesses built over cross-shaped columns. The base of these columns are founded over marble columns which are provided with Corinthian capitals. It is inferred that this type of architectural feature existed on the basilicas built in the 6th century. Next to the western side of the church, there is a basilica which is dated between the 11th and 13th centuries. A new chapel was added to the church in the 19th century, which was followed by enlarging the basilica with stone works, and with a belfry. The narthex, which existed in the old church, has been demolished. The building material used in the old part of the church is light Kerch limestone. The walls of the church have been built with bricks in successive layers, laid in alternate stages of four layers of masonry followed by four layers of red clay bricks which act against earthquake effects. However, in the new extensions made to the church this seismic proofed type of wall construction is not evident. The old part of the church has withstood the vagaries of weather conditions. The interior of the church contains murals from the 13th–14th centuries.

== Bibliography ==
- Archaeological News (1985). Archaeological News. Vol. 14. Archaeological News, Incorporated.
- Bloom, Greg (2008). Ukraine. Ediz. Inglese. Lonely Planet. ISBN 978-1-74104-481-2.
- Chisholm, Hugh; Garvin, James Louis (1926). The Encyclopædia Britannica: a dictionary of arts, sciences, literature & general information. The Encyclopædia Britannica Company, ltd.
- Corning (1984). J. Glass Stud. Corning Museum of Glass.
- Evans, Andrew; Pasquale, Massimiliano Di (2013). Ukraine. Bradt Travel Guides. ISBN 978-1-84162-450-1.
- Kovács, László; Radócz, Gyula (31 December 2008). Vulvae, Eyes, Snake Heads: Archaeological Finds of Cowrie Amulets. Archaeopress. ISBN 978-1-4073-0333-8.
- Meakin, Annette M. B.; Meakin, Annette M. R. (1906). Russia, Travels and Studies. Hurst.
- Grinevetsky, Sergei R.; Zonn, Igor S.; Zhiltsov, Sergei S. (30 September 2014). The Black Sea Encyclopedia. Springer. ISBN 978-3-642-55227-4.
