= Timeline of Spanish history =

This is a timeline of Spanish history, comprising important legal and territorial changes and political events in Spain and its predecessor states. To read about the background to these events, see History of Spain.

== 5th century ==
Year	Date	Event	Map
407	Autumn	Resistance of Honorius cousins in Spain. Constantine III sends his son Constans II with an army.	
408	Summer	Gerontius, Roman general (magister militum) ends the revolt in Hispain.	
409	Spring	Gerontius, who had been a partisan of Constantine III, revolts in Hispania. He elevates Maximus, his domesticus, as emperor.	
409	13 October	The Vandals, led by King Gunderic, cross the Pyrenees into the Iberian Peninsula. They receive land from the Romans, as foederati, in Baetica (Southern Spain). The Alans occupy lands in Lusitania and the Suebi control parts of Gallaecia.	
410	Spring	Gerontius successfully defended himself against Constans II.	
411		The Alans establish their rule in the Roman province of Lusitania (Portugal south of the Duero River and Spain).	
416		Wallia is campaigning against the Vandals and Alans on behalf of Emperor Honorius.	
418		Emperor Honorius bribes Wallia, king of the Visigoths, into regaining Hispania for the Roman Empire. His victory over the Vandals forces them to retire to Baetica.	
420		Comes Asterius conducts campaign in Gallaecia and ends the usurpation of Maximus. A Roman army under command of vicar Maurocellus suffers a defeat at Braga in Gallaecia.	Asterius campagne in Gallaecia
422		Vandal war: The Roman commander-in-chief Castinus leads a defeat against the Vandals at Baetica.	
429	Spring	The Vandals including Alans, led by Genseric ("Caesar King"), cross the narrow Strait of Gibraltar with their families from the Iberian Peninsula.	
439		Rechila conquers the city Mérida.	
441		Rechila invades Baetica and conquers the capital Seville	
456		the Gothic king Theoderic II starts a war commissioned by the West Roman emperor Avitus.	Situation prior to the Gothic war
460		The fleet Emperor Majorian assembles in Nova Carthago (Cartagena) in preparation for an invasion of the Vandal Kingdom in Africa becomes destroyed by the Vandal king Geiseric.	
464		The Suevic nation in Galicia (Northern Spain) is unified under King Remismund.	
473		The Gothic king Euric orders his army to conquer the province of Tarragonenses.	Situation in Spain before the war
475	Spring	The comes Hispaniarum Vincentius capitulates against the Aquitanian Goths. The Goths complete their conquest of Spain.	

== 6th century ==
Year	Date	Event	Map
507		The Franks attacked allied with the Burgundians to the Visigothic Kingdom of Toulouse. Alaric II was killed at the Battle of Vouillé, and Toulouse was sacked. The Visigoths had lost most of their Gallic holdings and are retreated to Hispania and Septimania, helped by Ostrogoths. Kingdom of Toulouse ended and The Arian Kingdom of Hispania began. Barcelona was the new capital of the Visigoths. From this moment, little by little, Visigothic Hispania will be the first effective realisation of an independent Kingdom or State of wholly Hispanic territories and scope.	
552		Byzantine Empire conquered part of the south of the Visigothic kingdom.	Visigothic Hispania and the Byzantine province of Spania, after Byzantine Empire conquest (green colour).
567		Toledo. Capital of the Visigothic kingdom by the end of the reign of Athanagild.	
568		Liuvigild began his reign. He is among the greatest Visigothic kings of the Arian period because he consolidated Visigothic power in Spain. He is known for his Code of Leovigild, a law that allowed equal rights between the Visigothic and Hispano-Roman populations, and for expanding the territory of the Visigothic Kingdom. Since Leovigild, the Visigoth kings minted their own Tremissis coin.	
585		Liuvigild conquered the Suebic Kingdom.	Map showing the conquests of Leovigild.
589	8 May	The Third Council of Toledo marks the entry of Visigothic Spain into the Catholic Church, after Reccared I converted in 587. The Catholic Kingdom of Toledo began.	

== 7th century ==
Year	Date	Event	Map
624		Swinthila reconquered the south of Byzantine Hispania.	
624		"History of the Kings of the Goths" is written by Isidore of Seville. In the prologue, "Laus Spaniae" (Praises to Spain), introduces the phrase mater Spania (mother Spain) and defends the Gothic identity of a unified Spain.	
625		The entire Hispania and Septimania is under the Visigothic Kingdom. Swinthila defeated the Basques.	Visigothic Hispania and its regional divisions from 625 to 711, prior to the Muslim conquest
654		Recceswinth was responsible for the promulgation of a law code, Liber Iudiciorum. The new laws applied to both Gothic and Hispano-Roman populations.	

== 8th century ==
Year	Date	Event	Map
711	July	The Battle of Guadalete was the first major battle of the Umayyad conquest of Hispania. Roderic, the last Visigoth king in Hispania under the rule from Toledo, died in the battle.	Umayyad invasion: Light yellow; Visigoth kingdom. Green; Christian resistance. Brown; submission agreement. Garnet; capitulation
718		The Visigothic nobleman Pelagius of Asturias rebelled against the Umayyad Caliphate.	
722	Summer	Battle of Covadonga: Forces loyal to Pelagius decimated an Umayyad army sent to reconquer them in a valley in the Picos de Europa.	
722		Pelagius was elected princeps of the independent Kingdom of Asturias with his capital at Cangas de Onís.	Kingdom of Asturias and Umayyad Caliphate
737		Pelagius died. He was succeeded as princeps by his son Favila of Asturias.	
739		Favila was killed by a bear while hunting. He was succeeded by his brother-in-law Alfonso I the Catholic of Asturias, the son of Peter of Cantabria, the duke of Cantabria.	
740		Asturias conquered and annexed Galicia.	
757		Alfonso the Catholic died. He was succeeded as king by his son Fruela I the Cruel of Asturias.	
768	14 January	Fruela was assassinated.	
768		Fruela's cousin Aurelius of Asturias was crowned king of Asturias.	
774		Aurelius died. He was succeeded by his cousin-in-law, Silo of Asturias, husband of Alfonso the Catholic's daughter Adosinda. Silo established his capital at Pravia.	
783		Silo died.	
783		Adosinda engineered the election of her nephew Alfonso II the Chaste of Asturias, son of Fruela, as king of Asturias.	
783		A coalition of nobles elected Alfonso the Catholic's illegitimate son Mauregatus of Asturias king of Asturias. Alfonso the Chaste fled to Álava.	
789		Mauregatus died.	
789		Aurelius's brother Bermudo I the Deacon, the Monk of Asturias was elected king of Asturias.	
791		Battle of the Burbia River: An Asturian force attacked a Cordoban army near Villafranca del Bierzo on its return to Córdoba and was defeated.	
791		Bermudo abdicated the throne.	
791	14 September	Alfonso the Chaste was crowned king of Asturias in Oviedo, Spain.	
791		Alfonso the Chaste established his capital at Oviedo.	
794		Battle of Lutos: A Cordoban army returning from a scorched earth campaign in modern Álava was wiped out by an Asturian force.	
795	18 September	Battle of Las Babias: Córdoba attacked and routed an Asturian force near Astorga, Spain.	

== 9th century ==
Year	Date	Event	Map
816		Battle of Pancorbo (816): Córdoba slaughtered a Basque-Asturian force defending the Basque homeland in the Pyrenees at Pancorbo.	Iberian Peninsula in 814
824		Battle of Roncevaux Pass (824): A combined force of Basques and the Banu Qasi, both vassals of the emirate of Córdoba, defeated a Carolingian military expedition in the Roncevaux Pass. The Basque chieftain Íñigo Arista of Pamplona was crowned king of Navarre at Pamplona.	
842		Alfonso the Chaste died.	
842		The Asturian nobility elected Nepotian of Asturias, a relative of Alfonso the Chaste, king.	
842		Battle of the Bridge of Cornellana: Forces loyal to Bermudo's son Ramiro I of Asturias defeated Nepotian in modern Salas, Asturias.	
850	1 February	Ramiro died. He was buried in the Pantheon of Asturian Kings in Oviedo. His son Ordoño I of Asturias succeeded him as king.	
851		Battle of Albelda (851): Ordoño suppressed a Basque revolt in northeastern Asturias and expelled an opportunistic Cordoban invasion near Albelda.	
851		Íñigo died. He was succeeded as king of Navarre by his son García Íñiguez of Pamplona.	
852		Battle of Guadalacete: Asturian and Pamplonan forces arriving in support of a revolt of the people of Toledo, Spain were routed by a Cordoban army.	
859		Vikings captured García and extorted a ransom of some seventy thousand gold dinars from Navarre for his return.	
860		Cordoban forces captured García's son and heir Fortún Garcés the One-Eyed, the Monk of Pamplona in Milagro, Navarre.	
862		An eastern march of Asturias was created the county of Castile under count Rodrigo of Castile.	
865	9 August	Battle of the Morcuera: Córdoba attacked Asturias, forcing the retreat of Asturian forces and their Castilian allies along the valley of the Ebro.	
866	27 May	Ordoño died. He was succeeded by his eldest son Alfonso III the Great of Asturias.	
866		Fruela seized the throne of Asturias and forced Alfonso the Great to flee to Castile.	
866		Fruela was assassinated in Oviedo.	
868		Asturias conquered Porto. Vímara Peres was created count of Portugal.	
870		García died. García Jiménez of Pamplona took power as regent, García's son and heir Fortún Garcés remaining in captivity in Córdoba.	
873	5 November	Rodrigo died. He was succeeded as count of Castile by his son Diego Rodríguez Porcelos.	
878		Asturias conquered Coimbra.	
882		First Battle of Cellorigo: Vela Jiménez, count of the Asturian county of Álava, repelled an attempted conquest by the Emirate of Córdoba of an important mountain pass at Cellorigo.	
882		Fortún Garcés was returned to rule in Navarre.	
883		Second Battle of Cellorigo: Vela Jiménez repelled an attempted conquest by the Emirate of Córdoba of an important mountain pass at Cellorigo.	
885	31 January	Rodríguez died.	

== 10th century ==
Year	Date	Event
901	July	Day of Zamora: The Asturian defenders of Zamora, Spain dealt heavy casualties to a Cordoban force attempting to conquer it. The heads of the besiegers were displayed on the city walls.
905		The Navarrese nobility removed Fortún Garcés from the throne, placing Sancho I of Pamplona there in his stead.
910	20 December	Alfonso the Great died and was buried at Oviedo Cathedral. His kingdom was divided among his three sons, with his eldest, García I of León, receiving León, Ordoño II of León receiving Galicia, and Fruela II of Asturias receiving a rump Asturias including Castile.
914	19 January	García I died. His lands passed to Ordoño II.
917		Battle of San Esteban de Gormaz (917): Leonese forces broke a Cordoban siege of San Esteban de Gormaz.
920	26 July	Battle of Valdejunquera: A Cordoban army invading Castile routed a joint Leonese-Navarrese force at Valdejunquera, probably between modern Estella-Lizarra and Pamplona, forcing the abandonment by León of Clunia.
922		Navarre defeated Galindo Aznárez II, count of the County of Aragon, in battle and forced him into vassalage.
924	June	Ordoño II died.
924		The Leonese nobility elected Fruela II king of León.
925	July	Fruela II died, possibly from leprosy. His will named his son Alfonso Fróilaz his successor. Ordoño II's sons Sancho Ordóñez, Alfonso IV the Monk of León and Ramiro II of León did not recognize Fróilaz's succession, however, leaving him in de facto authority only in Galicia.
925		Fruela II's younger brother, a Ramiro, married his widow Urraca bint Abd Allah and claimed the royal title.
925		Ordóñez, Alfonso the Monk and Ramiro II forced Fróilaz into exile in the eastern marches of Asturias.
925		Ordóñez seized León, Spain.
925		Alfonso the Monk, with the support of Navarre and the Leonese nobility, expelled Ordóñez from León, Spain.
925	10 December	Sancho I died. He was succeeded by his young son García Sánchez I of Pamplona with his brother Jimeno Garcés of Pamplona acting as regent.
926		Ordóñez was crowned princeps of Galicia.
929	16 August	Ordóñez died. His territory passed to Alfonso the Monk.
931		Fernán González of Castile became count of Castile.
931		Álvaro Herraméliz, count of Lantarón and Álava, died. Fernán González inherited his territories and united them with Castile.
931	29 May	Jimeno Garcés died.
931		Alfonso the Monk was forced to abdicate the rule of León and Galicia to his brother Ramiro II.
939	19 July	Battle of Simancas: A battle began near Simancas which would see a joint Leonese-Navarrese force repel an attempted Cordoban conquest of the lands around the Douro.
939	5 August	Battle of Alhandic: Cordoban forces conquered the Leonese city of Zamora, Spain with great cost in lives to both sides.
951	1 January	Ramiro II died and was buried in the Basílica de San Isidoro, León. He was succeeded by his son Ordoño III of León.
956		Ordoño III died in Zamora, Spain. He was succeeded by his half-brother Sancho I the Fat of León.
958		The Leonese nobility, led by Fernán González, deposed Sancho the Fat in favor of Alfonso the Monk's son Ordoño IV the Wicked, the Bad of León.
960		Sancho the Fat was restored to the throne of León with the support of Navarre and Córdoba.
966		Sancho the Fat was poisoned by count Gonzalo Menéndez of Portugal and buried in the Basílica de San Isidoro, León. He was succeeded by his young son Ramiro III of León, with the latter's aunt Elvira Ramírez and mother Teresa Ansúrez ruling as regents.
970	22 February	García Sánchez I died. He was succeeded by his eldest son Sancho II of Pamplona. A small territory around Viguera he willed to another son as the Kingdom of Viguera.
970		Fernán González died. He was succeeded as count of Castile by his son García Fernández of the White Hands of Castile.
981	9 July	Battle of Torrevicente: A Cordoban force dealt a bloody defeat to a rebel Cordoban general and his Vigueran and Castilian allies, probably near Atienza.
981		Battle of Rueda: A Cordoban force dealt a decisive defeat to a joint Leonese-Navarrese army in Rueda, Valladolid.
982	15 October	The Galician nobility acclaimed Ordoño III's son Bermudo II the Gouty of León king of Galicia with the support of the Caliphate of Córdoba.
984		Bermudo deposed Ramiro III and replaced him as king of León.
987		León expelled Cordoban forces from Zamora, Spain.
991	November	The Leonese nobility expelled Bermudo from the kingdom.
992	September	Bermudo was allowed to return to León.
994		Sancho II died and was buried at San Juan de la Peña. He was succeeded as king of Navarre and count of Aragon by his son García Sánchez II of Pamplona.
995	May	Fernández was captured by a Cordoban raiding party.
995	June	Fernández died of his wounds at Medinaceli. He was succeeded by his son Sancho García of the Good Laws of Castile.
996		Córdoba conquered the Leonese city of Astorga, Spain.
999		Castile declined to pay its annual tribute to Córdoba.
999	September	Bermudo died. He was succeeded by his young son Alfonso V the Noble of León, with the latter's mother Elvira of Castile, Queen of León and the count Menendo González, count of Portugal and duke in Galicia, acting as regents.
1000	29 July	Battle of Cervera: Córdoba defeated the combined forces of García of the Good Laws and García Gómez, count of Saldaña, Carrión and Liébana on a punitive expedition near modern Espinosa de Cervera.
1000		García Sánchez II died. He was succeeded as king of Navarre and count of Aragon by his young son Sancho III the Great of Pamplona, with the latter's mother Jimena Fernández and grandmother Urraca Fernandez ruling with the bishops of Navarre as regents.

== 11th century ==
Year	Date	Event	Map
1005		A Cordoban army under the caliph Hisham II invaded León with the intent of conquering Zamora, Spain.	
1005		García Ramírez of Viguera, king of Viguera, died without male heirs. His territory was absorbed by Navarre.	
1008	6 October	Menendo González died. Alfonso the Noble entered his majority.	
1009		Hisham was overthrown and imprisoned by his cousin Muhammad II of Córdoba.	
1009	1 November	Sulayman ibn al-Hakam, at the head of an army of disaffected Berbers and with the help of García of the Good Laws, defeated Muhammad, forcing the latter to flee to Toledo, Spain, and freed Hisham.	
1011		Sancho the Great married García of the Good Laws's daughter Muniadona of Castile.	
1015		Sancho the Great conquered the county of Sobrarbe.	
1017	5 February	García of the Good Laws died. He was succeeded as count of Castile and Álava by his young son García Sánchez of Castile, with Urraca of Covarrubias, the latter's aunt and Fernández's daughter, acting as regent with the Castilian nobility.	
1018		Sancho the Great annexed half of the county of Ribagorza.	
1025		Raymond III of Pallars Jussà, count of Pallars Jussà and the rump Ribagorza, pledged submission to Sancho the Great as his vassal.	
1028	7 August	Alfonso the Noble died. He was succeeded as king of León by his son Bermudo III of León.	
1029		García Sánchez was assassinated in León, Spain by the sons of a noble he had expelled from the lands between the Cea and the Pisuerga.	
1029		Sancho the Great appointed Ferdinand I the Great of León, his son and grandson of García of the Good Laws on his mother's side, count of Castile.	
1031		Hisham III of Córdoba, the caliph of Córdoba in exile, was overthrown and his title abolished by the local nobility, resulting in the immediate de jure independence of the taifas of Al-Andalus.	
1032		Alfonso the Noble's daughter Sancha of León was married to Ferdinand the Great.	
1034		Navarre conquered León, Spain. Bermudo III fled to modern Galicia.	
1035	18 October	Sancho the Great died. His kingdom was divided among his sons. Gonzalo of Sobrarbe and Ribagorza received Sobrarbe and Ribagorza. The illegitimate Ramiro I of Aragon was granted the title of bailiff and some property in Aragon. García Sánchez III of Pamplona succeeded his father as king of Navarre and held suzerainty over his brothers.	
1035		Battle of Tafalla: García Sánchez III repelled an invasion of his kingdom by Ramiro I.	
1037	4 September	Battle of Tamarón: Bermudo III of León fell from his horse and was slain by forces loyal to Ferdinand the Great.	Iberian Peninsula as of 1037
1038	22 June	Ferdinand the Great was crowned king of León and Castile in León, Spain.	
1043	26 June	Gonzalo of Sobrarbe and Ribagorza was assassinated by one of his knights.	
1043		Ramiro I annexed Sobrarbe and Ribagorza.	
1054	1 September	Battle of Atapuerca: Navarrese and Leonese forces met near modern Atapuerca, Province of Burgos. García Sánchez III and his tutor Fortún Sánchez were killed. García Sánchez III's son Sancho IV of Peñalén of Pamplona succeeded him as king under the regency of Stephanie, Queen of Navarre. León annexed Navarrese territories south of the Ebro.	
1056		Ferdinand the Great crowned himself Imperator totius Hispaniae.	
1058	25 May	Stephanie died.	
1062	29 December	Sancho of Peñalén and Ferdinand the Great signed a treaty defining their border.	
1063		Synod of Jaca (1063): Ramiro I presided over a synod in Jaca which reestablished the Roman Catholic Diocese of Huesca.	
1063	8 May	Battle of Graus: Ramiro I died in a failed attempt to take Graus from the taifa of Zaragoza. He was succeeded by his son Sancho Ramírez.	
1064	August	Crusade of Barbastro: At the urging of the pope Pope Alexander II, a coalition of Aragon, Urgell, Aquitaine and the Papal States conquered Barbastro from the taifa of Lérida.	
1065		Battle of Paterna: Valencian forces pursuing the army of Ferdinand the Great, then in retreat from a failed siege of Valencia, were ambushed and wiped out at Paterna.	
1065	24 December	Ferdinand the Great died. His kingdom was divided among his three children. The eldest, Sancho II the Strong of Castile and León, received Castile. León was divided; Galicia went to García II of Galicia, and the remainder went to Alfonso VI the Brave, the Valiant of León and Castile.	
1065		War of the Three Sanchos: Sancho the Strong began ordering border raids on Navarre.	
1067		War of the Three Sanchos: The war reached a stalemate. Castile remained in possession of the Navarrese territories in modern Álava, Montes de Oca, Pancorbo, Burgos and La Rioja.	
1068	Spring	Alfonso the Brave invaded the taifa of Badajoz.	
1068	19 July	Battle of Llantada: Sancho the Strong defeated Alfonso the Brave at Llantadilla, in the taifa of Badajoz near modern Melgar de Fernamental.	
1071	June	Sancho the Strong and Alfonso the Brave invaded Galicia from the north and south, respectively, partitioning the kingdom and forcing García II into exile in Seville.	
1072	January	Battle of Golpejera: Sancho the Strong defeated and captured Alfonso the Brave near Carrión de los Condes. The latter was released and sent into exile in Toledo.	
1072	12 January	Sancho the Strong was crowned king of León.	
1072	7 October	Sancho the Strong was betrayed and murdered by a Zamoran noble during his assault on Zamora, Spain.	
1072		Alfonso the Brave succeeded his brother Sancho the Strong as king of León and Castile.	
1074		The taifas of Toledo and Granada were forced to pay the parias to Alfonso the Brave.	
1076	4 June	Sancho of Peñalén was thrown from a cliff in Peñalén by his brother and sister. Alfonso the Brave recognized his young son García Sánchez as his successor.	
1076		The Navarrese nobility elected Sancho Ramírez king. The latter ceded some territory in Navarre's west to Alfonso the Brave.	
1076		The Emir of Zaragoza began to pay the parias to Alfonso the Brave.	
1077		Alfonso the Brave took the title Imperator totius Hispaniae.	
1079		Battle of Cabra: Seville defeated the invading forces of Granada. Both sides were aided by Castilian knights.	
1079		Alfonso the Brave conquered Coria, Cáceres.	
1083	28 April	Sancho Ramírez conquered Graus.	
1083		Under the pretense of surrender, the occupants of the castle of Rueda de Jalón, a Zaragozan stronghold, invited important nobles of León to the castle and murdered them.	
1084	14 August	Battle of Morella: A Zaragozan army led by the general El Cid decisively defeated the forces of Sancho Ramírez near Tortosa.	
1084	25 December	Battle of Piedra Pisada: A Zaragozan army skirmished with the forces of Alfonso the Brave, then following the valley of the Cinca from Naval, Huesca to El Grado.	
1085	25 May	Alfonso the Brave conquered Toledo, Spain.	
1085		Alfonso the Brave conquered modern Madrid.	
1086	March	Alfonso the Brave installed his vassal, an al-Qádir, as king of Valencia.	
1086	23 October	Battle of Sagrajas: Yusuf ibn Tashfin, the sultan of the Almoravid dynasty, at the head of a coalition of Andalusian taifas, defeated León and Castile and Aragon in a bloody battle near Badajoz. The taifas renounced payment of the parias.	
1087		Siege of Tudela: Alfonso the Brave, Sancho Ramírez, Odo I, Duke of Burgundy, the duke of Burgundy, and William the Carpenter, viscount of Melun, laid siege to the Zaragozan fortress at Tudela, Navarre.	
1087		Sancho Ramírez conquered Estada.	
1088		Sancho Ramírez took the Castle of Montearagón.	
1089	24 June	Sancho Ramírez conquered Monzón.	
1090		Yusuf overthrew the king of Valencia and sent him into exile.	
1094	4 June	Sancho Ramírez died during a siege of Huesca. He was succeeded as king of Aragon and Navarre by his eldest son Peter I of Aragon and Pamplona.	
1094	June	El Cid reconquered Valencia, Spain for Castile.	
1094	November	Alfonso the Brave lost Lisbon, Sintra and Santarém, Portugal to Almoravid conquests.	
1095	16 March	The pope Pope Urban II issued a bull forbidding the excommunication of Peter I or his queen Agnes of Aquitaine, Queen of Aragon and Navarre without his express authorization.	
1096		Battle of Alcoraz: Peter I defeated the Zaragozan forces sent to relieve his siege of Huesca.	
1096	27 November	Peter I conquered Huesca.	
1097		Battle of Bairén: An Aragonese army pinned between Almoravid forces and the Mediterranean Sea routed their enemies near modern Gandia.	
1097	15 August	Battle of Consuegra: An Almoravid force defeated one of Alfonso the Brave's armies near Consuegra.	
1097	16 August	Peter I married Bertha of Aragon in Huesca, marking the transfer of the Aragonese capital from Jaca.	

== 12th century ==
Year	Date	Event
1102		Alfonso the Brave ordered Valencia evacuated and burned in the face of an Almoravid threat.
1104		Alfonso the Brave conquered the Almoravid city of Medinaceli.
1104		Peter I died. He was succeeded as king of Aragon and Navarre by his brother Alfonso I the Battler of Aragon.
1105		Alfonso the Battler conquered the Almoravid cities of Ejea de los Caballeros and Tauste.
1107		Alfonso the Battler conquered Tamarite de Litera and San Esteban de Litera from the Almoravid dynasty.
1108	29 May	Battle of Uclés (1108): The Almoravids dealt a decisive defeat to the forces of Alfonso the Brave at Uclés, reconquering the city as well as Cuenca, Spain, Huete and Ocaña, Spain. Alfonso the Brave's son and heir Sancho Alfónsez was killed in flight by local Muslims.
1109	1 July	Alfonso the Brave died in Toledo, Spain. His daughter Urraca the Restless of León succeeded him as queen regnant of León and Castile.
1109	October	Urraca the Restless married Alfonso the Battler.
1111	26 October	Battle of Candespina: Alfonso the Battler, joined by Henry, Count of Portugal, the count of Portugal, defeated forces loyal to the former's wife Urraca the Restless at Fresno de Cantespino.
1111	Autumn	Battle of Viadangos: The noble Pedro Fróilaz de Traba and Diego Gelmírez, archbishop of the Roman Catholic Archdiocese of Santiago de Compostela, marching in support of Urraca the Restless, were routed at Villadangos del Páramo by a superior force led by Alfonso the Battler.
1112		The pope Pope Paschal II annulled the marriage of Urraca the Restless to Alfonso the Battler. The two agreed to a truce.
1117		Alfonso the Battler conquered the Almoravid cities of Fitero, Belchite, Corella, Spain, Cintruénigo, Murchante, Monteagudo, Navarre, and Cascante.
1118		Alfonso the Battler, joined by French soldiers following the declaration of a crusade, conquered the Almoravid cities of Almudévar, Gurrea de Gállego and Zuera and laid siege to Zaragoza.
1118	18 December	Alfonso the Battler conquered Zaragoza.
1119		Alfonso the Battler conquered Cervera, Tudejen, Castellón, Tarazona, Ágreda, Magallón, Borja, Zaragoza, Alagón, Zaragoza, Novillas, Mallén, Rueda, Valladolid and Épila from the Almoravid dynasty.
1120		Battle of Cutanda: Alfonso the Battler defeated forces of the Almoravid dynasty at Cutanda near Calamocha, conquering that town as well as Calatayud and Daroca for Aragon.
1120		Alfonso the Battler conquered the Almoravid cities of Calatayud, Bubierca, Alhama de Aragón, Ariza, Zaragoza and Daroca.
1122		Alfonso the Battler established the Confraternity of Belchite, a military order at Belchite devoted to war with Muslims.
1123		Alfonso the Battler conquered the Barcelonan city of Lleida.
1126	8 March	Urraca the Restless died in childbirth at Saldaña de Burgos. Alfonso VII the Emperor of León and Castile, her son by her first husband Raymond of Burgundy, succeeded her as king of Castile and León, though Alfonso the Battler remained in control of the former kingdom.
1127		Alfonso the Battler conquered the Almoravid city of Longares.
1127	June	Alfonso the Emperor and Alfonso the Battler signed the Peace of Támara at Támara de Campos. The treaty recognized Alfonso the Emperor's sovereignty over Castile and reestablished the 1054 border between Castile and Aragon. Alfonso the Battler renounced the title of emperor.
1129	6 April	Afonso I the Conqueror of Portugal, the count of Portugal, took the title prince.
1130	October	Siege of Bayonne: Alfonso the Battler laid siege to the Aquitainian city of Bayonne, probably with the intent of impressing Alfonso the Emperor's vassal Alfonso Jordan, the count of Toulouse.
1131	October	Alfonso the Battler drafted a will leaving his kingdom to the Knights Templar, the Knights Hospitaller, and the Order of the Holy Sepulchre.
1131	October	Siege of Bayonne: Alfonso the Battler withdrew after failing to conquer Bayonne.
1133		Alfonso the Battler conquered the Almoravid city of Mequinenza.
1134	17 July	Battle of Fraga: The Almoravids broke an Aragonese siege of Fraga. Alfonso the Battler was wounded.
1134	7 September	Alfonso the Battler died of wounds suffered at the Battle of Fraga.
1134		The Navarrese nobility elected García Ramírez of Navarre, a grandson of García Sánchez III's illegitimate son, king of Navarre.
1134		The Aragonese nobility elected Ramiro II the Monk of Aragon king of Aragon.
1135	26 May	Alfonso the Emperor took the title Imperator totius Hispaniae.
1137	11 August	Ramiro the Monk's daughter Petronilla of Aragon was betrothed to Ramon Berenguer IV the Saint, Count of Barcelona, the count of Barcelona. Under the terms of the contract, Petronilla was appointed Ramiro the Monk's heir, and in the event of her childless death, Ramon Berenguer the Saint was to inherit all her territories.
1137	13 November	Ramiro the Monk retired to the monastery, retaining the royal title but granting Ramon Berenguer the Saint royal authority under the title prince of the Aragonese people.
1138	July	Siege of Coria (1138): Alfonso the Emperor failed to take the Almoravid city of Coria, Caceres. His commanding general Rodrigo Martínez was killed in the assault.
1139	April	Siege of Oreja: Alfonso the Emperor laid siege to the Almoravid castle at Colmenar de Oreja.
1139	25 July	Battle of Ourique: Afonso defeated an Almoravid force deep inside Almoravid territory at Ourique. His soldiers proclaimed him king of Portugal.
1139	October	Siege of Oreja: The Almoravid garrison surrendered.
1141	Summer	Battle of Valdevez: Afonso invaded Galicia. Alfonso the Emperor met him at Arcos de Valdevez and was defeated.
1142	May	Siege of Coria (1142): Alfonso the Emperor laid siege to the Almoravid city of Coria, Caceres.
1142	June	Siege of Coria (1142): The Almoravid garrison surrendered.
1143	5 October	Afonso and Alfonso the Emperor signed the Treaty of Zamora in Zamora, Spain, under which the latter recognized the independence of Portugal and pledged peace between Portugal and León.
1147	October	Second Crusade: Alfonso the Emperor, Ramon Berenguer the Saint and García Ramírez, with the support of the Genoese and Pisan navies, conquered the Almoravid port city of Almería. One-third of the city was granted to Genoa, the rest to Castile.
1151		Alfonso the Emperor and Ramon Berenguer the Saint signed the Treaty of Tudilén, recognizing recent Aragonese conquests as well as any further conquests in the Taifa of Murcia.
1157		The Almohad Caliphate conquered Almería.
1157	16 August	Ramiro the Monk died. Petronilla succeeded him as queen regnant of Aragon.
1157	21 August	Alfonso the Emperor died. His kingdom was divided between his two sons. The elder, Sancho III the Desired of Castile, received Castile; the younger, Ferdinand II of León, received León.
1158	31 August	Sancho the Desired died. He was succeeded as king of Castile by his young son Alfonso VIII the Noble of Castile. A number of Castilian nobles began to vie for the regency.
1162	6 August	Ramon Berenguer the Saint died. He was succeeded as count of Barcelona by his young son Alfonso II the Chaste, the Troubadour of Aragon.
1164	18 July	Petronilla abdicated the throne of Aragon in favor of her young son Alfonso the Chaste.
1166		Alfonso the Chaste conquered the county of Provence.
1168		Alfonso the Chaste conquered Cerdanya.
1168	19 December	Alfonso the Chaste and Sancho VI the Wise of Navarre, king of Navarre, signed the Treaty of Sangüesa providing for a twenty-year truce between their countries and agreeing to a division of the Taifa of Murcia.
1171		Alfonso the Chaste conquered Teruel and Caspe.
1172		Girard II of Roussillon, count of Roussillon, died without heirs. The nobles of his county elected Alfonso the Chaste to succeed him.
1173		Alfonso the Chaste gifted Provence to his brother Ramon Berenguer III, Count of Provence.
1174		Alfonso the Noble ceded Uclés to the Order of Santiago.
1177	21 September	Castile conquered Cuenca, Spain.
1179		Alfonso the Noble and Alfonso the Chaste signed the Treaty of Cazola, setting out their respective zones of conquest in Andalusia. Aragon ceded the right to Murcia.
1188		Alfonso the Noble recognized Alfonso IX of León as king of León. In exchange, Alfonso IX recognized the supremacy of Castile over León.
1195	18 July	Battle of Alarcos: The Almohad Caliphate decisively defeated a Castilian force in what is now the province of Ciudad Real, forcing the latter's retreat to Toledo, Spain and cession of Trujillo, Cáceres, Montánchez and Talavera de la Reina.
1196	25 April	Alfonso the Chaste died. He was succeeded as king by his son Peter II the Catholic of Aragon.

== 13th century ==
Year	Date	Event	Map
1209		Albigensian Crusade: The pope Pope Innocent III called for a crusade to exterminate Catharism in Languedoc.	
1212		Alfonso the Noble, Peter the Catholic, Sancho VII the Strong, the Prudent of Navarre, king of Navarre, and the papal legate Arnaud Amalric, at the head of an army of Franks, conquered the Almohad cities of Calatrava la Vieja, Alarcos and Benavente, Zamora.	Iberian Peninsula as of 1210. Lighter blue; Almohad Caliphate. Rest of colors; Christian kingdoms.
1212	16 July	Battle of Las Navas de Tolosa: A coalition of Castilian, Aragonese, Portuguese and Navarrese forces, joined by the Order of Santiago, the Order of Calatrava, the Knights Templar and French and Leonese volunteers, decisively defeated an Almohad army in what is now the Province of Jaén. The caliph Muhammad al-Nasir was forced into flight.	
1213	12 September	Battle of Muret: Peter the Catholic was killed in battle at Muret in an attempt to reinstall his vassal Raymond VI, Count of Toulouse, count of County of Toulouse. His army was routed. Peter the Catholic was succeeded by his young son James I the Conqueror of Aragon.	
1214	5 October	Alfonso the Noble died. He was succeeded by his young son Henry I of Castile, whose elder sister Berengaria of Castile ruled as regent.	
1217	6 June	Henry I was killed by a tile falling off a roof. Berengaria succeeded him as queen regnant of Castile.	
1217	31 August	Berengaria resigned in favor of her son Ferdinand III the Saint of Castile.	
1224		The Almohad caliph Yusuf II, Almohad caliph was gored to death while playing with his pet cows, leaving no heir.	Iberian Peninsula as of 1224. Lighter blue; Almohad Caliphate. Rest of colors; Christian kingdoms.
1224		The Almohad governor of Andalusia took the majority of his forces across the Strait of Gibraltar to contest the succession to the caliphate.	
1224		An Abdallah al-Bayyasi established the Taifa of Baeza with himself at its head and appealed to Ferdinand the Saint to help him conquer Andalusia.	
1225		Siege of Jaén (1225): Castile and Baeza failed to take the city of Jaén, Spain.	
1225		Ferdinand the Saint established al-Bayyasi at Córdoba, Spain in exchange for Baños de la Encina, Capilla, Badajoz and Salvatierra Castle.	
1226	November	Al-Bayyasi was killed in Córdoba, Spain in a popular uprising. Castile annexed some of his territory including Baeza.	
1229	5 September	Conquest of Majorca: James the Conqueror led a fleet of some two hundred vessels and twenty thousand men from Salou, Cambrils and Tarragona to Majorca.	
1229	12 September	Battle of Portopí: Aragonese forces defeated an Almohad force in the Serra de Na Burguesa, forcing the latter to retreat to Palma, Majorca.	
1229	31 December	Conquest of Majorca: James the Conqueror took the last redoubt of the Almohad forces at Palma, Majorca and captured the vali Abu Yahya.	
1230		James the Conqueror issued the Llibre del Repartiment (Majorca), granting territory in Majorca according to participation in its conquest. Half became crown lands; the rest was divided primarily between Catalan and Marseillais knights and the Knights Templar.	
1230	24 June	Siege of Jaén (1230): Ferdinand the Saint laid siege to Jaén, Spain.	
1230	24 September	Alfonso IX died. He was succeeded as king of León by his son Ferdinand the Saint.	
1230	September	Siege of Jaén (1230): On hearing of the death of Alfonso IX, Ferdinand the Saint abandoned his siege of Jaén, Spain to be crowned king of León in León, Spain.	
1231		Ferdinand the Saint conquered Cazorla.	
1231		Battle of Jerez: A Castilian army defeated an army of the emir Ibn Hud near modern Jerez de la Frontera, deep in the latter's territory.	
1232		James the Conqueror conquered Menorca.	
1233		Ferdinand the Saint conquered Úbeda.	
1233	May	Siege of Burriana: James the Conqueror laid siege to Borriana, Castellón.	
1233	July	Siege of Burriana: The city fell.	
1235		James the Conqueror conquered Ibiza.	
1236	7 February	Siege of Córdoba (1236): Ferdinand the Saint arrived in Córdoba, Spain following its fall at the hands of local knights and internal fifth columnists.	
1237	15 August	Battle of the Puig: The Valencian king Zayyan ibn Mardanish met an Aragonese invasion force at El Puig, where he was decisively defeated.	
1238		Ferdinand the Saint conquered Huelva and obtained the vassalage of Niebla, Andalusia.	
1238	28 September	James the Conqueror captured Valencia and created himself king of the Kingdom of Valencia.	
1240		Ferdinand the Saint conquered Écija and Lucena, Córdoba.	
1243		Ferdinand the Saint captured Orihuela and obtained the vassalage of Murcia.	
1244	26 March	James the Conqueror signed the Treaty of Almizra, establishing Valencia's border with Castile.	
1244		Ferdinand the Saint conquered Arjona, Spain, Mula, Spain and Lorca, Spain.	
1245		Ferdinand the Saint conquered Cartagena, Spain.	
1245		Siege of Jaén (1245–46): Ferdinand the Saint, joined by the Order of Santiago, laid siege to Jaén, Spain.	
1246	28 February	Siege of Jaén (1245–46): Muhammad I of Granada, king of Granada, surrendered the city to Castile and agreed to tributary relationship. He was created king of the Kingdom of Jaén.	
1247	July	Siege of Seville: Ferdinand the Saint laid siege to Seville.	
1248		Ferdinand the Saint obtained the vassalage of Alicante.	
1248	23 November	Siege of Seville: Seville, the last Muslim polity on the Iberian Peninsula apart from the Emirate of Granada, surrendered to Castile, promising that the city would be turned over no later than the following month. Ferdinand the Saint created himself king of the Kingdom of Seville.	
1252	30 May	Ferdinand the Saint died. He was succeeded by his son Alfonso X the Wise of Castile.	
1253		Alfonso the Wise captured the Algarve from Portugal.	
1253		Alfonso the Wise gave his daughter Beatrice of Castile to the Portuguese king Afonso III of Portugal, and promised to cede the Algarve to their firstborn son on his seventh birthday.	
1256	28 January	King of the Romans William II of Holland was killed in battle with the Frisians near Hoogwoud.	
1257	15 January	Imperial election, January 1257: Richard, 1st Earl of Cornwall, count of Poitou and earl of Cornwall, was elected King of the Romans.	
1257	1 April	Imperial election, April 1257: Alfonso the Wise, who claimed the title through descent from his grandfather Philip of Swabia, was elected King of the Romans.	
1257		Alfonso the Wise debased the Castilian coinage and introduced a tariff to raise money for a campaign in support of his claim to the rule of the Holy Roman Empire, against that of Richard.	
1261		Siege of Jerez (1261): Castile and Granada laid siege to Jerez de la Frontera.	
1261		Siege of Jerez (1261): The citizens of Jerez de la Frontera agreed to resume tribute payments to Castile.	
1262		James the Conqueror created the Kingdom of Majorca in his will.	
1262		Niebla, Andalusia was incorporated into Castile.	Iberian Peninsula as of 1262 after Niebla, Andalusia was incorporated into Castile.
1264		Mudéjar revolt of 1264–1266: The Muslim subjects of Castile, encouraged by Muhammad I, rebelled in Andalusia and Murcia.	
1264	8 August	Mudéjar revolt of 1264–1266: Nuño González de Lara, head of the Castilian garrison at Jerez de la Frontera, fled his post. The Alcázar of Jerez de la Frontera was taken.	
1264	9 October	Mudéjar revolt of 1264–1266: Castilian forces retook Jerez de la Frontera.	
1265	28 August	The Siete Partidas, a code of law, was completed in Castile.	
1265	October	Conquest of Murcia (1265–66): James the Conqueror entered Muslim-held territory in support of the Castilian suppression of the Mudéjar revolt.	
1266	2 January	Conquest of Murcia (1265–66): James the Conqueror laid siege to Murcia.	
1266	31 January	Conquest of Murcia (1265–66): Murcia surrendered.	
1266	26 February	Battle of Benevento: Manfred, King of Sicily, the king of Sicily, was killed during the conquest of the kingdom by Charles I of Anjou, count of Anjou.	
1266		Alicante was incorporated into Castile.	
1267	16 February	Alfonso the Wise and Afonso III signed the Treaty of Badajoz, a pact of friendship and mutual assistance. The treaty established the border between Castile and Portugal to the latter's disadvantage.	
1272		The Castilian nobility rebelled against Alfonso the Wise following his mismanagement of the economy.	
1275		Battle of Écija (1275): Granadan forces routed a Castilian army moving through their territory to meet a Marinid advance.	
1276	27 July	James the Conqueror died. He was succeeded as king of Aragon and Valencia and count of Barcelona by one son, Peter III the Great of Aragon, and as king of Majorca by another, James II of Majorca.	
1278	July	Siege of Algeciras (1278–79): Castile laid siege to the Marinid port city of Algeciras.	
1278	25 July	Battle of Algeciras (1278): A combined Marinid-Granadan fleet destroyed the Castilian navy in the Strait of Gibraltar.	
1279		James II agreed by treaty to become a vassal of Aragon.	
1279	5 August	Siege of Algeciras (1278–79): A Marinid force destroyed the Castilian navy in port in the Bay of Gibraltar and captured and executed the soldiers besieging the city.	
1280	23 June	Battle of Moclín (1280): A force consisting of Castilian soldiers and most of the Order of Santiago was wiped out by a Granadan army at Moclín while returning from a raid.	
1282		Alfonso the Wise, facing military pressure from his nobility, was forced to accept his son Sancho IV the Brave of Castile as his heir.	
1282	30 March	Sicilian Vespers: A number of French officers were killed by locals in rioting near Palermo.	
1282		War of the Sicilian Vespers: Sicilian rebels appealed to Peter the Great to overthrow Charles of Anjou's administration and rule by right of his wife Constance of Sicily, Queen of Aragon, Manfred's daughter.	
1283	8 July	Battle of Malta: An Aragonese fleet surprised and sank a Neapolitan fleet in the Grand Harbour, delaying the latter's planned invasion of Sicily.	
1284	2 February	Aragonese Crusade: The pope Pope Martin IV called for a crusade against Peter the Great, and declared him deposed in Aragon in favor of Charles, Count of Valois, the count of Valois.	
1284	4 April	Alfonso the Wise died. He was succeeded by Sancho the Brave, though his will appointed his grandson Alfonso de la Cerda his successor in León.	
1284	5 June	Battle of the Gulf of Naples: The Aragonese and Sicilian navies drew out a Neapolitan fleet in the Gulf of Naples and captured Charles of Anjou as well as some ten galleys.	
1285	4 September	Battle of Les Formigues: A Sicilian-Aragonese fleet decisively defeated the French and Genoans, probably near the Formigues Islands.	
1285	30 September	Battle of the Col de Panissars: An Aragonese force massacred the French army during its retreat over the Pyrenees.	
1285	11 November	Peter the Great died at Vilafranca del Penedès. He was succeeded as king of Aragon by his eldest son Alfonso III the Liberal, the Free of Aragon and as king of Sicily by his second son James II the Just of Aragon.	
1285		Alfonso the Liberal conquered Mallorca.	
1286		Alfonso the Liberal conquered Ibiza.	
1287	17 January	Alfonso the Liberal conquered Menorca and annexed it to the Kingdom of Majorca, dissolving its autonomous government.	
1287	23 June	Battle of the Counts: A Sicilian-Aragonese fleet defeated a superior Angevin force at Naples, breaking the latter's attempted invasion of Sicily.	
1287	20 December	The Union of Aragon, a political organization of nobles and townspeople in Aragon, won the Privilege of the Union, a devolution of many royal powers to the Aragonese nobility, from Alfonso the Liberal.	
1288		Alfonso the Liberal released Alfonso de la Cerda from captivity in the fortress at Xàtiva and declared him king of Castile and León.	
1291	19 February	Aragonese Crusade: The pope Pope Nicholas IV, Philip IV the Fair, the Iron King of France, king of France, Charles II the Lame of Naples, king of Naples, and Alfonso the Liberal signed the Treaty of Tarascon, ending the crusade. Alfonso the Liberal agreed to remove all Aragonese troops from Sicily. In return, the pope recognized him as king of Aragon and lifted his excommunication.	
1291	18 June	Alfonso the Liberal died. He was succeeded by James the Just.	
1295		Battle of Iznalloz: The Emirate of Granada expelled a Castilian garrison and the Order of Calatrava from their fortress overlooking the border at Iznalloz.	
1295	25 April	Sancho the Brave died of tuberculosis in Toledo, Spain. He was succeeded by his young son Ferdinand IV the Summoned of Castile as king of Castile and León, with his wife María de Molina acting as regent.	
1295	20 June	The pope Pope Boniface VIII, James the Just, Philip the Fair, Charles the Lame and James II of Majorca signed the Treaty of Anagni. Under the treaty, James the Just granted Sicily to the pope, who in turn gifted it to Charles the Lame, and agreed to aid the latter in its reconquest.	
1295		War of the Sicilian Vespers: The people of Sicily rejected the Treaty of Anagni and acclaimed James the Just's younger brother Frederick III of Sicily their king.	
1296	April	Aragonese troops invaded Castile in support of Alfonso de la Cerda's claim to the throne.	
1296		John of Castile, Lord of Valencia de Campos, a son of Alfonso the Wise, was crowned king of León, Seville and Galicia in León, Spain.	
1296		Alfonso de la Cerda was crowned king of Castile, Toledo, Córdoba, Murcia and Jaén at Sahagún.	
1297	13 September	María de Molina and Denis of Portugal, king of Portugal signed the Treaty of Alcañices. Denis agreed to support Ferdinand the Summoned against the rebels Alfonso de la Cerda and John of Castile and to give him the hand of his daughter Constance of Portugal in marriage. In exchange, he received some Castilian territory along the Portuguese border.	
1299	4 July	Battle of Cape Orlando: An Aragonese-Angevin fleet defeated the Sicilian navy near Sicily.	
1299	1 December	Battle of Falconaria: A Sicilian fleet decisively defeated the Neapolitan navy off the shore between Marsala and Trapani and captured its commander, Charles the Lame's son Philip I, Prince of Taranto.	
1300	14 June	Battle of Ponza (1300): An Aragonese-Angevin fleet defeated a Sicilian one near Ponza.	
1300	26 June	John of Castile renounced his royal titles and declared his fealty to Ferdinand the Summoned.	

== 14th century ==
Year	Date	Event
1331		In the city of Alicante, Moorish forces attempted a siege.
1339		The Treaty of Madrid was signed in Madrid.
1366		A civil war was started against Enrique de Trastamara, son of Alfonso XI.

== 15th century ==
Year	Date	Event
1469	19 October	Isabella I of Castile and Ferdinand II of Aragon were married, laying the foundation for the unification of the kingdoms of Castile and Aragon into Spain.
1474	10 December	The reign of Isabella began.
1475		The War of the Castilian Succession began. Vasco Nunez de Balboa was born.
1478		The Spanish Inquisition was founded.
1479		War of the Castilian Succession: The war ended.
1479	20 January	The reign of Ferdinand began, marking the foundation of the Kingdom of Spain.
1479	4 September	By the Treaty of Alcáçovas, Portugal recognized Spanish control of the Canary Islands.
1492	12 October	Spanish conquerors discover (encounter) America
1492		The Reconquista ended.
1492		Jews were expelled from Spain by the Alhambra Decree.
1492	3 August	Columbus sets sail.
1493		Spanish colonization of the Americas began.
1494		The Treaty of Tordesillas was signed.
1499		Italian War of 1499–1504: Ferdinand allied with the French King Louis XII of France.

== 16th century ==
Year	Date	Event	
1501	April	The Rebellion of the Alpujarras (1499–1501), a series of uprisings by the Muslim population of the Kingdom of Granada against their Catholic rulers was defeated.	
1504		Isabella I of Castile died. Her daughter, Joanna of Castile succeeded her with her father, Ferdinand as regent	
1506		Christopher Columbus died at the age of 51 from an illness.	
1512		Spanish conquest of Iberian Navarre began.	
1516		Ferdinand died.	
1516		Charles V, Holy Roman Emperor, became King of Castile and Aragon.	
1519		Vasco Nunez de Balboa died.	
1535	8 March	New Spain began till 1821.	
1554	25 July	English Queen Mary I of England married Spanish Prince Philip.	
1556		Charles abdicated in favor of Philip, who became King Philip II of Spain.	
1557		Battle of St. Quentin (1557): Spain won the battle.	
1561		Philip moved his court to Madrid.	
1568		Dutch Revolt: A revolt began against Habsburg control of the Netherlands. This started the Eighty Years' War	
1571	7 October	Battle of Lepanto (1571): The Holy League was victorious.	
1578		Dutch Revolt: The revolt ended.	
1580	25 August	The Iberian Union of the crowns of Aragon, Castile and Portugal was established.	The realms of Philip II of Spain Territories administered by the Council of Castile Territories administered by the Council of Aragon Territories administered by the Council of Portugal Territories administered by the Council of Italy Territories administered by the Council of the Indies Territories appointed to the Council of Flanders Philip's European and North African dominions as of 1580
1581	26 July	Dutch Republic, the Republic of the Seven United Netherlands, declared their independence against Spanish rule.	
1585		Anglo–Spanish War (1585): The war began. It was an intermittent conflict	
1588	8 August	The Spanish Armada was defeated in the English Channel.	
1589		The English Armada (known as the Counter Armada) was defeated.	
1598	13 September	Philip II died in El Escorial, near Madrid, of cancer. He was succeeded by his 20-year-old son, Philip III.	

== 17th century ==
Year	Date	Event
1604		Anglo-Spanish War (1585): The war ends with the treaty of London, which is beneficial to both the Spanish and the English side.
1605		The Treaty of London (1604) was signed concluding the nineteen-year Anglo-Spanish War on peace terms.
1609	April 9	The Expulsion of the Moriscos was decreed. The Moriscos were descendants of Spain's Muslim population that had converted to Christianity in the early 16th century.
1618		Thirty Years' War: The war, one of the most destructive conflicts in human history, began.
1621		Philip IV of Spain was crowned.
1640		Portuguese Restoration War: The war began.
1640		The Iberian Union was dissolved.
1648		The Treaty of Westphalia was signed. Habsburg supremacy was curtailed. Recognition of the independence of the Dutch Republic by the Spanish Empire. Recognition of Spanish sovereignty of Southern Netherlands and Luxembourg by the Dutch Republic.
1659		The Peace of the Pyrenees was signed to end the 1635–1659 war between France and Spain. Spain lost French Flanders and northern part of the Principality of Catalonia.
1665		Philip IV died. The Spanish Empire had reached approximately 12.2 million square kilometers (4.7 million square miles) in area
1668		The Treaty of Lisbon was signed. Spain recognized the sovereignty of Portugal's new ruling dynasty, the House of Braganza.
1675		Charles II of Spain, the last Habsburg ruler of the Spanish Empire, was crowned.
1700	1 November	Charles II died childless .
1700		House of Bourbon began with Philip V.

== 18th century ==
Year	Date	Event	Map
1701		War of the Spanish Succession: The war began.	Europe in 1701 at the beginning of the War of the Spanish Succession. Colour Grey: Spanish Monarchy (Crown of Castile, Crown of Aragon, Spanish viceroyalty of Naples and Sicily, Duchy of Milan and Spanish Netherlands).
1707	29 June	Nueva Planta decrees: Kingdom of Spain as an absolute monarchy and a centralized state, abolishing the political differences of the two crowns (Crown of Castile, Crown of Aragon).	
1713		Peace of Utrecht till 1715. The Kingdom of Spain lost Spanish Netherlands, Spanish viceroyalty of Naples and Sicily, Duchy of Milan, Menorca and Gibraltar.	
1717	27 May	Viceroyalty of New Granada began.	
1761		Seven Years' War: Spain declared war on Great Britain.	
1763	10 February	Treaty of Paris. Spain recovers Florida and obtains Louisiana till 1801.	
1778		American Revolutionary War: Spain supported the United States.	
1789		Spain during this time opened up the slave trade to Havana.	
1790		Spanish base in Nootka Sound. Maximum extension of the Spanish Empire.	Spanish Empire as of 1790..

== 19th century ==
Year	Date	Event	Map
1801		Louisiana given to France	
1806		British invasions of the Río de la Plata: The invasions began.	
1807		British invasions of the Río de la Plata: The invasions ended.	
1808		Peninsular War: The war began.	Military campaign of Napoleonic troops in Spain (1808–1812). Dark blue: Territories annexed by France
1808	2 May	Dos de Mayo Uprising: An uprising took place in Madrid against the French occupation of the city.	
1809		Bolivian Independence War: The war began.	
1811		Venezuelan War of Independence: The war began.	
1812		The Spanish Constitution of 1812 was issued.	
1814		Peninsular War: The war ended.	
1815		Spanish reconquest of New Granada: The reconquest began.	
1816		Spanish reconquest of New Granada: The reconquest ended.	
1820		Trienio Liberal: The period began.	
1823		Trienio Liberal: The period ended.	
1824		Bolivian Independence War: The war ended.	
1833		First Carlist War: The war began.	
1839		First Carlist War: The war ended.	
1846		Second Carlist War: The war began.	
1849		Second Carlist War: The war ended.	
1864		Chincha Islands War: The war began.	
1866		Chincha Islands War: The war ended.	
1868		Ten Years' War: A war with Cuba began.	
1872		Third Carlist War: The war began.	
1873		The First Spanish Republic was established.	
1874		Spain under the Restoration: The period began.	
1874		The First Spanish Republic was disestablished.	
1876		Third Carlist War: The war ended.	
1878		Ten Years' War: The war ended.	
1879		Pablo Iglesias founds the Partido Socialista Obrero Español or PSOE in Casa Labra, a bar from Madrid	
1898	25 April	Spanish–American War: The war began.	Spanish Empire as of 1898.
1898	12 August	Spanish–American War: The war ended.	

== 20th century ==
Year	Date	Event	Map
1912	27 November	Spanish protectorate in Morocco till 1956.	Pink: Spanish Morocco. Red: Spain and Spanish colonies.
1914	28 July	Spain remained neutral throughout World War I.	
1920		Rif War: The war began.	
1923	13 September	Dictatorship of Primo de Rivera till 1930.	
1927	10 July	Rif War: The war ended.	
1931	9 December	The Second Spanish Republic was established.	
1931		Spain under the Restoration: The period ended.	
1936		Spanish Civil War (to 1939)	Brown: Initial Nationalist zone – July 1936
1939		Francoist Spain: The period began. Spain stays neutral through World War II	
1953		Spain and the United States signs the Pact of Madrid.	
1955		Spain joins the United Nations.	
1959		Spanish miracle: A period of economic growth began.	
1973		Spanish miracle: The period ended.	
1975		History of Spain (1975–present)	
1975	6 November	The Green March forced Spain to hand over its last remaining colonial possession, Spanish Sahara, to Morocco.	
1975	20 November	Francisco Franco died; the monarchy was restored to Juan Carlos I.	
1976	18 November	Spanish transition to democracy: The transition began.	
1977	15 June	First democratic election since 1934.	
1978	27 December	The Spanish Constitution of 1978 was signed by the King.	Autonomous communities of Spain
1981		Spanish society after the democratic transition: A democratic society was established.	
1981	23 February	1981 Spanish coup attempt: An attempted coup took place.	
1982		Spain joins NATO.	
1986		Spain joined the European Union.	
1992	July – August	1992 Summer Olympics: The Summer Olympics were held in Barcelona.	
1997	July	Spain hosts the 1997 Madrid summit.	
1998		Judge Baltasar Garzón issued an international arrest warrant for former Chilean dictator Augusto Pinochet.	
1999	1 January	Spain joins Economic and Monetary Union of the European Union. Euro is a real currency, and a single monetary policy is introduced under the authority of the ECB.	Eurozone as of 2023. Blue color: Members of the Eurozone. Rest of colors: Members of the European Union outside the Eurozone.

== 21st century ==
Year	Date	Event
2003	22 August	Fernando Alonso wins the Hungarian Grand Prix, marking him F1's youngest winner.
2004	11 March	2004 Madrid train bombings: Madrid train bombings killed one hundred and ninety-one and injured over two thousand. Prime Minister José María Aznar blamed the Basque terrorists ETA.
2004	14 March	Aznar's People's Party lost an election after the Partido Social-Obrero Español of José Luis Rodríguez Zapatero promised to withdraw Spanish troops from Iraq.
2005		PADICAT (archive) established.
2005	25 September	Fernando Alonso wins the Championship against Kimi Räikkönen in Brazil, marking him F1's youngest world champion.
2006	30 December	2006 Madrid–Barajas Airport bombing: A bombing by ETA ended an active ceasefire and peace negotiations.
2008		Moroccan national Jamal Zougam was found guilty of the 2004 train bombings in Madrid.
2008		Garzón was charged with criminal conduct in three cases, causing an international scandal and protests.
2008		Spain won the UEFA European Championship Final, establishing the team as an international soccer power house.
2010	July	Spain won the FIFA World Cup.
2010		Garzón was granted leave to work as a consultant to the International Criminal Court at The Hague.
2015		Artur Mas defies Spain by calling early elections on independence of the region of Catalonia.
2017	17–18 August	2017 Barcelona attacks: Barcelona, Cambrils, Alcanar and Subirats were attacked by terrorists from Islamic State of Iraq and the Levant (ISIL).
2017	1 October	2017 Catalan independence referendum: An unconstitutional referendum of independence were called by Generalitat de Catalunya, as Parliament of Catalonia approved the Law on the Referendum of Self-determination of Catalonia. In early September the High Court of Justice of Catalonia had issued orders to the police to try to prevent it, including the detention of various persons responsible for its preparation.
2017	27 October	Catalan declaration of independence: Catalan unilateral declaration of independence was ratified by Parliament of Catalonia as the results of the referendum were in favor. Spain considers this action illegal and article 155 of the constitution was applied.
2017	29 October	Carles Puigdemont flee from Spain to avoid being arrested after his dismissal by Spain, after proclaiming the independence of Catalonia.
2018	June	Pedro Sánchez is sworn in as Prime Minister after winning a motion of censure.
2019		Trial of Catalonia independence leaders: Takes place over several months, following the 2017 declaration of independence of Catalonia. Nine defendants sentenced to 9 to 13 years in prison on sedition and misuse of public funds charges; three other defendants fined for disobedience. This sparked subsequent protests by independence citizens.
2020	13 January	Sánchez II Government: It become the first nationwide coalition government to be formed in Spain since the Second Spanish Republic. The parties were Spanish Socialist Workers' Party (PSOE) and Unidas Podemos.
2020	31 January	COVID-19 pandemic starts in Spain with the first confirmated case in La Gomera (Canary Islands). You can view the confirmed cases, recovered and deaths in this link: COVID-19 pandemic in Spain.
2022	28 June	Spain hosts the 2022 Madrid Summit.

== See also ==
- Timeline of Catalan history
