= Gonzalo Téllez =

Nobleman (??–c.915)

Gonzalo Téllez (died c. 915) was a nobleman who was Count of Lantarón and Cerezo (c. 897–c. 915) and is also mentioned in a document dated 903 as Count of Castile. He and his wife were the founders of the Monastery of San Pedro de Arlanza.

== Tenencias and estates, military campaigns and repopulation ==
Because of the relentless incursions of the armies of the Emirate of Córdoba from the end of the 8th-century against the counties of Castile and Álava, which intensified in the first decades of the 9th-century, it became necessary to build several defensive fortifications, including those at Cerezo in Castile and at Lantarón and Astúlez in Álava. The first mention of a count governing Álava exclusively dates to 882 when Vela Jiménez appears as tenente of the region, which was possibly governed previously by Count Rodrigo of Castile.

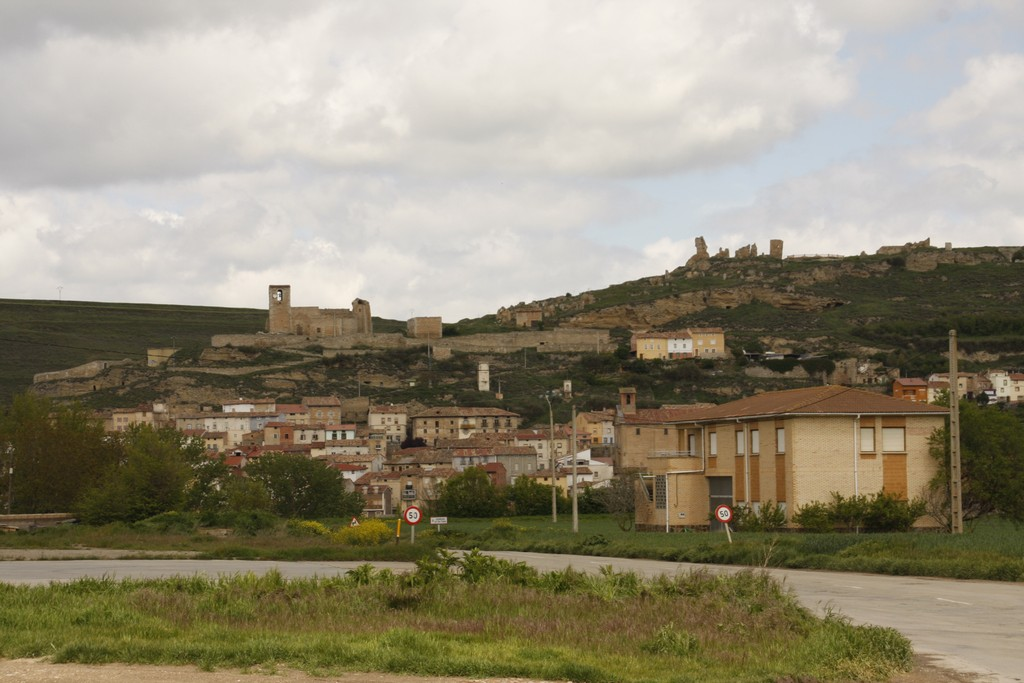
View of Cerezo de Río Tirón

Near the end of his reign, King Alfonso III of Asturias (866–910) reorganized these easternmost lands and divided them into counties, appointing as governors of each of these his most trusted counts. Gonzalo Téllez was one of these counts and was entrusted with the government of Cerezo and Lantarón, the latter being particularly important because of its strategic location from where the count was able to control access to the valley of the Omecillo and the land along the banks of the River Ebro adjacent to Miranda.

Following the death of the Emir of Córdoba Abdullah ibn Muhammad al-Umawi in 912, his successor Abd-ar-Rahman III first had to dedicate his efforts to quashing the rebels of Al-Andalus. King García I of León seized the opportunity and in 913 went to the eastern march of the Kingdom of León, (Note: This name had supplanted that of Asturias.) to the dominions of Count Gonzalo. From there, his armies advanced towards La Rioja and conquered Nájera and Calahorra, and laid siege to Arnedo, which resisted. Nevertheless, the Christian troops soon withdrew, possibly because the king had become seriously ill.

Besides Vela Jiménez and Gonzalo Téllez, and until 992 when Count Fernán González of Castile began to govern Álava, three other counts were tenentes of the Álava region: Munio Vélaz, Fernando Díaz and Álvaro Herraméliz. None of them were counts of Castile or Burgos.

Count Gonzalo's estates were situated in the Pedernales area, an uninhabited land a short distance from Burgos that was later incorporated into the current town of Villagonzalo Pedernales, which bears his name, and in the valley of the Omecillo River, between Tobillas and San Zadornil. His dominions stretched from the Nervión to Sierra de la Demanda with the fortresses Lantarón, Pancorbo and Cerezo. From there, he could protect the eastern frontier against Muslim raids, particularly those of the Banu Qasi.

Gonzalo is first documented in a charter dated 18 November 897 (lost, but quoted by Gregorio de Argaiz), which mentions that King Alfonso III reigned in Oviedo (the capital of Asturias) and Count Gonzalo Téllez in Lantarón. On 24 September 902, Gonzalo and his wife Flámula (also called Lambra in other documents) made a donation to the Monastery of San Pedro de Cardeña consisting of agricultural land in Pedernales. A year later, on 1 September 903, he appears as Gondesalbo Telluz in Castella, the only time that he is mentioned as Count of Castile.

In 912, Gonzalo Téllez was one of the three counts that King García entrusted with the repopulation of the land along the banks of the Duero River: Munio Núñez repopulated Roa; Gonzalo Fernández brought settlers to Burgos, Clunia and San Esteban de Gormaz; and Gonzalo Téllez settled Osma.

In a charter dated 25 October 913, where Gonzalo and Flámula made a donation to the abbot of the Monastery of San Jorge, San Juan y San Martín de Cerezo, he appears as governing Cerezo (regnante principe Garseani in Legione et comite Gundisssalbo Telliz in Cerasio).

== Founding of the Monastery of San Pedro de Arlanza ==
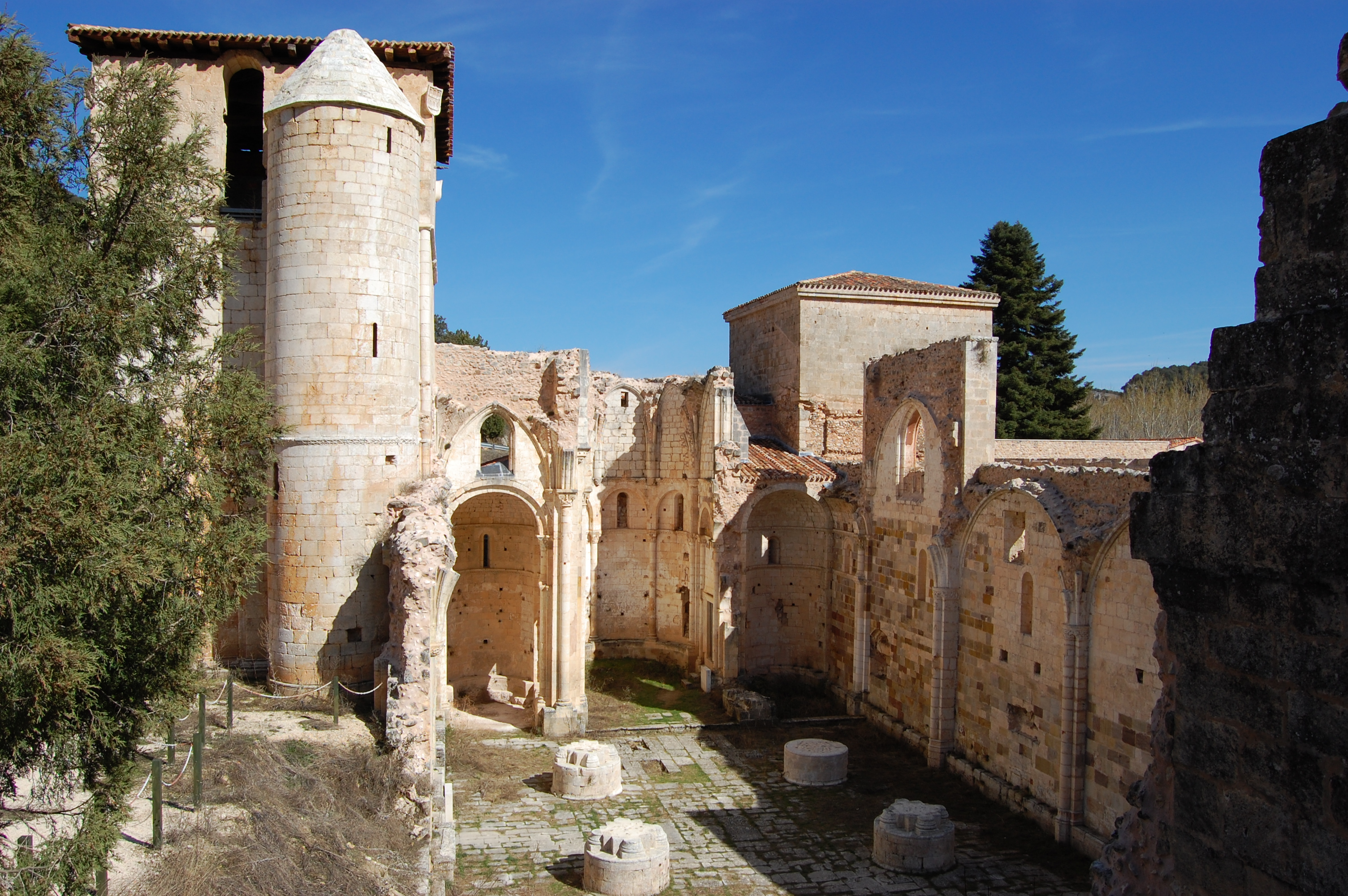
Ruins of the Monastery of San Pedro de Arlanza founded by Count Gonzalo Téllez and his wife Flámula

Gonzalo Téllez and his wife Flámula appear in the foundational document of the Monastery of San Pedro de Arlanza on 12 January 913. The charter was also signed by Muniadona, the mother of Count Fernán González, with her son Ramiro. Historian Justo Pérez de Urbel suggested that Muniadona and Gonzalo's wife, Flámula, were sisters, but the two charters on which he based this hypothesis are clearly spurious. Although the founding of the monastery is attributed in later historiography to Count Fernán González, its actual founder was Count Gonzalo Téllez.

Gonzalo last appears in a document of 25 February 915, through which he donated Cótar to the Monastery of San Pedro de Cardeña. He probably died between that date and May 919 when Munio Vélaz, possibly a son of Vela Jiménez, appears as Count of Álava. There is no record of Gonzalo having any descendants. His wife was still alive in November 929 when she made a donation to the monastery that they had founded for the soul of her deceased husband.

== Bibliography ==
- Escalona, Julio (2012). "Épica y falsificaciones documentales en la Castilla medieval". Antigüedad y cristianismo. Monografías históricas sobre las Antigüedad Tardía. Realidad, ficción y autenticidad en el Mundo Antiguo: La investigación ante documentos sospechosos (in Spanish) (29). Universidad de Murcia: 223–242. ISSN 0214-7165.
- Martín Viso, Iñaki (2002). "Poder político y estructura social en la Castilla altomedieval: el condado de Lantarón (Siglos VIII-XI)" (PDF). Los espacios de poder en la España medieval: XII Semana de Estudios Medievales, Nájera, del 30 de julio al 3 de agosto de 2001 (in Spanish). Logroño: Gobierno de La Rioja, Instituto de Estudios Riojanos. pp. 533–552. ISBN 84-95747-24-3.
- Martínez Díez, Gonzalo (2005). El Condado de Castilla (711-1038). La historia frente a la leyenda. Valladolid: Junta de Castilla y León. ISBN 84-9718-275-8.
- Moreta, Salustiano; Moreta Velayos, Salustiano (1971). El Monasterio de San Pedro de Cardeña. Historia de un dominio monástico (in Spanish). Salamanca: Universidad de Salamanca. ISBN 9788474819243. OCLC 48277151.
- Pérez de Urbel, Justo (1945). Historia del Condado de Castilla (in Spanish). Vol. I. Madrid: Consejo Superior de Investigaciones Científicas. OCLC 807132337.
- Rodríguez Fernández, Justiniano (1997). Reyes de León (I). García I, Ordoño II, Fruela II y Alfonso IV (in Spanish). Burgos: La Olmeda. ISBN 84-920046-8-1.
