= List of Castilian counts =

This is a list of counts of Castile.

The County of Castile had its origin in a fortified march on the eastern frontier of the Kingdom of Asturias. The earliest counts were not hereditary, being appointed as representatives of the Asturian king. From as early as 867, with the creation of the County of Álava, Castile was subdivided into several smaller counties that were not reunited until 931. In the later 10th-century, while nominally in vassalage to the Kingdom of León, the counts grew in autonomy and played a significant role in Iberian politics. After the assassination in 1029 of Count García Sánchez of Castile, King Sancho III of Pamplona, because of his marriage to Muniadona, García's sister, governed the county although he never held the title of count: it was his son, Ferdinand Sánchez, the future King Ferdinand I of León who inherited the county from his mother.

Near the end of 1063, (Note: "...probably on 22 December [1063], the day on which the Basilica of San Isidoro was consecrated, Ferdinand I, announced before the large number of magnates and bishops who went to León for the occasion, his decision to divide the kingdom among his sons to avoid future discord upon his death." (translation)) Fernando I convened the Curia regis to announce his testamentary dispositions pursuant to which he had decided to divide his dominions among his sons. His firstborn, Sancho, became the first king of the former county and reigned as Sancho II of Castile.

== Counts of Castile ==
=== The early, non-hereditary counts ===
- Rodrigo (850–873),. He could have also been count in Álava
- Diego Rodríguez Porcelos (873–885)
- Munio Núñez (c.899–c.901)
- Gonzalo Téllez (903), mentioned only once, in 903, as Count of Castile. He was also count in Cerezo and Lantarón
- Munio Núñez (again, c.904–c.909)
- Gonzalo Fernández of Castile (c. 912–c. 916), "...most probably Gonzalo was Count of Burgos from 899 to 915 and, as from 912 until 915, also Count of Castile". He probably died after 915, when he still appears governing the county, and before 13 November 917 when a Fernando is recorded as Count of Castile.
- Ferdinand (917). Appears without a patronymic. Could have been Fernando Díaz, who on 8 January 918 confirms a charter as Fredinandus Didazi, comes, or Ferdinand Ansúrez who appears in 929 with this title.
- Nuño Fernández (c. 922–c. 926) On 13 September 922 appears as Count of Burgos and on 25 February 926 appears as Comite Nunu Fredinandiz in Castella. Although there is no documentary evidence, Nuño was probably the brother of Gonzalo Fernández of Castile.
- Ferdinand Ansúrez (c.926–c.929) Recorded as Count of Castile on 1 October and 24 November 929.
- Gutier Núñez (931), probably son of Nuño Fernández, appears as Count of Burgos on 1 March 931. (Note: "...from at least 899 until 931, the counties of Castile and Burgos are clearly differentiated, even though governed sometimes by the same individual (...) united or separate, with the only exception of the County of Castile in 929, they were governed by members of the same family: such as Munio Núñez, or his nephews, the brothers Gonzalo and Nuño Fernández or the son of the latter, Gutier Núñez.)

=== Semi-autonomous, hereditary counts ===
Following the appointment of Fernán González in 931 to succeed both Gutier Núñez and Álvaro Herraméliz, he reunited the divided counties of Castile, Burgos, Álava, Cerezo and Lantarón into what would become a single semi-autonomous hereditary county of Castile. Al Andalus sources referred to the family as the Beni Mamaduna, the descendants of Muniadona de Lara, Fernán's mother.

- Fernán González (931–970), son of Gonzalo Fernández, married Sancha Sánchez, widow of Álvaro Herrameliz.
  - Ansur Fernández (944–947), son of Ferdinand Ansúrez, in opposition to Fernán González during the latter's rebellion, father-in-law of Sancho I of León
- García Fernández (970–995), son of Fernán González
- Sancho García (995–1017), son of García Fernández
- García Sánchez (1017–1029), son of Sancho García.

=== Jiménez Dynasty ===
With the death of Garcia Sánchez, the county of Castile passed to the family of his eldest sister, Muniadona of Castile, wife of Sancho III of Pamplona. Sancho thus became de facto ruler of Castile, though he was never its count, nominating his younger son to succeed Garcia.

- Ferdinand Sánchez (1029-1065), who continued to serve as count of Castile after he became king Ferdinand I of León. (Note: "We can and must state with absolute certainty the fact that Ferdinand was never King of Castile, and that [Castile] never changed its nature as a county, subordinated to the King of León, and that it did not become a kingdom until the death of Ferdinand I in the year 1065" (translation)) On his death, Castile was elevated to a kingdom for his firstborn son, Sancho, who ruled as Sancho II of Castile.

== See also ==
- List of Asturian monarchs
- List of Castilian monarchs
- List of Castilian consorts
- List of Leonese monarchs
- List of Navarrese monarchs
- List of Spanish monarchs

== Bibliography ==
- Martínez Díez, Gonzalo (2005). El Condado de Castilla (711–1038): La historia frente a la leyenda. Valladolid: Junta de Castilla y León. ISBN 84-9718-275-8.
- Martínez Díez, Gonzalo (2007). Sancho III el Mayor Rey de Pamplona, Rex Ibericus (in Spanish). Madrid: Marcial Pons Historia. ISBN 978-84-96467-47-7.
- Pérez de Urbel, Justo (1945). Historia del Condado de Castilla. Madrid: Consejo Superior de Investigaciones Científicas. OCLC 5661964.
- Sánchez Candeira, Alfonso (1999). Rosa Montero Tejada (ed.). Castilla y León en el siglo XI, estudio del reinado de Fernando I (in Spanish). Madrid: Real Academia de la Historia. ISBN 978-84-8951241-2.
- Torres Sevilla-Quiñones de León, Margarita Cecilia (1999). Linajes nobiliarios de León y Castilla: Siglos IX-XIII. Salamanca: Junta de Castilla y León, Consejería de educación y cultura. ISBN 84-7846-781-5.
