= Munio Vélaz =

Munio Vélaz or Vigílaz (died before 931) was the Count of Álava and probably also of Biscay. The exact dates of his countship are unknown. Only one document, dated 18 May 919 in the cartularies of Valpuesta, names Munio as count in Álava. He ruled between counts Gonzalo Téllez (last seen as count in 913) and Fernando Díaz (first seen in 923). The counts of Álava are described variously in contemporary documents as ruling "in" Álava, Lantarón or Cerezo. The next count after Munio described as ruling Álava proper is Álvaro Herraméliz in 929. They governed the eastern borderlands of the kingdom of León on behalf of the crown.

Munio's patronymic surname, Vélaz or Vigílaz, indicates that his father was named Vela, but no genealogical information about Munio has survived. Geography, chronology and onomastics suggest that he may have been a son of Vela Jiménez, who was the count of Álava during the battles of Cellorigo in 882–83.

The document of 18 May 919 shows Munio presiding over a lawsuit between the monastery of Valpuesta (now lost, but possibly located in Álava) and the church of Santa María del Puerto in Santoña. The dispute centred around some property in Espejo in Valdegovía in Álava. The dating clause of the charter indicates places it during the reign of "lord Ordoño in León and count Munio Vélaz in Álava". (Note: The document reads: "...domino Ordonio in Legione et comite Monnio Uigilazi in Alaba...") This document has been used to argue that not only Espejo, but Valpuesta itself, along with the castle of Lantarón and the valleys of Losa, Mena and Tobalina, belonged to Munio's county, if not also Cellorigo, Grañón and Cerezo.

The Códice de Roda, a document from the neighbouring kingdom of Pamplona, states that "Lady Velasquita [daughter of King Sancho I of Pamplona] was the wife of the Biscayne count, Lord Munio, and [by him] she had children [named] Aznar Muñoz, Lope Muñoz, Sancho Muñoz and [like her] Lady Velasquita." (Note: The document reads: "Domna Belasquita uxor fuit Momi comitis Bizcahiensis et genuit filios Azenari Momiz et Lupo Momiz hac Sanzio Momi, et domna Belasquita.") Velasquita's sister, Sancha, married Álvaro Herraméliz. It is very likely that this Munio (or Momo) who was count of Biscay is the same person as the count of Álava. Munio Vélaz died before 931, probably shortly after his only appearance in 919. His wife, Velasquita Sánchez, outlived him. She contracted a second marriage with Galindo, son of Count Bernard I of Ribagorza, and a third with Fortún Galíndez. There is no record of her and Munio's children outside of the Genealogies.

== Sources ==
- Lacarra de Miguel, José María (1945). "Textos navarros del Códice de Roda". Estudios de Edad Media de la Corona de Aragón. 1: 193–284. OCLC 694519776.
- Martínez Díez, Gonzalo (2005). El condado de Castilla (711-1038): la historia frente a la leyenda (in Spanish). Vol. I. Valladolid: Marcial Pons. Historia. ISBN 84-9718-276-6.
- Pérez de Urbel, Justo (1945). Historia del condado de Castilla. Madrid: Consejo Superior de Investigaciones Científicas.
- Salazar y Acha, Jaime de (1985). Una Familia de la Alta Edad Media: Los Velas y su Realidad Histórica. Asociación Española de Estudios Genealógicos y Heráldicos. ISBN 84-398-3591-4.

Preceded by Gonzalo Téllez	Count of Álava c. 919	Succeeded by Álvaro Herraméliz
