= Munio Núñez =

Nobleman

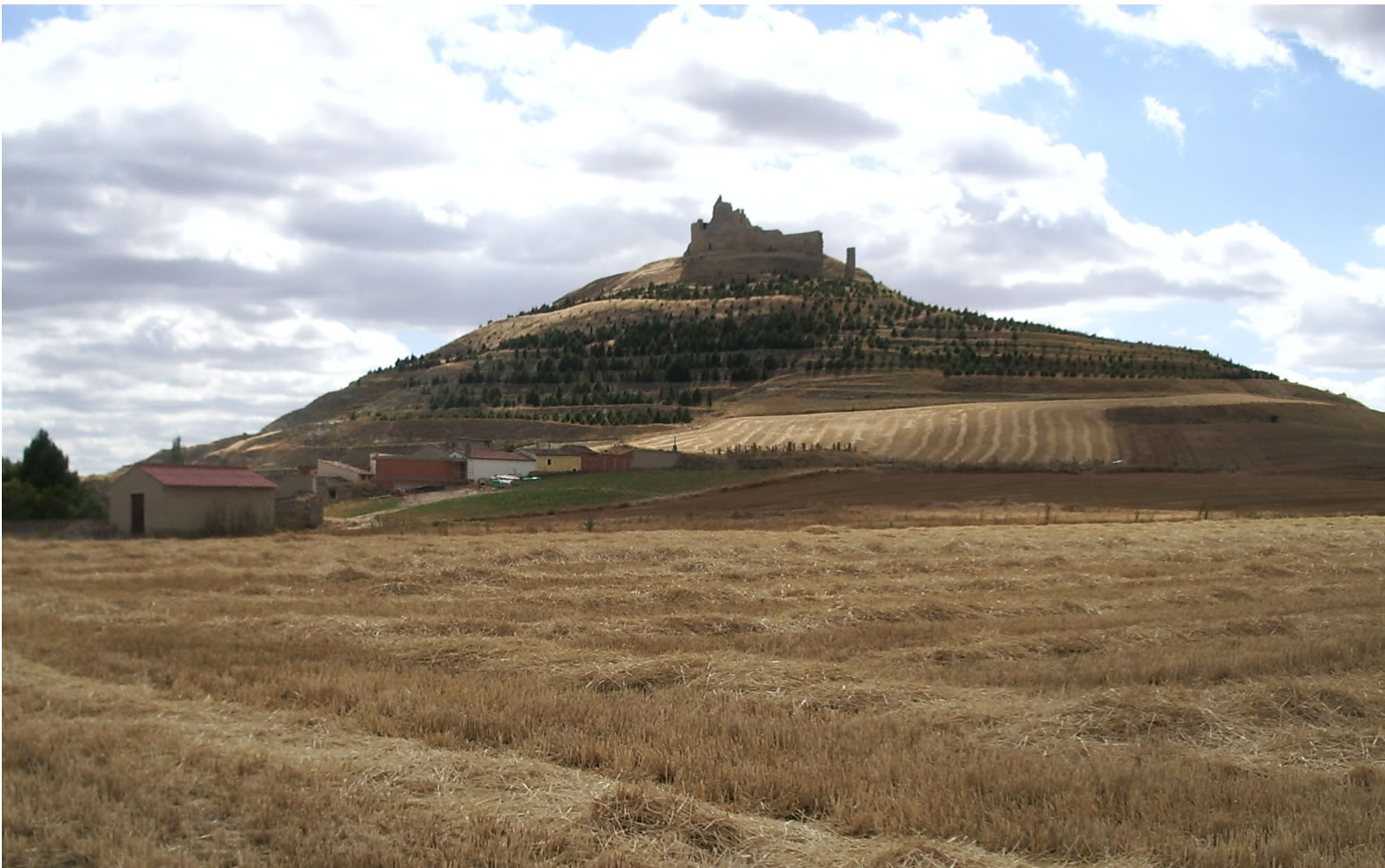
Castillo de Castrogeriz

Munio Núñez, Count of Castile (899–c. 901 and c. 904–c. 909), was a nobleman who was almost certainly the son of Nuño Muñoz, who would have been the son of Munio Núñez de Brañosera who in 824, with his wife Argilo, granted the Carta Puebla de Brañosera, the Fuero similar to the medieval English custumal that stipulated the economic, political, and social customs and regulations for governing a town, in this case, Brañosera that had just been repopulated.

Munio's presence is first recorded in 882 in relation to the repopulation and defense of the fortress in Castrogeriz from his base in Amaya. In that same year, Count Diego Rodríguez Porcelos was defending the Pancorbo mountain pass in the Obarenes mountain range against the armies of the Emir of Córdoba. Munio had to flee in 882 when the Muslim troops led by Al-Mundhir attacked, but by 883, with work on the fortress at a more advanced stage, he was able to resist behind the new walls.

When Diego Rodríguez Porcelos died in 885, his children were probably very young and were not able to succeed him. It was not until 1 March 899 that Munio Núñez first appears with the title of Count of Castile while, at the same time, Count Gonzalo Fernández was governing Burgos.

Munio appears again as Count of Castile in February and on 23 July of 909. In 912, Munio Núñez was one of the three counts that King García entrusted with the repopulation of the land along the banks of the Duero River: Munio repopulated Roa; Gonzalo Fernández brought settlers to Burgos, Clunia and San Esteban de Gormaz; and Gonzalo Téllez settled Osma.

Some authors suggest that he was the father of Muniadona, the wife of King Garcia I of León. (Note: Claudio Sánchez Albornoz in his work Orígenes de la Nación Española believed that Muniadona could be the daughter of Munio Núñez (he calls him Nuño).) Historian Manuel Carriedo Tejedo hypothesizes that King García's wife could be the daughter of Nuño Ordóñez, brother of King Alfonso III of Asturias, and that Muniadona could also be the mother of Count Fernán González of Castile. Justo Pérez de Urbel also suspected that Fernán González was related, through his mother, to King Alfonso III.

== Bibliography ==
- Carriedo Tejedo, Manuel (1980). "Sobre un posible parentesco de la madre de Fernán González con la familia real leonesa". Tierras de León: Revista de la Diputación Provincial (in Spanish). 20 (41): 43–50. ISSN 0495-5773.
- Martínez Díez, Gonzalo (2005). El Condado de Castilla (711-1038): la historia frente a la leyenda (in Spanish). Vol. I. Valladolid. ISBN 84-95379-95-3.
- Pérez de Urbel, Justo (1945). Historia del Condado de Castilla (in Spanish). Vol. I. Madrid: Consejo Superior de Investigaciones Científicas. OCLC 807132337.
