= Fernando Díaz (count in Lantarón and Cerezo) =

Fernando Díaz (fl. 917–924) was the count and tenente of Lantarón and Cerezo on the eastern frontier of the Kingdom of León in 923–24. He was a son of Diego Rodríguez, count of Castile.

There is a document dated 28 March 913 which records that King Vermudo was reigning in León and Fernando Díaz in Lantarón. Unfortunately, the date on the document is impossible, since Vermudo II was not king at that time and the count of Lantarón, known from other documents, was Gonzalo Téllez. The historian Gonzalo Martínez Díez has suggested the date should be corrected to 923 and the king to Ordoño II.

In 917, after the death of Count Gonzalo Fernández of Castile, a count named Fernando appears governing Castile. This may have been Fernando Díaz, who was active around the same time in the neighbouring region of Álava, or possibly Fernando Ansúrez I, who was certainly count of Castile at a later date. In January 918, Fernando Díaz was in the city of León, where he signed a document in the cathedral as Fredinandus Didazi comes ("Fernando, son of Diego, count"), without specifying his county.

Fernando had at least two brothers: Gómez Díaz, alférez of Count Fernán González of Castile, and Gonzalo Díaz.

== Sources ==
- Martín Viso, Iñaki (2002). "Poder político y estructura social en la Castilla altomedieval: el condado de Lantarón (Siglos VIII-XI)" (PDF). Los espacios de poder en la España medieval: XII Semana de Estudios Medievales, Nájera, del 30 de julio al 3 de agosto de 2001 (in Spanish). Logroño: Gobierno de La Rioja, Instituto de Estudios Riojanos. pp. 533–552. ISBN 84-95747-24-3.
- Martínez Díez, Gonzalo (2005). El Condado de Castilla (711–1038): La historia frente a la leyenda. Valladolid: Junta de Castilla y León. ISBN 84-9718-275-8.
- Pérez de Urbel, Justo (1945). Historia del Condado de Castilla. Madrid: Consejo Superior de Investigaciones Científicas. OCLC 5661964.
