= County of Álava =

County of Álava Arabako konderria Condado de Álava
- c. 860–1200
- Status: Vassal of the Kingdom of Asturias; Vassal of the Kingdom of León; Vassal of the Kingdom of Navarre
- Capital: Victoriacum
- Government: County
- Historical era: Middle Ages
  - Established: c. 860
  - Annexation to the Kingdom of Castile: 1200
Preceded by	Succeeded by
Kingdom of Asturias; Duchy of Gascony	Kingdom of Castile

The County of Álava (Basque: Arabako konderria) was one of the Basque señoríos, a feudal territory during the 9th and 13th centuries that corresponds to present-day Álava, in the Basque Country. Until the final invasion and incorporation into the Kingdom of Castile in the year 1200, the county was governed by counts vassals of the Kingdoms of Asturias, León and Navarre, being under the sphere of influence of one or the other at different times. The figure governing Alava received the title of Count of Álava.

== Counts of Álava ==
The Counts of Álava were the governing figures of the County of Álava and were, at different times, under the sphere of influence of the kingdoms of Asturias, Navarre and, ultimately, Castile.

=== Vassals of the Asturian monarchs ===
Name	Portrait	Birth	Marriage(s)	Death
Eylo c. 868				
Rodrigo of Castile; Also first Count of Castile c.860-c.870		Unknown	Egilona	873
Vela Jiménez; Also known as Vigila Scemeniz c.882-c.897		Unknown	Velasquita Sánchez two children	Unknown
Gonzalo Téllez; Known as Count of Lantaron and Cerezo c.897-c.919		Unknown	Flámula	915
Munio Vélaz; Known as Monnio Uigilazi in Alaba c.919		Unknown; Son of Vela Jiménez and Velasquita Sánchez	Velasquita four children	919
Fernando Díaz; 923		Unknown; Son of Diego Rodríguez Porcelos	Unknown	Unknown
Álvaro Herraméliz; Known as Count of Lantaron and Álava c929-931		Unknown	Sancha Sánchez of Pamplona two children	Unknown
Fernán González of Castile; Also Count of Castile; 932-970		c.910 Son of Gonzalo Fernández of Castile and Muniadona of Lara	Sancha Sánchez of Pamplona, widow of Álvaro Herrameliz seven children	970
García Fernández of Castile; Of the white hands Also Count of Castile; 970-995		938; Son of Fernán González of Castile and Sancha Sánchez of Pamplona	Ava of Ribagorza seven children	995
Sancho García of Castile; Also Count of Castile; 995		c.965 Son of García Fernández of Castile and Ava of Ribagorza	Urraca Gómez five children	1017

=== Vassals of the Navarrese monarchs ===
Name	Portrait	Birth	Marriage(s)	Death
Munio González c.1030		Unknown	Unknown	Unknown
Fortún Íñiguez c.1043		Unknown	Unknown	Unknown
Munio Muñoz c.1045		Unknown	Unknown	Unknown
Alvaro Díaz known as Don Marcelo c.1056		Unknown	Goto López	before July 1072

=== Vassals of the Castilian monarchs ===
Name	Portrait	Birth	Marriage(s)	Death
Lope Íñiguez; Also Lord of Biscay c.1076		c.1050 Son of Íñigo López and Toda Fortunez	Ticlo Díaz five children	1093
Lope González c.1093		Unknown	Unknown	Unknown
Lope Sánchez c.1099		Unknown	Unknown	Unknown
Diego López the White; Also Lord of Biscay; 1093–1124		1075; Son of Lope Íñiguez and Ticlo Díaz	María Sánchez three children	1124
Ladrón Íñiguez c.1130		Unknown	Unknown	Unknown
Lope Díaz the one from Nájera; Also Lord of Biscay; 1125–1170		Unknown; Son of Diego López and María Sánchez	Aldonza eleven children	6 May 1170
Vela Ladrón; Vela from Navarre; Also Lord of Biscay c.1155		1115; Son of Ladrón Íñiguez	Unknown	1173
Juan Vélaz c.1174		Unknown; Son of Vela Ladrón	Unknown	Unknown

From the year 1200, the County of Álava was fully incorporated into the Kingdom of Castile and the title of Count of Álava ceased to be used.

== See also ==
- Álava
- Kingdom of Navarre
