= Eylo =

First attested count of Álava

Eylo or Gilo (fl. c. 868) is the first attested count of Álava. He is known from the chronicle of Sampiro, written in the first third of the eleventh century, which presents him as a rebellious subject of the Kingdom of Asturias, strongly suggesting that he was not appointed count by the king but was instead the leader of a rebellion. After King Alfonso III marched an army into Álava, the people submitted and Eylo was taken into captivity and brought back to Alfonso's capital of Oviedo.

Sampiro presents the story of Eylo immediately after his account of the usurpation of Fruela, which took place in 866–67 and which forced Alfonso III to take refuge in Álava. In these years, there were also major attacks on Álava from the Emirate of Córdoba to the south. The Emir Muhammad I launched a major raid ending in a pitched battle in 866 and his son al-Hakam invaded the region again the next year. It is unlikely, therefore, that Eylo's rebellion took place before 868. The Chronicle of Albelda, written around 881 in neighbouring Navarre, refers to "much time having passed" in 873 since the rebellion, although it does not mention Eylo by name.

Sampiro's chronicle is preserved in two twelfth-century copies: that made by Pelagius of Oviedo for his Chronicon regum Legionensium and that made for the Historia silense. They differ in the spelling of the count's name. The copy of Pelagius uses Eylo (accusative Eylonem) and the Silense uses Gilo (Gilonem). It is possible that the obscure Eylo is the same person as the next known count of Álava, Vela Jiménez, active in 882–83. The name Vela (or Beila) appears in Latin documents in various declensions as Vigila, Vigilonis and Vigilonem. If the spelling Gilonem is the more authentic for the earlier count (and Eylonem a corruption), it may represent a shortened form of Vigilonem (Vela). If they are the same person, then Alfonso III must at some point have released his prisoner and put him back in power.

== Primary source ==
This is Pelagius' version of Sampiro's account:

A messenger from Álava arrived, announcing that their hearts had been inflamed against the king; hearing this the monarch disposed to march towards [Álava]. Impelled by the fear that his arrival produced, they quickly recognised their obligations and lowered their heads in supplication before him and promised him that they would remain faithful to his kingship and his authority, and that they would do whatever he ordered them. In this way he subjugated to his own power an Álava [that was] stretched out before him. Eylo, who was presented as their count, he took to Oviedo in irons.
Ipso vero istis satagente operibus, nuntius ex Alavis venit, eo quod intumuerant corda illorum contra regem. Rex vero haec audiens, illuc ire disposuit; terrore adventus ejus compulsi sunt, et subito jura debita cognoscentes, supplices colla ei submiserunt, pollicentes se regno et ditioni ejus fideles existere, et quod imperaretur efficere; sicque Alavam obtentam proprio imperio subjugavit. Eylonem vero, qui comes illorum videbatur, ferro vinctum secum Ovetum attraxit.

== Bibliography ==
- Barrau-Dihigo, Lucien (1989). Historia política del reino asturiano (718–910). Gijón: Silverio Cañada. ISBN 84-7286-273-9.
- Collins, Roger (2012). Caliphs and Kings: Spain, 796–1031. London: Wiley Blackwell. ISBN 978-1-118-73001-0.
- Martínez Díez, Gonzalo (1974). Álava medieval. Vol. 1. Vitoria: Diputación Foral de Álava.
- Martínez Díez, Gonzalo (2005). El Condado de Castilla (711–1038): La historia frente a la leyenda. Valladolid: Junta de Castilla y León. ISBN 84-9718-275-8.
