= Diego Rodríguez Porcelos =

- 2nd Count of Castile
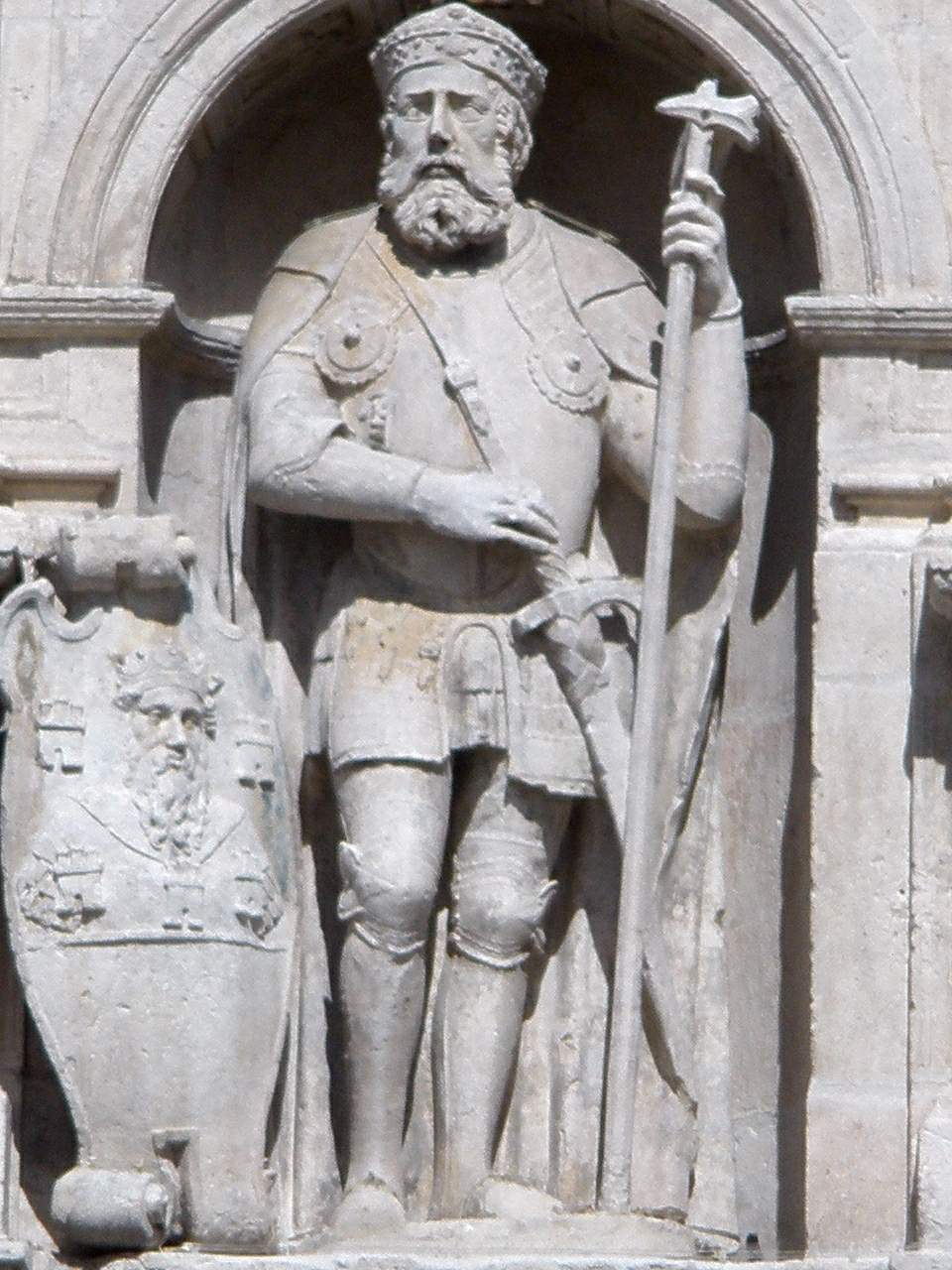
- Statue of Count Diego Rodríguez Porcelos in Arco de Santa María, Burgos
- Predecessor: Rodrigo of Castile
- Died: 885? Cornudilla
- Buried: San Felices hermitage, Villafranca Montes de Oca
- Father: Rodrigo of Castile

Diego Rodríguez Porcelos (governed 873 – c. 885), was the second Count of Castile, succeeding his father Rodrigo. He did not govern Álava, however, as his father had done, since this responsibility fell on Count Vela Jiménez. Between 882 and 884 and under the mandate of King Alfonso III of Asturias, he was in charge of the repoblación of Burgos and Ubierna.

Shortly before 882, he built a castle in Pancorbo from where he confronted a large Arab army trying to annex the valley of the Ebro in two different military campaigns in 882 and 883. He also created a defensive line along the river Arlanzón, and in 884 founded an outpost that would develop into the city of Burgos. It also appears he restored the episcopal see of Oca (ancient Auca).

His date and place of death are not agreed upon by the chronicles, though 885 is most probable as recorded in the Chronica Naierensis which states that Didacus comes...et interfectus est in Cornuta era DCCCCXXIII, secundo kalendas febroarii, that is, that he was killed in Cornudilla on 31 January, and most likely, in a battle against the Muslim troops faithful to the Banu Qasi. Nevertheless, other historians, such as Justo Pérez de Urbel give 890 as his decease date. His body, however, was supposedly buried in the hermitage of San Felices de Oca (nowadays Villafranca Montes de Oca). After his death, Castile was divided by his successors into many counties until 932.

== Descendants ==
The name of the mother of his children, who were probably very young when he died, is not known. These were:

- Gómez Díaz, who should not be confused with his namesake, Gómez Díaz count in Saldaña, appears in 932 as the alférez of Count Fernán González whose eldest son, Gonzalo Fernández, married Fronilde Gómez, possibly a daughter of this Gómez Díaz.
- Gonzalo Díaz, who appears on 3 February 921 with his wife María at the Monastery of San Pedro de Cardeña donating some watermills at the Arlanzón River and declaring that he was the son of Count Diego (Gundessalbus, Didaci comite filius).
- Fernando Díaz, count in Lantarón and Cerezo.

== Monuments in his memory ==
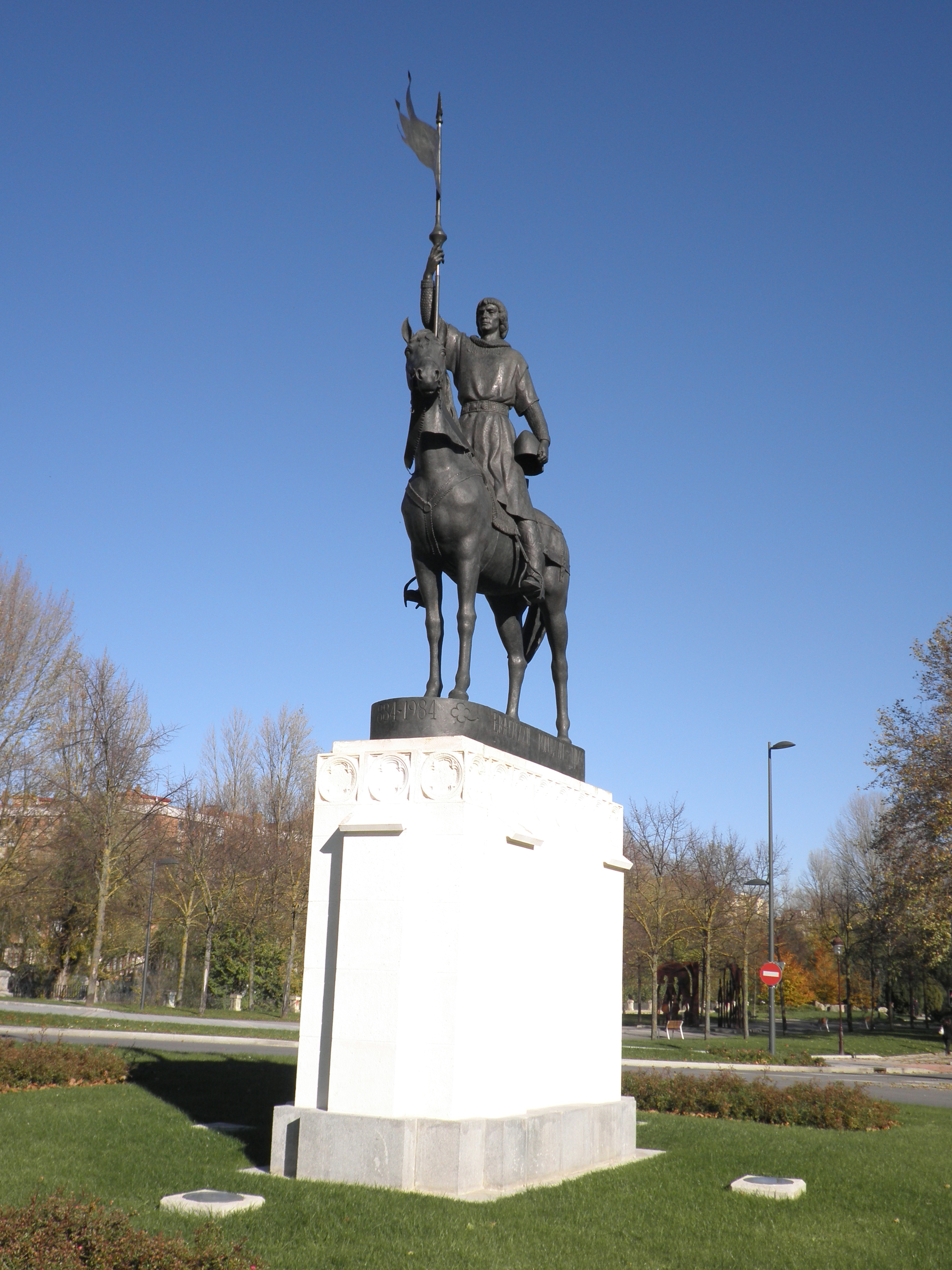
Equestrian statue of Diego Rodríguez

In a roundabout near the Museum of Human Evolution in Burgos, there is an equestrian statue in his honour, made in 1983 by sculptor Juan de Ávalos. He is also depicted in a sixteenth century statue in the Arco de Santa María, in the same city.

== Bibliography ==
- Martínez Díez, Gonzalo (2005). El Condado de Castilla (711-1038). La historia frente a la leyenda (in Spanish). Valladolid: Junta de Castilla y León. ISBN 84-9718-275-8.
- Pérez de Urbel, Justo (1945). Historia del Condado de Castilla. Madrid: Consejo Superior de Investigaciones Científicas. OCLC 5661964.
- Torres Sevilla-Quiñones de León, Margarita Cecilia (1999). Linajes nobiliarios de León y Castilla. Siglos IX-XIII (in Spanish). Salamanca: Junta de Castilla y León, Consejería de educación y cultura. ISBN 84-7846-781-5.

Diego Rodríguez Porcelos Died: 885
Preceded by Rodrigo	Count of Castile; 873–885	Succeeded by Munio Núñez
