= Battle of the Morcuera =

865 battle as part of the Spanish Reconquista

Coordinates: 42.6833°N 2.9333°W

- Part of the Reconquista
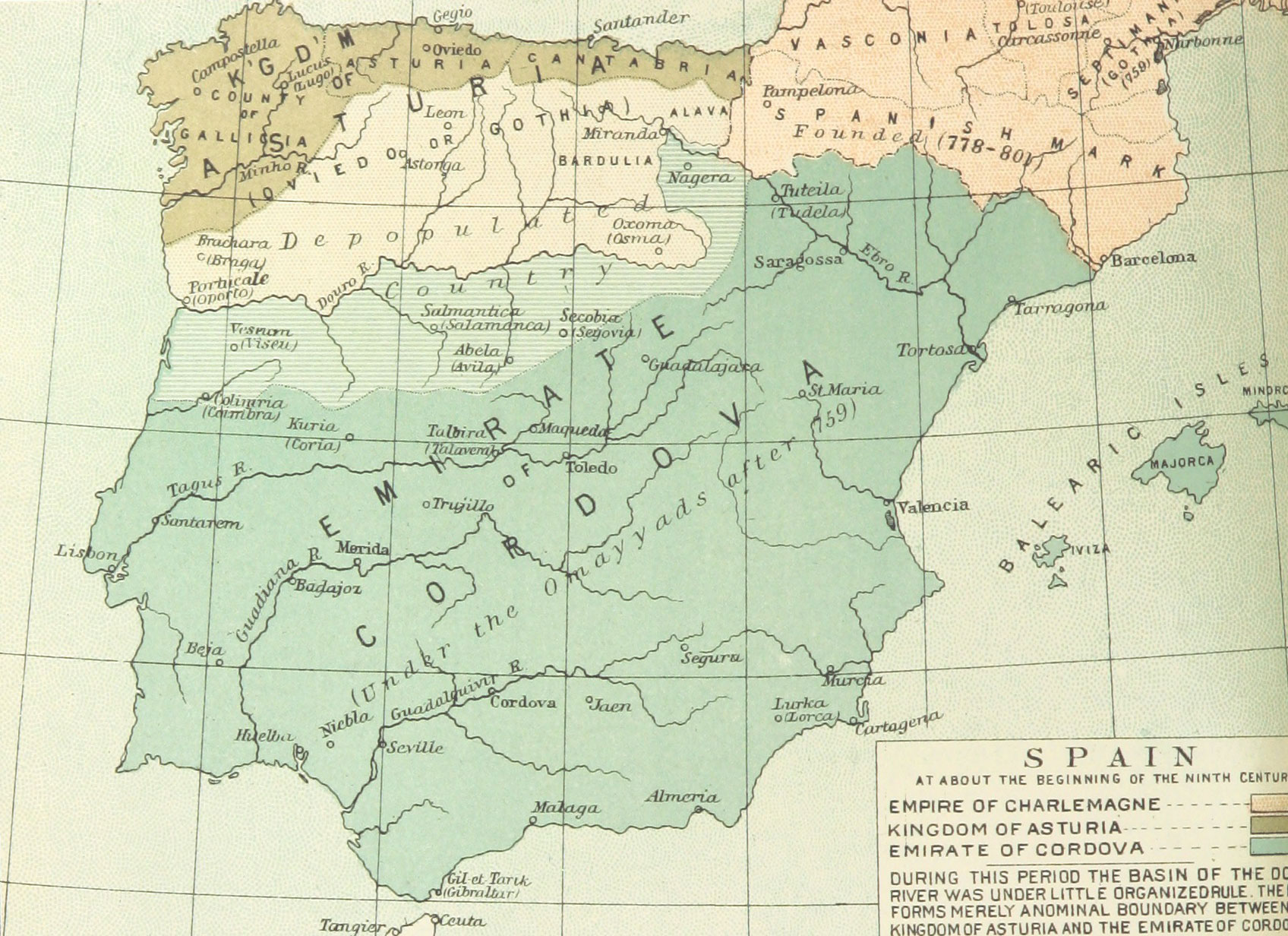
- Iberian Peninsula early 9th Century
Date	9 August 865
Location	Hoz de la Morcuera, between Burgos and La Rioja, Spain
Result	Umayyad victory

Belligerents
Kingdom of Asturias; County of Castile; Toledo rebels	Emirate of Córdoba

Commanders and leaders
Ordoño I of Asturias; Rodrigo of Castile	Muhammad I of Córdoba

The Battle of the Morcuera, was a battle of the Spanish Reconquista that took place in the Hoz de la Morcuera between the municipalities of Foncea and Bugedo nearby the city of Miranda de Ebro on 9 August, 865. The battle was fought between the combined Christian troops of the Kingdom of Castile and the Kingdom of Asturias under Rodrigo of Castile and the UmayyadMuslim forces of the Emirate of Cordoba under Muhammad I of Córdoba. The battle resulted in a victory for the Cordobans and a general retreat in the overall Reconquista process.

== Battle ==
In the year 865, Muhammad I of Córdoba attacked the Kingdom of Asturias during the reign of Ordoño I. Christian forces under the command of Rodrigo of Castile, the count of Castile, were attacked in the gorge of Hoz de la Morcuera. The Muslim forces surprised the Christian forces throughout the Miranda de Ebro valley and the fighting carried all the way to Añana. After retreating from the general area, Rodrigo of Castile attempted to cut off the Muslim escape route at Pancorbo, but failed when the Muslims gained knowledge of his intentions. They escaped by way of the basin of the Oja River.

This defeat caused a general halt to the re-population efforts undertaken by the Christians in the area of Meseta Central, a job that Ordoño I's son, Alfonso III of Asturias would continue throughout his own reign. Alfonso III would also there deal with sectors of the Asturian nobility who had desires for independence.

Muhammad I of Córdoba took advantage of the disabilities encountered by the Christians when they further lost the fortresses of Cerezo Río Tirón, Ibrillos and Grañón to send new waves of attack in 866 and 867.

== See also ==
- Reconquista
  - Asturias in the Reconquista
- Muhammad I of Córdoba
- Emirate of Córdoba
- Kingdom of Asturias
