= Fruela (usurper) =

Fruela (or Froila) was briefly the king of Asturias in 866 after usurping the throne from Alfonso III.

== Events ==
Prior to seizing the throne, Fruela was a count in or of Galicia. There he presided over a legal hearing in Lugo on 5 June 861. The hearing took place "in the presence of the lord count Fruela [and he] adjudicated it". He later got into a legal dispute over the villa of Carcacía with the diocese of Iria Flavia. After assuming power, he confiscated the land in question.

When Ordoño I died on 27 May 866, his son Alfonso, either fourteen or eighteen years old, succeeded him. A charter issued by Alfonso on 18 June 866 attests to his succession. Sometime after that date, Fruela seized the throne and forced Alfonso into exile in Castile or Álava. Within a few months, the usurper had been assassinated in Oviedo. Alfonso's restoration had taken place by 20 January 867, when he restored to Iria Flavia the land that Fruela had confiscated. This charter was confirmed by Count Rodrigo of Castile, who had evidently returned with Alfonso to Oviedo. He may have had a role in defeating Fruela.

== Sources ==
The usurpation of Fruela is not recorded in the Chronicle of Alfonso III, a historical compilation ordered by Alfonso III towards the end of his reign, although Alfonso's charter of January 867 makes oblique reference to it: "the villa of Carcacía, which [belonged] by reason to the church in Iria and that of Saint Eulalia, that the unfortunate Fruela seized for himself." It is mentioned in the work of Sampiro, writing in the early 11th century, and from Sampiro it was incorporated into the 12th-century Historia Silense. The fullest and earliest account, however, is found in the Chronicle of Albelda. This was written around 881:

Alfonso, the son of Ordoño, assumed the kingship in his eighteenth year. In the first flower of his adolescence—in the first year of his kingship and the eighteenth since his birth—he was deprived of his rule as the result of a rebellion by the apostate count of Galicia, Fruela. The king left for Castile. After a short time, this same rebel and unfortunate king, Fruela, was killed by those faithful to our prince in Oviedo, and the glorious young man was brought back from Castile.

Sampiro (and the Historia Silense) gives Fruela the patronymic surname "Jemúndez", implying that he had a father named Jemundo. "Jemúndez" may, however, be an error for Vermúdez, meaning son of Vermudo. The given name Fruela was used by the ruling dynasty of Asturias, suggesting that Fruela may have been a distant royal relative. Sampiro also refers to Fruela as a "son of perdition", a reference to Judas Iscariot:

Alfonso, son of the lord Ordoño, succeeded in the kingdom. He was warlike, and in all skills well trained. Upon his entry into the kingship, being fourteen years of age, a son of perdition, a certain Fruela Jemúndez, from the Galician regions came to claim the kingdom, which did not belong to him. But the king Alfonso, upon hearing this, retreated to the region of Álava. But the nefarious Fruela himself was killed by the noblemen [or senate] of Oviedo. Hearing this, the king returned to his own and was joyously received.

The Chronicon Lusitanum repeats the Chronicle of Albelda almost word for word, but agrees with Sampiro about Alfonso's age in 866:

In the first year of his reign and fourteenth since his birth, the apostate Fruela, count of Galicia, deprived him of the kingdom by usurpation.
