= Fernán González of Castile =

Count of Castile and Burgos (c. 910–970)

Fernán González
- Born: c. 910; Lara de los Infantes
- Died: 970; Burgos
- Noble family: Beni Mamaduna
- Spouses: Sancha Sánchez of Pamplona; Urraca Garcés of Pamplona
- Issue: García; Urraca
- Father: Gonzalo Fernández of Castile
- Mother: Muniadona

Fernán González (died 970) was the first autonomous count of Castile. Fernán González was a colourful character of legendary status in Iberia, and founder of the dynasty that would rule a semi-autonomous Castile, laying the foundations for its status as an independent kingdom. In the year 930, Fernán's name appears with the title of count inside the administrative organization of the eastern Kingdom of León.

== Early life and family ==
Fernán was the son of Gonzalo Fernández, who had been named count of Arlanza and the Duero around the year 900, and by tradition a descendant of semi-legendary judge Nuño Rasura. His mother Muniadona was so well remembered that the later counts of Castile would sometimes be recorded by Iberian Muslim scholars as Ibn Māma Duna (descendant of Muniadona).

Fernán González grew up in the castle of Lara, where his father had begun the process of reuniting the fractured counties of Old Castile. What had been a single county under Rodrigo of Castile had been split after the death of the latter's son Diego Rodríguez Porcelos in 885. About 899, Gonzalo was named count of Burgos, and around 909 succeeded his kinsman Munio Núñez as count of Castile, representing a fraction of the previous county of that name. Following Gonzalo's 915 death, the counties would be held by Fernando Ansúrez, Gonzalo's brother Nuño Fernández, Fernando Ansúrez again, and Gutier Núñez. Fernán González was made count of Castile and Burgos before 931. The same year, Álvaro Herraméliz, count of Álava, Cerezo and Lantarón died, and Fernán succeeded him as well, thereby reuniting Rodrigo's county. He also married Álvaro's widow, Sancha Sánchez, the sister of King García Sánchez I of Pamplona. One of the daughters of Sancho I of Pamplona and Toda of Navarre, she had been twice widowed, having first married king Ordoño II of León late in his life as his third wife — two of her sisters, Onneca and Urraca, would marry Sancha's step-sons, Ordoño's sons Alfonso IV of León and Ramiro II of León. Following Ordoño's death in 924, she had married count Álvaro Herraméliz. Her marriage to Fernán not only allowed him to unite Castile, but reinforced political alliances across the Christian north.

== Career ==
Fernán gathered under his control a strong military force composed of troops from the counties of Burgos, Asturias, Santillana, Lantaron, Álava, Castile, and Lara. His military prowess came to prominence in the Battle of Simancas in 939 and then at Sepulveda, where he wrested the region from the Moors and repopulated it. As his power increased, so did his independence from León.

After having fought with Ramiro II of León against the Arabs, and after the Battle of Simancas and the retreat of the Muslims, Fernán was dissatisfied because the king of León distributed his troops in the frontier towns and he rose in rebellion against him. In 944, the county of Castile was stripped from him and awarded by the king to his son Sancho, with count Ansur Fernández serving as regent. Fernán was defeated and made prisoner for 3 years until he became reconciled with his sovereign, giving his daughter Urraca in marriage to the king's heir, Ordoño, who afterwards became King Ordoño III.

Upon the death of Ramiro II of León in 951, the kingdom of León experienced a dynastic crisis that Fernán played out to his advantage. Initially Fernán supported the demands of Sancho against his elder half-brother Ordoño III, Fernán's own son-in-law. When Sancho failed, Fernán was forced to recognize Ordoño as king, even though the latter cast off Fernán's daughter. Ordoño's early death allowed Fernán to recover his maneuvering capacity, although he abandoned his old ally, now king Sancho I, instead supporting his rival Ordoño IV, son of Alfonso IV and the new husband of Fernán's daughter Urraca. Shortly after 4 September 959, his wife Sancha of Navarre died, and in 960 Fernán was defeated through Navarrese intervention on Sancho's behalf. He was captured by García Sánchez I of Pamplona, but he recovered his freedom after making various territorial concessions and by forswearing his support for Ordoño IV. Prior to 5 May 964 he cemented the new alliance by remarrying García's own daughter Urraca, the niece of his first wife, while Fernán's daughter of the same name, this time divorced by Ordoño IV, was married to García's heir, the future Sancho II of Pamplona. With the kingdom of León weakened and in disorder, Fernán slowly solidified a position of autonomy as count of Castile, with only nominal fealty due to León.

== Death ==
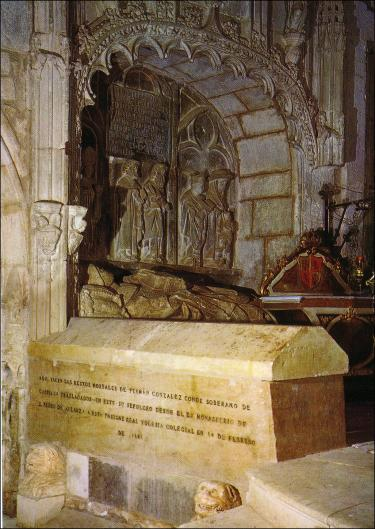
Sepulchre of Fernán González at Covarrubias, Spain. The lid is from the nineteenth century and the casket from the fifth.

After Fernán's death the county was left to his son García Fernández, while his widow Urraca returned to the Pamplona court before marrying William II Sánchez of Gascony. His remains were buried in the monastery of San Pedro of Arlanza. His life and feats are recorded in an anonymous poem, The Poem of Fernán González, written between 1250 and 1271 and preserved as an incomplete copy from the fifteenth century.

== Issue ==
By his first wife, Sancha Sánchez of Pamplona, he had the following children:

- Gonzalo, who married Fronilde Gómez, suggested to have been granddaughter of count Diego Rodríguez Porcelos
- Sancho, named in a charter of his paternal grandmother
- Munio
- García, his eventual successor
- Urraca, twice queen of León as wife of Ordoño III and Ordoño IV, and then of Pamplona, having married Sancho II
- Muniadona, wife of Gómez Díaz, count of Saldaña, of the powerful Beni Gómez clan

Fernán González of Castile Beni Mamaduna Born: c. 910 Died: 970
Preceded by Gutier Núñez	Count of Castile and Burgos; 923–970	Succeeded by García Fernández
Preceded by Álvaro Herraméliz	Count of Álava; 931–970	Succeeded by García Fernández
Preceded by Álvaro Herraméliz	Count of Cerezo & Lantarón; 931–970	Succeeded by García Fernández
