= Albelda =

Coordinates: 41°52′N 0°28′E

- municipality
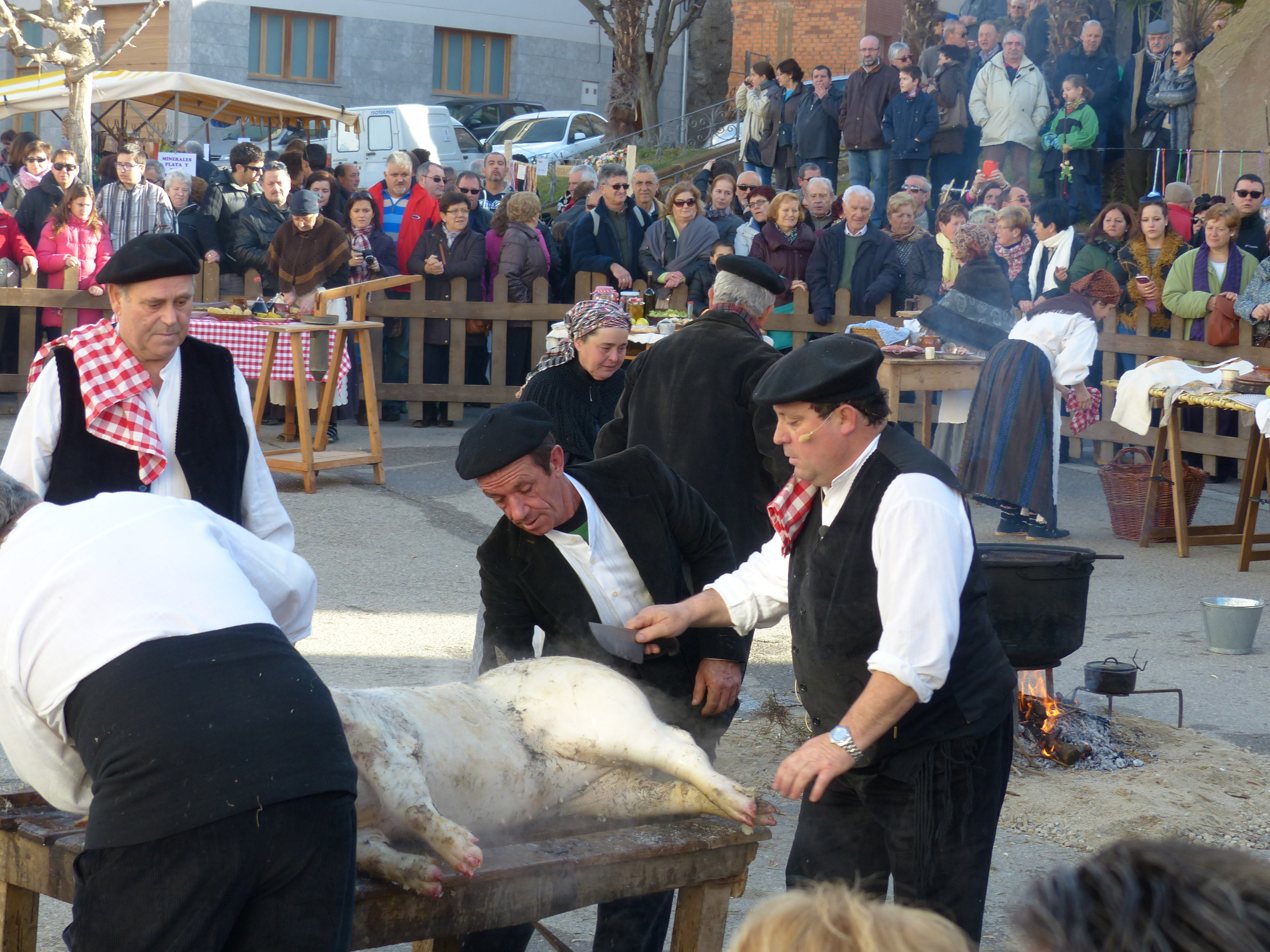

- Flag Coat of arms
- Interactive map of Albelda
- Country: Spain
- Autonomous community: Aragon
- Province: Huesca

Area
  - Total: 51.9 km^{2} (20.0 sq mi)

Population (2025-01-01)
  - Total: 728
  - Density: 14.0/km^{2} (36.3/sq mi)
- Time zone: UTC+1 (CET)
  - Summer (DST): UTC+2 (CEST)

Albelda (Spanish: [alˈβelda]; Catalan: [alˈβɛlda]) is a municipality located in the province of Huesca, Aragon, Spain. According to the 2004 census (INE), the municipality had a population of 877 inhabitants.

== See also ==
- List of municipalities in Huesca
