= Álvaro Herraméliz =

Álvaro Herraméliz (fl. 923–931), was a Spanish noble and the count of Lantarón and of Álava in the region that today would be considered the Basque Country in northern Spain.

== Biography ==
Count Álvaro was the son of Herramel, a noble who was active in the Reconquista and in the repopulation of lands in Álava, Burgos, and La Rioja where two towns bear his name, Herramel and Herramélluri. In 923, Álvaro participated in the conquest of Nájera and Viguera alongside king Ordoño II of León and on 20 October of that same year, he confirmed the foundational charter of the monastery at Santa Coloma, La Rioja. Even though it was not until 28 September 929 that he is recorded in charters for the first time as Count of Álava, he could have held the title at an earlier date. After the defeat of the armies of the kingdoms of León and Navarre on 26 July 920 at the Battle of Valdejunquera, King Ordoño could have replaced Munio Vélaz — who confirms as Count of Álava for the last time on 18 May 919 — and named Álvaro in his stead. He was also count in Lantarón as evidenced by the dating of a charter on 28 August 929, "...reigning King Alfonso in León and count Álvaro Herraméliz in Lantarón".

On 11 January 931, he witnessed his last charter as "Count Álvaro Herraméliz in Álava" (comes Alvaro Arramelliz in Alava). In the summer of that year, King Alfonso IV abdicated after the death of his wife Oneca, who was also Alvaro's sister-in-law. He was succeeded by his brother Ramiro II. King Alfonso, who had become a monk in the Monastery of Sahagún, repented afterwards and in the winter of that year made his first attempt to regain the throne, making his second attempt in the summer of 932. It is not known if Álvaro, who for family reasons had probably supported Alfonso IV, was killed during the war between the two brothers, Alfonso IV and Ramiro II, of if he was replaced by the latter who entrusted the governance of the county to Fernán González of Castile. He died no later than 932 since his widow and her new husband appear on 5 August 935 together for the first time and two children, Gonzalo and Sancho, had been born by then.

== Marriage and descendants ==
He married Sancha Sánchez of Pamplona, daughter of King Sancho Garcés I and queen Toda, and the widow of Ordoño II. Sancha was the sister of Oneca, the wife of King Alfonso IV of León, and of Velasquita, married to Count Munio Vélaz of Álava. After Álvaro's death, she would later marry Fernán González of Castile. At least two sons, both documented, who lived and developed their activities in the Kingdom of León, were born of this marriage:

- Herramel Álvarez, documented from 956 to 995, who went on to found the town of Villarramiel. He was probably the father of another Álvaro Herraméliz who appears often in contemporary sources and succeeded count Gonzalo Menéndez as the alférez of Vermudo II of León in 996.
- Fortún Álvarez, who appears in several charters in the monastery of Sahagún confirming documents with his brother and other Basque-Navarrese magnates in the court of Ramiro II of León.

Another possible son is Vela Álvarez who appears in 947 accompanying Fernán González, and who, according to Ramón Menéndez Pidal, could have been the unidentified Count Vela who was dispossessed of his dominions by the Castilian count.

Preceded by Fernando Díaz	Count of Lantarón and Cerezo; 929–931	Succeeded by Fernán González of Castile
Preceded by Munio Vélaz	Count of Álava; 929–931	Succeeded by Fernán González of Castile

== Sources ==
- Balparda y las Herrerías, Gregorio de (1933–34). Historia crítica de Vizcaya y de sus Fueros. Vol. II, Libro III. El primer fuero de Vizcaya, el de los Señores. Bilbao: Imprenta Mayli. OCLC 634212337.
- Fernández, Luis (1975). "Una familia noble vasconavarra que emigró a León en el siglo X: Los Herraméliz, 993–1017". León y su historia. Miscelánea histórica (in Spanish). León: Centro de Estudios e Investigación "San Isidoro". Archivo histórico diocesano. Caja de Ahorros y Monte de Piedad de León. pp. 293–357. ISBN 84-00-04231-X.
- Fernández Martín, Luis; Fernández Martín, Pedro (1964). Villarramiel de Campos. Nuevos datos para su historia (in Spanish). Madrid: Escuela Gráfica Salesiana. OCLC 743652610.
- Martínez Díez, Gonzalo (2005). El Condado de Castilla (711-1038): la historia frente a la leyenda (in Spanish). Vol. I. Valladolid: Marcial Pons. Historia. ISBN 84-9718-276-6.
- Pérez de Urbel, Justo (1945). Historia del Condado de Castilla. Madrid: Consejo Superior de Investigaciones Científicas. OCLC 5661964.
- Salazar y Acha, Jaime de (1985). Una Familia de la Alta Edad Media: Los Velas y su Realidad Histórica (en Estudios Genealógicos y Heráldicos). Asociación Española de Estudios Genealógicos y Heráldicos. ISBN 84-398-3591-4.
- Torres Sevilla-Quiñones de León, Margarita (1999). Linajes nobiliarios de León y Castilla (in Spanish). Salamanca: Junta de Castilla y León. ISBN 84-7846-781-5.
