= Pancorbo =

Coordinates: 42.63022°N 3.11240°W

- Municipality and town
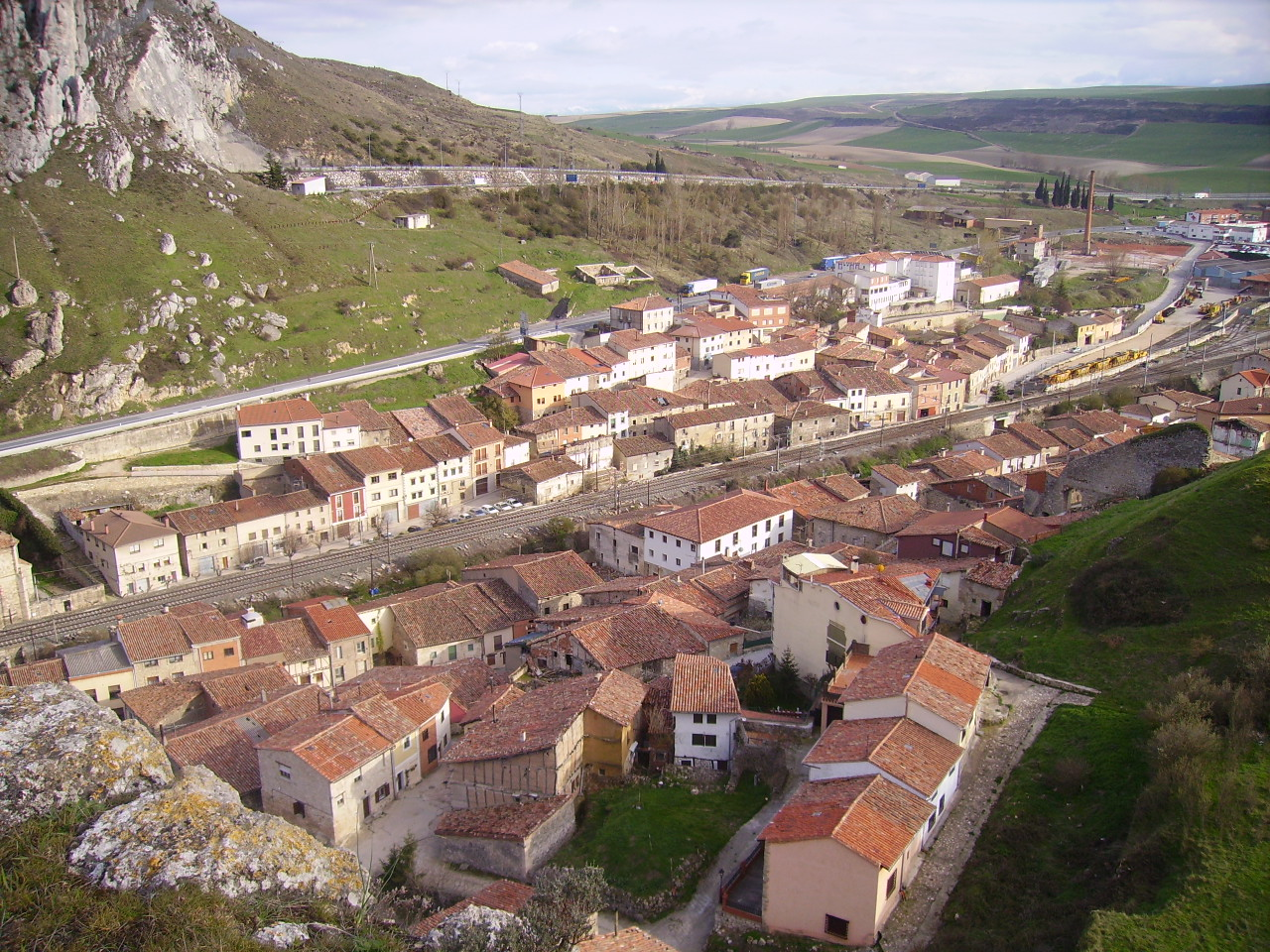
- View of Pancorbo, 2011

- Flag Coat of arms
- Interactive map of Pancorbo
- Country: Spain
- Autonomous community: Castile and León
- Province: Burgos
- Comarca: Comarca del Ebro

Area
  - Total: 58 km^{2} (22 sq mi)
- Elevation: 634 m (2,080 ft)

Population (2025-01-01)
  - Total: 431
  - Density: 7.4/km^{2} (19/sq mi)
- Time zone: UTC+1 (CET)
  - Summer (DST): UTC+2 (CEST)
- Postal code: 09280
- Website: http://www.pancorbo.es/

Pancorbo is a municipality and town located in the province of Burgos, Castile and León, Spain. According to the 2004 census (INE), the municipality has a population of 464 inhabitants.
