= Cerezo de Río Tirón =

- Municipality and town
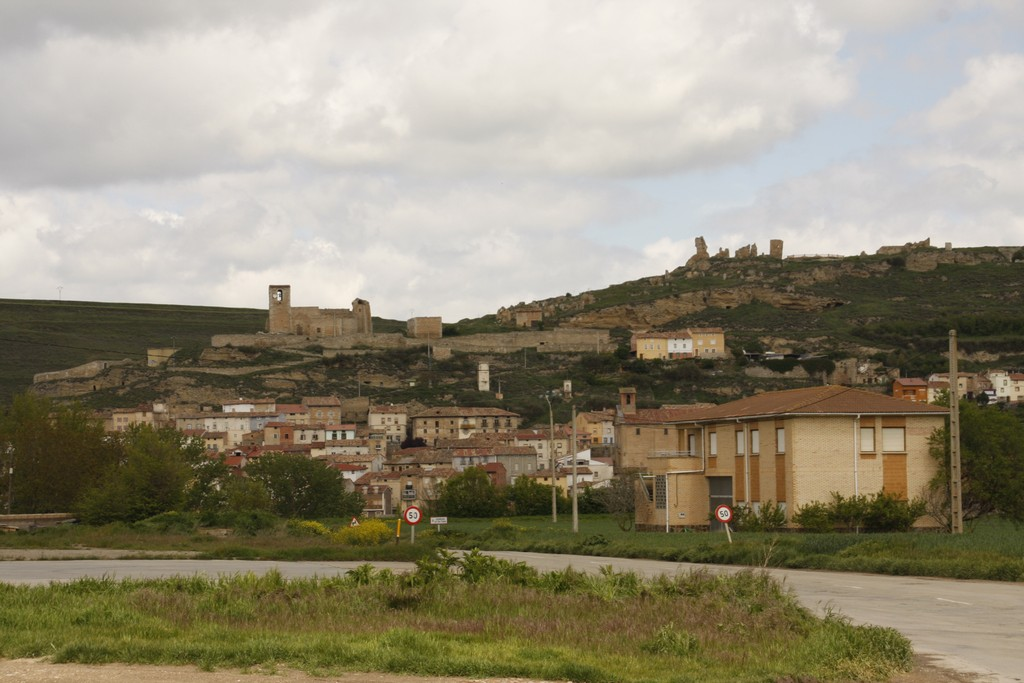
- View of Cerezo Río Tirón, 2010

- Flag Coat of arms

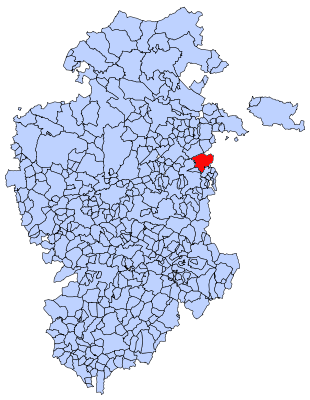
- Municipal location of Cerezo de Río Tirón in Burgos province

- Location in Spain.
- Coordinates: 42°29′27″N 3°8′8″W
- Country: Spain
- Autonomous community: Castile and León
- Province: Burgos
- Comarca: Montes de Oca

Government
  - Mayor: Raúl Sobrino Garrido (PSOE)

Area
  - Total: 60.92 km^{2} (23.52 sq mi)
- Elevation: 663 m (2,175 ft)

Population (2025-01-01)
  - Total: 467
  - Density: 7.67/km^{2} (19.9/sq mi)
- Time zone: UTC+1 (CET)
  - Summer (DST): UTC+2 (CEST)
- Postal code: 09270
- Website: http://www.cerezoderiotiron.es/

Cerezo de Río Tirón is a municipality located in the province of Burgos, Castile and León, Spain.
