= Battle of Cellorigo =

Battle of Cellorigo may refer to either of two battles that took place at Cellorigo:

- First Battle of Cellorigo, 882
- Second Battle of Cellorigo, 883

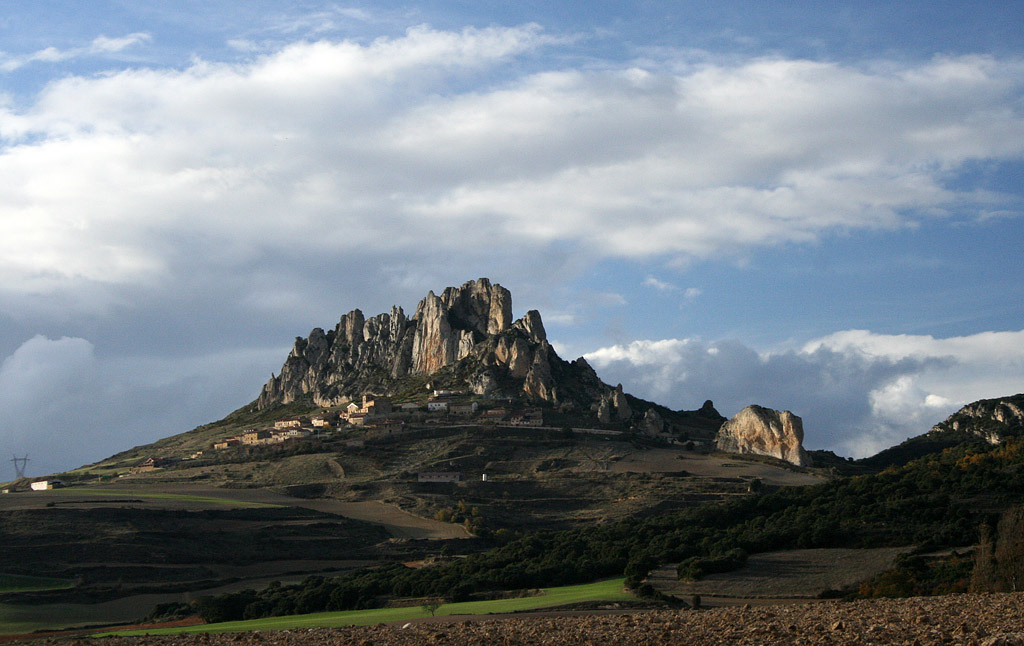
Cellorigo in the region of La Rioja, Spain with view to the natural monument of Peñas de Cellorigo.
