= Spain in the Middle Ages =

Period of Spanish history from 408 to 1492

Spain in the Middle Ages is a period in the history of what would eventually later become Spain that began in the 5th century following the fall of the Western Roman Empire and ended with the beginning of the early modern period in 1492.

The history of Spain and Portugal is marked by waves of conquerors who brought their distinct cultures to the Iberian Peninsula. After the migration of the Vandals and Alans down the Mediterranean coast of Hispania from 408, the history of medieval Hispania begins with the Iberian kingdom of the Arianist Visigoths (507–711), who were converted to Catholicism along with their king Reccared in 587. Visigothic culture can be seen as a phenomenon of Late Antiquity as much as part of the Age of Migrations.

From Northern Africa in 711, the Muslim Umayyad Caliphate crossed into the Iberian Peninsula, at the invitation of a Visigothic clan to assist it in rising against King Roderic. Over the period 711–788, the Umayyads conquered most of the lands of the Visigothic kingdom of Hispania and established the territory known as Al-Andalus. A revolt during the conquest established the Christian Kingdom of Asturias in the north of the Peninsula.

Much of the period is marked by conflict between the Muslim and Christian states, referred to as the Reconquista, or the Reconquest (i.e., The Christians "reconquering" their lands as a religious crusade). The border between Muslim and Christian lands wavered southward through 700 years of war, which marked the Peninsula as a militarily contested space. The medieval centuries also witnessed episodes of warfare between the Christian states and between the Muslim taifas, successor states of the Caliphate of Cordoba. Wars between the Crown of Aragon and the Crown of Castile were sparked by dynastic rivalries or disagreements over tracts of land conquered or to be conquered from the Muslim south.

The Middle Ages in Hispania are often said to end in 1492 with the final acts of the Reconquista in the capitulation of the Nasrid Emirate of Granada and the Alhambra decree ordering the expulsion of the Jews. Early modern Spain was first united as an institution in the reign of Charles V, Holy Roman Emperor as Charles I of Spain.

== Early medieval Hispania ==
When the Germanic tribes invaded the provinces of the Roman Empire, the hordes, urged forward by the pressure of the Huns in their rear, hurled themselves for the first time upon the Pyrenean Peninsula – the Alani, a people of Scythian, or Tatar, ethnicity; the Vandals and Suebians, Germanic ethnicity. The Alani were, for the most part, quickly brought into subjection. The Vandals temporarily established themselves in Baetica and then passed on into Africa, while the Visigoths hemmed in the Suebi in Galicia until the latter were completely brought under control. These Visigoths, or Western Goths, after sacking Rome under the leadership of Flavius Alaricus (410), turned towards the Iberian Peninsula, with Flavius Ataulfus for their leader, and occupied the northeastern portion, after becoming part of the Empire themselves as foederati and Roman citizens (thanks to the Constitutio Antoniniana). Wallia extended his rule over most of the peninsula, keeping the Suebians shut up in Galicia. Theodoric I took part, with the Gallo-Romans and Franks (also foederati and Roman citizens), in the Battle of the Catalaunian Plains, where Attila was routed.

Flavius Euricus (466), who declared the independence of his kingdom from the western administration, may be considered the first monarch of Spain, though the Suebians still maintained their independence in Galicia. Euric was also the first king to give written laws to the Visigoths. In the following reigns the Catholic kings of France assumed the role of protectors of the Hispano-Roman Catholics against the Arianism of the Visigoths, and in the wars which ensued Alaric II and Amalaric lost their lives.

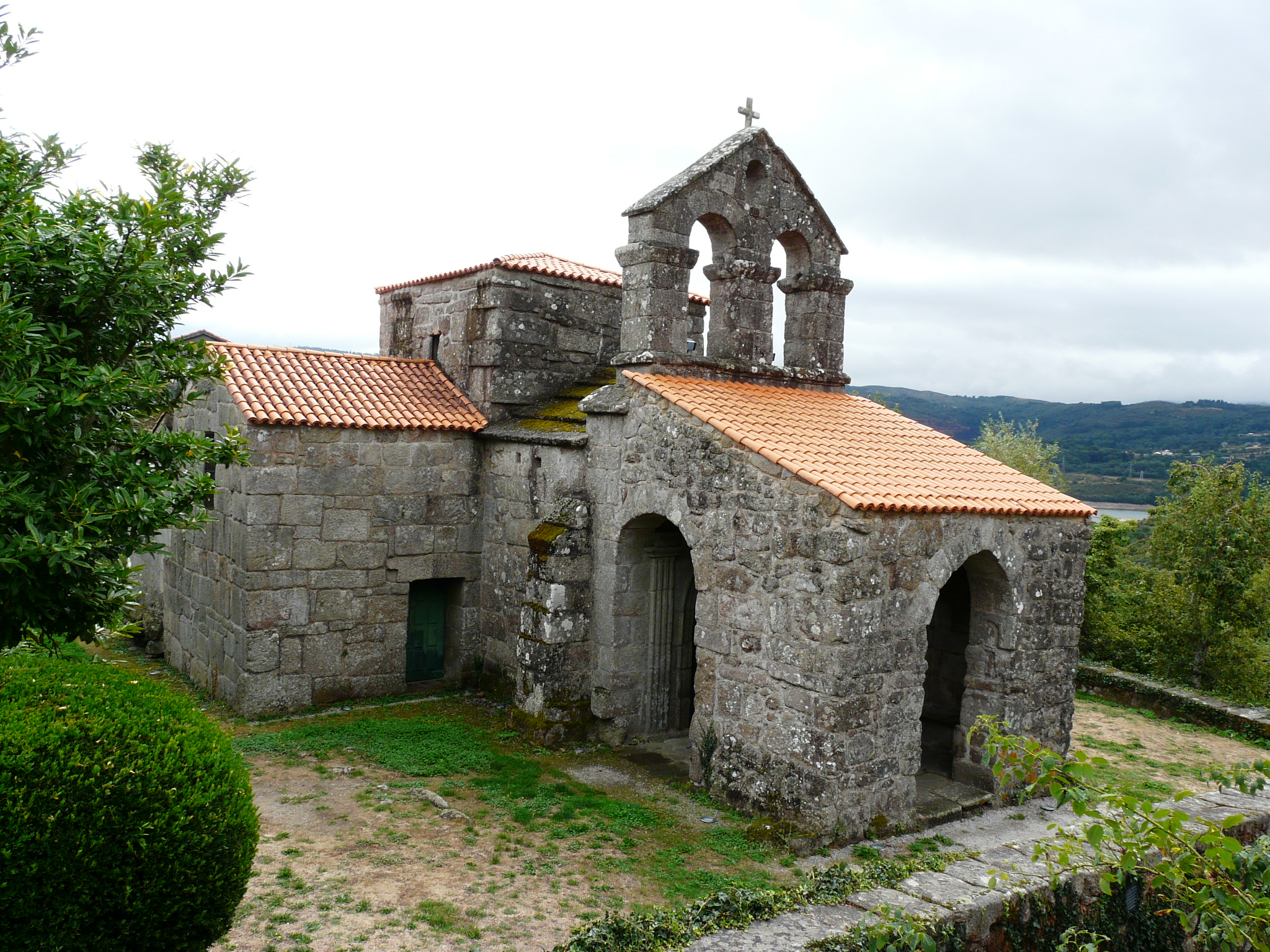
Visigothic church of Santa Comba de Bande, Ourense. Galicia, Spain.

Athanagild, having risen against King Agila, called in the "Byzantines" (Eastern Romans) and, in payment for the succour they gave him, ceded to them the maritime places of the southeast (554). Flavius Leovigildus restored the political unity of the peninsula, subduing the Suebians, but the religious divisions of the country, reaching even the royal family, brought on a civil war. St. Hermengild, the king's son, putting himself at the head of the Catholics, was defeated and taken prisoner, and suffered martyrdom for rejecting communion with the Arians. Reccared, son of Liuvigild and brother of St. Hermengild, added religious unity to the political unity achieved by his father, accepting the Catholic faith in the Third Council of Toledo (589).

Sisebut and Suintila completed the expulsion of the Byzantines from Spain. Chindasuinth and Recceswinth laboured for legislative unity, and legalized marriages, hitherto prohibited, between Goths and Ibero Hispanic. In 711, North African Berber soldiers with some Arabs commanded by Tariq ibn Ziyad crossed the Strait of Gibraltar, engaging a Visigothic force led by King Roderic at the Battle of Guadalete in a moment of serious in-fighting and division across the Visigothic Kingdom.

== Medieval Islamic Iberian Peninsula ==
Islam in the Iberian Peninsula began in 711 when Arab and Berber troops made their way via the Strait of Gibraltar and swiftly took control. The Muslims even made their way up into what would eventually become France but were defeated at the Battle of Tours. This commenced a three-hundred-year period of cultural and economic flourishing on the Iberian peninsula, comparable to cities such as Baghdad and Constantinople regarding commerce and valuable products. Much wealth was created during this time due to the slave trade. Under Muslim rule, the Iberian peninsula became a center of knowledge, unlike the prior Visigoths. They revolutionized the political structures by bringing in ambassadors from Egypt, Tunisia, Saxony, and Byzantium. The mosque became the hub of learning during this period. Muslims also introduced such innovations as the water wheel and complex irrigation systems. With many ethnicities and religions, people debated about God and moral issues. Muslims were tolerant of other groups which contrasts with the Christian's’ approach. Furthermore, there is little evidence of Arab women moving to the Peninsula, strengthening the argument for cultural diversity because Christian and Jewish women intermarried with Muslims.

Muslims started to lose control of the Southern Peninsula after the defeat at Toledo in 1085. Christians began making their way into Al-Andalus until they captured Grenada in 1492 ending the Muslim rule. Some Muslims stayed but were ultimately driven out in 1610 by Phillip III.

== Medieval Judaic Sepharad ==
Historical evidence of a Jewish presence in medieval Sepharad, the Jewish name for the Peninsula, is mostly concentrated in the Kingdom of Aragon, with Girona as one of the flourishing centers of this culture. In the early Middle Ages, under Visigothic rule, Jews faced heavy prosecution and their presence was scarce. This took a turn when Spain was conquered by the Muslims in 711. Although Muslims were not perfect in their treatment of Jews they gave them the freedom that was originally absent. The cities of Grenada and Seville hosted a sizable Jewish community. Many Jews were employed as merchants, physicians, and courtiers. However, this was not the majority. Many Jews were subject to lowly jobs such as executioners, jailors, and peddlers. As stated above many Muslims hired the Jews for their court. Furthermore, each group constantly interacted with each other creating many business relationships. Nonetheless, Muslims still expressed a strong disdain for Jews labeling them as traitors leeches and snakes for their rejection of Islam.

Jewish women are sort of a mystery to historians. They made up half of the Jewish population in the Peninsula at the time, but very little is known about them. It seems that Jewish women were responsible for all household responsibilities. They also carried out religious ceremonies.

Things started to go deteriorate for the Jews once Muslims started losing control of the Peninsula. The success of Jews depended on whether Muslims had power. Once Christians took majority control in the territory many Jews either converted or fled concluding this chapter of Jewish migration.

== Medieval Christians Hispania ==
The Romans initially brought Christianity to the Iberian Peninsula. There is evidence of martyrs in the third century. By the fourth century, church councils were held throughout the main Roman cities. The Romans would then fall to the Visigoths in 409. The Visigoths were not Christian initially, but by the sixth century, King Recared held councils regarding Christianity in Toledo. The Visigothic rule would end in 711 when the Arabs conquered the peninsula. Muslims remained in control for the next three centuries. However, Christianity was still tolerated under this Muslim governance, and much of the northern regions of the Peninsula remained Christian. Most Christians at this time were poor and lived in rural areas. By the start of the eleventh century, the Muslim caliphate had split into Taifas. The Christians took notice of the Muslim's declining power and started attacking from the North and the East, in Catalonia. The most important battle in the Christians's reclaiming of the Peninsula was Alfonso VI's victory at Toledo in 1085. The church of Santiago di Compostela brought many pilgrims into the region. Along with religion spreading many political and economic ideas were being communicated by this influx of outsiders. Christians began the Middle Ages with control over the Peninsula and would then lose it and reclaim it again.

=== The Reconquista ===
The fugitive Goths found a retreat in those mountains where the Romans had never been able to effectively establish their authority; only a few years after the Battle of Guadalete (711), they gained a victory over Alqama in the Battle of Covadonga (718 or 722). Don Pelayo, or Pelagius, the Gothic chieftain who was victor at Covadonga, was acclaimed king, and took up his residence at Cangas de Onís. His son Favila was killed while hunting, torn to pieces by a bear, and was succeeded by Alfonso I, son-in-law of Don Pelayo, who expanded his kingdom as far as Galicia and Tierra de Campos (the "Gothic Fields" or Campos Góticos).

Fruela I (who came to power in 757) founded Oviedo. He was assassinated, and was succeeded by several kings (Aurelius, Silo, Mauregato, and Bermudo I, the Deacon) and at last Alfonso II, the Chaste, who set up his court at Oviedo, recommenced the great expeditions against the Muslims, and seems to have invited Charlemagne to come to Asturias, thus occasioning the Frankish monarch's expedition which ended in the disaster of Roncevaux. The Vikings invaded Galicia in 844 but were expelled by Ramiro I from A Coruña; 70 Viking ships were captured and burned. Vikings returned to Galicia in 859, during the reign of Ordoño I. They were faced with an army led by Don Pedro who dispersed them and destroyed 38 of their ships. Alfonso III, the Great, continued the forays as far as the Sierra Morena, and founded Burgos, the future capital of Castile. His sons rebelled against him, and he abdicated the crown, dividing his dominions among them. With him ended the Kingdom of Asturias, the territory of which soon became subject to León.

Another rallying-point of the Reconquest was Aragón; the other two, Navarre and Catalonia, were placed by the circumstances of their origin in peculiar relations with France. The Basques on either side of the Western Pyrenees dissatisfied with Frankish rule, rebelled on several occasions. At Roncevaux they annihilated the forces of Charlemagne, and in 824 another victory secured the independence of the Basques of Pamplona. The names and dates of their kings, or chieftains, are very uncertain until we come to Sancho II, Abarca. He abdicated in favour of his son, García II, the Trembler, in whose time the Leónese and Navarrese together were routed at Valdejunquera. Sancho III, the Great, was one of the monarchs who most influenced Spanish history; he was eventually King of Navarre, Castile, Aragón, and Sobrarbe. At his death (1035) he divided his kingdoms, giving Navarre to his eldest son García, Castile, with the title of King, to Fernando, Aragón to Ramiro, and Sobrarbe to Gonzálo.

=== Unification of Spain ===
Several difficulties stood in the way to the union of the various states formed in Spain by the Reconquest. Navarre and Catalonia were in particularly close contact with France, and the marriage of Ramón Berenguer the Great with Dulcia, heiress of Provence, made the relations between the peoples of the langue d'oc so close that the subsequent development of Catalonia was connected rather with that of the South of France. In Navarre, when the dynasty of Sancho the Elder became extinct, the Crown passed in succession to the houses of Blois (1234) of France, and of Évreux (1349–1441), with the result that Navarre, until the 15th century, lived in much closer relations with the French monarchy than with the Spanish states. On the other hand, the feudal system introduced in the western kingdoms by the House of Navarre brought about repeated partitions of states. Ferdinand I divided his kingdom into five parts, Castile, León, Galicia, Zamora, and Toro, though his son Sancho the Strong despoiled his brothers and restored the kingdom to unity. But Alfonso VII separated Castile and León, leaving the former to his son Sancho, and the latter to Ferdinand I.

Another result of feudal customs being introduced by the Burgundian princes was the separation of Portugal. For Alfonso VI gave his daughters Urraca and Teresa in marriage to Raymond of Burgundy and Henry of Burgundy respectively who founded two dynasties: that of Portugal, and that of Castile and León, which began with Alfonso VII. The Kingdoms of Asturias, Galicia, León, and Castile were united under Ferdinand III, heir of León through his father Alfonso IX, and of Castile through his mother Berengaria. In the same way Catalonia and Aragon entered into a personal union by the marriage of Ramon Berenguer IV with Doña Petronila, daughter of Ramiro the Monk, of Aragón.

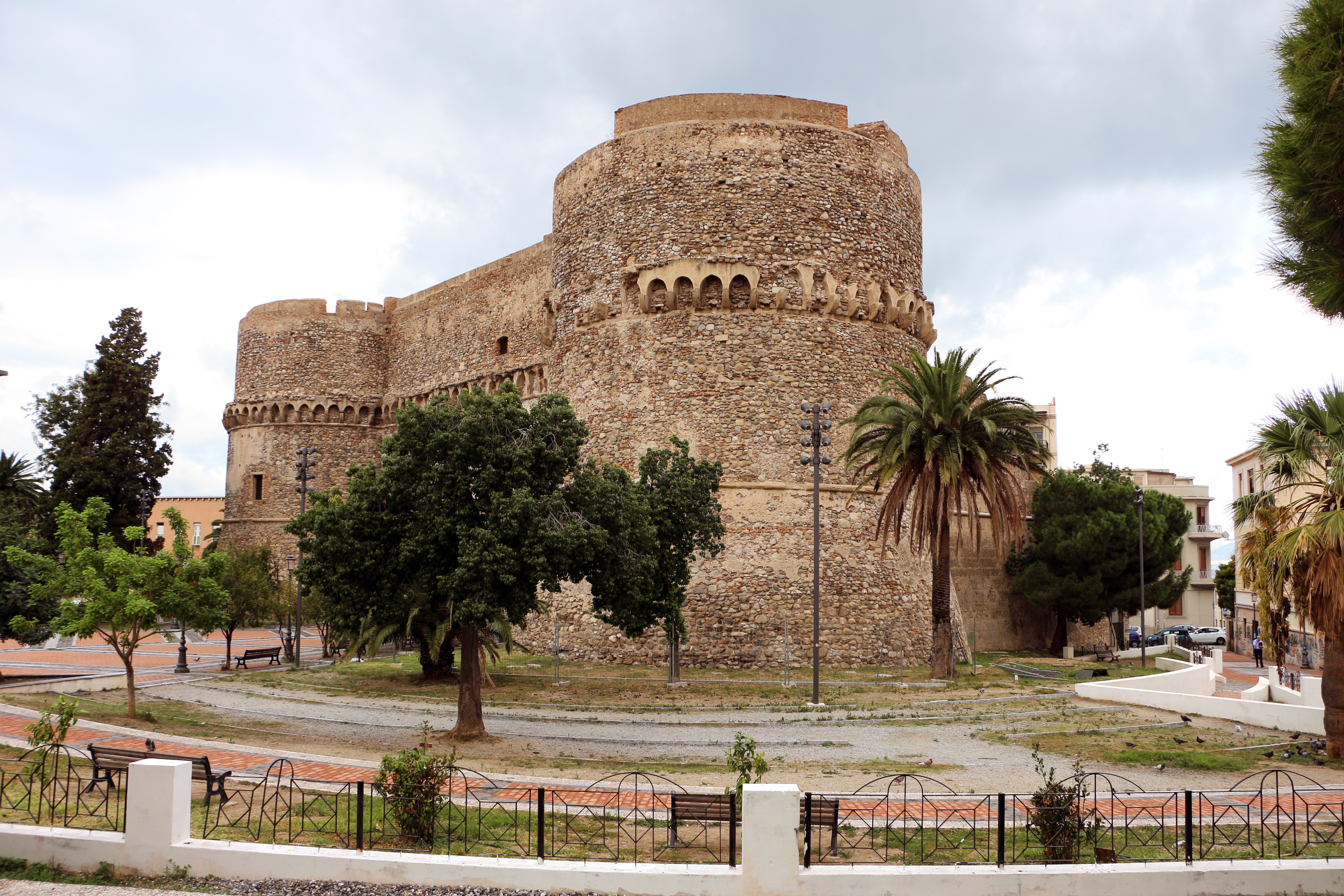
Aragonese Castle in Reggio Calabria, Italy

The monarchy formed by the dynastic union of Aragon and Catalonia was the first to complete the Reconquest in their regional area, they then directed their strength eastward. Peter II the Catholic, sovereign of Aragon and Catalonia, went to Rome to seek the annulment of his marriage with Maria of Montpellier and to have himself crowned by the pope. The former purpose he failed to accomplish; the latter occasioned him a great deal of trouble, as the Aragónese nobles refused to recognize the position of vassalage to the Holy See in which Peter had placed his kingdom. These nobles then forced for the first time the union, which was the cause of such serious disturbances until Peter IV with his dagger cut in pieces the document which recorded it. Peter II the Catholic, fell in the Battle of Muret (1213), defending his Albigensian kinsmen against Simon de Montfort, whom Innocent III had sent against them. His son, James I, the Conqueror, completed the Catalan-Aragonese conquest, winning Majorca (1228) and Valencia (1238) besides helping his son-in-law, Alfonso X, to complete the conquest of Murcia. His son and successor gave new direction to Catalan-Aragónese policy by enforcing the rights of his wife, Constance, to the kingdoms of Sicily and Naples. Profiting by the rising of the Sicilian Vespers against the Angevins (1282), he gained Sicily and attacked Naples.

This conquest, however, placed the kings of Aragon in a position of antagonism with the popes, who defended the rights of the House of Anjou. Martin IV, having excommunicated Peter III, led the Aragónese nobles to take advantage in extending their privileges at the expense of royal power. The demands of the nobles increased in the reign of Alfonso III, who was forced to confirm to them the famous Privilegio de la Union. James II became reconciled with the Holy See, accepting Corsica and Sardinia in lieu of Sicily. Peter IV, the Ceremonious, defeated the nobles at Epila (1348) and used his dagger to cut in pieces the charter they had extorted from his predecessors. In the meantime, the Catalans and Aragónese who were left in Sicily offered themselves to Emperor Andronikos II Palaiologos to fight the Turks. Having conquered them, they turned their arms against the Greeks, who treacherously slew their leaders; but for this treachery the Spaniards, under Bernard of Rocafort and Berenguer of Entenca, exacted the terrible penalty which is celebrated in history as "The Catalan Vengeance" and moreover seized the Duchies of Athens and Neopatras (1313). The royal line of Barcelona-Aragon became extinct with Martin the Humane, and the Compromise of Caspe (1412) gave the Crown to the dynasty of Castile, thus facilitating a future dynastic union. Alfonso V, the Magnanimous, once more turned Aragonese policy to the direction of Italy, where he possessed the Kingdom of Sicily and acquired that of Naples by having himself made adoptive son of Queen Joanna. With these events began the Italian wars which were not to end until the 18th century.

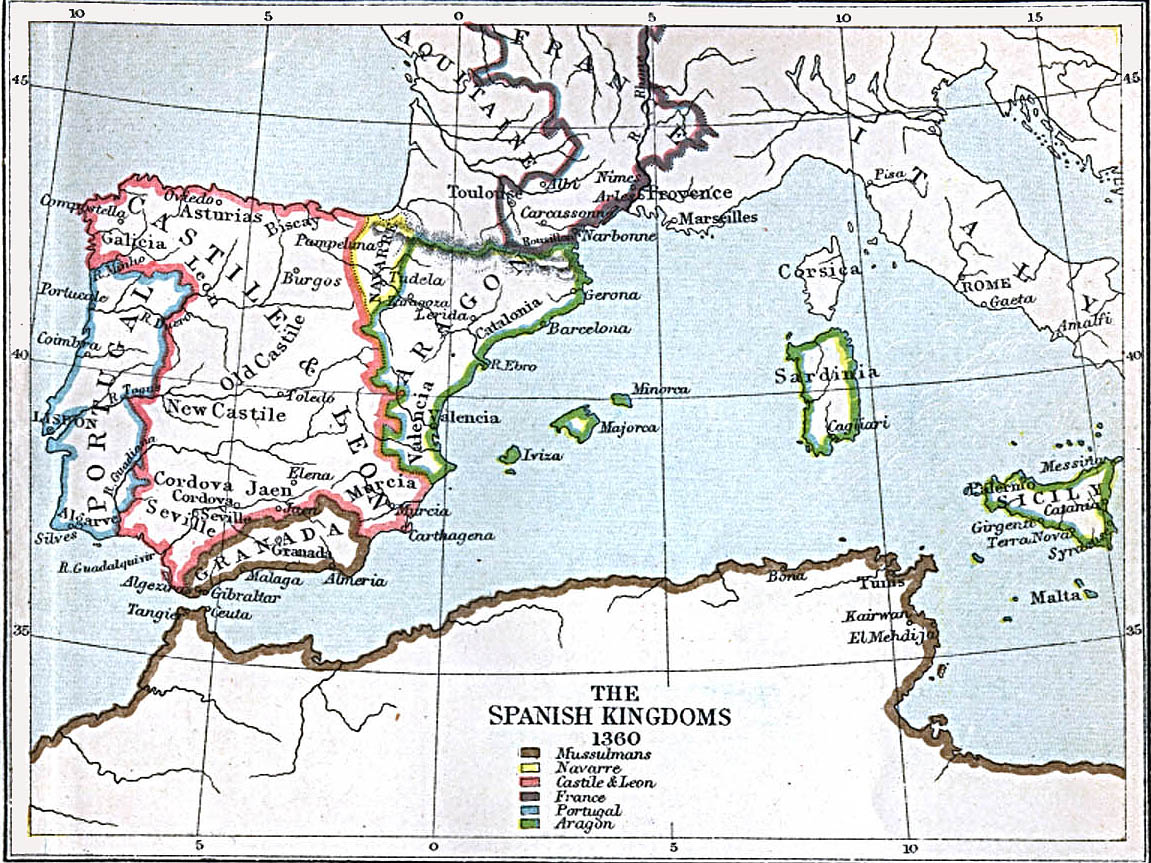
The Spanish kingdoms in 1360

Meanwhile, the Reconquest languished in Castile; at first, because of the candidacy of Alfonso X for the crown of the Holy Roman Empire, in which candidacy he had secured a majority of the electoral princes. This was followed by a disputed succession to the throne, the rival claimants being the Cerda heirs (sons of Fernando, the eldest son of Alfonso X) and the second son of Sancho IV. Later, Ferdinand IV succeeded to the throne at the age of nine, being under the tutelage of his mother María de Molina. Alfonso XI was little more than one year old when his father died (1312); and though his reign was in many respects glorious, and he overcame the Marinids in the Battle of Río Salado (1340), still his relationship with Eleanor de Guzmán, by whom he had several children, resulted in the wars of the following reign, that of Pedro the Cruel, who was at last slain by his bastard brother, Henry of Trastámara, and succeeded on the throne as Henry II. John I, who married Beatrice of Portugal (1383), sought to unite the two kingdoms on the death of Ferdinand, the last King of Portugal of the Burgundian line. The Portuguese, however, defeated John of Castile at the Battle of Aljubarrota (1385), and the Portuguese Crown went to the Master of Aviz, who became John I of Portugal. Henry III, who married Catherine of Lancaster, was the first to take the title of Prince of Asturias as heir to the Crown, which he inherited during his minority, as did his son, John II.

== Culture ==
In the post-Roman period before 711, the history of the Spanish language began with Old Spanish; the other Latin-derived Hispanic languages with a considerable body of literature are Catalan (which had a relevant golden age of Valencian), and to a lesser degree Aragonese. Asturian Medieval Spanish, Galician and Basque were primarily oral.

Alfonso X commissioned a translation of an Arabic work on chess, dice and tables games called the Libro de los Juegos in 1283. The work contains information on the playing of chess, with over 100 chess problems and chess variants. The king also co-authored several works of music such as the Cantigas d'escarnio e maldicer and the Cantigas de Santa Maria in Galician-Portuguese. The latter contains more than 400 poems alongside musical notation, and currently forms one of the largest collections of songs to have survived from the Middle Ages.

== Main cities ==
Medieval Spain was as much as a network of cities as it was interconnected provinces. Cities were cultural and administrative centers, the seats of bishops and sometimes kings, with markets and housing expanding from a central fortified stronghold. Medieval Spanish history can easily be followed through these major cities:

- Barcelona
- Bilbao
- Burgos
- Córdoba
- Granada
- León
- Málaga
- Murcia
- Oviedo
- Salamanca
- Santander
- Santiago de Compostela
- Seville
- Toledo
- Valencia
- Valladolid
- Zaragoza

== See also ==
- Spanish chivalry
- Medieval Spanish literature
- Orders, decorations, and medals of Spain
