= Asturias in the Reconquista =

Historical period

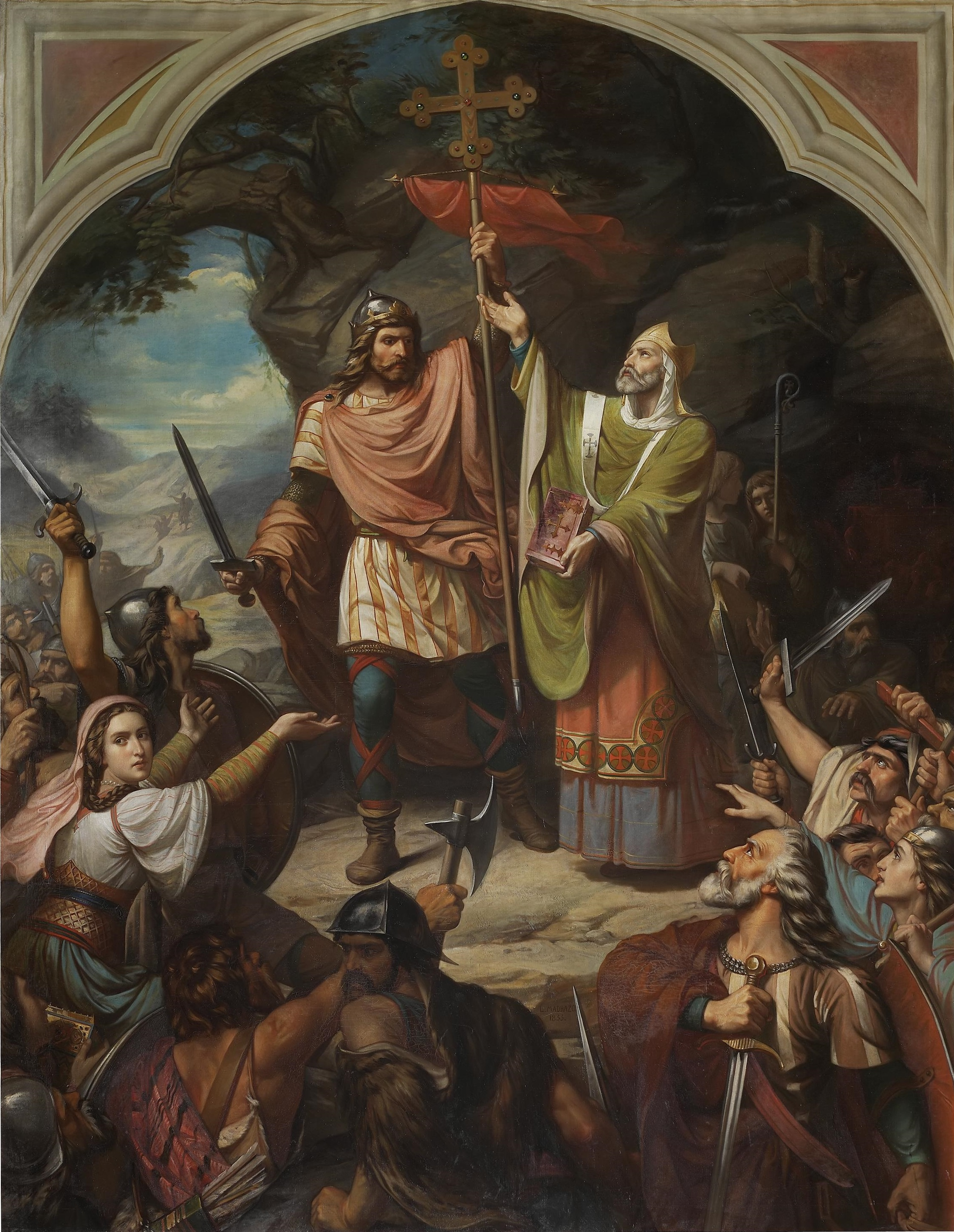
19th century paiting of Pelagius at the Battle of Covadonga.

The participation of the Kingdom of Asturias in the Reconquista took place from the moment the Battle of Covadonga was fought in 722 until the realm was partitioned between the three sons of Alfonso III in 910. León fell to his eldest son Garcia, while Galicia was attributed to his second eldest Ordoño, and Asturias proper fell to Fruela II.

At the time of the Ummayyad invasion of the Iberian Peninsula, the Visigothic kingdom was divided between two claimants to its throne, Roderic and Achila II. Roderic was routed and killed at the Battle of Guadalete, with a swift occupation of nearly the entire peninsula following. The fate of Achilla is unknown but he may have fallen in combat and been succeeded by Ardo. Though the Ummayyads duly occuppied the south, most of the mountainous north avoided their rule. This allowed Pelagius to organize a revolt and expel Muslim forces from Asturias at the Battle of Covadonga, considered the start of the Reconquista.

The lands of Asturias were mountainous, sparsely populated, economically modest, and ethnically diverse, with the Crown, the Church and resistance to Islam forming the unifying factors. Though the first few decades of its existence as an independent kingdom were a struggle for survival, internal conflict within al-Andalus allowed Asturias to expand into Galicia in the 740s and by 760 a clear objective had formed around the restoration of the Visigothic monarchy throughout the entire Peninsula. By 812 the suppression of the kingdom was definitively beyond the capacity of Cordoba.

Asturias was of major importance for the foundation of the modern-day countries of Portugal and Spain. Portugal was first created as a county of Asturias before later becoming independent. The kingdoms of León and Galicia were broken off from Asturias and Castile was broken off from León but they would later be reunited and eventually merged with the Crown of Aragon. The conquest of Granada in the late 15th century and of Navarre in the early 16th sealed the formation of the modern-day territory of Spain on the Iberian Peninsula.

== History ==
In 711, the Iberian Peninsula was invaded by a mostly Berber army led by Tariq ibn Ziyad, but the Visigothic kingdom was divided at that time. Roderic had usurped the throne in a coup and the northeast remained loyal to Achilla II. Roderic was in the north fighting the Basques when he received news of Tariqs landing and marched south with his forces to meet the threat. At the Battle of Guadalete however, Roderic was routed in battle, the commonly accepted explanation being that disloyal subordinates discontented with his usurpation deserted him with their forces in the middle of combat. He was said to have drowned in a nearby marsh or river, but his body was never found.

The Visigothic state was described as riddled with dissent, and when news spread that Roderic had been killed in battle, numerous local leaders were elected across various cities, such as Cordoba, Seville, Mérida and Granada, as well as the capital, Toledo. Roderics supporters were expelled from Toledo and they fled to Mérida, which became a bastion of defence. Nevertheless, most of the peninsula was quickly captured as most authorities surrendered to the advancing Ummayyad force and those who did not "fled to Galicia" according to Muslim accounts ("Galicia" meaning the mountainous north, and not just the region of Galicia specifically). Toledo was plundered, as were the adjacent regions. The peninsula was described as being devastated not just by the invading Muslims but by internal fighting among the Visigoths as well. Tariq was later joined by his superior, Musa Ibn Nusayr, who brought reinforcements from Africa and continued the conquest of the territory as far as Galicia proper before being recalled to Damascus.

The Pyrenean and Cantabrian mountain ranges in the far north were the only parts of the peninsula relatively untouched by the Muslim invasion. They had already remained outside of either Roman or Visigothic control. Musa Ibn Nusayr received deputations of Astorga, León, and Amaya during his advance north, and although he did not venture north of the Catabrian Mountains, a Berber commander known as Munuza later established himself at Gijón. Small pockets of Cantabrians as well as Visigoths organized under the precarious duchy of Cantabria resisted the Muslims in the more inaccessible parts of Asturias and eastern Cantabria.

=== Establishment of the Kingdom of Asturias under Pelagius ===
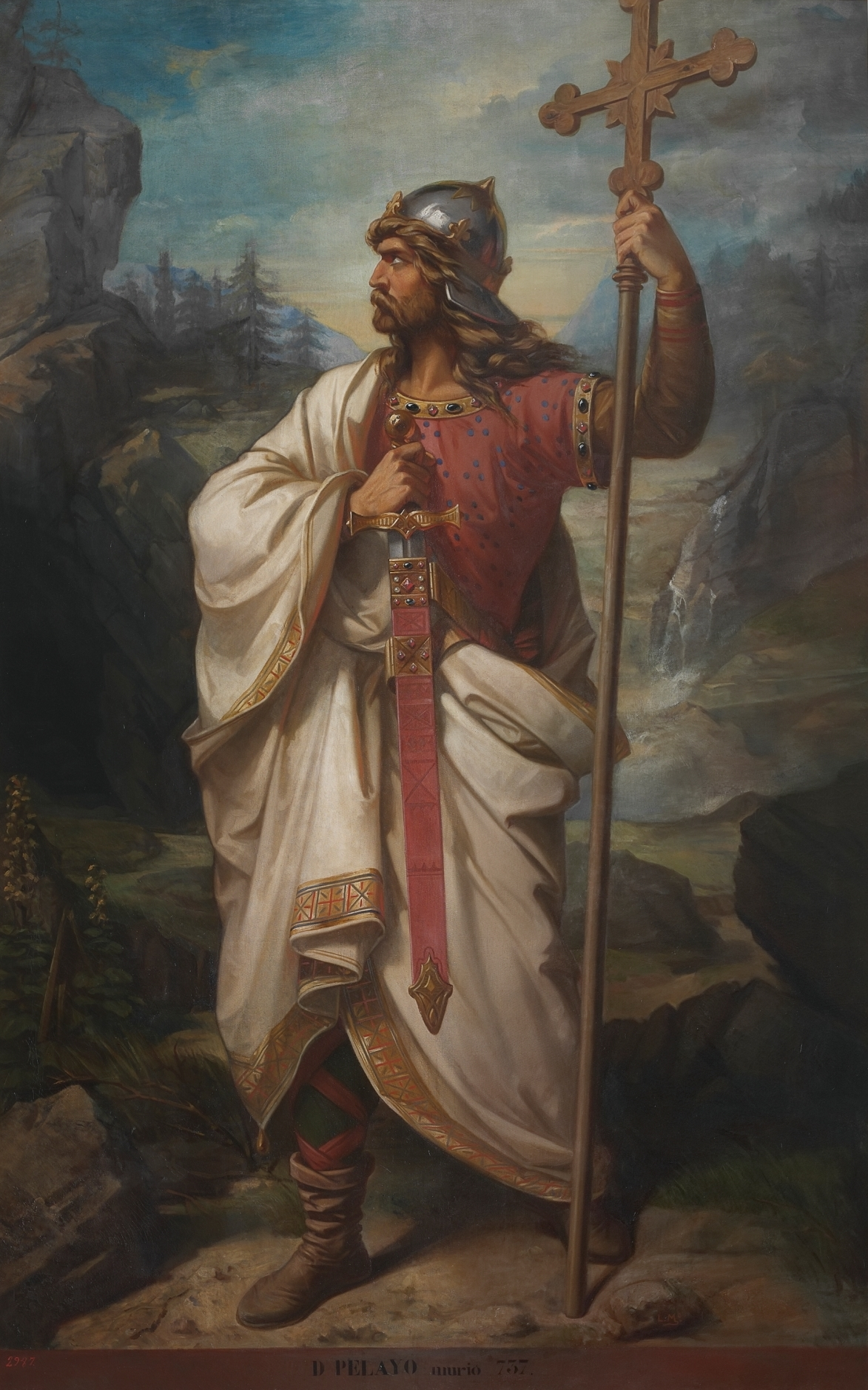
Pelagius, 19th century depiction.

The first to make a stand and stirr the Asturians against the Muslims was Pelagius, who was elected leader at a tribal council in about 718. The origins of Pelagius are uncertain and his name is not Gothic but Latinized Celtic. His stronghold lied in the Picos de Europa district of eastern Asturias. Under the leadership of Pelagius, the Asturians ambushed and destroyed a Muslim force commanded by Munuza at the Battle of Covadonga. Covadonga is considered the start of the Reconquista, or the reconquest of territory back to Christendom. Victory in battle gave Pelagius prestige, and he set up a village that served as his capital at Cangas de Onís, which Visigothic refugees helped build. His daughter Ermesinda later married Alfonso, son of the Visigothic duke Peter of Cantabria.

Life and society in Asturias was relatively simple compared to Al-Andalus, France or Italy. Communities in the mountains were entirely rural, largely self-sufficient and lived mostly by herding sheep and other cattle, as the moist and hilly land did not encourage agriculture. Crops were limited, skilled workers short in supply, and no cities existed. The kingdom was ethnically varied, with a population that included Hispano-Visigoths and Hispano-Suevi and Hispano-Romans with Celtic residues in Galicia, native Cantabrians and Basques, Mozarab immigrants from al-Andalus and small numbers of Berber captives, the only unifying factors being the Crown, the Catholic Church and resistance to Islam in a frontier territory.

The moutainous north was difficult for the Muslims to operate in, as their advantage lied in the open fields, and furthermore the region was considered under-populated and economically unattractive compared to the south, while the Arab leadership was distracted by internal quarrels. Nevertheless, under Pelagius the Asturians remained strictly on the defensive.

=== The reconquest of Galicia ===
Roman walls of Lugo.

Pelagius died in 737 and his son and successor, Favila, was killed by a bear two years later. He was succeeded by his brother-in-law, Alfonso I of Asturias. Thus the duchy of Cantabria and the kingdom of Asturias merged. In 740, the Berber Revolt broke out among the mostly Berber Muslim garrisons in the north due to injustices in the allocation of land among other things, and most of their numbers appear to have abandoned the cities or castles they had occupied to head south.

In 741 or 742, Alfonso took advantage of the rebellion and the reduced number of Muslim soldiers in Galicia to launch a series of campaigns west and southwest into the region, as far as the Douro. Lugo was retaken by Alfonso I without resistance. Tui and Orense were also reconquered. The diocese of Iria Flavia recognised the authority of Alfonso I. During his reign, all of Galicia was recovered from the Muslims.

=== The "desert of the Douro" ===
After Galicia had been secured, Alfonso turned his forces south. In the course of the following years he captured several towns as far as the river Douro such as Braga, Porto and Viseu in the modern-day territory of Portugal, and León, Astorga, Salamanca, Ledesma, Ávila, Simancas, Segóvia to the southeast, along with several less important towns. The paucity of his forces did not allow Alfonso to hold on to these lands however. Since he lacked the men to settle and defend the territory so far south, he had the Muslim garrisons executed and the Christian residents relocated further north, resulting in a vast no-mans-land in the Douro valley, which shielded Asturias from Al-Andalus and allowed it to develop its institutions. Alfonso I of Asturias rebuked treaties with the Muslims, and for this reason he became known as "the Catholic".

Alfonsos repopulation efforts resulted in the reestablishment of the episcopal see of Lugo under the guidance of Bishop Odoarius, a north-african or Iberian cleric who had headed north after hearing of Pelayos victories and Alfonsos ascent to the throne. Odoarius appears to have resettled a large portion of territory between the Minho and the Douro, including the settlements of Provesende, Abação, Gontim, Vermoim and Desteriz, probably with people who survived the Muslim incursions, with the patronage of Alfonso I. Alfonso also commenced the fortification of his eastern frontier with the construction of a long line of castles there, and which suggested the name for Castile. This was done to prevent Muslim armies from invading the heartland of Asturias through the old Roman road that lead northwest from Zaragoza, up the Ebro valley.

=== War with Cordoba, 789-812 ===
Geography of Asturias by the Lakes of Covadonga.

Hostilities between Asturias and Cordoba were suspended after the death of the militant Alfonso I in 757 and the only notable event in the next three decades was the foundation of Oviedo by his son Fruela I. In the reigns of Fruela, Aurelio, Silo and Mauregatus, Asturias was effectively reduced to a tributary vassal of Cordoba.

Mauregatus was succeed in 789 by Bermudo, who attacked the Muslims while they were tied down fighting the Carolingians in northeastern Iberia. Cordoba was then led by the dynamic Hisham I, who organized two armies, one commanded by Abdul-Malek to invade France through the Pyrenees, while another led by Yusuf Ibn Bohkt entered Galicia and sacked the region. The Asturians were then severely routed at the Battle of the Burbia River when they attempted to fight back the Muslims. This caused Bermudo to abdicate in 791 and Alfonso II was subsequently elected king.

Asturias was invaded by two Muslim armies in 794. One force commanded by Abdul-Karim attacked from the east, probably to destroy the border fortifications erected at Bardulia. He plundered the region and withdrew. Another force led by Abdu-l-malek invaded through Galicia. Oviedo was sacked, however on their way back the Muslims were ambushed and routed by the Asturians led personally by Alfonso II, at the Battle of Lutos. This was a swampland and Alfonso II realized the advantage in engaging at such location.

Northern Iberia Peninsula and the Kingdom of Asturias 791-842

Asturias was invaded again by forces commanded by Abdul-Karim in 795. The Asturians were routed at the Battle of Las Babias and Oviedo was sacked once more, though on that occasion the Muslims quickly withdrew from Asturias. As a result of these incursions, Alfonso II sought an alliance with Charlemagne.

Hisham I was succeed by the ruthless Al-Hakam I in 796. Despite major difficulties, Alfonso II was effectively able to prevent Asturias from being crushed, while the Andalus became rife with dissent. Rebellion sparked the same year Al-Hakam succeeded on the throne, and this allowed Alfonso II to lead a major raid that reached as far as Lisbon before turning back. By 812 al-Andalus was rife with civil conflict and Barcelona had been lost to the Franks. The peace signed that year with both Charlemagne and Alfonso II put an end to Cordobas attempts to destroy the nascent Asturias.

=== Peace, 812-815 ===
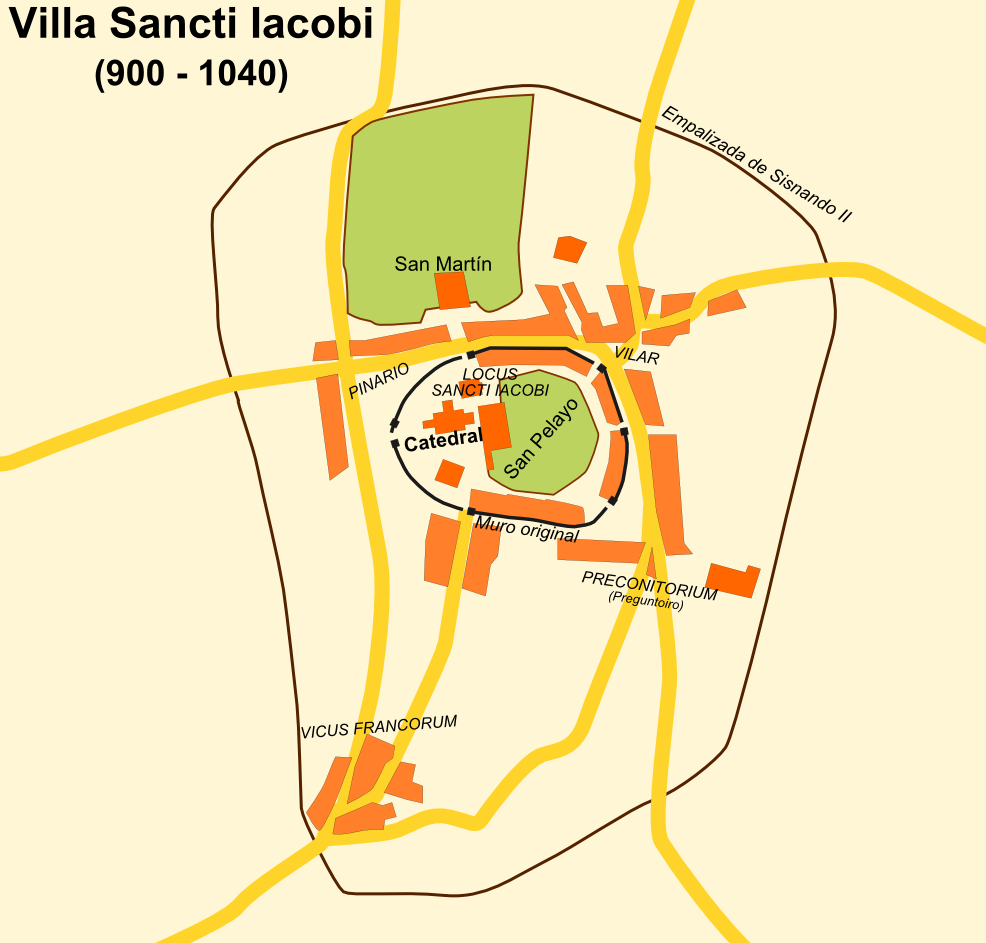
Santiago de Compostela, 900-1040

The year after the signing of peace with Cordoba, bishop Theodemir of Iria Flavia found the ruins of a chapel and a crypt with a set of tombs amidst thick growth in the woods of Libredón, following a report by Pelagius the Hermit. These turned out to be those of the Apostle Saint James and his two disciples, Theodore and Athanasius. News soon reached Oviedo and king Alfonso II promptly travelled to the place to personally inspect the shrine, accompanied by nobles of his Court, either motivated by piety or aware of the political importance of the matter to the Iberian Peninsula or himself. He funded the construction of a simple church of stone and mud on the occasion, though it was accompanied by a grant of land three miles in every direction. It was inaugurated with a sollemn procession of clergymen and nobles. Pope Leo III later sanctioned the rediscovery of the tomb upon being informed of it, and notified all bishops and archbishops throughout Christendom.

A monastery, houses and a hospital were built by the side of the new church. Iberian Christians had been forbidden by the Pope to travel to the Holy Land as crusaders, since the Muslims still remained in the peninsula. The tomb of Santiago thus became the site of great pilgrimage. Soon after a town developed nearby and it became known as Santiago de Compostela. Within a few years, Compostela grew into a settlement of considerable size, with numerous houses, monasteries, churches, hospitals and schools, as well as walls to protect it from Muslim or Norman attack. The body of St. James and his disciples would be transferred here in 829 for greater safety.

=== Development of Castile in the 9th century ===
The peace signed between Asturias and Cordoba in 812 did not prove lasting and hostilities resumed in 815. The Muslims raided Galicia in 825 and 838, both times departing from Viseu.

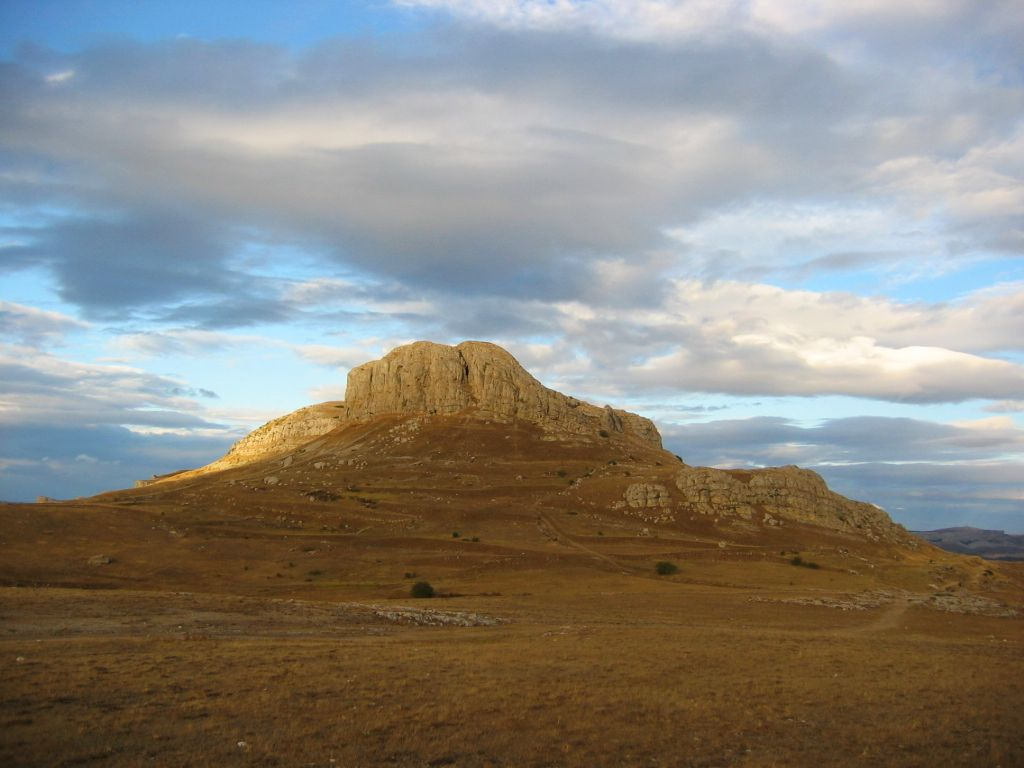
Amaya, resettled by initiative of Ordoño I.

While Galicia and central Asturias remained relatively out of reach of Cordoba, a new society gradually developed on the eastern frontier of the kingdom. Asturians, Cantabrians and Basques led by counts, bishops and magnates of Visigothic origin gradually advanced through the gap between the Cantabrian Mountains and Basque territory to settle on the edge of the Meseta Central and the upper reaches of the Ebro valley, controlled by the Muslims from the heavily fortified city of Zaragoza. The kings of Asturias granted the settlers of this frontier region considerable autonomy and they built their own monasteries, fortifications, and managed their own affairs when the kingdom was beset by internal upheaval during the reign of Ramiro I. Their laws were based entirely on costumary law and transmitted in vernacular, in contrast with the semi-romanized code in Latin used elsewhere in Asturias. Thus a composite society largely ethnically Cantabrian or Basque, Visigothic in custom and speaking its own romance language emerged in Old Castile.

=== Further expansion south ===
The reconquest of territory towards the south was resumed under the rule of Ordoño I, who succeeded Ramiro in 850. Two years later, the city of Toledo rose in rebellion against Cordoba and sought assistance from Asturias as well as the Basque kingdom of Pamplona. Ordoño and king García Íñiguez of Pamplona marched out with their forces and linked up with the Toledo rebels, however they were routed at the battle of Guadalacete by Ummayyad forces which the emir Muhammad I of Córdoba commanded in person. The city of Toledo would, however, remain in open revolt and would not be subdued for another six years.

While Cordoba was occupied with internal conflict, Tui was occupied in the west, while Ordoño occupied León in 856. León became the new capital of the kingdom.

Ordoño razed a Muslim stronghold at Albelda, south of Logroño, in 859. This action later became the basis for the myth of the Battle of Clavijo. After razing Albelda, Ordoño defeated a force of Vikings who had made a landing on Asturian soil and fought the Basques before engaging the Muslims once more. He led a major raid into al-Andalus, sacking Coria and Salamanca among other minor settlements, before marching west into the modern-day territory of Portugal and back to Asturias again, loaded with spoils.

Emir Muhammad organized a retaliatory campaign in 862 and another in 863. In the latter year, the Muslims entered Asturias through Álava and Castille but they were ambushed and severely routed in a bloody battle, probably at Pancorbo. The consequences must have be severe, as Cordoba launched no attack against Asturias the following year.

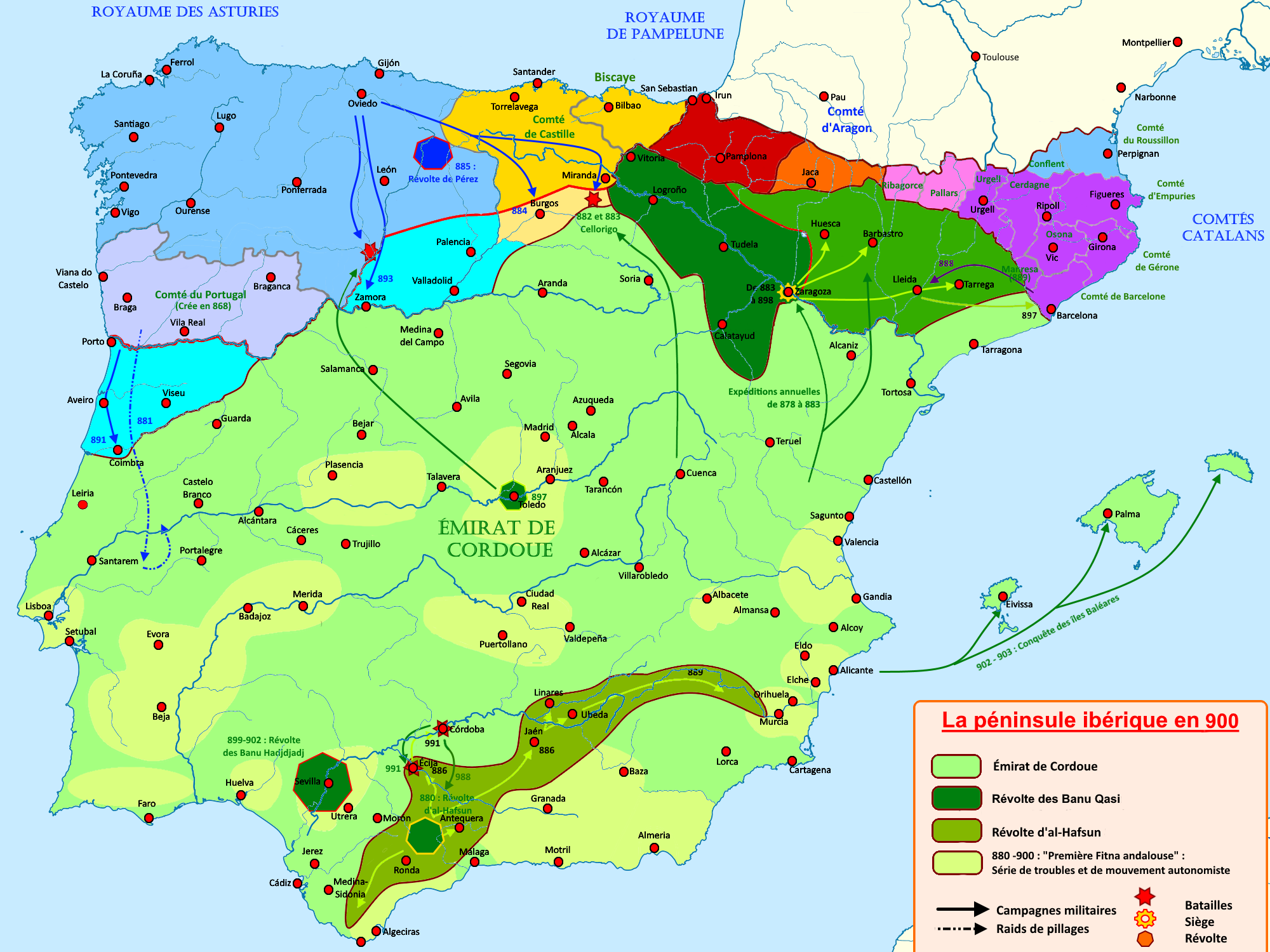
The Iberian Peninsula by 900.

Ordoño died in 866 and was succeeded by Alfonso III, who is considered the greatest monarch of the kingdom of Asturias. He took the chance to push the border of Asturias south as far as the river Douro when Ibn Marwan revolted against emir Muhammad I of Córdoba in 868. Vímara Peres seized the town of Porto that same year acting on the orders of Alfonso, and became the first count of Portugal. The capture of the surrounding territory continued and two years later Braga was resettled, its territory being organized under the personal guidance of Vímara Peres. Count Odoário seized Chaves in 872, and from this city the process of capture and resettlement of the mountainous Trás-os-Montes began, first in and around the fertile lands of the Chaves valley.

The city of Coimbra was seized by Count Hermenegildo Guterres in 878. Other locations south of the Douro were also taken by order of Alfonso III on the occasion, such as Viseu, Lamego, and Anégia. That same year, the Muslims attempted an uncursion into Asturias, however they were routed at the Battle of Polvoraria.

By 880, Castilian frontiersmen had reached the banks of the river Arlanzón, which prompted a reaction from Cordoba. The Muslims were, however, repulsed at the First Battle of Cellorigo in 882, and again at the Second Battle of Cellorigo in 883, when the then heir of Cordoba al-Mundhir twice tried to seize the stronghold of Cellorigo. Although the Muslim campaigns of 882-883 caused much damage in the region, the destruction of the network of castles and fortifications erected on the Castilian frontier was by that point beyond the capacity of Cordoba.

After an unsuccessful siege of Zamora, a truce for three years was agreed between Alfonso III and emir Al-Mundhir of Córdoba. When the truce lapsed, the Muslims secured a victory at Aybar but the Asturians afterwards retaliated with a major raid that reached as far south as Sierra Morena. The Asturians agreed to a second truce, on the condition that the bodies of the martyr saints Eulogius and Leocricia should be delivered to Oviedo, which was carried out.

Battle of the Day of Zamora, in 901.

Zamora was captured and fortified in 893, followed by Simancas in 899 and Toro in 900, with Dueñas also being captured about this time. The establishment of the heavily fortified Zamora-Toro-Simancas-Dueñas line was so politically meaningful at the time that it was noted by both Christian and Muslim chroniclers alike. Zamora was beset by Muslim forces led by the rebel mystic Ibn al-Qitt in 901, however they were shattered at its walls in what became known as the Day of Zamora. The counts of Castile subsequently seized and fortified a number of places south of the Esgueva and along the Douro, such as Roa, Clunia, Peñaranda, San Esteban de Gormaz and Osma. The successful defense of Zamora inspired Alfonso to march against Toledo, however the campaign was unsuccessful.

The internal struggles of Al-Andalus, the military successes of Asturias and the subsequent reinforcement of the authority of the Crown allowed Alfonso III to affirm his political hegemony. He hoped to restore the Gothic monarchy in all of Iberia still in his lifetime, and chroniclers described Alfonso as "about to reign" in all of the Iberian Peninsula, though this plan depended on the success of the rebellion of Ibn Hafsun against Cordoba and on the capture of several frontier strongholds, such as Mérida and Lisbon.

=== Partition of Asturias ===
Towards the end of his reign, Alfonso III suffered a numbere of difficulties to his rule, namely the revolt of his brother Bermudo in Astorga and various plots against his life or throne, including one in which his eldest son Garcia was implicated. Garcia was imprisoned on the castle of Gauzón, but this caused a wider revolt plotted between Garcias brothers and his father-in-law Nuno Fernandes, which led to Alfonsos forced abdication. Asturias was partitioned between Alfonsos three sons, with his eldest son Garcia becoming king of León, his second eldest Ordoño becoming king of Galicia and his third eldest Fruela inheriting Asturias proper, now cut-off from Muslim territory. With the permission of Garcia, Alfonso III still lead one last campaign against the Muslims a few months afterwards, and died at Zamora on December 20, 910 upon returning successfully from it.

Garcia died in 914 and Galicia was inherited by his brother Ordoño. When Ordoño died in 924, Fruela succeeded on both Galicia and León, thus reuniting under his rule the domains of his father, partitioned fourteen years prior. Nevertheless, he undertook no further campaigns against al-Andalus and only ruled for another fourteen months before dying of leprosy in 925. His son Alfonso Fróilaz briefly succeeded him, but the sons of Ordoño II, Sancho, Alfonso IV and Ramiro II revolted and drove him from the throne, which brought about a long period of civil war and the end of the participation of Asturias in the process of reconquest as an independent kingdom.

== See also ==
- History of Asturias
- Codex Vigilanus
- Reconquista
- Portugal in the Reconquista
- Crusades
- Repoblación
- Repoblación art and architecture
