= Hans Juhl =

German SS officer (1904–1970)

Hans Vilhelm Adolf Juhl, nicknamed Gestapo-Juhl (25 November 1904 - 6 February 1970), was a German SS-officer.

Juhl was an SS-Hauptscharführer (First Sergeant), kriminal oberassistent, and leader of the local Gestapo in the area around Helsingør (Elsinore) in Denmark from late summer 1943. He was born and raised in Schleswig-Holstein and spoke and understood Danish fairly well. He worked as a farmer outside of Flensburg before World War II and joined the Nazi party and SS shortly before the Nazi takeover of power in 1933. He arrived in Denmark shortly after the German occupation of Denmark in 1940.

In Helsingør Juhl and the local Gestapo moved into villa Wisborg, which became the center of activity of the local Gestapo. The basement was used for interrogation and as a jail. Juhl participated in the round-up of the Danish Jews in October 1943 and he was very actively involved in the capture of Danish Jews, who were trying to escape to Sweden. Gestapo Juhl was responsible for arresting about half of the 481 Danish Jews, who were deported to the Theresienstadt concentration camp, including the razzia on the attic in Gilleleje Church on the night between the 6th and 7 October 1943, where 85 people were arrested. Juhl was not convicted for his crimes after the war.
