= Second Battle of Cellorigo =

- Part of the Reconquista
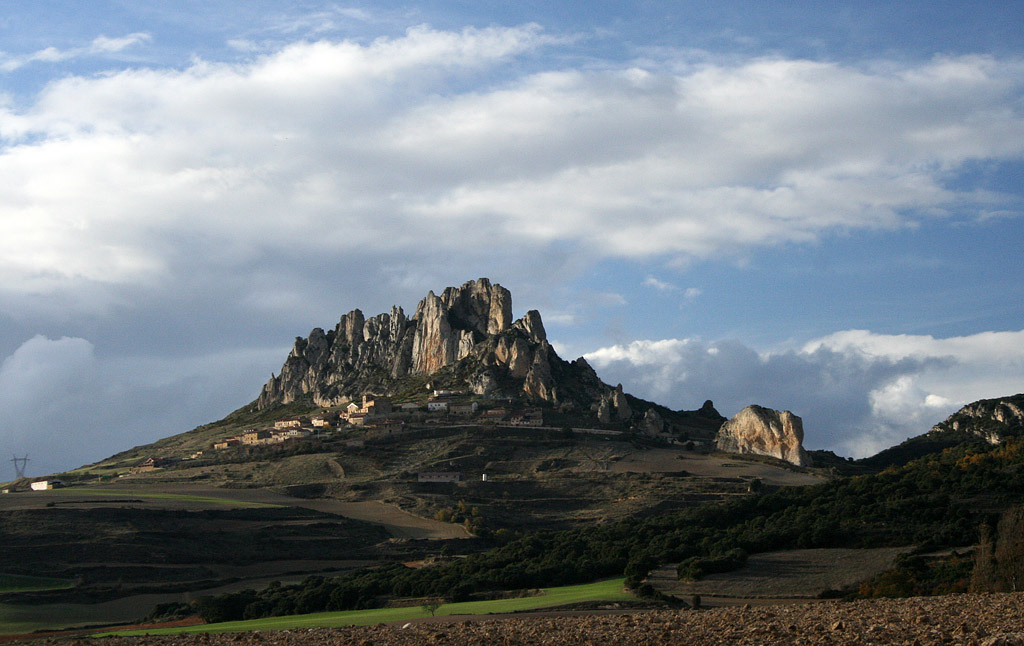
- Place in La Rioja where the Castle of Cellorigo was situated, guarding the mountain pass.
Date	883
Location	Cellorigo, La Rioja, Spain
Result	Asturian victory

Belligerents
Kingdom of Asturias	Emirate of Córdoba

Commanders and leaders
Alfonso III of Asturias; Diego Rodríguez Porcelos; Vela Jiménez	Al-Mundhir of Córdoba; Almonder; Abuhalit

The Second Battle of Cellorigo took place between the Emirate of Córdoba over the castle at Cellorigo and its surrounding countryside in 883 AD.

== Background ==
In 882 AD, at the First Battle of Cellorigo, the Banu Qasi ruler Muhammad ibn Lubb al-Qasawi and al-Mundhir of Córdoba, the son of the Cordoban emir Muhammad I of Córdoba, were repelled from the castle at Cellorigo by Vela Jiménez, count of the Asturian county of Álava.

A year later, in 883 AD, al-Mundhir gathered together an army under the command of generals Almonder and Abuhalit. After breaching the walls of Zaragoza and sacking the city of Villamayor de Monjardín and other towns of Navarre, he set off to take the mountain pass castle at Cellorigo.

== Battle ==
The results of the second campaign were worse than the previous attempt. After he was initially repulsed by the Cellorigo defenders, al-Mundhir attempted a second assault on the castle at Pancorbo and another at Castrojeriz. Both attempts were complete failures. Further, the attacks resulted in great loss of life for the Muslim side. Humiliated, al-Mundhir sent an envoy to King Alfonso III of Asturias to sue for peace.

== See also ==
- Asturias in the Reconquista

== Bibliography ==
- Llorente, Juan Antonio (1806). Noticias históricas de las tres Provincias Vascongadas. p. 69. "cellorigo vela."
- Real Academia de la Historia (1802). Diccionario geográfico-histórico de España.
