= Day of Zamora =

Battle during Spanish Reconquista

- Part of the Reconquista
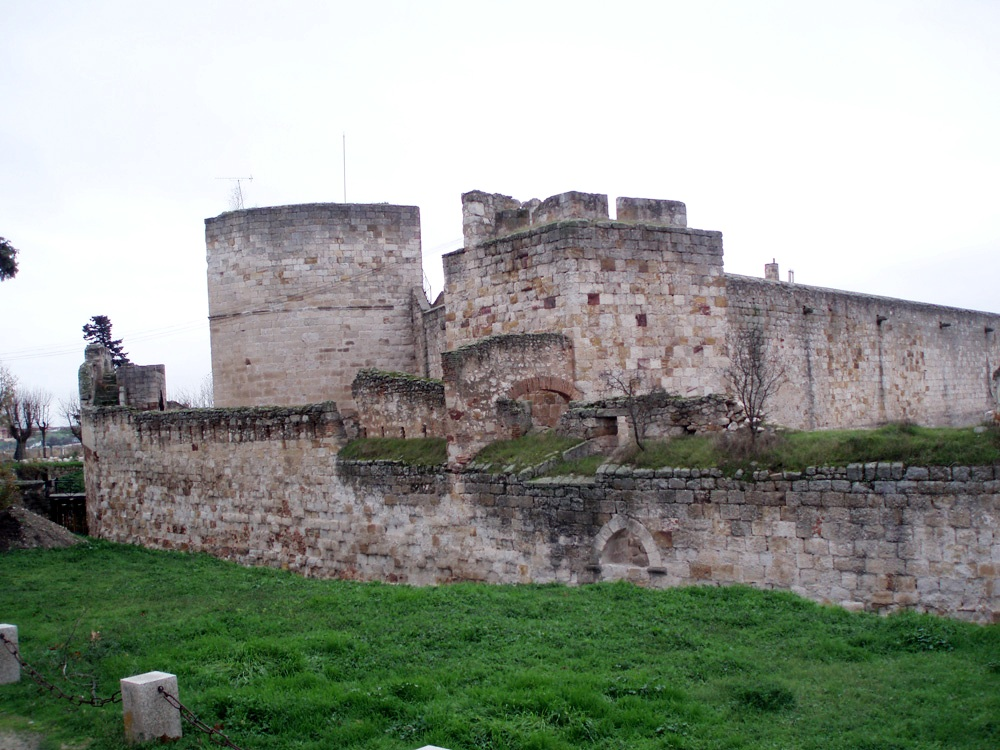
- The walls of and trenches at Zamora.
Date	July 901
Location	Zamora, Spain
Result	Asturian victory

Belligerents
Kingdom of Asturias	Emirate of Córdoba

Commanders and leaders
Alfonso III of Asturias	Ahmad bin Mu'awiya †

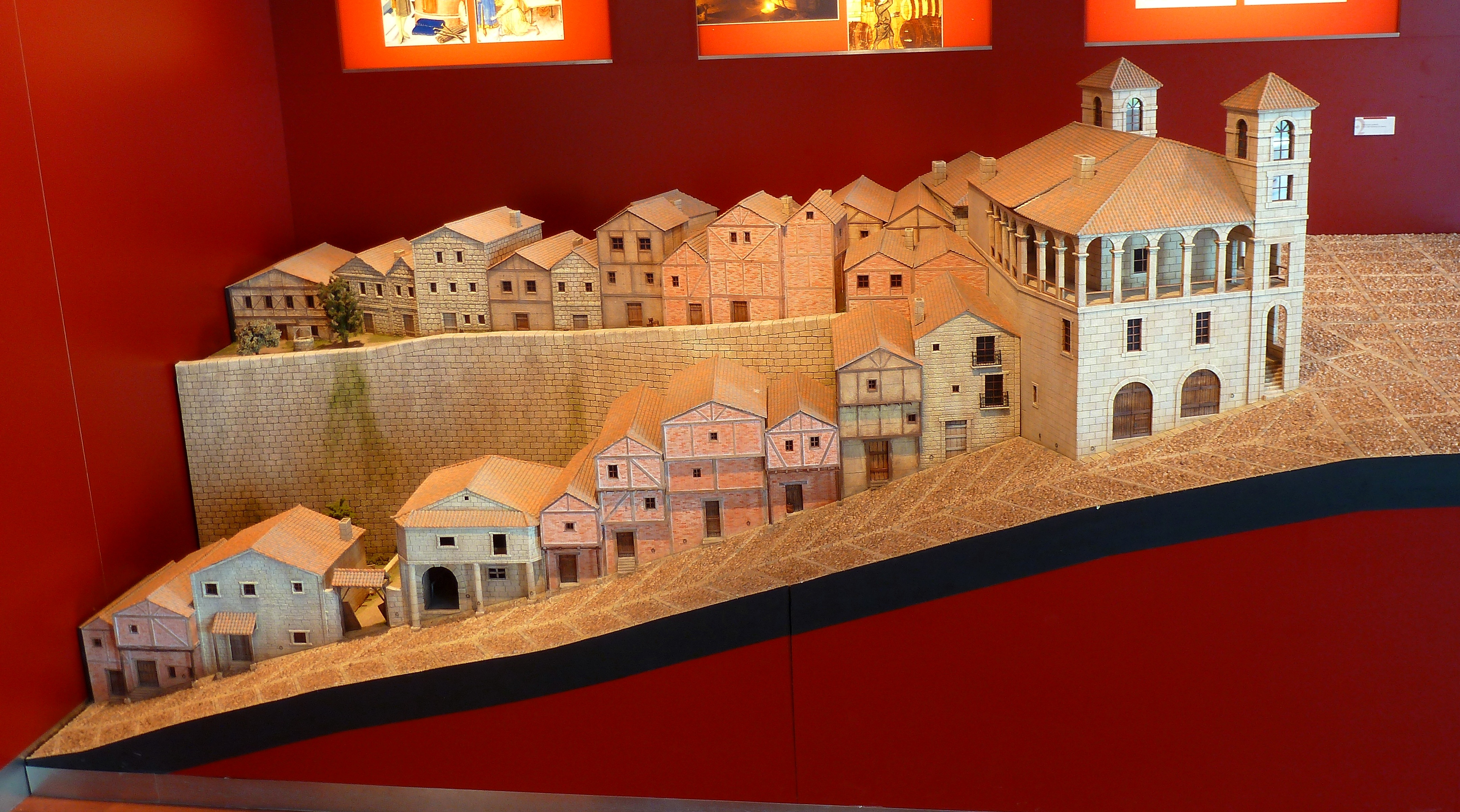
Model of Balborraz street, where the attackers' heads were displayed on pikes, in the Centre for the Interpretation of the Middle Ages Towns in Zamora, Spain.

The Day of Zamora (Spanish: Día de Zamora), also known as Jornada del Foso de Zamora ("Zamora's trench [moat] Day"), was a battle of the Spanish Reconquista that took place at the city of Zamora, Spain The battle was fought between the forces of the Kingdom of Asturias under the command of Alfonso III of Asturias and the Muslim forces of Ahmed Ibn Muwaiya, an Umayyad, who was also known as Ibn al-Qitt, and by his kunya: Abul Qassim. The battle ended in victory for the city's defenders.

== The battle ==
The troops of Ahmad Ibn Muawiya surrounded the city of Zamora in July of 901, quickly assaulting the renowned walls of the city. The battle lasted four days, finally resulting in victory for the city's Christian defenders.

The Arab chronicles of the time recounting the battle describe the amount of dead and injured as so great that it is referred to as the Jornada del Foso de Zamora, "Zamora's trench [moat] Day" or "Day of the trench [moat] of Zamora" (Not to be confused with the Battle of Alhandic 939, which bears the same nickname).

After the victory, the chronicles describe how the Asturian defenders severed the heads of Muslim leaders, including Ibn al-Qitt, and posted them on spikes on the battlements of the city walls for all to see. A portion of the wall south of the city's main cathedral lies next to a street called Calle Balborraz (named for an old gate exiting the city called the Puerta de Balborraz). This denomination originates from the Arab word bab al ras where bab means door and ras means head.

The Hispano-Muslim chroniclers of this battle include Ibn Hayyan, who followed the account written by Ahmad ibn Muhammad al-Razi. He attributes the attack to the Shia movement and says that Ibn al-Qitt was a "prophet".

== See also ==
- Battle of Alhandic - The battle of the same nickname which took place outside the city walls in 939 and resulted in Muslim victory.
- Zamora, Spain
- Alfonso III of Asturias
- Reconquista
  - Asturias in the Reconquista
