= Razzia (military) =

Rapid attack into enemy territory

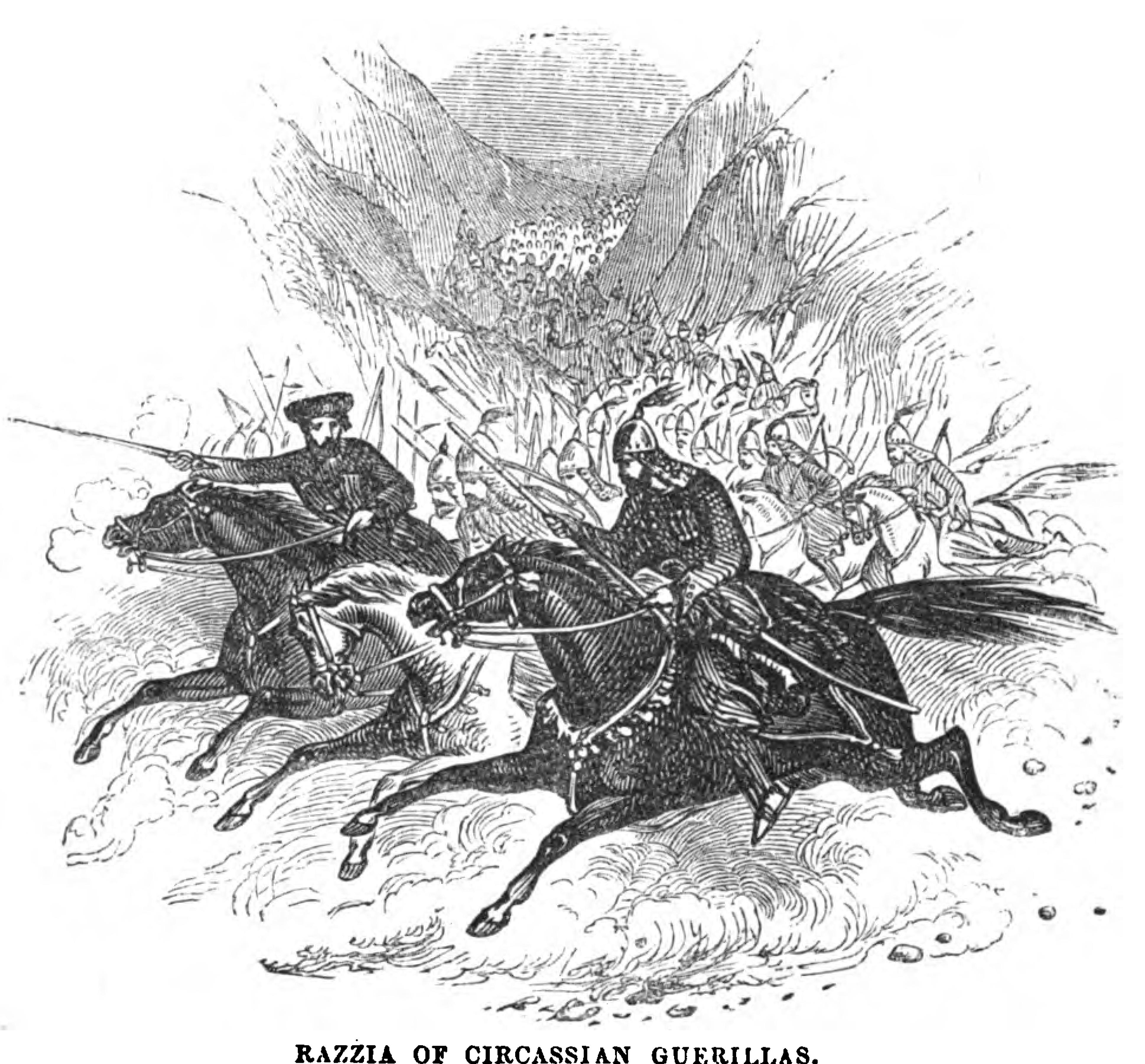
Razzia of Circassian guerillas (1855)

A razzia is a surprise raid against an enemy settlement. Although primarily aimed at obtaining booty, historically the objectives of a razzia have been diverse: the capture of slaves, religious or ethnic cleansing, expansion of territory, and intimidation of an enemy.

Over time, its meaning has also been extended to other activities that bear certain similarities to these attacks, such as police raids carried out in Brazilian favelas or certain violent incursions by organized or paramilitary groups, such as those carried out in refugee camps during the Second Congo War.

== Etymology ==
In Western European literature, razzia is derived from the French word razzier (rezzou), which entered the French vocabulary after the colonization of Algeria as a transliteration of the colloquial Arabic word ghazya.

== The aceifas ==
Military campaigns of Almanzor. In dark green, territories reconquered for Al-Andalus. The map shows the different aceifas of Almanzor and the dates on which they were carried out.

In the Iberian Peninsula, the Muslim razzias received the name of aceifas, from the Arabic al-ṣayfa: "Saracen war expedition that takes place in summer".

The Arabic name ṣayfa is etymologically related to ṣayf (summer) and initially meant "harvest", but over time it was also used to mean "military expedition" due to the "harvest" of goods from plundering and the fact that they used to be carried out in the summer.

The first important razzias against peninsular Christian territory began after the defeat of Bermudo I by Hisham I of the Emirate of Córdoba in the Battle of the Burbia River (791 CE), culminating in the sacking of the city of Oviedo in 794.

The Moorish aceifas were interrupted with the ascent to the Asturian throne of Alfonso II and the Christian victory in the Battle of Lutos, giving rise in response to a series of Christian razzias, including one carried out in 798 against Lisbon.

Internal strife in the Emirate of Córdoba interrupted the raids until the accession to the throne of Abd al-Rahman II. After putting an end to his uncle Abdallah's pretensions to the throne and putting down a revolt in Murcia, he organized annual aceifas against the Christians (at their most intense, up to three were organized in the same year). Most were directed against Alava and especially Galicia, which was the most vulnerable region of the Kingdom of Asturias. Despite this, there was no lack of attacks against Ausona (Vic), Barcelona, Girona and even Narbonne in the expeditions of the years 828, 840 and 850.

In the Maliki law there was a precept on how holy war was to be carried out:

The holy war must be carried out every year, with a sufficient military force, towards the most exposed side. It is a duty of solidarity (some contributing with their persons, others with their goods) that is imposed on every free, pubescent and valid man, even under the direction of an iniquitous leader.

— Fueros of the Cuenca-Teruel family

In the year 981 Hisham II delegated his powers to the warlord Almanzor, who fulfilled this precept with zeal by organizing up to five expeditions in Christian lands. By the time of his death in 1002, Almanzor had led up to 52 victorious military campaigns against the Christian kingdoms, of which the best known are the aceifas organized against Barcelona (985) and Santiago de Compostela (997), where according to legend he made Christian slaves carry the bells of the cathedral to Córdoba. A large number of Christian monasteries such as San Millán de Suso, Portuguese cities, and the capitals of the Christian kingdoms of Pamplona and León, which he sacked up to four times, were not spared either.

During the Almoravid and Almohad domination, aceifas were directed both against Christian and Muslim territories. The Almoravids raided all of North Africa, reaching as far as Ghana. The fanaticism of these new invaders caused some Taifa kings to ally with the Christian kings of the north, having also become targets of the summer aceifas.

The last important aceifas in peninsular territory would take place in 1198 against Madrid and in 1199 against Guadalajara. The Battle of Las Navas de Tolosa (1212) would definitively ruin Almohad military power, and Al-Andalus would never again go on the offensive.

== Raiders: the "ghazi" ==
Ghazi (Arabic: غازى) is an Arabic word in origin, derived from ghazā (contraction for *ghazawa) = "raided" or "waged war", adopted into other languages such as Turkish to designate those Muslims who have sworn to fight non-believers in the Islamic religion. In this sense, it is essentially equivalent to mujahid: "one who wages jihad", commonly known as "holy war".

Al-Mansur (977-1002) established a military dictatorship based on warlike successes, that were acquiring contents of holy war against the Christians. He developed a policy of military actions against the Christian kingdoms, more than 50 razzias, in which, in addition to economic resources, they sought to punish the infidels and to strengthen their own prestige. The destruction of Barcelona (985 AD) and Santiago (997 AD) were the most devastating.

— Historia, Crisol ed.Vicens Vives p.28

For the ghāzīs on their marches, it was a religious duty to raze the countries of the infidels who resisted Islam, and force them into submission.

— Cambridge. Historia del Islam (in Spanish), p. 283

Once the conquest was over, the legal scholars established that the Caliph should organize expeditions into enemy territory at least once a year to keep the spirit of jihad alive.

— Peters, La Yihad en el Islam Clásico y Moderno: Antología, p. 3

The ghāzī warrior dates back to at least Pre-Islamic Arabia, when he appears as anything from an ideological warrior, such as amongst the forces of Al-Nu'man III ibn al-Mundhir, to mercenaries who specialized in plundering Byzantine, Sassanian, and Southern Arabian settlements.

Following the Islamic Conquest of Persia, Bedouin razzia tactics were copied by the Persians. Subsequently, as many as 20,000 ghāzī took part in the Indian campaigns of Mahmud of Gazni.

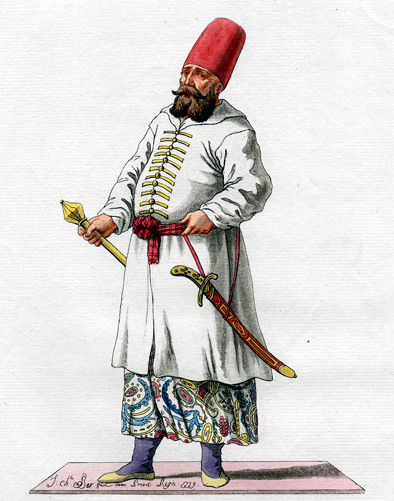
Mamluk warrior

The ghāzī way of life was based on plunder, so in times of peace they engaged in banditry and sedition. They were organized into guilds that attracted adventurers, zealots, and political and religious dissidents of all ethnicities. Soldiers of Turkish descent predominated, especially after the acquisition of Mamluks, Turkish slaves, and guard corps of the caliphs and emirs for the ghāzī ranks. Some of them would climb to control positions of military and eventually political power in various Muslim states.

In the west, Turkish ghāzīs regularly raided along the Byzantine frontier, finding in the Greek and Armenian akritoi their nemeses. After the Battle of Manzikert, these raids intensified, while the ghāzī guilds grouped together to form fraternities similar to Christian military orders. They adopted as their emblems the white cap and the club. The rise of the ghāzī organizations occurred during the Mongol conquest, as a result of which many fled to Anatolia from Persia and Turkestan.

The organization of these groups was fluid, reflecting their popular character. Ghāzī warriors could rise in the hierarchy by gaining prestige with a particular emir, similar to the condottieri of Italian mercenary bands. From the territory conquered in Anatolia during the ghazw emerged the Ottoman Empire. Tradition has it that its founder, Osman I, was a ghāzī who was inspired by sheikh Ede Bali.

In a later period of Islamic history, the honorific title ghāzī was adopted by those Muslim leaders who showed some success in extending the frontiers of Islam. Eventually this title became exclusive, similar to how the Roman title ''imperator'' became the exclusive property of the supreme leader of the Roman state and his family.

The Ottomans were probably the first in this practice, so the institution of ghazw dates back to the beginnings of their state.

By the beginning of Ottoman rule, it had become a title of honor and synonymous with leadership. In a 1337 inscription (concerning the construction of the Bursa mosque), Orhan, second in the Ottoman dynasty, is described as "Sultan, son of the Sultan of the Gazis, Gazi son of Gazi, martial lord of the horizons." The Ottoman poet Ahmedi, circa 1402, defines a gazi as:

Instrument of the religion of God, a servant of God who cleanses the earth of polytheistic filth, the sword of God.

— Lewis, ''Lenguaje Político del Islam'', págs. 147-148, nota 8

The first nine Ottoman leaders used the word "ghazi" as part of their title, and often their successors. It never became a formal title, unlike Sultan ul-Muyahidin, used by Sultan Murad Khan II Khojā Ghazi, sixth ruler of the House of Osman (1421-1451), whose full title was 'Abu'l Hayrat, Sultan ul-Muyahidin, Khan of Khans, Grand Sultan of Anatolia and Rumelia, and of the cities of Adrianople and Philippopolis.

As a result of the political legitimacy granted to the one holding this title, Muslim leaders competed with each other for preeminence in the ghāziya. Generally, the Ottoman sultans were recognized for their excellence over the rest:

The term Ghazi was also used as an honorific title, usually translated as "the Victorious", by high-ranking officers, who distinguished themselves in the field against non-Muslim enemies; thus, it was awarded to General Osman Pasha after his successful defense of Plevna in Bulgaria. It was also assigned to Mustafa Kemal Ataturk, despite the fact that he was a secular politician.

Two Muslim leaders from Afghanistan and Hyderabad personally used the title Padshah-i-Ghazi.

== Mode of execution of the razzias ==
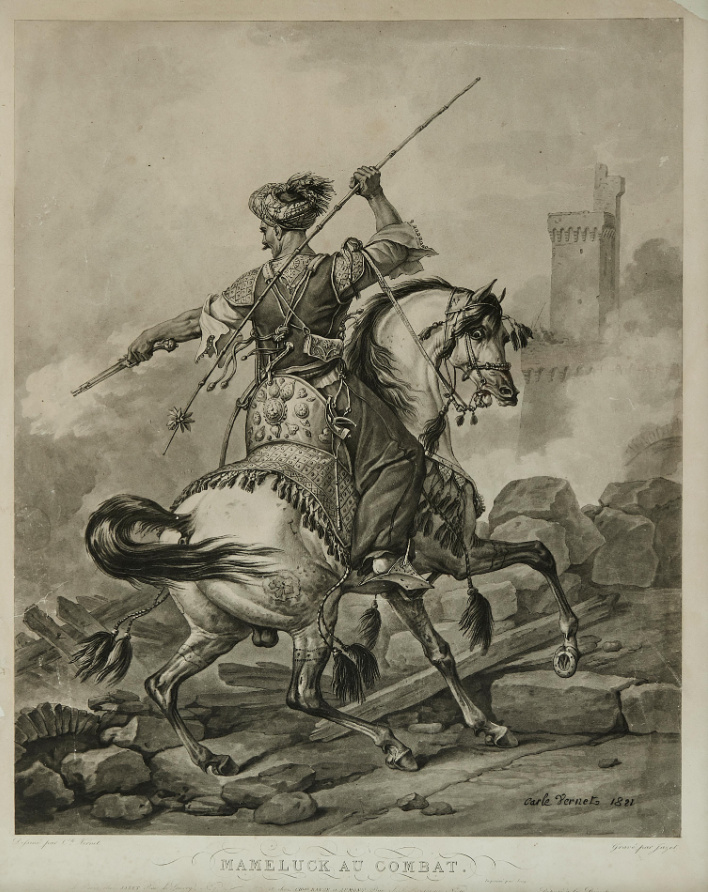
Mamluk soldier on horseback (1810)

When executed in the context of Islamic jihad, the function of the razzia was to weaken the enemy's defenses in preparation for his eventual conquest and subjugation. Since the typical razzia was not large enough to achieve military or territorial objectives, it usually involved surprise attacks on poorly defended targets (e.g. villages) with the intention of terrorizing and demoralizing their inhabitants and destroying supplies that might supply the enemy. Islamic rules clearly defined who should go to war and who was exempted from such responsibility:

Are exempted from making the holy war the sick, impuberal, insane, blind and lame, women, individuals without sufficient resources required by the needs of war (weapons, mounts, supplies, etc.), slaves, debtors and, finally, those to whom the father and mother (or one of them) refuse permission to go; but the prohibition of a grandfather is not sufficient to prevent the departure. The paternal refusal prevents, likewise, a maritime or dangerous voyage (for commercial purposes), and when the prohibition emanates from an infidel father it must be respected as if it came from a faithful, if it is other than holy war.

Although the rules of Islamic warfare forbade taking the lives of non-combatants such as women, monastics and serfs, it was possible to plunder or destroy property that they did not depend on for subsistence if they did not accept either converting to Islam, or paying the Jizya tax.

The infidels will be invited to embrace Islam, but if after three days the infidels do not accept it, they will be ordered to pay the legal capitulation (yizya); in case they refuse, then they are to be fought and may be annihilated, except women (unless they have participated in the fight against the Muslims), children, the mentally weak, the old, the physically handicapped, the blind and monks who live retired in convents or hermitages. All those whom the law orders to be pardoned shall be left, from what they possess, what is necessary for subsistence.

In the country of infidels the imam can apply the penalties determined by the law (hadd) 33. One can destroy the dwellings, cut and burn the palms (trees), if that causes harm to the infidels or there is no hope of remaining as owner. Destruction, according to Ibn Rusd, is then recommended, as it is recommended to abstain if the hope of remaining exists.

== The Maghāzī razzias in literature ==
Maghāzī, literally meaning "campaigns", is a term often used in Islamic literature to represent the military campaigns conducted by Muhammad following the Hijrah. The annals of these campaigns, often reflected as preemptive measures or attacks against invaders, which entailed the traditional plunder, constitute their own genre of prophetic biography within Islamic literature, distinctive of this era. A famous example of this genre is al-Waqidi's Maghāzī.

== Contemporary uses ==
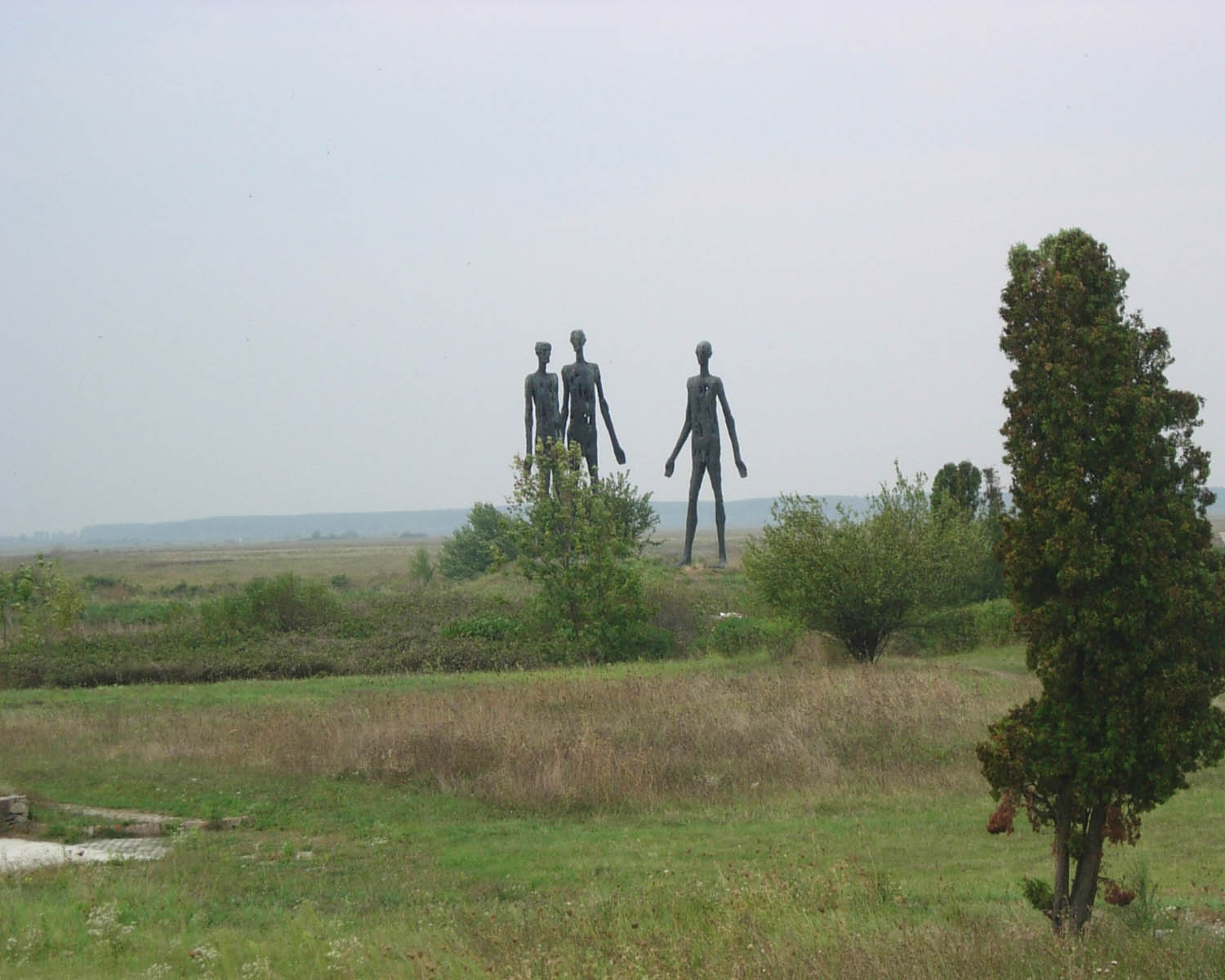
Monument to the victims of the German razzia of 1942 in Žabalj, Serbia.

=== World War II ===
Some of these well-known razzias are Night of Broken Glass, carried out by the Gestapo in Germany, or The SS raid on the Yugoslav city of Žabalj (present-day Serbia).

=== Chechnya ===
During the Second Chechen War, Chechnya announced the gazawat against Russia, as a propaganda measure and to gain the support of the Islamic population, the majority in the country.

=== Other examples ===
Other examples of current razzias are the death squad raids in the Brazilian favelas, or the paramilitary incursions during the Second Congo War in Central Africa. The multiple attacks by Colombian guerrilla groups on Colombian army squads and vice versa could also be considered as such.

== See also ==
- Malón

== Bibliography ==
1. RoyalArk- Ottoman Turkey
2. "Ghazw". Encyclopedia of Islam (CD-ROM v. 1.0 ed.). 1999.
3. "Ghāzī". Encyclopedia of Islam (CD-ROM v. 1.0 ed.). 1999.
4. Lewis, Bernard (1991). The Political Language of Islam. University of Chicago Press. p. 74. ISBN 0-226-47693-6.
5. Firestone, Reuven (1999). Jihad: The Origins of Holy War in Islam. Oxford University Press. p. 34. ISBN 0-19-512580-0.
6. Peters, Rudolph (1996). Jihad in Classical and Modern Islam: A Reader. Markus Wiener Publishers. ISBN 1-55876-109-8.
7. Averroes, Bida-yat al-Mujtahid wa-Niha-yat al-Muqtasid
8. Wittek, Paul (2002). The Rise of the Ottoman Empire. Translated by Heywood, Colin. Curzon Press. ISBN 0-7007-1500-2.
9. Holt, Peter M. (1970). The Cambridge History of Islam. Vol. 1, The Central Islamic Lands. Cambridge University Press. ISBN 0-521-07567-X.
10. Robinson, Chase (2002). Islamic Historiography. Cambridge University Press. ISBN 0-521-62936-5.
11. Melo, Diego (2005). "El concepto Yihad en el islam clásico y sus etapas de aplicación". Temas Medievales (in Spanish). 13. Temas Mediev.: 157–172. ISSN 0327-5094.
12. Cañada Juste, A. (1993). "Nuevas propuestas para la identificación de topónimos e itinerarios en las campañas de Almanzor". Anaquel de estudios árabes (4): 25–36. ISSN 1130-3964.
