= Battle of Río Quirós =

Battle of Rio Quirós
- Part of the Reconquista
- Iberian Peninsula c. 814
Date	September 795
Location	Quirós, Asturias, Spain
Result	Umayyad victory

Belligerents
Kingdom of Asturias	Emirate of Córdoba

Commanders and leaders
Alfonso II of Asturias; Gadaxara †	Abd al-Karim ibn Abd al-Walid ibn Mugaith

Strength
3,000 cavalry	Many

Casualties and losses
Heavy	Unknown

The Battle of Río Quirós occurred after the Battle of Las Babias in which the Asturians attempted to stop the Umayyad attack. The battle was an Umayyad victory.

On September 18, 795, The Umayyads defeated the Asturians at Las Babias. They chose to follow up with their victory and give no quarter to the Asturians. The Asturian king, Alfsonso II, decided to gather his troops at Quirós, regroup them, and return to face the Muslims on more advantageous land. The Umayyad general, Abdul Karim, gave him no time to organize his forces who wished to avenge his brother's death at Lutos. He arrived in Quirós before Alfonso could be ready. Alfonso saw the upcoming Umayyads, and he decided to send the majority of his cavalry to stop them, numbering around 3,000 cavalry.

The Cavalry force was led by a man called Gadaxara. A certain brave man in the King's inner circle. The King ordered him to stand his ground between the king and Abdul Karim. Alfonso did not escape to Oviedo, instead, he remained on the other side of the river to intervene in the battle if circumstances required. The battle began and it was undoubtedly fierce. The Muslim troops were more numerous. Although the terrain was not suitable for cavalry charges, the Umayyads, with numerical numbers, won the battle. The Asturians were defeated and Gadaxara was taken prisoner, but it is most likely he was killed. Alfonso had to retreat again.

== See also ==
- Battle of Las Babias
- Battle of Lutos
- Asturias in the Reconquista

== Sources ==
- José Javier Esparza (2009), La gran aventura del reino de Asturias, Así comenzó la Reconquista.
- Fortunato de Selgas (1908), Monumentos ovetenses del Siglo IX.
