= Battle of Alhandic =

Battle of the Reconquista (939 AD)

- Part of the Reconquista
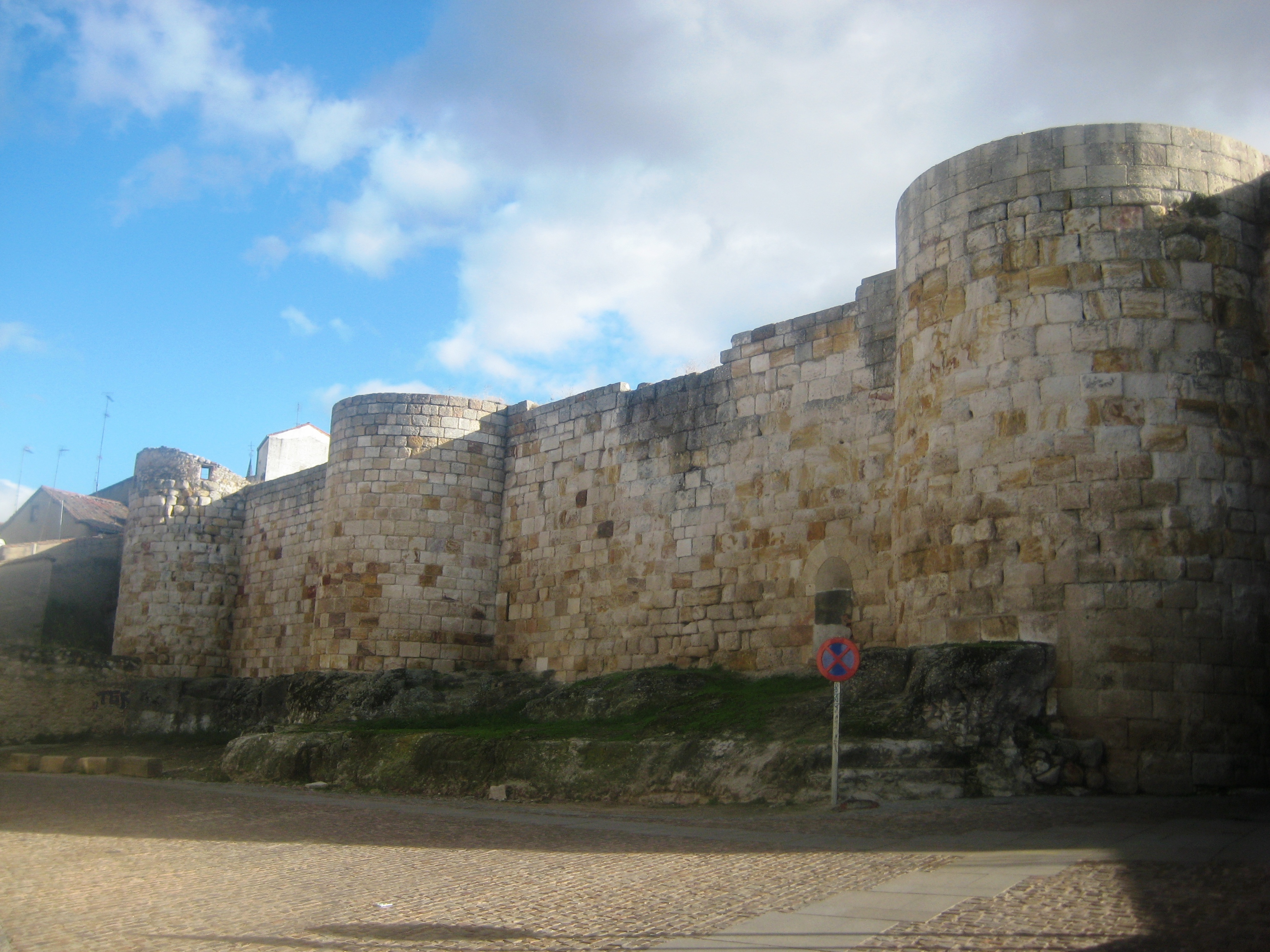
- The walls of Zamora.
Date	5 August 939
Location	Zamora, Kingdom of León 41°29′58″N 5°45′22″W
Result	Córdoban victory

Belligerents
Kingdom of León	Caliphate of Córdoba

Commanders and leaders
Ramiro II of León	Abd al-Rahman III
- Location of Zamora Zamora (Europe)

The Battle of Alhandic (Spanish: Batalla de Alhandic), also known as Battle of Zamora's moat (Batalla del Foso de Zamora), occurred on 5 August 939 in the city of Zamora, Spain. The battle occurred when the troops of the Caliph of Córdoba, Abd al-Rahman III assaulted the walls of Zamora. The defending troops were those loyal to Ramiro II, King of León. The fighting was so bloody that the tide of the battle did not turn until the moat surrounding the city walls was entirely filled with corpses. The troops of Abd al-Rahman won the day and were able to seize the city of Zamora.

This battle should not be confused with the Day of Zamora (Día de Zamora or Jornada del Foso de Zamora) which took place a few decades before in the year 901.

== History ==
Once Abd al-Rahman came to power, he was quick to assert his power and made it his goal to finish the rebels in Al-Andalus. He wanted to consolidate his power base and reestablish the internal order of the Emirate of Córdoba. He decided to go to the border and attack the cities that acted as a protective buffer against the Asturian / Leonese lands to the north. It was on this defensive line that he came upon Zamora. The city was strategically important because it was squarely in the path of march typically used by the Leonese troops. Abd al-Rahman attacked the city on 5 August 939. His strategy was to fill the moat around the city with bodies and debris so that his men could more easily climb the parapets and thus engage the defending soldiers directly. This bloodthirsty strategy lends its name to the battle which is sometimes known as the Batalla del Foso de Zamora (Battle of Zamora's moat).

The final result was a victory for the troops of Abd al-Rahman who sacked the city of Zamora.

== See also ==
- Day of Zamora – Celebrates the battle which took place outside the city walls in 901.
- Zamora, Spain
- Ramiro II of León
- Battle of Simancas
