= Battle of Las Babias =

Historic battle on the Iberian peninsula

Coordinates: 43.3333°N 6.4167°W

- Part of Razias of Hirsham I the Reconquista
- Iberian Peninsula c. 814
Date	18 September 795
Location	Babia, near Astorga, Spain
Result	Muslim victory

Belligerents
Kingdom of Asturias	Emirate of Córdoba

Commanders and leaders
Alfonso II of Asturias	Hisham I of Córdoba; Abd al-Karim ibn Abd al-Wahid ibn Mugit; Farach ibn Kinanah

Strength
Unknown	10,000

Casualties and losses
Unknown	Unknown

The Battle of Las Babias occurred in the year 795 when the Emir of Cordoba, Hisham I of Córdoba sought to avenge his previous military incursions in 794 against the Kingdom of Asturias under the command of the brothers Abd al-Karim ibn Abd al-Walid ibn Mugaith and Abd al-Malik ibn Abd al-Walid ibn Mugaith. The previous battles resulted in devastating losses for the Emirate, most importantly at the Battle of Lutos where one of the Emir's generals was killed in action. The battle resulted in a Córdoban victory.

== Background ==
The Córdoban Emir, Hirsham I sought revenge for the defeat of his army in 794 at the Battle of Lutos in which the Córdoban general Abd al-Malik ibn Abd al-Walid ibn Mugaith was killed in action. (Note: Abu al-Walid Hisham al-Rida (Hixem I in the old Spanish transcription; 26 de abril de 757 - 12 de junio de 796).) To achieve this end, he sent his brother, Abd al-Karim ibn Abd al-Walid ibn Mugaith at the head of an army of 10,000 men under arms against the Kingdom of Asturias.

The Emir also organized another army which marched against the Kingdom of Galicia to divert any potential conversion of Christian forces on his brother's army in Asturias. This second column entered Galicia and proceeded to lay waste to the land. Upon its withdrawal, it came into a separate engagement with Galician and Asturian forces and was routed. In this action, the Muslims suffered heavy losses and forces captured, but managed to escape eventually.

King Alfonso II of Asturias, who had reinforced his army with local machus (Note: Basque idolaters) made his camp near Astorga. The area had been a base of operations for Muslim attacks against Asturias via the Puerto de Mesa. From there, the Asturian king sent the local inhabitants into the surrounding mountains and waited for the Córdoban forces to engage him. The location was favourable in that his line of retreat was guaranteed via the Puerto de Ventana.

== Battle ==
Abd al-Karim sent his vanguard of 4,000 men against Alfonso II's main force under the command of Farach ibn Kinanah, the commander of the Sidoniyya Division. Abd al-Karim ibn Abd al-Walid ibn Mugaith, himself advanced shortly afterwards with the rearguard and reserves and their combined forces managed to successfully rout the Asturians. As planned, the Asturians retreated via Puerto de Ventana while fighting a rearguard action against pursuing Córdoban cavalry.

== Aftermath ==
Abd al-Karim ibn Abd al-Walid ibn Mugaith and Farach ibn Kinanah proceeded to then defeat the forces of the Kingdom of Asturias at the Battle of Río Quirós, again at the Battle of Río Nalón, and culminating in the Capture of Oviedo. (Note: At Quirós, the famed Asturian magnate and knight Gadaxara was defeated along with his force of 3,000 men. Gadaxara himself was captured) With the onset of winter, the Córdoban forces retreated to their lands without dealing a finishing blow to the Kingdom of Asturias. The Asturian king Alfonso II was able to escape with his army.

The death of Hisham I of Córdoba and the subsequent disputes between his heirs ensured that the Kingdom of Asturias could recover from the series of defeats in the course of a few years. The time allowed for Alfonso II of Asturias to cement an alliance with Charlemagne, King of the Franks.

== Bibliography ==
- Cabal, Constantino, Benito Ruano, Eloy., pr.:Alfonso II El Casto, fundador de Oviedo. Grupo Editorial Asturiano. 1991. ISBN 84-404-8512-3
- Asturianos universales 7 : Alfonso II, el Casto, Félix de Aramburu y Zuloaga, Alfonso I, José Posada Herrera, Ramón Menéndez Pidal. Ediciones Páramo, S.A. 1996. ISBN 84-87253-26-1
- Códice testamento Alfonso II el Casto y estudio de la obra. Ediciones Madú 2 v ISBN 84-95998-72-6
- Lewis, David Levering (2009) [2008]. El Crisol de Dios. El Islam y el nacimiento de Europa (570-1215). Barcelona: Editorial Paidós, ISBN 978-84-493-2233-4.
- Gebhardt, Víctor (1864). Historia general de España y de sus Indias desde los tiempos más remotos hasta nuestros días: tomada de las principales historias, crónicas y anales que acerca de los sucesos ocurridos en nuestra patria se han escrito (in Spanish). Madrid: Librería Española. "Tomo II"
- Torrente, Mariano (1827). Geografía universal física, política é histórica (in Spanish). Madrid: Imprenta de Don Miguel de Burgos. "Tomo I"
