= First Battle of Cellorigo =

Cellorigo's First Battle on 882

- Part of the Reconquista
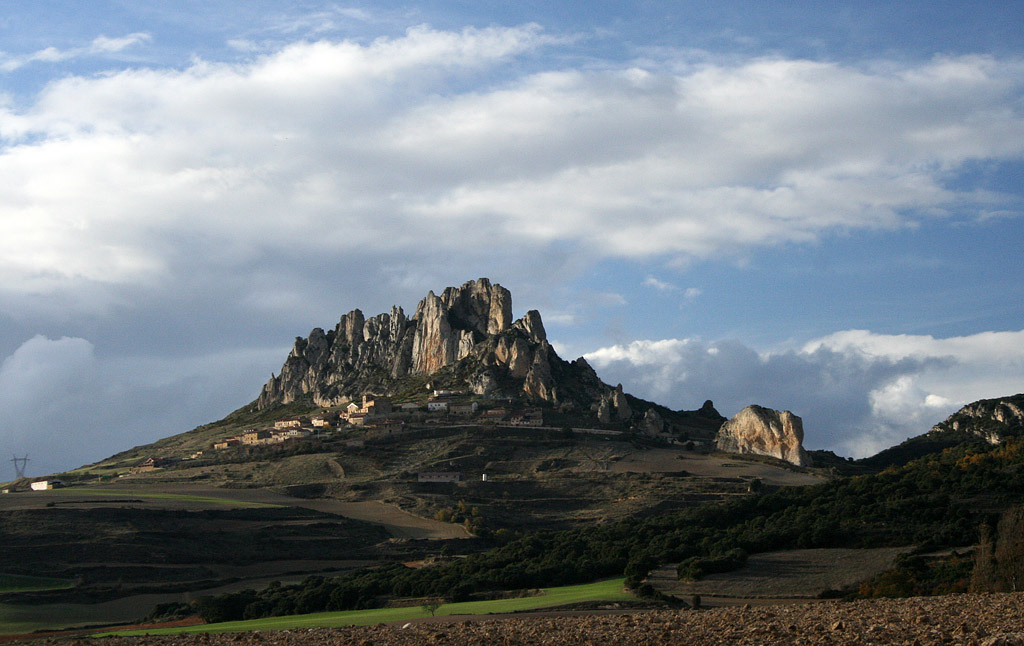
- Place in La Rioja where the Castle of Cellorigo was situated, guarding the mountain pass.
Date	882
Location	Cellorigo, La Rioja, Spain
Result	Asturian victory

Belligerents
Kingdom of Asturias	Emirate of Córdoba

Commanders and leaders
Alfonso III of Asturias; Diego Rodríguez Porcelos; Vela Jiménez	Muhammad ibn Lubb al-Qasawi; Al-Mundhir of Córdoba

The First Battle of Cellorigo took place between the Kingdom of Asturias and the Emirate of Córdoba over the castle at Cellorigo and its surrounding countryside in 882.

== Background ==
In 882 the Banu Qasi ruler Muhammad ibn Lubb al-Qasawi who, like his father Lubb ibn Musa before him, had previously had good relations with the Christian kingdoms to his north, joined in a coalition with the forces of the Cordoban emir Muhammad I of Córdoba. The emir, as a gesture of good will, sent his son al-Mundhir of Córdoba to join ibn Lubb on raids along the Ebro. Ibn Lubb made his way from Zaragoza along the Ebro and devastated the valleys he passed through in La Rioja, which at the time belonged to the king of Zaragoza, Isma'el ibn Musa, and the King of Tudela, Navarre, Fortun ibn Musa, both of whom were uncles of ibn Lubb.

== Battle ==
On their arrival at Cellorigo, ibn Lubb and al-Mundhir attempted to take the castle, as it was strategically positioned to protect one of the few passes crossing the Obarenes Mountains. The castle was defended by Vela Jiménez, count of the Asturian county of Álava. The attack left both armies with many wounded and the Muslim forces were unable to succeed in taking the castle. Afterwards, al-Mundir took a sizable portion of the Muslim army and went to Pancorbo, another mountain pass through the Obarenes. The assault on the castle became prolonged over a number of days, finishing with another Muslim retreat and many casualties.

After these retreats, king Alfonso III of Asturias ordered Jiménez and the Castilian count Diego Rodríguez Porcelos to pursue ibn Lubb and al-Mundhir. After being pursued for some time, the Muslim leaders sued for peace.

== See also ==
- Second Battle of Cellorigo
- Asturias in the Reconquista

== Bibliography ==
- Llorente, Juan Antonio (1806). Noticias históricas de las tres Provincias Vascongadas. p. 69. "cellorigo vela."
- Real Academia de la Historia (1802). Diccionario geográfico-histórico de España.
