= Vela Jiménez =

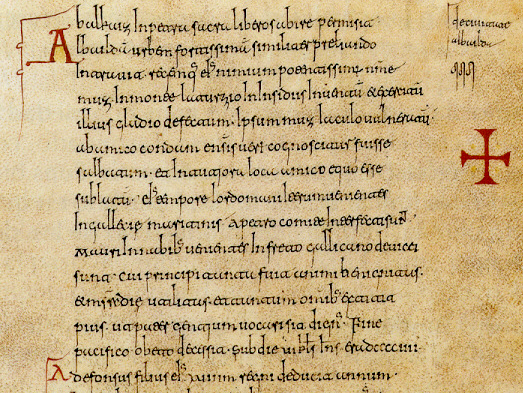
Folio 241 of the Codex Vigilanus (9th century)

Vela Jiménez who appears also as Vigila Scemeniz, is documented on two occasions as Count of Álava between 882 and 883 in the Codex Vigilanus, compiled in 881 with two large paragraphs added subsequently describing the events that took place in 882 and 883.

There is a previous reference to another count in Álava called Eylo who in 868 led a rebellion that was quashed by King Alfonso III of Asturias and then taken to Oviedo in chains. Nevertheless, the references to Count Vela, the head of this lineage, are much more precise.

== Family origins ==
He is assumed to have been a member of the royal house of Pamplona and a member of the Jiména dynasty and a relative of King Alfonso III and perhaps his brother-in-law. This placement is based solely on his common patronymic, and there is no documentary evidence whatsoever to support such relationships.

== Count in Álava ==
The first count of Castile was Rodrigo who governed the County of Castile by mandate of King Ordoño I of Asturias and, according to documentary sources, it seems that the authority of this Castilian count and later that of his son Diego included parts of Álava, although it was not until 882 when someone held that title.

By 882, the county was being governed by Rodrigo's son, Diego, while Vela Jiménez appears in 882 and in 883 in charge of the government of Álava:Vigila Scemeniz erat tunc comes in Alaba. In 882, while Count Diego defended the gorge at Pancorbo, Count Vela was responsible for defending the County of Álava from the castle at Cellorigo, from where he blocked the passage and defeated the Muslim forces led by Al-Mundhir of Córdoba at the Battle of Cellorigo.

== Possible descendants ==
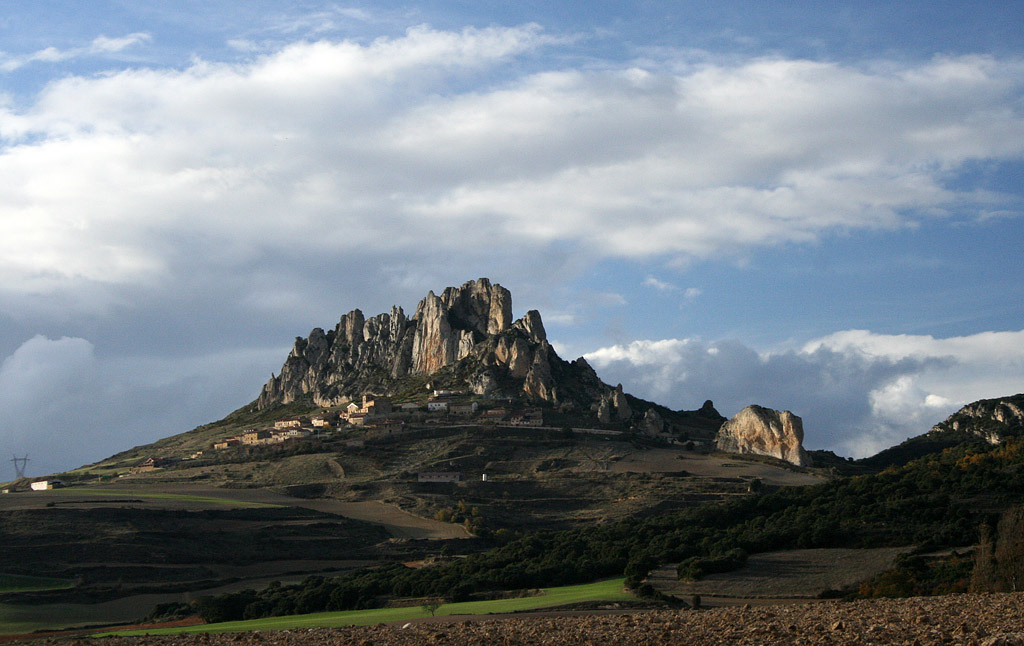
Place in La Rioja, former site of the Castle of Cellorigo

Although there is no document to confirm it, he is assumed to have been the father of:

- Munio Vélaz, who appears from 913 as the count in Álava and in 919 as Monnio Uigilazi in Alaba in the Cartularios de Valpuesta. Because of his patronymic and his title, he was probably one of Count Vela's sons. He could also have been same Munio who appears in the Códice de Roda as Count Momo Biscahiensis, that is, count in Biscay.
- Nuño Vélaz. The medieval scholar Jaime de Salazar y Acha suggests that Count Vela could have been the father of a son named Nuño who settled in the Kingdom of León after the descendants of Count Vela Jimenez fled from Castile due to their differences with the Castilian count Fernán González, and became ancestor of the Vela (or Vélaz) family. According to the author, this would explain the Basque names such as Vela and Oveco in subsequent generations. This Nuño would have been the father of several children, including counts Vela Núñez, Bermudo Núñez, the first count of Cea, and Oveco Núñez, Bishop of León.

== Bibliography ==
- Martín Duque, Ángel J. (2002). "Vasconia en la alta edad media: somera aproximación histórica". Príncipe de Viana (in Spanish) (227): 871–908. ISSN 0032-8472.
- Martínez Díez, Gonzalo (2004). El Condado de Castilla (711-1038). La historia frente a la leyenda (in Spanish). Valladolid: Junta de Castilla y León. ISBN 84-9718-275-8.
- Salazar y Acha, Jaime de (1985). "Una Familia de la Alta Edad Media: Los Velas y su Realidad Histórica". Estudios Genealógicos y Heráldicos (in Spanish). Madrid: Asociación Española de Estudios Genealógicos y Heráldicos. ISBN 84-398-3591-4.
