= Capture of Oviedo =

Capture of Oviedo (795)
- Part of the Reconquista
- Iberian Peninsula c. 814
Date	September 795
Location	Quirós, Asturias, Spain
Result	Umayyad victory

Belligerents
Kingdom of Asturias	Emirate of Córdoba

Commanders and leaders
Alfonso II of Asturias	Abd al-Karim ibn Abd al-Walid ibn Mugaith; Faraj ibn Kinanah

Strength
Unknown	10,000 men

Casualties and losses
9000 - 10,000 Killed	Unknown

In 795, the Umayyads, led by Abdul Karim, attacked the capital of the Kingdom of Asturias, successfully capturing and sacking it. They failed, however, to capture the Asturian king.

After the Umayyad victory at Battle of Río Quirós, the Asturian king, Alfonso II, retreated again, he went to Nalón River where there was a fortress built to prevent any attack against the capital, Oviedo. The Umayyad general, Abdul Karim, continued his victorious march. The Umayyads arrived at the Nalón fortress where they successfully captured it. They looted many provisions and precious things which the Asturian king did not have time to collect. However, the Umayyads still did not find Alfonso in the fort. Alfonso retreated to his capital.

Night fell and the pursuit of the king stopped where they rested for one day. The next day, Abdul Karim ordered his general, Faraj ibn Kinanah, to assault Oviedo with a body of 10,000 men. The repairing of the walls was not sufficient to repel the attack of the Muslims, therefore, Alfonso again abandoned his place to the Muslims. The Umayyads assaulted the city and began sacking it. They entered the palace of the king and looted the treasures there. The Oviedo Cathedral was destroyed as well. Once again, the Umayyads did not find their main target. The Umayyad decided to give up on their campaign as winter was approaching and were already satisfied with the loot they captured.

Alfonso would later rebuild Oviedo into fortified residential city.

== Sources ==
- José Javier Esparza (2009), La gran aventura del reino de Asturias, Así comenzó la Reconquista.
- Fortunato de Selgas (1908), Monumentos ovetenses del Siglo IX.

https://archive.org/details/elshandawily0669/page/n1/mode/1up?q=%D8%A7%D9%84%D8%AD%D9%83%D9%85 Page 216
