= Battle of the Burbia River =

Battle between the Kingdom of Asturias and the Emirate of Córdoba in 791

Coordinates: 42.7167°N 6.6500°W

Battle of Río Burbia
- Part of the Reconquista
- Division of the Iberian Peninsula between the Emirate of Córdoba, the Kingdom of Asturias and the Carolingian Empire in 814.
Date	791
Location	Villafranca del Bierzo, Castile and León, Spain
Result	Umayyad victory

Belligerents
Kingdom of Asturias	Emirate of Córdoba

Commanders and leaders
Bermudo I of Asturias	Yusuf ibn Bukht; Hisham I of Córdoba

The Battle of Río Burbia or the Battle of the Burbia River was fought in the year 791 between the troops of the Kingdom of Asturias, commanded by King Bermudo I of Asturias, and the troops of the Emirate of Córdoba, led by Yusuf ibn Bukht. The battle occurred in the context of the Ghazws of Hisham I against the Asturians in the northern Iberian Peninsula. The battle took place near the Río Burbia, in the area which is today known as Villafranca del Bierzo. The battle resulted in a victory for the Emirate of Cordoba.

== Battle ==
Hisham I of Córdoba, in his attempt to annex the Kingdom of Asturias, organized two armies for the purpose of enforcing this annexation. The first army was tasked with conquering Galicia, and the second with conquering western Basque lands. When Hisham I was returning to Córdoban territory with the spoils of his conquests, the Asturian army attacked. The Cordoban army, under the competent leadership of general Yusuf ibn Bukht, were able to successfully repel the attack and to further turn the ambush into a victory.

== Consequences ==
The retreat of the Asturian army provoked the abdication of King Bermudo in favor of Alfonso II of Asturias, son of King Fruela I of Asturias, grandson of Alfonso I of Asturias, and great-grandson of Pelagius of Asturias. Alfonso's first move as the new king would be to move the capital to Oviedo. He was crowned according to the rights of the old Visigothic kings in Toledo on September 14, 791.

== See also ==
- Bermudo I of Asturias
- Reconquista
  - Asturias in the Reconquista

== Bibliography ==
- Díez, Gonzalo Martínez (2005). El condado de Castilla, 711-1038: La historia frente a la la leyenda (in Spanish). Marcial Pons Historia. ISBN 978-84-95379-94-8.
- Val, Manuel Criado de (1996). Caminería hispánica: Caminería física (in Spanish). Patronato Arcipreste de Hita. ISBN 978-84-87743-67-2.
- Alberini, Coriolano; Virasoro, Miguel Angel (1946). Logos: Revista de la Facultad de Filosofía y Letras (in Spanish).
- Bisson, Thomas N. (19 April 2013). Cultures of Power: Lordship, Status, and Process in Twelfth-Century Europe. University of Pennsylvania Press. ISBN 978-0-8122-0076-8.
- Esparza, José Javier (3 November 2009). La gran aventura del reino de Asturias: Así comenzó la Reconquista (in Spanish). La Esfera de los Libros. ISBN 978-84-9970-404-3.
