= Battle of Covadonga =

722 opening battle of the Reconquista of Spain

- Part of the Reconquista
- Map of the Umayyad invasion, showing Covadonga
Date	Summer of 722 AD
Location	Picos de Europa near Covadonga, present-day Spain 43°18′32″N 5°03′20″W
Result	Asturian victory
Territorial changes	Beginning of the Reconquista

Belligerents
Kingdom of Asturias	Umayyad Caliphate

Commanders and leaders
Pelagius of Asturias	Munuza †; Alqama †

The Battle of Covadonga took place in 722 between the army of Pelagius of Asturias and the army of Umayyad Caliphate commanders Alqama and Munuza. Fought near Covadonga, in the Picos de Europa, the outcome was victory for the Christian forces of Pelagius. It is traditionally regarded as the foundational event of the Kingdom of Asturias and thus the initial point of the Christian Reconquista (reconquest) of Iberia after the Umayyad conquest of 711.

== Background ==
According to texts written by Mozarabs in northern Hispania during the late ninth century, the Visigoths in 718 elected a nobleman named Pelagius (c.685–737) as their princeps, or leader. Pelagius, the first monarch of the Asturian Kingdom, son of Favila, who had been a dignitary at the court of the Visigoth King Egica (687–700), established his headquarters at Cangas de Onís, Asturias and incited an uprising against the Umayyad Muslims.

From the beginning of the Muslim invasion of Hispania, refugees and combatants from the south of the peninsula had been moving north to avoid Islamic authority. Some had taken refuge in the remote mountains of Asturias in the northwestern part of the Iberian Peninsula. There, from among the dispossessed of the south, Pelagius recruited his band of fighters.

Historian Joseph F. O'Callaghan says the remnants of the Hispano-Gothic aristocracy still played an important role in the society of Hispania. At the end of Visigothic rule, the assimilation of Hispano-Romans and Visigoths was occurring at a fast pace. Their nobility had begun to think of themselves as constituting one people, the gens Gothorum or the Hispani. An unknown number of them fled and took refuge in Asturias or Septimania. In Asturias they supported Pelagius's uprising, and joining with the indigenous leaders, formed a new aristocracy. The population of the mountain region consisted of native Astures, Galicians, Cantabri, Basques and other groups unassimilated into Hispano-Gothic society.

Pelagius's first acts were to refuse to pay the jizya (tax on non-Muslims) to the Muslims any longer and to assault the small Umayyad garrisons that had been stationed in the area. Eventually, he managed to expel a provincial governor named Munuza from Asturias. He held the territory against a number of attempts to re-establish Muslim control, and soon founded the Kingdom of Asturias, which became a Christian stronghold against further Muslim expansion.

For the first few years, this rebellion posed no threat to the new masters of Hispania, whose seat of power had been established at Córdoba. Consequently, there was only a minor perfunctory reaction. Pelagius was not always able to keep the Muslims out of Asturias but neither could they defeat him, and as soon as the Moors left, he would always re-establish control. Islamic forces were focused on raiding Narbonne and Gaul, and there was a shortage of manpower for putting down an inconsequential insurrection in the mountains. Pelagius never attempted to force the issue, and an Umayyad defeat elsewhere probably set the stage for the Battle of Covadonga. On July 9, 721, a Muslim force that had crossed the Pyrenees and invaded Francia was defeated in the Battle of Toulouse (721). This was the first serious setback in the Muslim campaign in southwestern Europe. Reluctant to return to Córdoba with such unalloyed bad news, the Umayyad wāli, Anbasa ibn Suhaym al-Kalbi, decided that putting down the rebellion in Asturias on his way home would afford his troops an easy victory and raise their flagging morale.

== Battle ==
In 722, forces commanded by the Umayyad commanders Alqama and Munuza, according to legend accompanied by Bishop Oppas of Seville, were sent to Asturias. As Alqama overran much of the region, folklore suggests that Oppas attempted, unsuccessfully, to broker the surrender of his fellow Christians. Pelagius and his force retreated deep into the mountains of Asturias, eventually retiring into a narrow valley flanked by mountains, which was easily defensible due to the impossibility of launching a broad-fronted attack.

Alqama eventually arrived at Covadonga, and sent forward an envoy to convince Pelagius to surrender. Pelagius refused, so Alqama ordered his best troops into the valley. The Asturians shot arrows and stones from the slopes of the mountains, and then, at the climactic moment, Pelagius personally led some of his soldiers out into the valley from a cave where they had been hiding. The Christian accounts of the battle claim that the slaughter among the Muslims was horrific, while Umayyad accounts describe it as a mere skirmish. Alqama himself fell in the battle, and his soldiers withdrew from the battlefield.

== Aftermath ==
In the aftermath of Pelagius's victory, the people of the conquered villages of Asturias emerged with their weapons and killed hundreds of Alqama's retreating troops. Munuza, learning of the defeat, organized another force, and gathered what was left of the survivors of Covadonga. At some later date, he confronted Pelagius and his now greatly augmented force, near the modern town of Proaza. Again Pelagius won, and Munuza was killed in the fighting. The battle is commemorated at the shrine of Our Lady of Covadonga.

== See also ==
- Asturias in the Reconquista
