= Alqama (8th century) =

Muslim general

Al Qama
- Died: 722; Covadonga, Kingdom of Asturias
- Other names: Al Kama, Alqama, Alkama and Alaqama
- Military career
- Rank: General
- Conflicts: Battle of Covadonga †

ʿAlqama or ʿAlḳama (Arabic: علقمة) was a distinguished Umayyad general who served in northern Iberia at the beginning of the 8th century.

By order of Munuza, governor of the Kingdom of Asturias, Al Qama commanded an army tasked to end the riot of Pelagius of Asturias. Al Qama's army arrived and set up camp in the Cantabrian Mountains near the town of Covadonga where Pelagius was hiding. After Pelagius refused to surrender, Al Qama ordered his soldiers to enter the mountain pass, where they were ambushed and the Battle of Covadonga ensued. Al Qama was killed; his army dispersed and retreated from Asturias.

He was probably the father of ʿAbd al-Raḥmān ibn ʿAlḳama al-Lakhmī who later became the governor of Arbunah.
