= Battle of Lutos =

794 battle

Coordinates: 43.3333°N 6.4167°W

- Part of the Reconquista
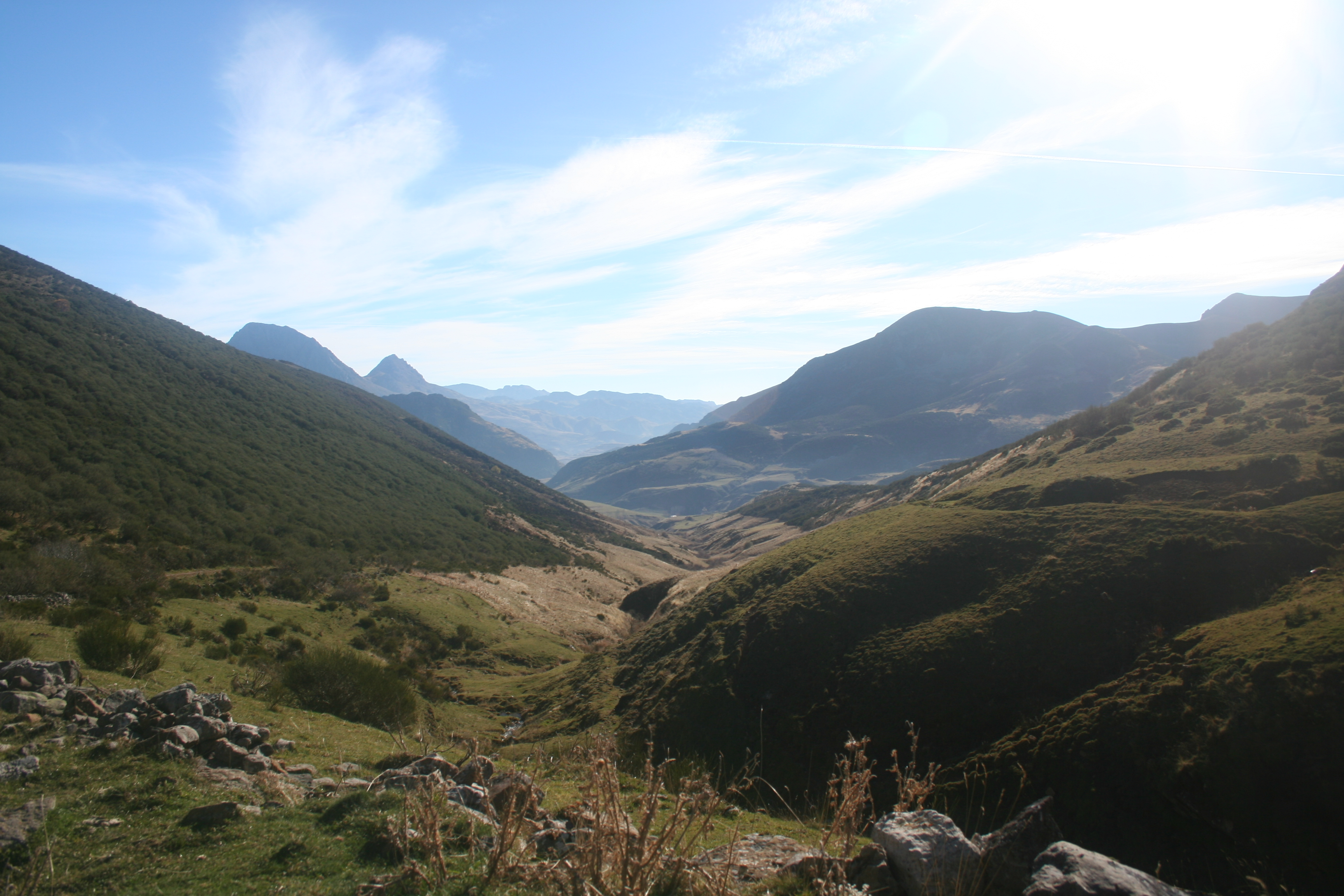
- The Camino Real del Puerto de la Mesa where the battle took place.
Date	794
Location	Asturias, Spain
Result	Christian victory

Belligerents
Kingdom of Asturias	Emirate of Córdoba

Commanders and leaders
Alfonso II of Asturias	Abd al-Malik ibn Abd al-Walid ibn Mugaith †; Abd al-Karim ibn Abd al-Walid ibn Mugaith

Casualties and losses
Unknown	Unknown

The Battle of Lutos occurred in 794 when the Emir of Cordoba, Hisham I sent military incursions against the Kingdom of Asturias under the command of the brothers Abd al-Karim ibn Abd al-Walid ibn Mugaith and Abd al-Malik ibn Abd al-Walid ibn Mugaith.

== Battle ==
Abd al-Karim carried out a scorched earth campaign of aggression against the lands of Álava, whilst his brother Abd al-Malik directed his forces into the heart of the Asturian Kingdom without encountering significant resistance aside from the town of Oviedo. He ravaged much of the countryside, including churches built by Fruela I of Asturias. Upon their return to Al-Andalus, in the valley of Camino Real del Puerto de la Mesa, they were set upon by King Alfonso II of Asturias and the forces under his command. The Asturian forces ambushed the Muslim army in a part of the valley near Grado, Asturias that has been considered by historians to be the area around Los Lodos. The battle resulted in an Asturian victory and the majority of the invading Muslim army was wiped out. Abd al-Malik was killed in the action.

== Aftermath ==
After the crushing defeat, Hisham sent a punitive expedition the next year headed by his brother Abd al-Karim ibn Abd al-Walid ibn Mugaith, which defeated the Asturian army at the Battle of Las Babias and other engagements, and eventually conquered Oviedo. Once the winter of 795-796 set in, the Muslim troops retreated.

== See also ==
- Asturias in the Reconquista

== Sources ==
- Collins, Roger (28 January 2014). Caliphs and Kings: Spain, 796-1031. John Wiley & Sons. ISBN 978-1-118-73001-0.
- Ruiz, Enrique Martínez (January 2000). Atlas histórico de España. Ediciones AKAL. ISBN 978-84-7090-349-6.
- Pérez, Guillermo García (2002). Carlomagno, Asturias y España: Religión y poder en la Edad Media. Pentalfa Ediciones. ISBN 978-84-7848-508-6.
- Carroll, Warren Hasty (1987). The Building of Christendom. Christendom College Press. ISBN 978-0-931888-24-3.
- Pamungkas, Jati (23 January 2018). Perang Salib Timur dan Barat: Misi Merebut Yerusalem dan Mengalahkan Pasukan Islam di Eropa (in Indonesian). Anak Hebat Indonesia. ISBN 978-623-400-010-8.
- Bergqvist, Kim; Jensen, Kurt Villads; Lappin, Anthony John (8 December 2020). War, Diplomacy and Peacemaking in Medieval Iberia. Cambridge Scholars. ISBN 978-1-5275-6338-4.
