= Ibn al-Qitt =

Abu'l-Qasim Ahmad ibn Mu'awiya ibn Muhammad ibn Hisham ibn Mu'awiya ibn Hisham ibn Abd al-Rahman ibn Mu'awiya, known as Ibn al-Qitt (died 901), was an Umayyad rebel and self-proclaimed Mahdi in the Emirate of Córdoba.

A member of the Umayyad royal family, he was a great-great-grandson of Hisham I of Córdoba. Convinced by the ascetic Abu Ali al-Sarrai (possibly an Isma'ili Shia agent sowing discord), who presented him as Mahdi, Ibn al-Qitt rebelled against the emiral rule of Abdullah ibn Muhammad al-Umawi in Córdoba, and waged a Jihad against Christians. Apparently followed in his rebellion by Berbers (including Nafza and Kutama tribes) from Llano de los Pedroches, sierra de Almadén, Trujillo, the Guadiana basin, south-west Iberia, Toledo, Talavera and Santaver, his first military operation in Christian lands was an attack in 901 AD against Zamora, where, following the defection of a number of Berber chieftains, he was reportedly captured and beheaded.
