= Cellorigo =

- Municipality
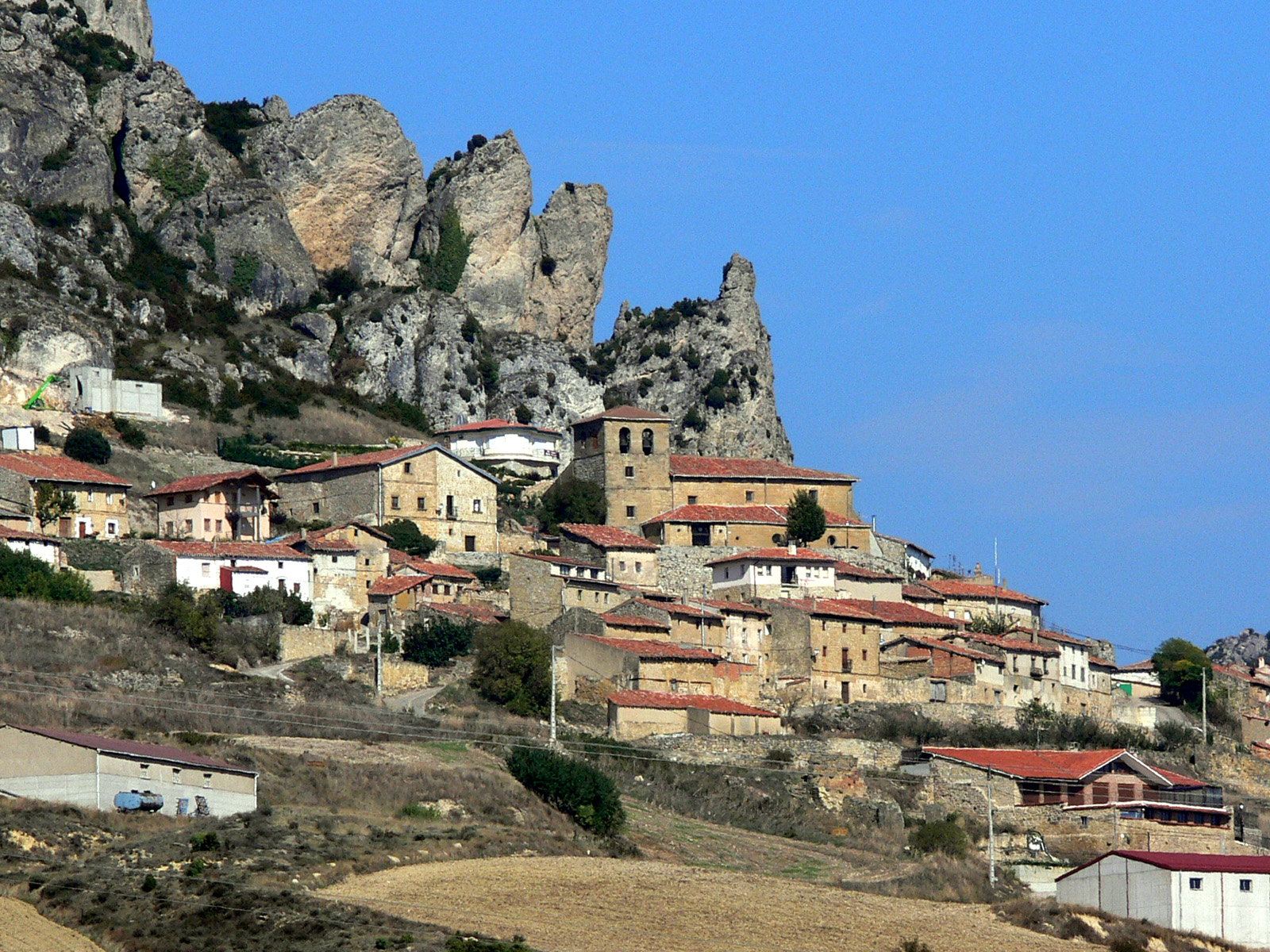

- Location within La Rioja, Spain Location within Spain
- Coordinates: 42°37′38″N 2°59′58″W
- Country: Spain
- Autonomous community: La Rioja
- Comarca: Haro

Government
  - Mayor: Isidro Busto López de Silanes (PP)

Area
  - Total: 12.43 km^{2} (4.80 sq mi)
- Elevation: 782 m (2,566 ft)

Population (2025-01-01)
  - Total: 15
- Demonym(s): cellorigano, na
- Postal code: 26212
- Website: www.cellorigo.com

Cellorigo is a village in the province and autonomous community of La Rioja, Spain. The municipality covers an area of 12.43 square kilometres (4.80 sq mi) and as of 2011 had a population of 13 people.
