= Battle of Polvoraria =

Coordinates: 41.9661°N 5.6822°W

- Part of the Reconquista
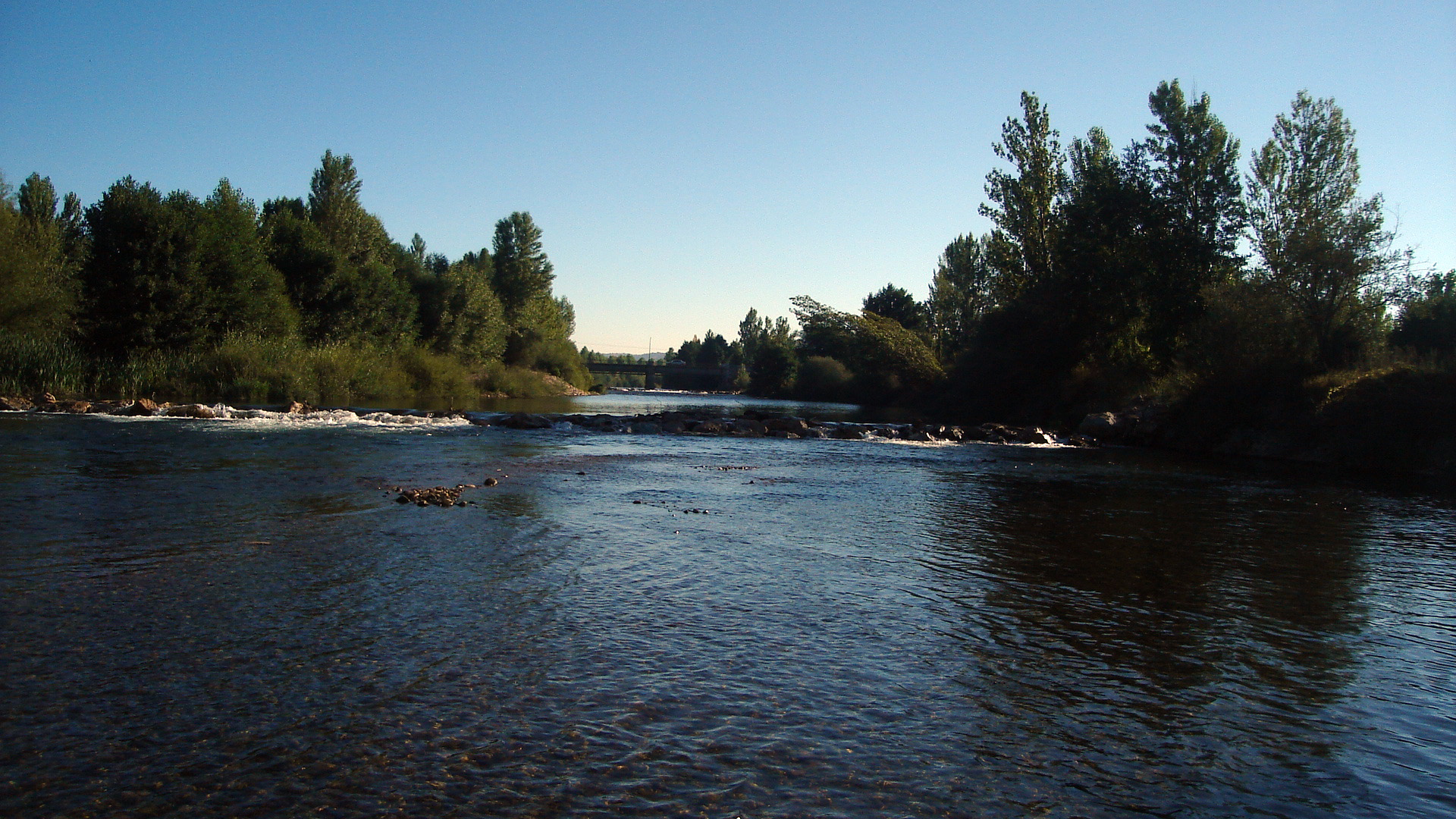
- Orbigo river, next to which the battle took place.
Date	878
Location	Near the confluence of the Órbigo and Esla rivers.
Result	Asturian victory

Belligerents
Kingdom of Asturias	Emirate of Córdoba

Commanders and leaders
Alfonso III of Asturias	Muhammad I of Córdoba

Casualties and losses
unknown	12,000-13,000 killed (probably exaggerated)

The Battle of Polvoraria (also known as the Battle of Polvorosa) took place in 878 between troops of the Kingdom of Asturias under Alfonso III of Asturias and a Muslim army of the Emirate of Córdoba under Emir Muhammad I of Córdoba. It occurred near the confluence of the Órbigo and Esla rivers and was an Asturian victory.

== Context ==
The battle's name, Polvoraria, comes from the name of the territory where it took place, which in turn derives from the name of a hill fort located between Mózar and Milles de la Polvorosa. This fortified settlement dominated the territory bounded by the mouths of the Tera and Órbigo rivers, and its existence is preserved in the current toponymy as Polvorosa. Other authors, however, believe that the battle's name stemmed from the strong winds that would have kicked up a large cloud of dust (polvo) during the fighting.

It unfolded in a context where the Duero River formed the dividing line between the Muslim and Christian kingdoms, at a time when Al-Mundhir of Córdoba was attempting to reconquer the fortified city of Zamora. The Emirate of Córdoba had fielded two armies, which were both defeated by Christian troops. One army assembled in Córdoba and was defeated at the aforementioned Battle of Polvoraria, while the other, assembled in Toledo, was defeated on the plains of Valdemora —or the Niora Valley— along with the remnants of the first army.

=== Development of the Battles ===
The Muslim troops, after crossing the Deustamben bridge—built at that time over the Esla River, near the present-day town of Arcos de la Polvorosa—, continued along the right bank of the Órbigo River towards Astorga. They fell into an ambush by Alfonso III near Mount Socastro, in an attack that resulted in a resounding defeat for the Moors, according to the historian Sánchez-Albornoz.

In the second battle, the Asturian troops were supposedly commanded by Bernardo del Carpio, and according to tradition, only ten Muslims survived, hiding among the corpses of their comrades and feigning death. Later chronicles would exaggerate the losses among the Muslim ranks, even citing 12,000-13,000 dead.

According to Arab historiography, Ibn al-Athir mentions an expedition in 878 towards León, which would end in a battle with significant losses on both sides. Ibn 'Idhari, on the other hand, states that this expedition approached from the city of Coimbra and was a complete success, without mentioning any battle.

== Aftermath ==
Following the Christian victories, a three-year truce was signed, during which the repopulation and fortification of new settlements was prohibited. This truce was subsequently violated by King Alfonso. Over time, the outcome of these battles led to the repopulation and control of the Duero Valley by Christian forces.

== See also ==
- Asturias in the Reconquista

== Sources ==
- Ballesteros, Enrique (2005). Estudio histórico de Ávila. MAXTOR. ISBN 8497611985.
- Collins, Roger (2012). Caliphs and Kings: Spain, 796-1031. John Wiley & Sons. ISBN 0631181849.
- González Rodríguez, Rafael (1996). "Repoblación y reorganización de la red viaria, el puente de Deustamben (siglos XII-XIV)" (PDF). Brigecio: revista de estudios de Benavente y sus tierras (6): 153-178. ISSN 1697-5804. Archived from the original (PDF) on 4 March 2016.
- Gutiérrez González, José Avelino (1992). "Castillos y sistemas de defensa en los reinos de León y Castilla". II Semana de Estudios Medievales, Nájera 5 al 9 de agosto de 1991 (PDF). p. 31-48. ISBN 84-87252-01-X.
- de Prado Reyero, Julio (1994). Siguiendo las huellas de San Froilán. San Esteban. ISBN 8487557708.
- Rodríguez Díez, Matías (2008). Historia de la Muy Noble, Leal y Benemérita Ciudad de Astorga. MAXTOR. ISBN 8497614100.
- del Ser Quijano, Gregorio; Martín Viso, Iñaki (2007). Espacios de poder y formas sociales en la Edad Media. Estudios dedicados a Ángel Barrios. Volumen 116 de Colección Aquilafuente. Universidad de Salamanca. ISBN 8478003630.

== Bibliography ==
- (in Spanish) Sánchez-Albornoz, Claudio (1932). «La batalla de Polvoraria». Anales de la Universidad de Madrid I: 225–238.
