= Abd al-Rahman III =

Ruler of Córdoba from 912 to 961

Abd al-Rahman III عبد الرحمن الناصر لدين الله
- Amir al-Mu'minīn; al-Nāṣir li-Dīn Allāh
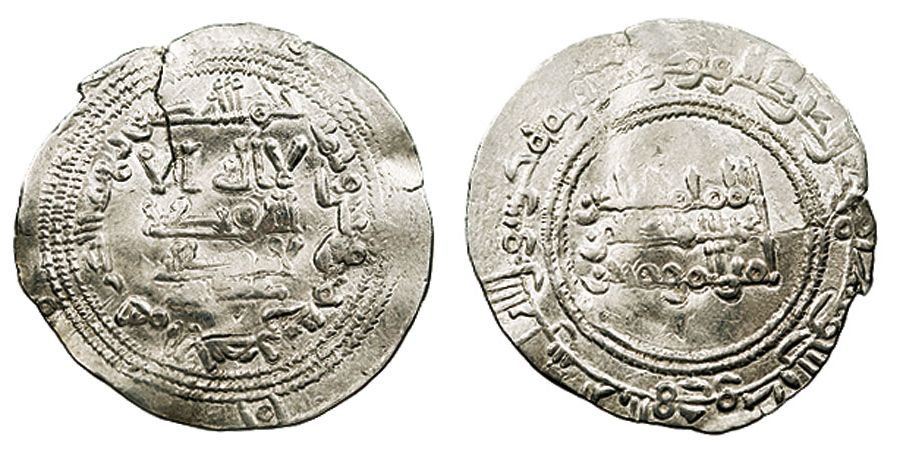
- Silver dirham of Abd al-Rahman III, minted in 946 AD

1st Caliph of Córdoba
- Reign: 17 January 929 – 15 October 961
- Proclamation: 17 January 929 (aged 39)
- Successor: Al-Hakam II

8th Emir of Córdoba
- Reign: 16 October 912 – 17 January 929
- Bay'ah: 17 October 912 (aged 22)
- Predecessor: Abdullah
- Born: 18 December 890; Córdoba
- Died: 15 October 961 (aged 70); Córdoba
- Burial: Alcázar of Córdoba
- Consort: Fatima bint Al-Mundhir; Marjan or Murjan
- Issue: Sons in order of birth according to Ibn Hazm: Al-Hakam II (son of Murjan); Abd al-Aziz; Al-Asbagh; Ubayd Allah; Abd al-Jabbar; Abd al-Malik; Sulayman; Abdullah; Marwan; Al-Mundhir; Al-Mugira
- Dynasty: Umayyad
- Father: Muhammad ibn Abdullah
- Mother: Muzna (originally Maria)
- Religion: Sunni Islam (Maliki school)
- Arabic name
- Patronymic (Nasab): Abd al-Rahman ibn Muhammad ibn Abdallah ibn Muhammad ibn Abd al-Rahman ibn al-Hakam ibn Hisham ibn Abd al-Rahman ibn Mu'awiya ibn Hisham
- Teknonymic (Kunya): Abu al-Mutarrif
- Toponymic (Nisba): al-Marwani al-Umawi al-Qurashi

ʿAbd al-Raḥmān ibn Muḥammad ibn ʿAbd Allāh ibn Muḥammad ibn ʿAbd al-Raḥmān ibn al-Ḥakam ibn Hishām ibn ʿAbd al-Raḥmān al-Marwānī al-Umawī al-Qurashī (Arabic: عبد الرحمن بن محمد بن عبد الله بن محمد بن عبد الرحمن بن الحكم بن هشام بن عبد الرحمن المرواني، الأموي، القرشي; 890–961), or simply ʿAbd al-Raḥmān III, was the eighth and final Emir of Córdoba from 912 to 929. In 929, he elevated the emirate to the Caliphate of Córdoba, serving as its first caliph until his death. Abd al-Rahman won the laqab (sobriquet) al-Nāṣir li-Dīn Allāh (lit. 'the Defender of God's Faith') in his early 20s when he supported the Maghrawa Berbers in North Africa against Fatimid expansion and later claimed the title of Caliph for himself. His half-century reign was known for its religious tolerance.

Domestically, Abd al-Rahman crushed internal rebellions and constructed the palace-city of Medina Azahara. Northern Christian kingdoms engaged him in military conflict, such as at the Battle of Valdejunquera and the Battle of Simancas, before ultimately submitting to his diplomatic supremacy by the end of his reign, leading neighboring Christian rulers to pay him homage.

== Early life ==
=== Lineage and appearance ===
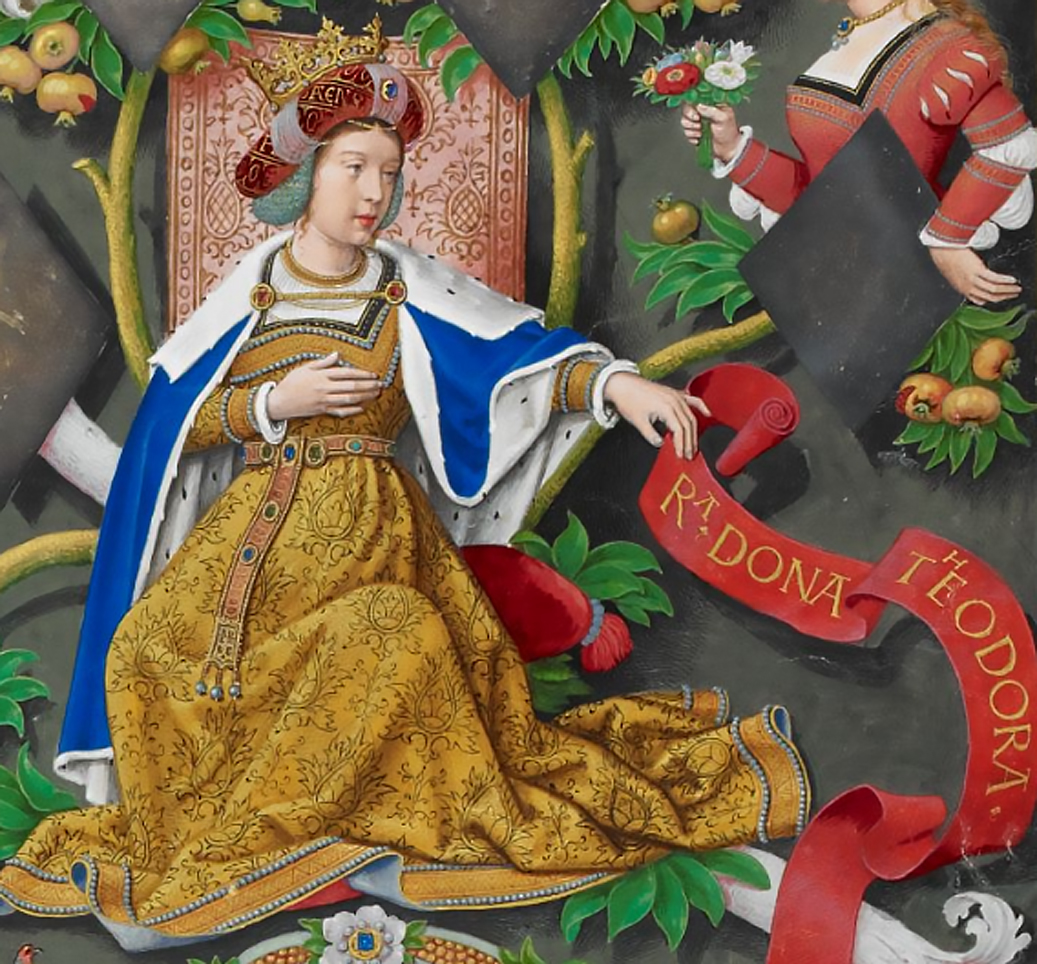
Toda Aznares half aunt of Abd al-Rahman III

Abd al-Rahman was born in Córdoba, on 18 December 890. His year of birth is also given as 889 and 891. He was the grandson of Abdullah ibn Muhammad al-Umawi, seventh independent Umayyad emir of al-Andalus. His parents were Abdullah's son Muhammad and Muzna (or Muzayna), a Christian concubine. His paternal grandmother was also a Christian, the royal infanta Onneca Fortúnez, daughter of the captive king Fortún Garcés of Pamplona. Abd al-Rahman was thus nephew in the half-blood of queen Toda of Pamplona. He is described as having "white skin, blue eyes and attractive face; good looking, although somewhat sturdy and stout. His legs were short, to the point that the stirrups of his saddle were mounted just one palm under it. When mounted, he looked tall, but on his feet he was quite short. He dyed his beard black." He had reddish-blond hair, which he reportedly dyed black to appear more "Arab".

=== Harem youth ===
Muhammad was assassinated by his brother Al-Mutarrif, who had allegedly grown jealous of the favour Muhammad had gained in the eyes of their father Abdallah. Al-Mutarrif had accused Muhammad of plotting with the rebel Umar ibn Hafsun, and Muhammad had been imprisoned. According to some sources, the emir himself was behind Muhammad's fall, as well as Al-Mutarrif's death in 895. Abd al-Rahman spent his youth in his mother's harem. Al-Mutarrif's sister, known as al-Sayyida ("the Lady"), was entrusted with his education. She made sure that Abd al-Rahman's education was conducted with some rigour. It was claimed that he had learned and known the local Mozarabic language.

== Reign ==
=== Accession to throne ===
Emir Abdallah died at the age of 72. Despite four of his sons (Aban, Abd al Rahman, Muhammad and Ahmad) being alive at the time of his death, all of them were passed over for succession. Abdallah instead chose as his successor his grandson, Abd al-Rahman III (the son of his first son). This came as no surprise, since Abdallah had already demonstrated his affection for his grandson in many ways, namely by allowing him to live in his own tower (something he did not allow for any of his sons), and allowing him to sit on the throne on some festive occasions. Most importantly, Abdallah gave Abd al-Rahman his ring, the symbol of power, when Abdallah fell ill prior to his death.

Abd al-Rahman succeeded Abdallah the day after his death, 16 October 912. Historiographers of the time, such as Al-Bayan al-Mughrib and the Crónica anónima de Abd al-Rahman III, state that his succession was "without incident". At the time, Abd al-Rahman was about 21 or 22 years old. He inherited an emirate on the verge of dissolution, his power extending not far beyond the vicinity of Córdoba. To the north, the Christian Kingdom of Asturias was continuing its program of Reconquista in the Douro valley. To the south in Ifriqiya, the Fatimids had created an independent caliphate that threatened to attract the allegiance of the Muslim population, who had suffered under the harsh rule of Abdullah. On the internal front the discontented Muwallad families (Muslims of Iberian origin) represented a constant danger for the Córdoban emir. The most powerful of the latter was Umar ibn Hafsun, who, from his impregnable fortress of Bobastro, controlled much of eastern Al-Andalus.

From the very early stages of his reign, Abd al-Rahman showed a firm resolve to quash the rebels of al-Andalus, consolidate and centralise power, and re-establish internal order within the emirate. Within 10 days of taking the throne, he exhibited the head of a rebel leader in Cordoba. From this point on he led annual expeditions against the northern and southern tribes to maintain control over them. To accomplish his aims he introduced into the court the saqalibah, slaves of East European origin. The saqalibah represented a third ethnic group that could neutralise the endless strife between his subjects of Muslim Arab heritage, and those of Muslim Berber heritage.

Hasdai ibn Shaprut, a Jewish courtier in the king's court who served as financier to the king, wrote of the king's revenues:

The revenue of the king [Abd al-Rahman] amounts annually to 100,000 florins, this arising only from the income derived from the numerous merchants who come hither from various countries and isles. All their commerce and affairs must be subjected to my guidance, praised be the Almighty, who bestows his mercy upon me! The kings of the world no sooner perceive of the greatness of my monarch, than they hasten to convey to him presents in abundance. It is myself who am appointed to receive such presents, and at the same time to return rewards awarded to them.

=== Early rule ===
During the first 20 years of his rule, Abd al-Rahman avoided military action against the northern Christian kingdoms, Asturias and the Kingdom of Navarre. The Muwallad rebels were the first problem he confronted. Those powerful families were supported by Iberians who were openly or secretly Christians and had acted with the rebels. These elements, which formed the bulk of the population, were not averse to supporting a strong ruler who would protect them against the Arab aristocracy. Abd al-Rahman moved to subdue them by means of a mercenary army that included Christians.

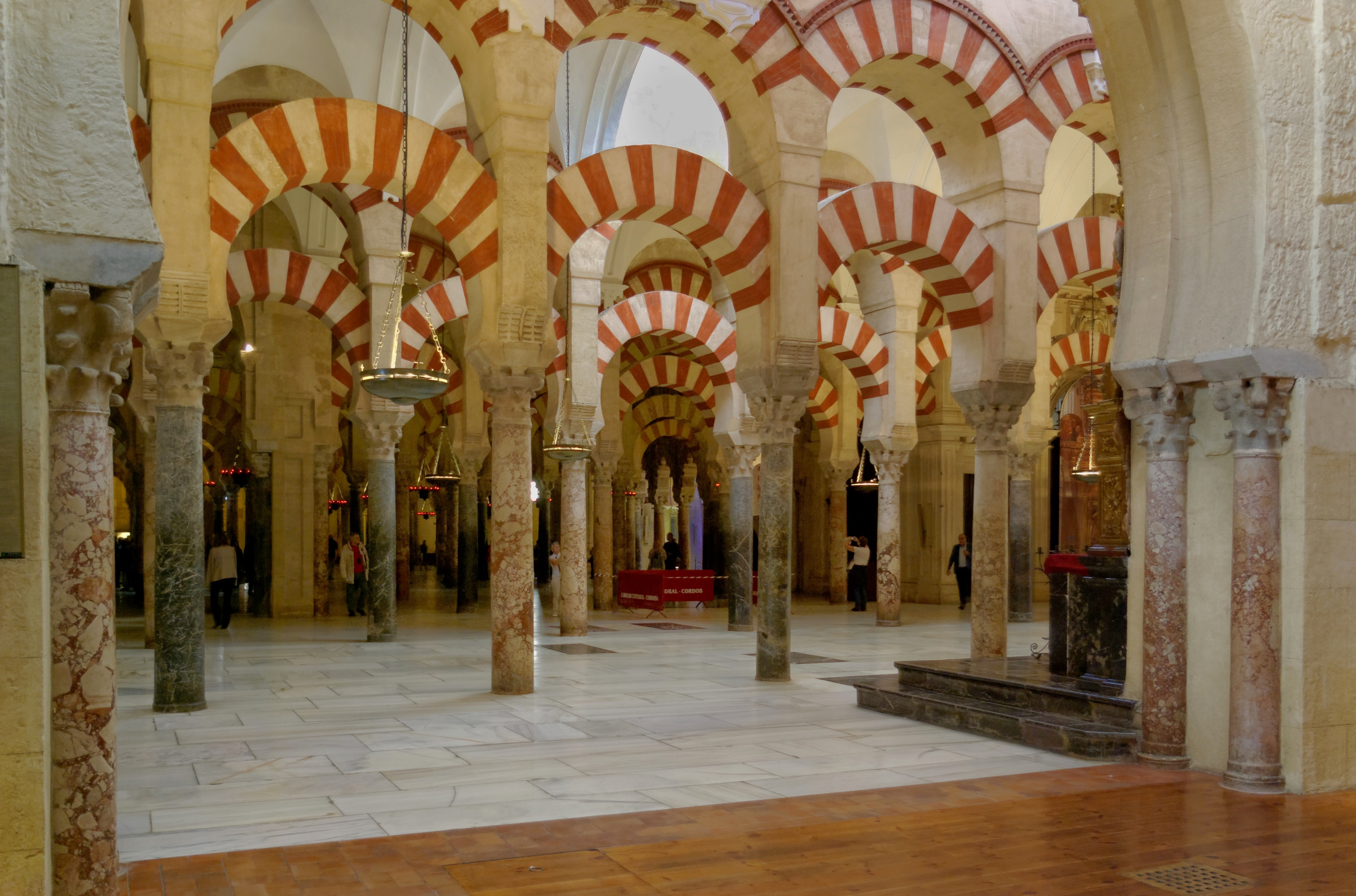
The Mosque–Cathedral of Córdoba

He first had to suppress the rebel Umar ibn Hafsun. On 1 January 913 an army, led by the eunuch Badr, conquered the fortress of Écija, at some 50 kilometres (31 mi) from the capital. All the city's fortifications were destroyed, aside from the citadel, which was left as the residence of the governor and a garrison for the emirati troops.

In the following spring, after sixty-five days of meticulous preparations, Abd al-Rahman personally led an expedition to the south of his realm. His troops were able to recover the Kūras (provinces) of Jaén and Granada, while a cavalry detachment was sent to free Málaga from ibn Hafsun's siege. He also obtained the capitulation of Fiñana (in the modern province of Almería), after setting fire to its suburbs. Subsequently, he moved against the castle of Juviles in the Alpujarras. After devastating the surrounding countryside to deprive the castle of any resources, he encircled it. Finding it difficult to bombard with catapults, he ordered the construction of a platform where his siege engines could be mounted to greater effect, and cut the water supply. The Muwallad defenders surrendered after a few days: their lives, apart from fifty-five die-hards who were beheaded, were spared in exchange for their allegiance to the emir. The campaign continued in a similar vein, lasting for a total of ninety days. Abd al-Rahman forced the defeated Muwallad to send hostages and treasures to Córdoba, in order to secure their continued submission.

During the first year of his reign, Abd al-Rahman took advantage of the rivalries between the Banu Hajjaj lords of Seville and Carmona to force them to submit. He initially sent a special corps (hasam) under Ahmad ibn Muhammad ibn Hudayr, governor of Écija, to Seville, to obtain their submission. This attempt failed, but gained him the support of Muhammad ibn Ibrahim ibn Hajjaj, lord of Carmona, and a cousin of the Sevillan lord, Ahmad ibn Maslama. When the latter was surrounded by Umayyad troops, he sued for help to Ibn Hafsun, but the latter was defeated by the besiegers and returned to Bobastro. Abd al-Rahman next went after the forts in the provinces of Elvira, Granada, and Jaén, all of which were either directly or indirectly controlled by Hafsun. Seville finally capitulated on 20 December 913. Sa'id ibn al-Mundhir al-Qurashi, a member of the royal family, was named governor of the city, while the Lord of Carmona obtained the title of vizier. Muhammad ibn Ibrahim enjoyed his office for only a single day, for Abd al-Rahman soon discovered his collusion with the rebel governor of Carmona. Muhammad was sent to prison, where he later met his death. The region of Valencia submitted peacefully in 915.

=== Ibn Hafsun and other rebels ===
Abd al-Rahman's next objective was to quash the long-standing rebellion of Umar ibn Hafsun. His troops left Córdoba on 7 May 914 and, after a few days, encamped before the walls of Balda (identified with today's Cuevas de San Marcos). His cavalry ravaged the nearby woods and the countryside, while the rest of the troops moved to Turrus, a castle located in the present municipality of Algarinejo, which was surrounded within five days, while its environs were also devastated.

The Umayyad army then moved to the citadel of ʿUmar ibn Hafsun, while the cavalry was sent to the castle of Sant Batir, which was abandoned by the defenders, allowing Abd al-Rahman's troops to secure a large booty. Then it was the turn of the castles of Olías and Reina. The latter fell after a violent fight, leaving the road open to the major city and provincial capital of Málaga, which he captured after one day. Abd al-Rahman then turned and followed the coast by Montemayor, near Benahavís, Suhayl (Fuengirola) and another castle called Turrus or Turrus Jusayn (identified by Évariste Lévi-Provençal as Ojén). He finally arrived at Algeciras on 1 June 914. He ordered a patrol of the coast to destroy the boats that supplied the citadel of Umar ibn Hafsun from the Maghreb. Many of them were captured and set afire in front of the emir. The rebellious castles near Algeciras surrendered as soon as the Cordoban army appeared.

Abd al-Rahman launched three different campaigns against Ibn Hafsun (who died in 917) and his sons. One of Ibn Hafsun's sons, Jaʿfar ibn Hafsun, held the stronghold of Toledo. Abd al-Rahman ravaged the countryside around the city. Ja'far, after two years of siege, escaped from the city to ask for help in the northern Christian kingdoms. In the meantime Abd al-Rahman obtained the surrender of the city from its population, after promising them immunity, although 4,000 rebels escaped in a night sally. The city surrendered on 2 August 932, after a siege of two years.

In 921 the Banu Muhallab of Guadix submitted, followed by those of Jerez de la Frontera and Cádiz, as well as the trading republic of Pechina a year later. In 927, Abd al-Rahman also launched a campaign against the rebel Banu Qasi, but was forced to break it off following the intervention of Jimeno Garcés of Pamplona.

The last of the sons of Ibn Hafsun to fall was Hafs, who commanded his powerful fortress of Umar ibn Hafsun. Surrounded by troops commanded by Abd al-Rahman's vizier, Sa'id ibn al-Mundhir, who had ordered the construction of bastions around the city, he resisted the siege for six months, until he surrendered in 928 and had his life spared.

=== The Levente and Algarve rebels ===
The continued expeditions against the Hafsunids did not distract Abd al-Rahman III from the situation in other regions in al-Andalus, which recognized him only nominally, if not being in open revolt. Most of the loyal governors of the cities were in a weak position, such as the governor of Évora, who could not prevent an attack by the king of Galicia (and future king of León), Ordoño II, who captured the city in the summer of 913, taking back a sizable booty and 4,000 prisoners and massacring many Muslims. In most of the eastern and western provinces, Abd al-Rahman's authority was not recognized. The lord of Badajoz, Abd Allah ibn Muhammad, grandson of Abd al-Rahman ibn Marwan al-Yilliqi, not only fortified his city against a possible attack from Ordoño, but also acted in complete independence from Córdoba.

To avoid the fall of Évora into the hands of the Berber groups of the region, the governor ordered the destruction of its defensive towers and lowered the walls, though a year later he decided to reconstruct it, giving its control to his ally Masud ibn Sa' dun al-Surunbaqi. The Algarve was dominated completely by a muladí coalition led by Saʿid ibn Mal, who had expelled the Arabs from Beja, and the lords of Ocsónoba, Yahya ibn Bakr, and of Niebla, Ibn Ufayr. Alcácer do Sal and Lisbon were under the control of the Banu Dānis.

The absence of royal authority enabled Ordoño II to easily campaign in this area, his main objective being the city of Mérida, in the summer of 915. Abd al-Rahman III did not send an army and only several local Berber jefes offered some resistance which was ineffective.

=== Assumption of the Caliphate ===
Letter proclaiming Abd al-Rahman III's assumption of the caliphal title

We are the most worthy to fulfill our right, and the most entitled to complete our good fortune, and to put on the clothing granted by the nobility of God, because of the favour which He has shown us, and the renown which He has given us, and the power to which He has raised us, because of what He has enabled us to acquire, and because of what He has made easy for us and for our state [? dynasty; Arabic: dawla] to achieve; He has made our name and the greatness of our power celebrated everywhere; and He has made the hopes of the worlds depend on us [Arabic: a‘laqa], and made their errings turn again to us and their rejoicing at good news be (rejoicing at good news) about our dynasty [Arabic: dawla]. And praise be to God, possessed of grace and kindness, for the grace which He has shown, [God] most worthy of superiority for the superiority which He has granted us. We have decided that the da‘wa should be to us as Commander of the Faithful and that letters emanating from us or coming to us should be [headed] in the same manner. Everyone who calls himself by this name apart from ourselves is arrogating it to himself [unlawfully] and trespassing upon it and is branded with something to which he has no right. We know that if we were to continue [allowing] the neglect of this duty which is owed to us in this matter then we should be forfeiting our right and neglecting our title, which is certain. So order the khaṭīb in your place to pronounce [the khuṭba] using [this title] and address your communications to us accordingly, if God will. Written on Thursday, 2 Dhū al-Ḥijja 316 [16 January 929].

— Translated by David Wasserstein

Despite having defeated only some of the rebels, Abd al-Rahman III considered himself powerful enough to declare himself Caliph of Córdoba on 16 January 929, effectively breaking his allegiance to, and ties with, the Fatimid and Abbasid caliphs. The caliphate was thought only to belong to the Emperor who ruled over the sacred cities of Mecca and Medina, and his ancestors had until then been content with the title of emir. But the force of this tradition had weakened over time; and the title increased Abd al-Rahman's prestige with his subjects, both in Iberia and Africa. He based his claim to the caliphate on his Umayyad ancestors who had held undisputed control of the caliphate until they were overthrown by the Abbasids.

Abd al-Rahman's move made him both the political and the religious leader of all the Muslims in al-Andalus, as well as the protector of his Christian and Jewish subjects. The symbols of his new caliphal power were a sceptre (jayzuran) and the throne (sarir). In the mint he had founded in November 928, Abd al-Rahman started to mint gold dinars and silver dirhams, replacing the "al-Andalus" title with his name.

In his new role as caliph, he achieved the surrender of Ibn Marwan of Badajoz in 930 as well as the surrender of the Banu Dānis of Alcácer do Sal. On the southern front, to counter the increasing Fatimid power in North Africa, abd al-Rahman ordered the construction of a fleet based in Almeria. The caliph helped the Maghrawa Berbers conquer Melilla (927), Ceuta (931) and Tangiers (951), who, in return, accepted his suzerainty. However, he was unable to defeat Jawhar al-Siqilli of the Fatimids. In 951 he signed a peace with the new king of León, Ordoño III, in order to have a free hand against the Fatimids whose ships were harassing caliphal shipping in the Mediterranean and had even launched an assault against Almeria. Abd al-Rahman's force, led by vizier Ahmad ibn Said, besieged the Fatimid port of Tunis, which bought its safety by paying a huge sum.

In the end he was able to create a protectorate covering the northern and central Maghreb, supporting the Idrisid dynasty; the Caliphate's influence in the area disappeared after a Fatimid offensive in 958, after which abd al-Rahman kept only the strongholds of Ceuta and Tangiers.

=== War with the Christian kingdoms of the north ===
Even before al-Andalus was firmly under his rule, he had restarted the war against King Ordoño II of León, who had taken advantage of the previous troublesome situation to capture some boundary areas and menace the Umayyad territory. In 917 the then emir had sent a large army under his general Ahmad ibn Abi Abda against León, but this force was destroyed at the Battle of San Esteban de Gormaz in September of that year.

Recognizing he had underestimated the power of Ordoño II, in 920 Abd al-Rahman mustered another powerful army to reclaim the territories lost after the previous campaign. He captured the forts of Osma and San Esteban de Gormaz. After defeating King Sancho Garcés I of Navarre and the king of León at Valdejunquera on 26 July, he penetrated into Navarre, overcoming Aragon by the classic route of the invasions from the south. Abd al-Rahman reached the Basque city of Pamplona, which was sacked and its cathedral church demolished.

In 924 Abd al-Rahman felt obliged to avenge the massacre of Viguera castle perpetrated by King Sancho Ordóñez of Navarre one year earlier. He launched a counter offensive against Sancho in which Abd al-Rahman devastated a large area of Basque territory.

The succession crisis which struck León after Ordoño II's death in the same year caused hostilities to cease until Ramiro II gained the throne in 932; a first attempt by him to assist the besieged rebels in Toledo was repelled in 932, despite the Christian king capturing Madrid.

In 934, after reasserting supremacy over Pamplona and Álava, Abd al-Rahman forced Ramiro to retreat to Burgos, and forced the Navarrese queen Toda, his aunt, to submit to him as a vassal and withdraw from direct rule as regent for her son García Sánchez I. In 937 Abd al-Rahman conquered some thirty castles in León. Next he turned to Muhammad ibn Hashim al-Tugib, governor of Zaragoza, who had allied with Ramiro but was pardoned after the capture of his city.

Despite early defeats, Ramiro and García were able to crush the caliphal army in 939 at the Battle of Simancas, and almost kill Abd al-Rahman, due to treason by Arab elements in the caliph's army. After this defeat, Abd al-Rahman stopped taking personal command of his military campaigns. His cause was helped, however, by Fernán González of Castile, one of the Christian leaders at Simancas, who subsequently launched a sustained rebellion against Ramiro. The victory of Simancas enabled the Christian kingdom to maintain the military initiative in the peninsula until the defeat of Ramiro's successor, Ordoño III of León, in 956. However, they did not press this advantage as civil war broke out in the Christian territories.

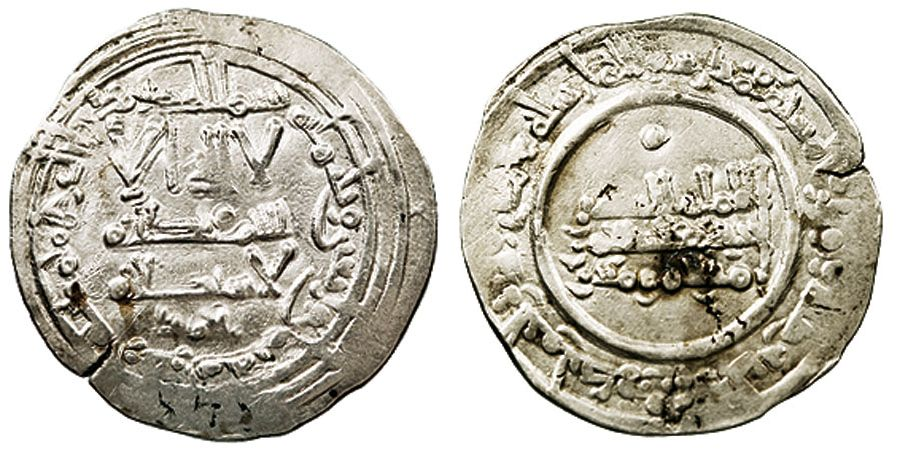
Dirham of Abd al-Rahman III, minted in Medina Azahara in 959/960 AD

In 950 Abd al-Rahman received in Córdoba an embassy from count Borrell II of Barcelona, by which the northern county recognized caliphal supremacy in exchange for peace and mutual support. In 958, Sancho, the exiled king of León, King García Sánchez of Pamplona, and his mother Queen Toda all paid homage to Abd al-Rahman in Córdoba.

Until 961, the caliphate played an active role in the dynastic strife characterising the Christian kingdoms during the period. Ordoño III's half-brother and successor, Sancho the Fat, had been deposed by his cousin Ordoño IV. Together with his grandmother Toda of Pamplona, Sancho sought an alliance with Córdoba. In exchange for some castles, Abd al-Rahman helped them to take back Zamora (959) and Oviedo (960) and to overthrow Ordoño IV.

=== Later years ===
Abd al-Rahman was accused of retreating in his later years into the "self-indulgent" comforts of his harem. Indeed, he is known to have openly kept a male as well as a female harem (in common with a few other rulers such as Hisham II and Al-Mu'tamid).

Abd al-Rahman spent the rest of his years in his new palace outside Córdoba. He died on 15 October 961 and was succeeded by his son al-Hakam II.

== Legacy ==
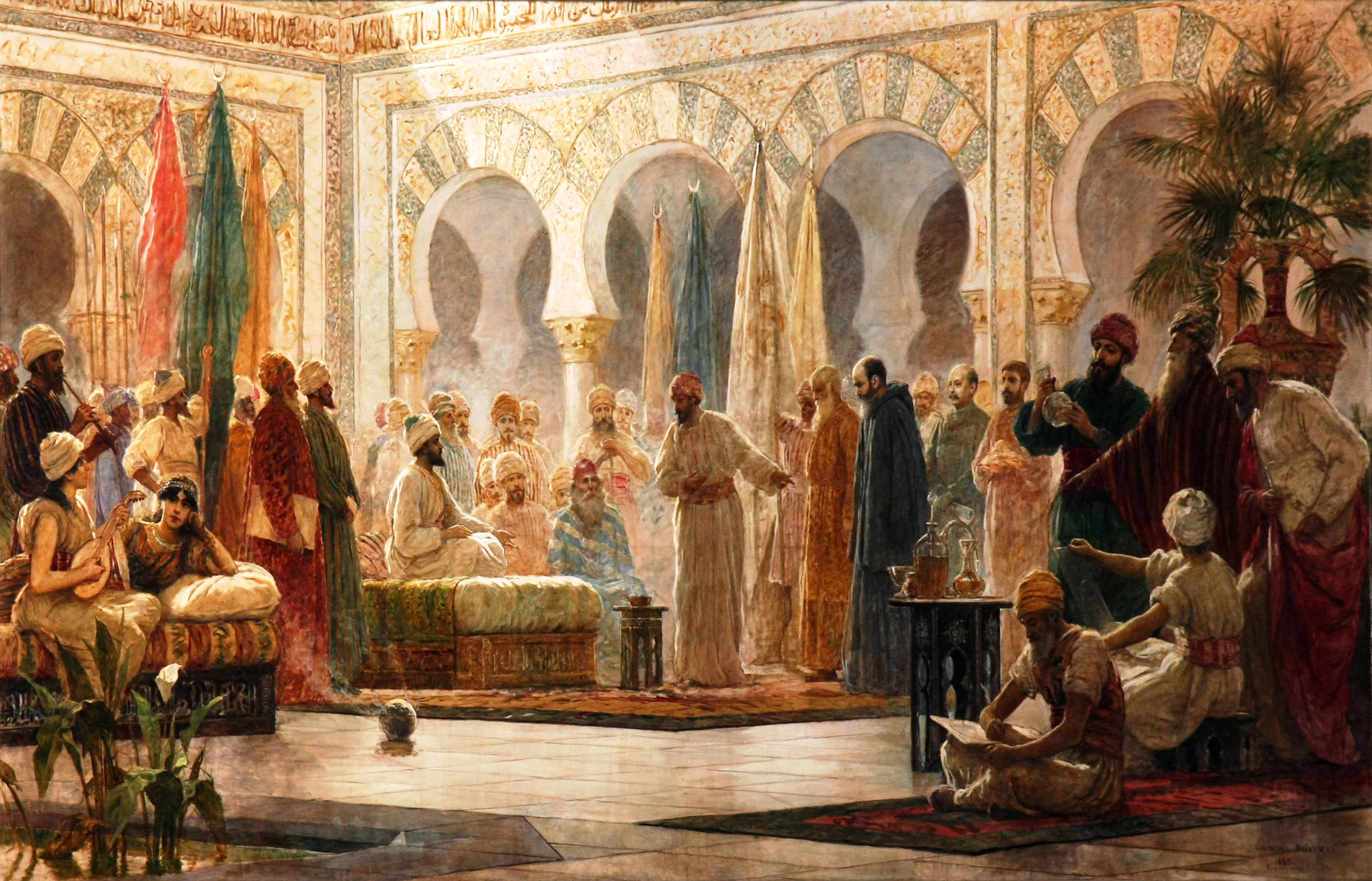
Abd al-Rahman III receiving ambassador John of Gorze of Otto I the Great at the Medina Azahara, by Dionisio Baixeras Verdaguer, 1885.

Abd al-Rahman was a great humanist and patron of arts, especially architecture. A third of his revenue sufficed for the ordinary expenses of government, a third was hoarded, and a third was spent on buildings. After declaring the caliphate, he had a massive palace complex, known as the Medina Azahara, built about seven kilometres west of Córdoba. The Medina Azahara was modelled after the old Umayyad palace in Damascus and served as a symbolic tie between the new caliph and his ancestors. It was said that Córdoba contained 3000 mosques and 100,000 shops and homes during his reign.

Under his reign, Córdoba became the most important intellectual centre of Western Europe. He expanded the city's library, which would be further enriched by his successors.

He also reinforced the Iberian fleet, which became the most powerful in Mediterranean Europe. Iberian raiders moved up to Galicia, Asturias, and North Africa. The colonisers of Fraxinetum came from al-Andalus as well.

Due to his consolidation of power, Muslim Iberia became a power for a few centuries. It also brought prosperity, and with this he created mints where pure gold and silver coins were created. He renovated and added to the Mosque–Cathedral of Córdoba.

He was very wary of losing control and kept tight reins on his family. In 949, he executed one of his sons for conspiring against him. He was tolerant of non-Muslims, and Jews and Christians were treated fairly provided they were not one of his caliphate's slaves, sexual or otherwise. European kingdoms sent emissaries, including from Otto I of Germany and the Byzantine emperor.

== Ancestry ==
Abd al-Rahman III's mother Muzna was a Christian captive, possibly from the Pyrenean region. His paternal grandmother Onneca Fortúnez was a Christian princess from the Kingdom of Pamplona. In his immediate ancestry, Abd al-Rahman III was Arab and Hispano–Basque.

Ancestors of Abd al-Rahman III

8. Muhammad I, Emir of Córdoba
4. Abdullah, Emir of Córdoba
9. Baher
2. Muhammad
10. Fortún Garcés, King of Pamplona
5. Onneca Fortúnez (Durr)
11. Oria
1. Abd al-Rahman III, Caliph of Córdoba
3. Muzna (originally Maria)

== Bibliography ==
- Coope, Jessica (1995). Martyrs of Córdoba: Community and Family Conflict in an Age of Mass Conversion. Lincoln: University of Nebraska Press. ISBN 0-8032-1471-5.
- Fierro, Maribel (2005). Abd-al-Rahman III of Córdoba. Oxford: Oneworld Publications. ISBN 1-85168-384-4.
- Ibn Idhari (1860) [Composed c. 1312]. Al-Bayan al-Mughrib [History of Al-Andalus from Spanish] (in Spanish). Vol. 1. translated by Francisco Fernández y González. Granada: Francisco Ventura y Sabatel. OCLC 557028856.
- Lane-Poole, Stanley (1894). The Mohammedan Dynasties: Chronological and Genealogical Tables with Historical Introductions. Westminster: Archibald Constable and Company. OCLC 1199708.
- Lévi-Provençal, Évariste; García Gómez, Emilio, eds. (1950). Una crónica anónima de 'Abd al-Rahman III al-Nasir (in Spanish). Madrid-Granada: Instituto Miguel Asin.
- Scales, Peter (1994). Fall of the Caliphate of Córdoba. New York: EJ Brill. ISBN 90-04-09868-2.
- Wolf, Kenneth (1988). Christian Martyrs in Muslim Spain. Cambridge: Cambridge University Press. ISBN 0-521-34416-6.
- Gordon, Matthew (2005). "Document 15: Abd al-Rahman III of al-Andalus". The Rise of Islam. Greenwood guides to historic events of the medieval world. Westport, Connecticut: Greenwood Publishing Group. ISBN 978-0-313-32522-9.

Abd al-Rahman III Banu Umayyah Cadet branch of the Banu Quraish
| Preceded by Abdallah ibn Muhammad | Emir of Córdoba; 912–929 | Became caliph |
| New title Caliphate of Córdoba created | Caliph of Córdoba; 929–961 | Succeeded by Al-Hakam II |
