= Abdullah of Córdoba =

Emir of Córdoba from 888 to 912

Abdullah ibn Muhammad عبد الله بن محمد الأموي
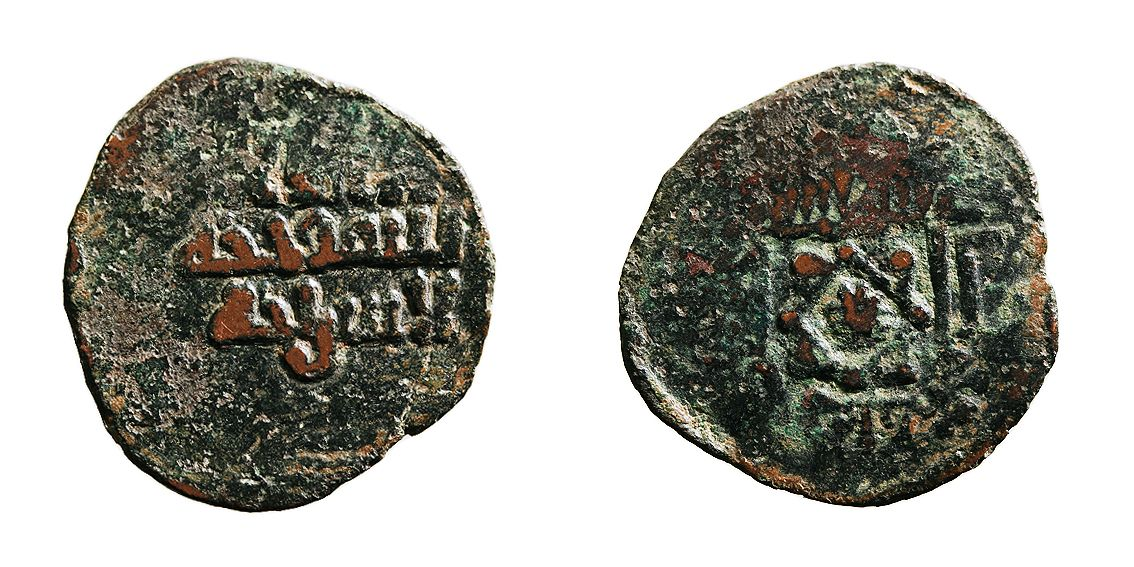
- A coin under his rule

7th Emir of Córdoba
- Reign: 888 — 912
- Predecessor: Al-Mundhir
- Successor: Abd al-Rahman III
- Born: 844; Córdoba
- Died: 912 (aged 67–68); Córdoba
- Dynasty: Umayyad (Marwanid)
- Father: Muhammad I
- Mother: Ashar
- Religion: Islam

Abd Allah ibn Muhammad ibn Abd al-Rahman (Arabic: عبد الله بن محمد بن عبد الرحمن; 844 – 912) was the seventh emir of Córdoba, reigning from 888 to 912 in Al-Andalus (Islamic Iberia).

== Biography ==
Contemporary historians accused Abdullah of orchestrating the death of his half-brother, al-Mundhir, whereby he ascended to power.

The most formidable threat for the emir was Umar ibn Hafsun, who had conquered the provinces of Reyyo (including Bobastro), Elvira (including Granada) and Jaén, and had allied with the populations of Archidona, Baeza, Úbeda and Priego. In 891 Ibn Hafsun was defeated near the castle of Polei and lost several cities. However, by the following year Ibn Hafsun had already recovered, and reconquered all the lost territories.

In 911, the emir signed a peace agreement with Ibn Hafsun. However, the war broke out again the following year, only to be halted by the death of Abdullah at Córdoba, who was improving his positions. He was succeeded by his grandson, Abd al-Rahman III.

== Family ==
Abdullah was the son of Muhammad I and the younger brother of al-Mundhir.

Around 863, Abdullah married Onneca Fortúnez, daughter of Fortún Garcés, King of Pamplona and his wife Aurea (Orea). She was repudiated sometime before 880 and returned to the Kingdom of Pamplona, most probably with her father who returned that year, and took her cousin Aznar Sánchez of Larraun as her second husband with whom she had at least three children, including Queen Toda of Navarre who was, therefore, the aunt of Abd al-Rahman III.

Abdullah had several children:

- Muhammed ibn Abd Allah (864 – 28 Jan 891). Recorded to be a son of Onneca. He was murdered by his brother al-Mutarrif (with the approval of their father). He married a Basque or Frankish woman named Muzna. They were the parents of Abd al-Rahman III who was born three weeks after his father's death.
- al-Mutarrif, murdered in 895 after being accused of conspiracy.
- Aban
- al-Asi, executed in 921 after being accused of conspiracy.

== Sources ==
- Altamira, Rafael (1999). "Il califfato occidentale". Storia del mondo medievale. Vol. II. pp. 477–515.
- Kosto, Adam J. (2017). "Aragon and the Catalan Counties Before the Union". In Sabaté, Flocel (ed.). The Crown of Aragon: A Singular Mediterranean Empire. Brill. pp. 70–91.
- Lacarra y de Miguel, José María (1945). "Textos navarros del Códice de Roda" (PDF). Estudios de la Edad Media de la Corona de Aragón (in Spanish). No. 58–59. Zaragoza. pp. 193–284. ISSN 0032-8472. OCLC 500338136. Archived from the original (PDF) on 2016-03-03.
- Lévi-Provençal, Évariste (1953). "Du nouveau sur le royaume de Pampelune au IXe siècle". Bulletin Hispanique (in French). Vol. 55, no. 1. Université de Bordeaux. pp. 5–22. ISSN 0007-4640.
- Martínez Díez, Gonzalo (2005). El Condado de Castilla (711-1038): la historia frente a la leyenda (in Spanish). Valladolid. ISBN 84-9718-275-8.

Abdullah of Córdoba Banu Umayyah Cadet branch of the Banu Quraish
Preceded by al-Mundhir	Emir of Córdoba; 888–912	Succeeded by Abd al-Rahman III
