= Banu Khalaf =

Ruling family in Barbitania

The Banu Khalaf was an Arab family that ruled Huesca and the region called Barbitanya on the Iberian Peninsula from about 802 to 862, and Barbitanya alone from 862 to about 882.

The first ruler was Khalaf Ibn Rashid (802), who settled with his clan in the village they named Midayar, modern Barbastro. The city castle (Barbastra) was the centre of the Muslim domain in the region.

Khalaf died before 862. In this year the government of Huesca was conferred on the Banu Qasi family. His son Abd Allah ibn Khalaf then ruled Barbitanya. In the 870s, he allied himself with rebel Isma'il ibn Musa al-Qasawi, to whom Abd Allah married his daughter. In retaliation, at the end of the decade Muhammad I of Córdoba entered Huesca and killed Abd Allah and all of his children, and took possession of the Banu Jalaf lands.

== Bibliography ==
- Al-Udri: Tarsi al-ajbar wa-tanwi al-atar wa-l-bustan. Ed. by Fernando de La Granja: La marca superior en la obra de Al-Udri. Estudios de la Edad Media de la Corona de Aragón, VIII (1967), pp. 457–461.
