= Siege of Toledo (930–932) =

Siege of Toledo (930–32)
- Part of Reconquista
- Iberian Pepinsula c. 910
Date	May 930 – June 932
Location	Toledo, Spain
Result	Córdoban victory

Belligerents
Caliphate of Córdoba	Toledo rebels Kingdom of León

Commanders and leaders
Abd al-Rahman III; Sa'eed bin Mundhir	Tha'laba bin Muhammad; Ramiro II of León

Casualties and losses
Unknown	Unknown

The siege of Toledo was launched by the Córdoban caliph, Abdulrahman III, against the rebellious city of Toledo in May 930. The siege lasted for two years and finally fell to the Caliph in June 932.

== Siege ==
Following the death of the Leonese monarch, Ordoño II, in 924, Fruela took over as king; however, his reign was brief as he was succeeded by Alfonso IV of León, who fought two civil wars against his brothers, Sancho Ordóñez and Ramiro. Ramiro defeated Alfonso. The former assumed the name "Ramiro II." Ramiro started to renew the war with the Moors. Ramiro realized that the Moors needed to be distracted by internal conflicts and civil wars to weaken them.

Ramiro took advantage of Toledo's growing signs of rebellion and dispatched his spies to incite the city to rebel against the caliph. When the Caliph realized this, he issued commands to the city, demanding that they acknowledge his authority, but the city refused. The caliph gave Sa'eed bin Mundhir, his vizier, the order to besiege the city. After coming to join him in May 930, the caliph started destroying the city's suburbs and chopping off its trees. Subsequently, the caliph departed the city, leaving the siege to his vizier.

The city resisted for two years; however, realizing they wouldn't last long, the rebels sent Ramiro a message pleading for assistance. Answering their call, Ramiro departed for Toledo on March 932. He was able to take control of Madrid's fort while marching. Ramiro then dispatched a detachment to relieve the city, but they were routed before they could enter the city by the Córdoban forces. Seeing that there was nothing he could do, Ramiro decided to let the city suffer its fate. In June, the Caliph returned to the city and launched a full-scale siege.

The rebels lost hope and decided to surrender to the caliph. The rebel leader, Tha'laba bin Muhammad, asked the caliph for amnesty, to which he agreed. Thus allowing Abdulrahman to consolidate his power as the ruler of Andalusia. The walls of the city were demolished.

== Sources ==
- Muhammad Abdullah Enan, The State of Islam in Andalusia, Vol. I: The Era of Abdulrahman al-Nasir.
- Ibn 'Idhari, Al-Bayan al-Mughrib, Vol II.
- Warren Hasty Carroll, The Building of Christendom.
- Reinhart Pieter Anne Dozy & Francis Griffin Stokes (jr.), Spanish Islam: A History of the Moslems in Spain.
- Abdul Fattah al-Fathi, History and historians in Egypt and Andalusia In the fourth century AH, tenth century AD: A comparative analytical study, Volume 1.
