= Umar ibn Hafsun =

Al-Andalusian rebel political and military leader (c. 850 – 917)

Umar ibn Hafsun ibn Ja'far ibn Salim (Arabic: عُمَر بْن حَفْصُون بْن جَعْفَ بْن سالِم) (c. 850 – 917), known in Spanish history as Omar ben Hafsun, was a 9th-century political and military leader who contested Umayyad power in Iberia.

== Ancestry ==
Andalusi rebels of Umar ibn Hafsun fighting against the Emirate of Cordoba, by Joan Serra y Pausas, c. 1888–92.

The background of Ibn Hafsun has been the subject of conflicting claims. A contemporary poet, Ibn Abd Rabbih (860–940), referred to him as a Sawada, a descendant of black Africans. Writing a century later, Ibn Hayyan recorded a pedigree for Ibn Hafsun by tracing his descent to a great-grandfather, Ja'far ibn Salim, who had converted to Islam and settled in the Ronda area of the Province of Málaga in southern Spain. The pedigree then traces back several additional generations to one Count Marcellus (or perhaps Frugelo), son of Alfonso, apparently a Christian Visigoth. This pedigree was copied by later historians, including Ibn Idhari, Ibn Khatib, and Ibn Khaldun, as well as the A'lam Malaga (History of Malaga) begun by Ibn 'Askar and completed by Ibn Khamis, and more recent authors such as Reinhart Dozy, in his Histoire des Mussulmans d'Espagne (History of the Muslims of Spain). However, historian David J. Wasserstein has concluded that the pre-conversion portion of this pedigree was probably invented by Umar himself. José Antonio Conde in 1820 wrote that Ibn Hafsun was "a man of pagan origin, of obscure and unknown ancestry." Regardless, there is evidence his family owned lands in Iznate, Málaga, where he grew up.

== Life ==
Ibn Hafsun was born around 850 in the mountains near Parauta in what is now Málaga. In his youth, he had a very violent temper and was involved in a number of disputes, including a homicide around the year 879. He joined a group of brigands and was captured by the Vali of Málaga, who merely imposed a fine since he had not been informed of the homicide. The governor subsequently lost his post. Ibn Hafsun fled the jurisdiction to Morocco where he worked briefly as an apprentice tailor.

He soon returned to al-Andalus as an outlaw and joined bandits who were in rebellion against Andalusian rule and soon rose to a leadership position. Originally he settled in the ruins of the old castle of Bobastro (Arabic: بُبَشْتَر bubastar). He rebuilt the castle, and fortified the nearby town of Ardales. He rallied disaffected Muwallads and Mozarabs to the cause by playing off resentment towards the taxation levels imposed by and the treatment they were receiving at the hands of the Emirate of Córdoba. He acquired castles and lands in a wide area not only in Malaga but also in portions of the Provinces of Cádiz, Elvira, Jaén, and Seville.

By 883, he had become the leader of the rebels in the provinces to the south and the west of the Emirate of Córdoba. The year before, in 882, he is said to have fought the Emir in a battle in which his ally, García Íñiguez of Pamplona, was killed. Around 885, to be more centrally located so that he could more quickly respond to external threats, Ibn Hafsun moved his headquarters to the town of Poley, which is now Aguilar de la Frontera.

After Ibn Hafsun’s defeat by the forces of Abdullah ibn Muhammad al-Umawi at the Battle of Poley in 891, he moved his headquarters back to Bobastro. In 898, Lubb ibn Muhammad, of the Banu Qasi, was marching an army to support Umar when the death of his father at Zaragoza forced Lubb to abandon the campaign. In 899, Ibn Hafsun renounced Islam and converted to Christianity. He was baptised as Samuel. His motivations seems to have been opportunistic in the hope of obtaining military support from Alfonso III of Asturias, who had met overtures by Ibn Hafsun on behalf of Ibn Marwan with indifference. The conversion attracted him significant Mozarab support but cost him the support of most of his Mullawad followers. He also built the Iglesia Mozárabe ("Mozarab Church") at the Bobastro.

Ibn Hafsun continued to be a serious threat to Córdoba. In 910, he offered allegiance to the newly established Fatimid Caliphate of North Africa, and when Abd al-Rahman III became Emir of Cordoba in 912, he instigated a policy of annual spring offensives against Ibn Hafsun by using mercenary troops. In 913 Abd ar-Rahman recaptured the city of Seville, and by the end of 914, he had captured 70 of Ibn Hafsun’s castles. In 916, Ibn Hafsun joined forces with the Umayyads in a campaign against northern Christian kingdoms for an as of yet unknown reason, whether in contrition or merely as an expedient compromise. For a while, even taxes were paid to the Umayyads.

Ibn Hafsun died in 917 and was buried in the Iglesia Mozarabe. His coalition then crumbled; while his sons Ja'far, 'Abd-ar-Rahman and Hafs tried to continue the resistance, they eventually fell to 'Abd-ar-Rahman III. Hafs surrendered Bobastro in 928 and fought with the Umayyad army in Galicia. With Bobastro's fall, the mortal remains of Ibn Hafsun and his slain sons were exhumed by the emir and posthumously crucified outside the Mosque–Cathedral of Córdoba.
