= Kitab al-Anwa' =

Kitāb al-Anwāʾ (كتاب الانواء) is a title given to a number of works from eastern and western parts of Arab civilization that concern astronomy, weather and agriculture. There is no proven relation between the different works of this title: the Kitāb al-Anwāʾ by Abu Hanifa Dinawari of Iran, for example, was written more than a century earlier than the Kitāb al-Anwāʾ by ʿArīb ibn Saʿīd al-Qurṭūbī of Córdoba (d. 980 CE). This latter, however, was a particularly influential example of the form and was adapted and translated several times.

== Origins and contents ==
ʿArīb ibn Saʿīd was a physician and scholar associated with the Córdoban Umayyad court of ʿAbd al-Raḥmān III. He based the Kitāb al-Anwāʾ on eastern-style calendars such as the Kitāb al-Azmina by Ibn Māsawayh (d. 857). Ibn Saʿīd finished this work in 973 and is principally attested today in the manuscript Tehran, Malik Millī, MS 2049.

The work contains discourses on meteorological and astronomical topics, including astronomical tables, discussion of bodily health and hygiene, agricultural treatises and calendars. It describes a curious meteorological forecasting system based on the position of the sun and the hiding of certain stars, associating these positions with certain repetitive phenomena experienced at that time.

In the assessment of Miquel Forcada, 'the author also includes materials from everyday life, thus providing an invaluable documentary record of his times.'

== Adaptations ==
=== Calendar of Córdoba ===
ʿArīb ibn Saʿīd's work was adapted, in Córdoba, under the title Kitāb fī tafṣīl al-zamān wa-maṣāliḥ al-abdān, a text that has been known in English as The Calendar of Córdoba since the name was Europeanised by its first modern editor, Reinhart Dozy, in his 1873 edition. This was composed in the tenth century CE, after the completion of ʿArīb ibn Saʿīd's work in 973. The Calendar of Córdoba differs from the Kitāb al-Anwāʾ in being greatly simplified, while including more information specific to Christian ritual, principally by listing the feasts and Mozarab saints associated with each day of the calendar.

The Calendar survives in the manuscripts Paris, Bibliothèque Nationale de France, MS Héb. 1082 (Arabic in Hebrew script) and MS Ar. 2521 (Arabic).

The Calendar of Córdoba was twice translated into Latin during the Middle Ages. The earlier of the two is very literal, at times to the point of incomprehensibility, but adds further information relating to the Christian community of Córdoba and its hinterland. This is entitled Liber Anoe (taking its title from the source-text of the Calendar, the Kitāb al-Anwāʾ It may be by the Christian bishop Rabīʿ b. Zayd, who, like ʿArīb b. Saʿīd, was associated with the Umayyad court at Córdoba, has been posited as the translator. It was once attributed to Gerard of Cremona (d. 1187). This translation survives in the manuscripts Madrid, Biblioteca Nacional de España, MS 6036 and Berlin, Staatsbibliothek, MS Lat. Qu. 198.

The second Latin translation is from the thirteenth century. It survives in the manuscript Barcelona, Museu Episcopal, MS Vic 167.

=== Other adaptations ===
The Kitāb al-Anwāʾ was also the source of the anonymous, Andalusian text Risāla fī awqāt al-sana, found in Rabat, al-Ḥasaniyya, MS 6699, and of the as yet unedited Tafṣīl al-azmān wa-maṣāliḥ al-abdān found in the manuscript Alexandria, al-Baladiyya, MS 2918.

== See also ==
- Al-Naḍr ibn Shumayl (d. 820) also wrote a Kitāb al-Anwāʾ

== Editions and translations ==
- Charles Pellat (ed.), Le calendrier de Cordoue publié par R. Dozy. Nouvelle edition accompagnee d'une traduction française annotée (Leiden: Brill 1961) [first published as Dozy, Reinhart P. A., Le calendrier de Cordoue: de l'année 961; texte arabe et ancienne traduction Latine (Leiden: Brill, 1873)]
- José Martínez Gázquez and Julio Samsó (trans.), 'Una nueva traducción latina del Calendario de Córdoba (siglo XIII)', in Textos y estudios sobre astronomía española en el siglo XIII, trans. by Juan Vernet (Barcelona 1981), pp. 9–78
- José Martínez Gázquez, El texto del Calendario de Córdoba en el manuscrito Berlín Lat. Qu. 198, in Studia in honorem prof. M. de Riquer (Barcelona 1991), 4:657–68 (from Berlin, Staatsbibliothek, MS Lat. Qu. 198).
- Daniel Varisco, “The Anwāʾ Stars According to Abū Isḥāq al-Zajjāj.” Zeitschrift für Geschichte der Arabisch-Islamischen Wissenschaften (1989).
