= Bobastro =

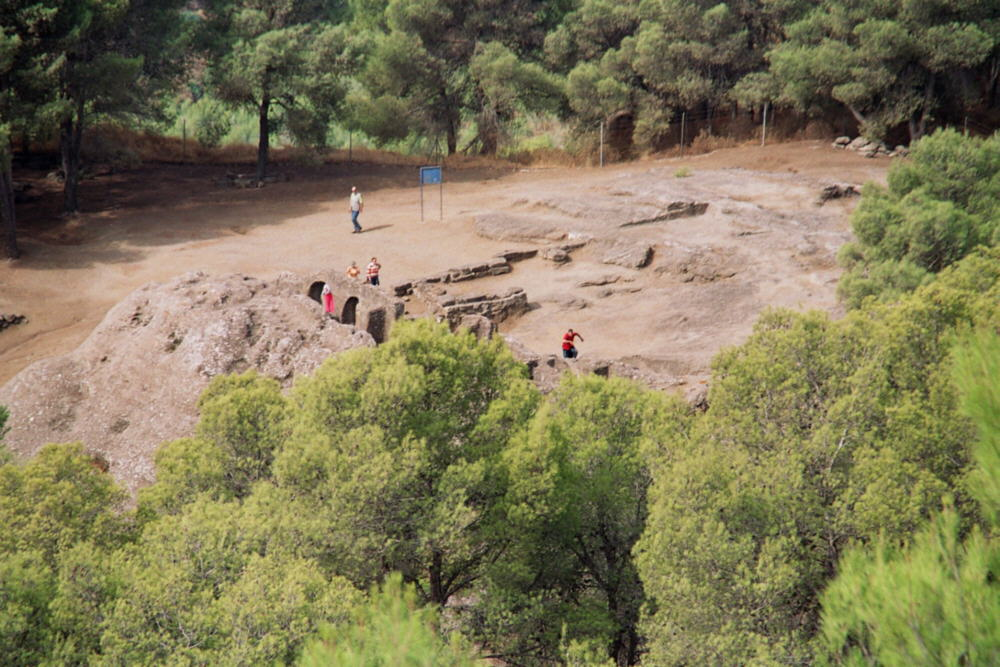
- Ruins of the Bobastro Church

Site information
- Type: Castle
- Condition: Ruins

Location
- Location within Andalusia Location within Spain
- Coordinates: 36°54′9.01″N 4°46′53.35″W

Bobastro (Arabic: ببشتر, romanized: Bubashtar) was a castle of Roman origin, rebuilt as the headquarters of Umar ibn Hafsun during his rebellion against the Caliphate of Córdoba in the 9th century. Its ruins lie in the Province of Málaga, Spain.

There had been a structure at the site since Roman times. In 880 AD, Umar ibn Hafsun settled in the ruins of the old castle of Bobastro near Ardales, in which he incited the Muwallads and Mozarabs to join his cause against the unfair, heavy taxation and humiliating treatment they were receiving at the hands of Muhammad I and his successors. In 888, Al-Mundhir of Córdoba was murdered at Bobastro by his brother Abdullah ibn Muhammad al-Umawi, who later succeeded him. The rebels constructed a church within the castle which lasted until the end of their autonomy on January 19, 928.

The castle was still in use in 1147, but by the 13th century it was in ruins.
