= Reinhart Dozy =

Dutch orientalist (1820–1883)

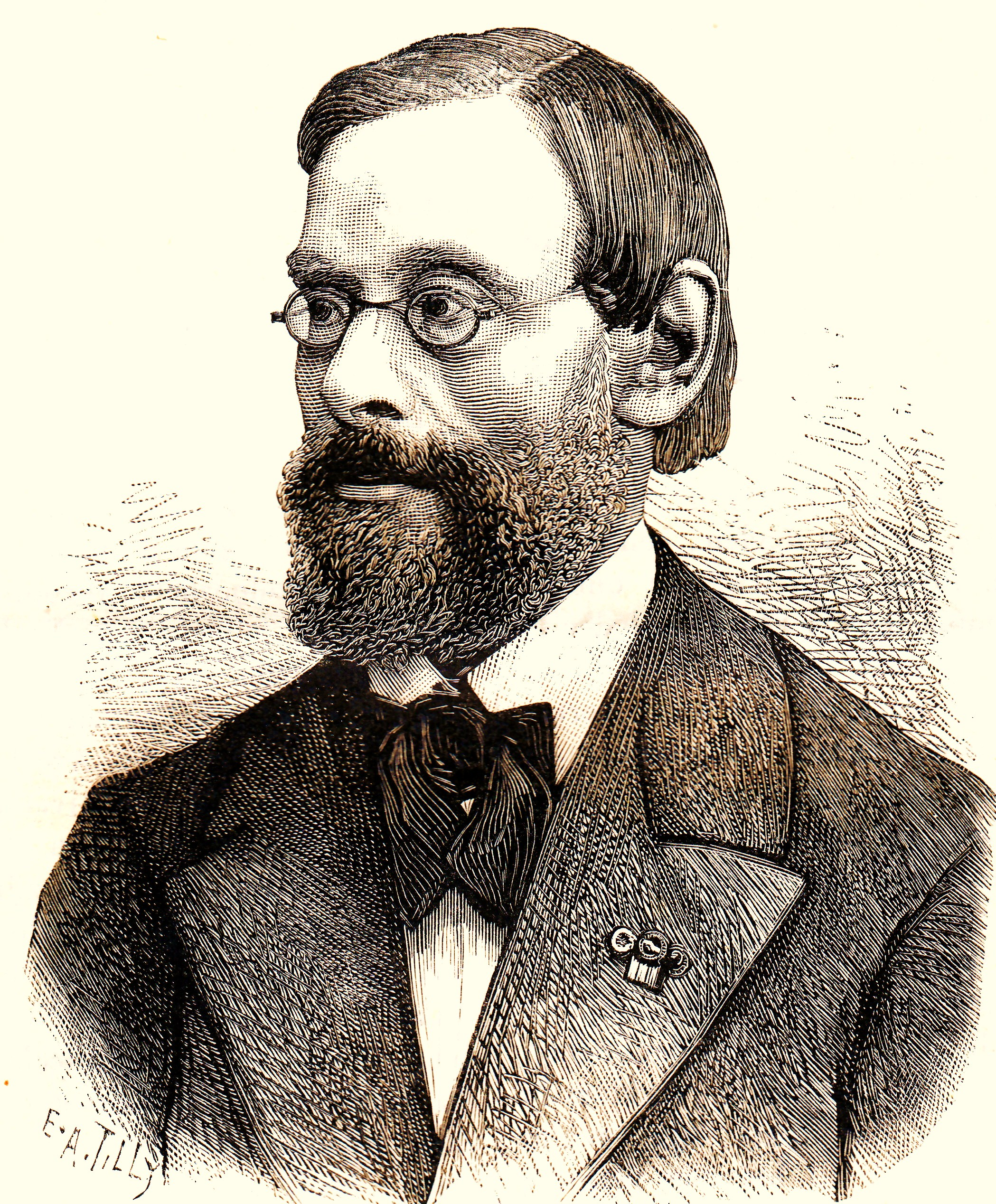
Reinhart Pieter Anne Dozy

Reinhart Pieter Anne Dozy (21 February 1820 – 29 April 1883) was a Dutch scholar of French (Huguenot) origin. He was an Orientalist scholar of Arabic language, history and literature.

== Biography ==
Reinhart Pieter Anne Dozy was born on 21 February 1820 in Leiden, Netherlands. The Dozys, like other contemporary French families, emigrated to the Low Countries after the revocation of the edict of Nantes, but some of the former appear to have settled in the Netherlands as early as 1647. Dozy studied at the University of Leiden, obtained the degree of doctor in 1844, was appointed an extraordinary professor of history in 1850, and professor in 1857. Dozy was a correspondent of the Royal Institute between 1848 and 1851. He became a member of the successor institute, the Royal Netherlands Academy of Arts and Sciences, in 1855.

Dozy died in Leiden on 29 April 1883.

== Works ==
In 1847 Reinhart Dozy's extensive studies in Oriental literature, Arabic language and history, resulted in his first publication, The History of the Almohads, preceded by a Sketch of the History of Spain from the time of the conquest till the reign of Yusuf ibn Tashfin, and of the history of the Almoravids. This translation of an original thirteenth century Arabic history, titled "Kitab al-mujib fi talkhis akhbar ahl al-Maghrib" (Book of Response: A Short History of the Maghreb) by the Almohad historian Abdelwahid al-Marrakushi, was reprinted in 1881 and 1968. Al-Marrakushi (b.1185) had lived nine years in Al-Andalus (present-day southern Spain) from 1206-1215. He had visited Egypt and Mecca in 1221, and returned to Morocco to complete his book in 1224.

Other works include:

- Scriptorum Arabum loci de Abbaditis (1846–1863, 3 vols.),
- His edition of 13th century Marrakesh historian Ibn Idhari's History of Africa and Spain (1848–1852, 3 vols.), translation of a Leiden library manuscript purchased at Morocco in the 17th century titled Al-Bayan al-Mughrib.
- Of Ibn-Badrun's Historical Commentary on the Poem of Abd al-Majid ibn Abdun (1848), and
- His Dictionnaire détaillé des noms des vêtements chez les Arabes (1845), a work crowned by the Dutch Institute.
- Spanish Islam, A History of the Moslems in Spain (1913). Publ. Chatto & Windus
- Histoire des Musulmans d'Espagne, jusqu'à la conquête de l'Andalousie par les Almoravides, 711-1110 (4 vols. 1861; 2nd ed. 1881) read, a graphically written account of Moorish dominion in Spain, which shed new light on many obscure points.
- Recherches sur l'histoire politique et littéraire de l'Espagne pendant le moyen âge (2 vols. 1849; 2nd ed. completely recast in 1860 as Recherches sur l'histoire et la littérature de l'Espagne pendant le moyen âge; 3rd ed. 1881) form a supplement to his Histoire des Musulmans, in which he exposes the many tricks and falsehoods of the monks in their chronicles, and effectively demolishes a good part of the Cid legends.
- Supplément aux dictionnaires arabes (1877–1881, 2 volumes) and
- Glossaire des mots espagnols et portugais, dérivés de l'arabe, edited with W. H. Engelmann of Leipzig (1861; 2nd ed., 1869), and a similar list of Dutch words derived from the Arabic.

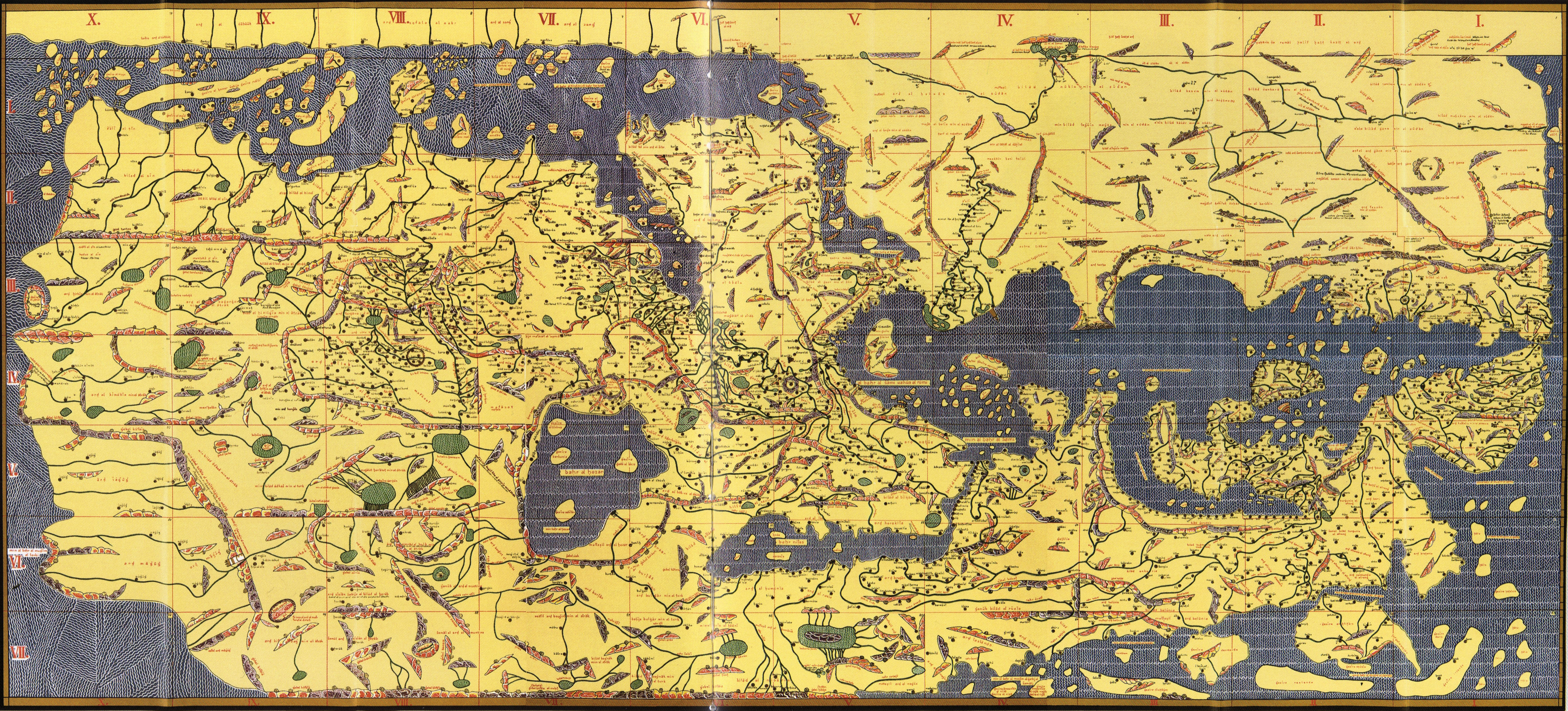
Tabula Rogeriana, for king Roger II of Sicily, circa 1154, by Muhammad al Idris. Notice the sketches of the Black Sea, Spain, Italy, the Red Sea and the Caspian Sea towards the lower part of the map

Works Edited by Dozy:

- Ahmed Mohammed al-Maqqari's Analectes sur l'histoire et la littérature des Arabes d'Espagne (1855–1861, 2 vols.), and, in conjunction with his friend and successor, Michael Jan de Goeje, at Leiden:
- al-Idrisi's Description de l'Afrique et de l'Espagne (1866).
- Calendrier de Cordoue de l'année 961; texte arabe et ancienne traduction latine (Leiden 1873).
- Het Islamisme (Islamism; 1863, 2nd ed., 1880; French translation) is a popular exposition of Islam, of a more controversial character; and
- De Israelieten te Mekka ("The Israelites at Mecca", 1864) became the subject of a rather heated discussion in Jewish circles.

== Assessment ==
According to Edward Said, despite the "enormous labors" represented by Dozy's work, it was characterized by an "impressive antipathy [...] to the Orient, Islam, and the Arabs".
