= Battle of Valdejunquera =

Battle of the Reconquista in 920 AD

- Part of the Reconquista
- Iberian Pepinsula c. 910
Date	26 July 920
Location	Iuncaria Valley near Muez in Navarre
Result	Cordoban victory

Belligerents
Kingdom of Pamplona; Kingdom of León	Emirate of Córdoba

Commanders and leaders
Sancho Garcés I Ordoño II of León	Abd al-Rahman III

The Battle of Valdejunquera took place in a valley called Iuncaria (Spanish: val de Junquera) on 26 July 920 between the Islamic Emirate of Córdoba and the Christian armies of the kingdoms of León and Pamplona. The battle, a victory for the Córdobans, was part of the "Campaign of Muez" (Campaña de Muez), which was directed primarily against León's southern line of defence, the County of Castile along the Duero river.

The earliest reference to the battle is found in the Chronicon of Sampiro, a Leonese cleric writing probably in the late 980s. According to Sampiro, the "Agarenes" (descendants of Hagar, i.e. the Muslims) arrived at Mois (Muez), threatening the Kingdom of Pamplona, whose king, Sancho Garcés I requested the aid of Ordoño II of León. The Leonese king encountered the Muslims—whom we know from other sources to have been under the command of their emir, Abd al-Rahman III—in the Valdejunquera and was routed. Two of his bishops, Dulcidio and Ermogio, were taken captive to Córdoba. In exchange for his uncle's freedom, Ermogio's nephew Pelagius, later a martyr, went into captivity instead, while Ordoño ransomed Dulcidio. As a further result of the battle, the fortified site of Clunia, which had been repopulated by the Castilian count Gonzalo Fernández in 912, had to be abandoned. It was in Muslim hands as late as 1007–10.

The exact location of Valdejunquera is unknown. The seventeenth-century Navarrese historian José de Moret located it north of Irujo and south of the sierra of Andía. He claimed that even in his day the Basques called the region "Iuncadia" in their language. The late eleventh-century Historia Silense placed the battle in the territory of Sancho Garcés, somewhere between Estella and Pamplona.

The assignment of the bishops Dulcidio and Ermogio to known dioceses has also been problematic. While Sampiro's continuator, Pelayo of Oviedo, writing in the twelfth century, believed them to be bishops of Salamanca and Tuy, respectively, neither is possible. In 920 the see of Salamanca lay in the depopulated "Desert of the Duero" and that of Tuy had as its bishop a certain Nausto. In studying the texts of Sampiro and Pelayo, historian Justo Pérez de Urbel concluded that Dulcidio was Bishop of Zamora and Ermogio of Oporto, but with roots in the region of Tuy.
