= Al-Mundhir of Córdoba =

Emir of Córdoba from 886 to 888

Al-Mundhir المنذر بن محمد بن عبدالرحمن

6th Emir of Córdoba
- Reign: 886 — 888
- Predecessor: Muhammad I
- Successor: Abdullah ibn Muhammad
- Born: 842; Córdoba
- Died: 888 (aged 45–46); Bobastro
- Dynasty: Umayyad (Marwanid)
- Father: Muhammad I
- Mother: Athel

Al-Mundhir (Arabic: المنذر بن محمد بن عبدالرحمن; c. 842 – 888) was Emir of Córdoba from 886 to 888. He was a member of the Umayyad dynasty of Al-Andalus (Moorish Iberia), the son of Muhamad bin Abd al-Rahman.

== Biography ==
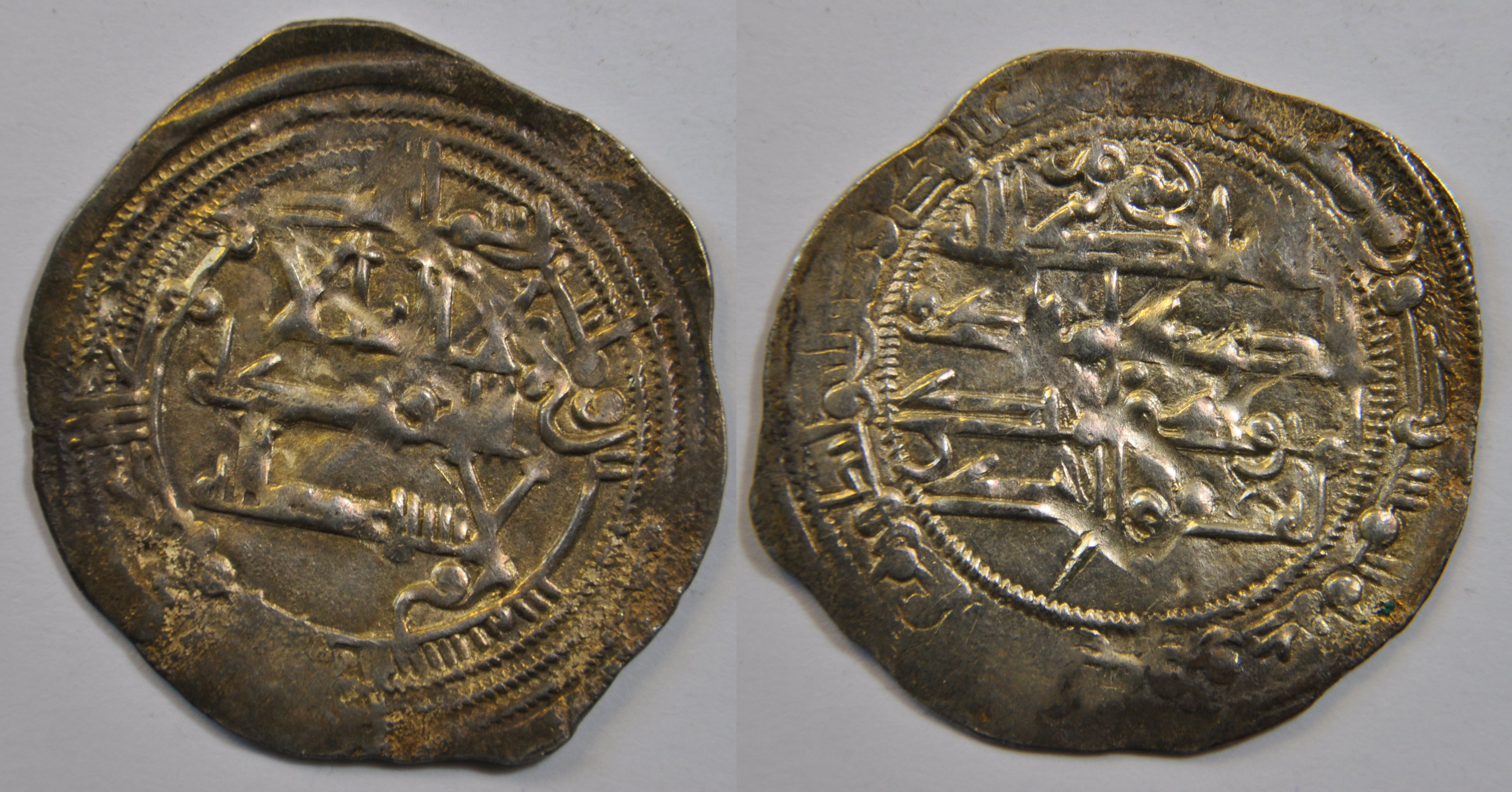
Dirham of his father Muhammad I (r. 852–886)

Born in Córdoba, during the reign of his father he commanded the military operations against the neighbouring Christian kingdoms and the Muwallad rebellions.

In 865 he led the partially failed campaign against King Ordoño I of Asturias, in the Duero valley. On his way back to Córdoba, he defeated Rodrigo, count of Castile, at Burgos, pushing the Cordoban frontier northwards. He also tried to conquer León, but he was defeated in 878 at Valdemora, by king Alfonso III of Asturias.

Al-Mundhir launched an expedition against the Banu Qasi Muwallad family, who had allied with Alfonso III, but was again defeated in 883. The following year he was, however, able to expel the rebel emir Ibn Marwan from Badajoz.

In 886, upon his father's death, he inherited the throne of Córdoba. During the two years of his reign al-Mundhir continued the fight against the rebel Umar ibn Hafsun. He died in 888 at Bobastro, possibly murdered by his brother Abdullah ibn Muhammad al-Umawi, who succeeded him.

== Sources ==
- Altamira, Rafael (1999). "Il califfato occidentale". Storia del mondo medievale. Vol. II. pp. 477–515.

Al-Mundhir of Córdoba Banu Umayyah Cadet branch of the Banu Quraish
Preceded by Muhammad I	Emir of Córdoba; 886–888	Succeeded by Abdullah
