= Villanázar =

Coordinates: 41°59′N 5°47′W

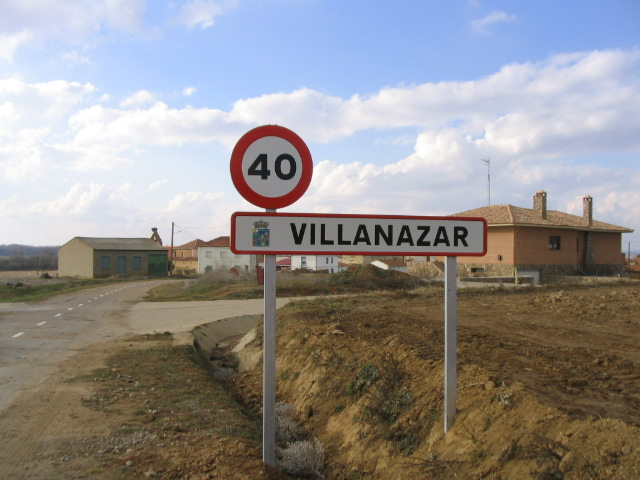
- Country: Spain
- Autonomous community: Castile and León
- Province: Zamora
- Municipality: Villanázar

Area
  - Total: 18 km^{2} (6.9 sq mi)

Population (2025-01-01)
  - Total: 256
  - Density: 14/km^{2} (37/sq mi)
- Time zone: UTC+1 (CET)
  - Summer (DST): UTC+2 (CEST)
- Website: Official website

Villanázar is a municipality located in the province of Zamora, Castile and León, Spain. According to the 2004 census (INE), the municipality has a population of 364 inhabitants.
