= Al-Bayan al-Mughrib =

1312 history book by Ibn 'Idhari

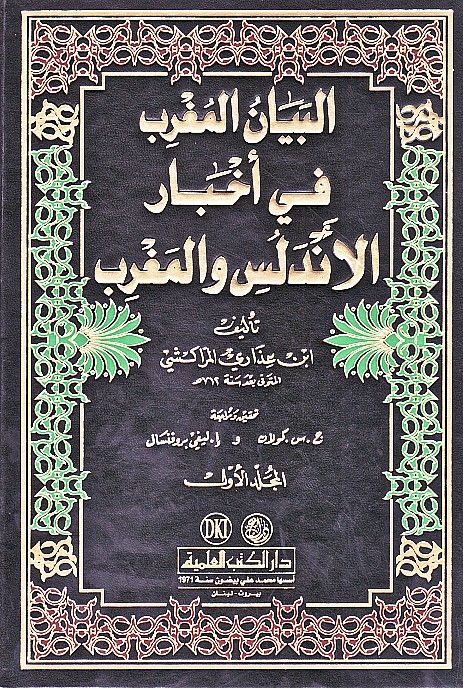
Cover image of the book: Al-Bayan Al-Mughrib fi Ikhtisar Akhbar Muluk Al-Andalus wa Al-Maghrib. Written by: Ibn 'Idhari Al-Marrakushi

Kitāb al-bayān al-mughrib fī ākhbār mulūk al-andalus wa'l-maghrib (Book of the Amazing Story of the History of the Kings of al-Andalus and Maghreb) by Ibn 'Idhari of Marrakesh, Morocco; an important medieval Arabic history of the Maghreb and Iberia, written at Marrakesh c. 1312 / 712 AH . Generally known by its shorter title al-Bayān al-Mughrib (The Amazing Story; البيان المغرب), or even just as the Bayān, it is valued by modern researchers as a unique source of information, and for its preservation of excerpts from lost works.

Ibn 'Idhari divides the work into three parts:

- History of the Maghreb from the coming of Islam to the twelfth century
- History of Al-Andalus (Muslim Iberia) over the same period
- History of the Almoravids and Almohads

The Arabic text of the first two parts was first published in a Latin edition by Reinhart Dozy (1848–52); a second corrected edition of these two parts was published in 1948 by Colin and Levi-Provençal.

Several Spanish translations include a notable version by Ambrosio Huici Miranda, who originally published a part of the text as an anonymous work based on manuscripts from Madrid and Copenhagen and later the full text under Ibn 'Idhari's name. A French translation by Fagnan (1901) based on Dozy's edition, received unfavourable reviews. However to date few translations of this work have been published.

Portions of the incomplete and insect-damaged manuscript of the third part were discovered in the 20th century. Despite lacking the beginning and end and several folios, the preserved MS fragments importantly provide for the correction of many of errors and information omitted by the more widely known Rawd al-Qirtas. An Arabic edition published by Ihsan Abbas (Beirut, 1983) includes the incomplete Part 3.
