= Auria =

Queen consort of Pamplona

Auria—also known as Oria—was an early consort of Pamplona. She is known from a single historical source, the Códice de Roda, which only gives her name and not her parentage. Historian and professor Antonio Rei has put forward the hypothesis that she could have been the granddaughter of Musa ibn Musa al-Qasawi, while genealogist Christian Settipani suggested this and two other alternatives when addressing her possible parentage.

== Marriage and issue ==
She married King Fortún Garcés of Pamplona, who died in 922.

These are the children of Auria and Fortún:

- Íñigo Fortúnez
- Aznar Fortúnez
- Velasco Fortúnez
- Lope Fortúnez
- Onneca Fortúnez

== Sources ==
- Aguado Bleye, Pedro; Alcazar Molina, Cayetano Prehistoria, edades antigua y media.
- Collins, Roger (2012). Caliphs and Kings: Spain, 796-1031. Blackwell publishing.
- Cañada Juste, Alberto (2013). "Doña Onneca, una princesa vascona en la corte de los emires cordobeses" (PDF). Príncipe de Viana (in Spanish) (258): 481–502. ISSN 0032-8472.
- Rei, António (2011–2012). "Descendência Hispânica do Profeta do Islão: Exploração de Algumas Linhas Primárias". Armas e Troféus (in Portuguese). 9: 31–59.
- Settipani, Christian (2004). La noblesse du midi carolingien: études sur quelques grandes familles d'Aquitaine et du Languedoc du IXe siècle (in French). Oxford Univ. Unit for Prosopographical Research. ISBN 9781900934046.
