= Muzna =

Muzna (died 968) was a concubine. She was the mother of Abd al-Rahman III.

Her name means "Rain Cloud" in Andalusian Arabic.

== Life ==
She was a woman of the harem of the Emir of Cordoba, the concubine of Prince Muhammad and the mother of Caliph Abd al-Rahman III, which confers the title of umm Walad, which is that carried by the mother of the royal children.

She was of Basque origin, Frankish according to André Clot. She was initially Christian before her conversion to Islam. She was the granddaughter of Fortún Garcés of Pamplona, from the royal family of Navarre, the Arista. She died in 968.

=== Legacy ===
In his treatises and works such as The Necklace of the Dove, Ibn Hazm names her by his own name, Hazm and seems to emphasize family ties between him and her.
