= Larraun =

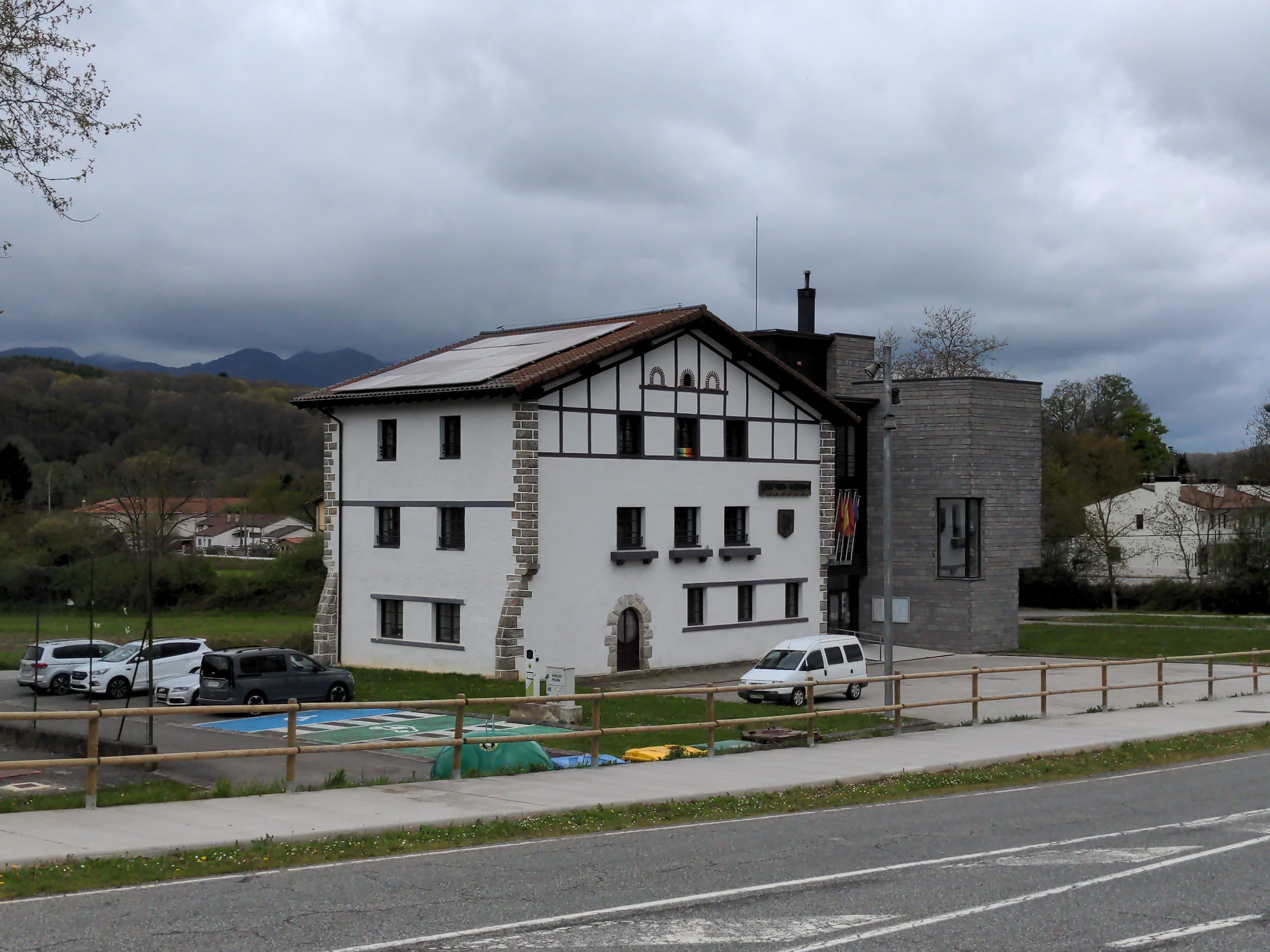
- Town hall

- Coat of arms

- Location of Larraun within Navarre Location of Larraun within Spain
- Coordinates: 43°00′20″N 1°53′47″W
- Country: Spain
- Autonomous community: Navarra

Government
  - Mayor: Mikel Uharte Martija

Area
  - Total: 107.08 km^{2} (41.34 sq mi)
- Elevation: 566 m (1,857 ft)

Population (2025-01-01)
  - Total: 918
  - Density: 8.57/km^{2} (22.2/sq mi)
- Time zone: UTC+1 (CET)
  - Summer (DST): UTC+2 (CEST)

Larraun (Spanish: Larráun) is a town and municipality located in the province and autonomous community of Navarre, northern Spain.
