= Milles de la Polvorosa =

Coordinates: 41°55′N 5°44′W

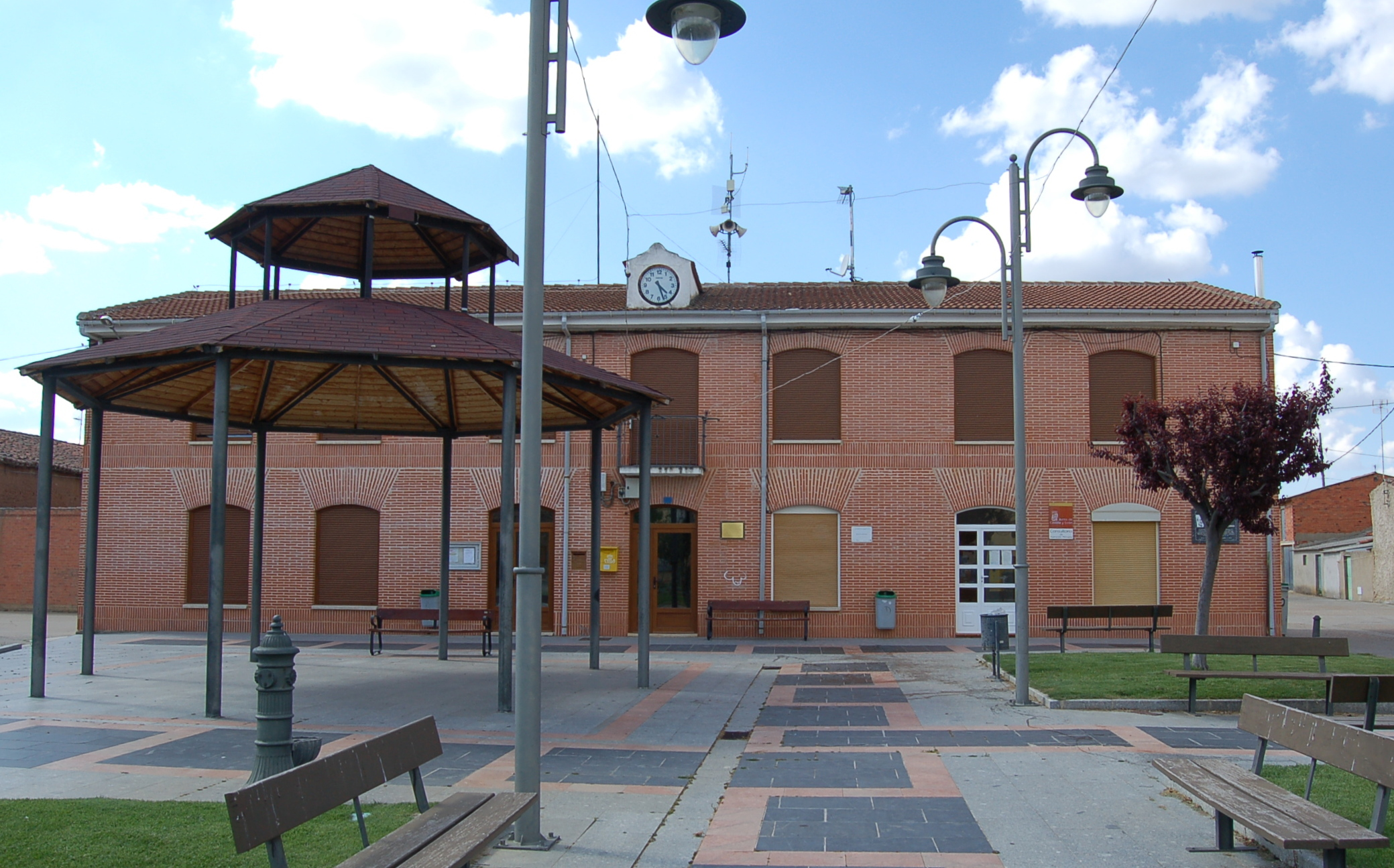
- Interactive map of Milles de la Polvorosa
- Country: Spain
- Autonomous community: Castile and León
- Province: Zamora
- Municipality: Milles de la Polvorosa

Area
  - Total: 18 km^{2} (6.9 sq mi)

Population (2025-01-01)
  - Total: 206
  - Density: 11/km^{2} (30/sq mi)
- Time zone: UTC+1 (CET)
  - Summer (DST): UTC+2 (CEST)
- Website: Official website

Milles de la Polvorosa is a municipality located in the province of Zamora, Castile and León, Spain. According to the 2004 census (INE), the municipality has a population of 265 inhabitants.
