= Valdemora =

Coordinates: 42°11′42″N 5°25′39″W

- municipality
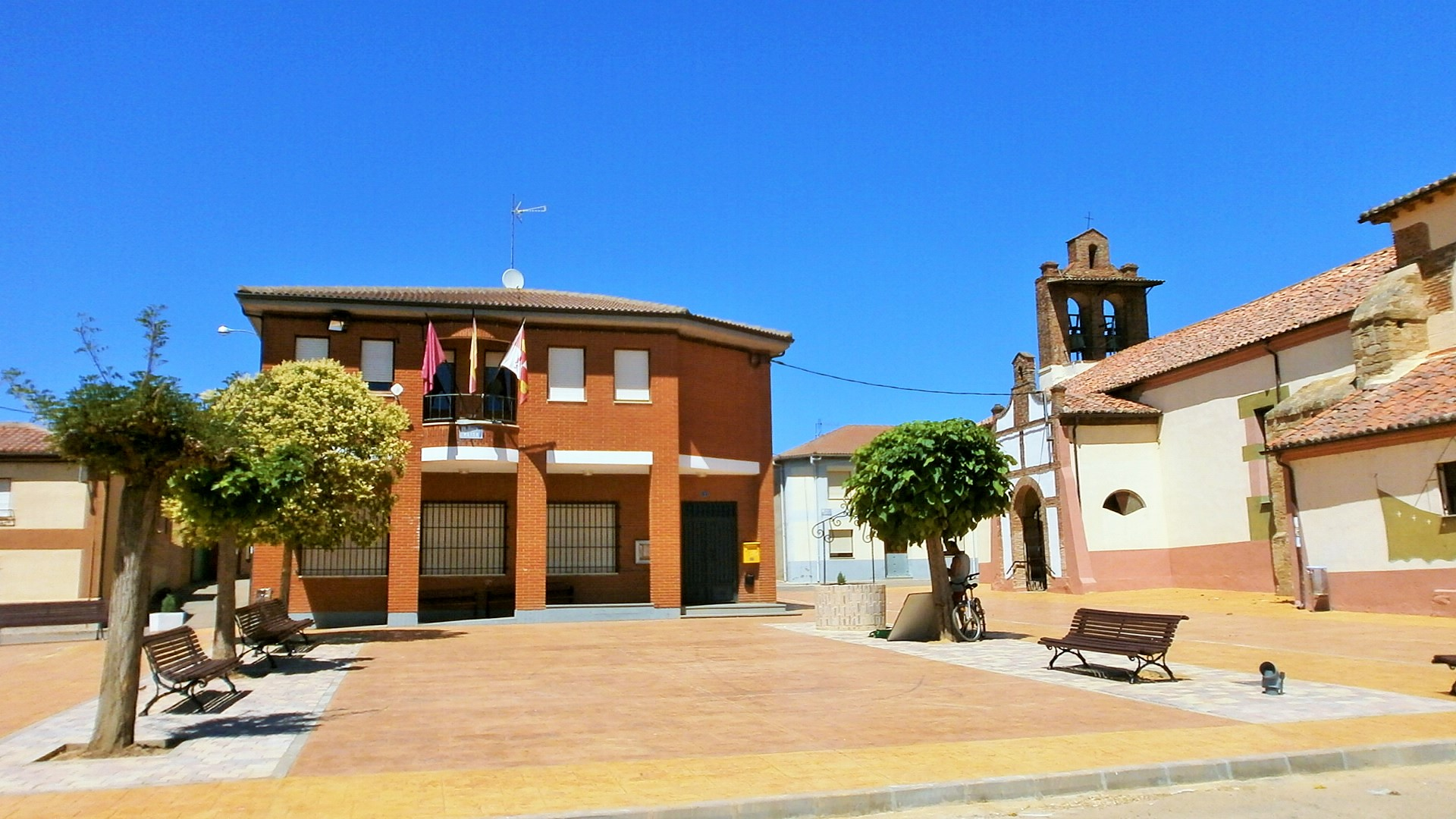
- Valdemora Town Hall
- Interactive map of Valdemora
- Country: Spain
- Autonomous community: Castile and León
- Province: León
- Municipality: Valdemora

Area
  - Total: 13 km^{2} (5.0 sq mi)

Population (2025-01-01)
  - Total: 58
  - Density: 4.5/km^{2} (12/sq mi)
- Time zone: UTC+1 (CET)
  - Summer (DST): UTC+2 (CEST)

Valdemora is a municipality located in the province of León, Castile and León, Spain. According to the 2004 census (INE), the municipality has a population of 102 inhabitants.
