= Muhammad I of Córdoba =

Emir of Córdoba from 852 to 886

Muhammad I of Cordoba محمد بن عبد الرحمن الأوسط
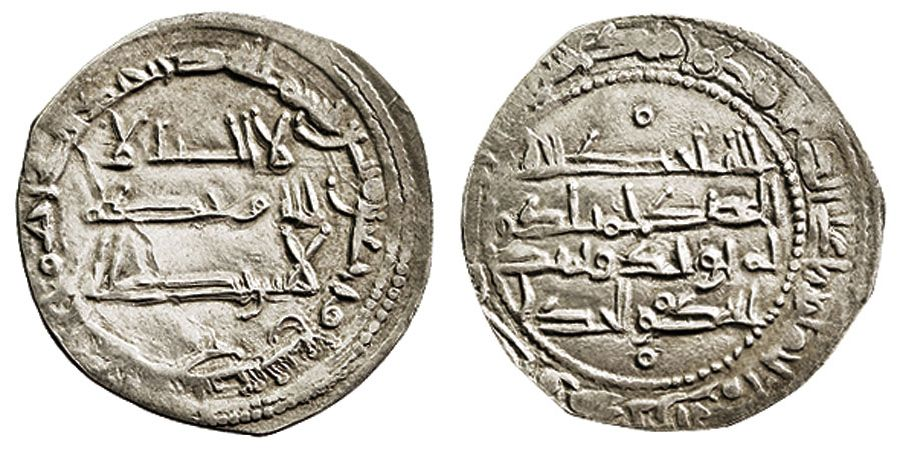
- Silver dirham minted during the reign of Muhammad I

5th Emir of Córdoba
- Reign: 852–886
- Predecessor: Abd ar-Rahman II
- Successor: al-Mundhir
- Born: 823; Córdoba
- Died: 886 (aged 62–63); Córdoba
- Issue: Al-Mundhir of Córdoba; Abdullah of Córdoba
- Dynasty: Umayyad (Marwanid)
- Father: Abd ar-Rahman II
- Mother: Nahtiz
- Religion: Islam

Muhammad I of Cordoba (Arabic: محمد بن عبد الرحمن الأوسط; 823–886) was the Fifth Umayyad ruler of al-Andalus. He ruled during a time of thriving art, architecture and culture in Islamic Iberia in the 9th century, turning Cordoba into a cultural and political center.

== Reign ==
Muhammad I engaged in diplomacy with Charles the Bald, the Carolingian king of the West Franks, sending him camels in 865.

== Martyrs of Cordoba ==
Under the reign of Muhammad I, what became later known as the Cordoban Martyr Movement took place. While a majority of Cordoban Christians conformed to Islamic society and lived comfortably as a result, there were still some who fervently defended their faith. During the mid 9th century there was a group of outspoken Cordoban Christians who publicly denounced Muhammad. As a result of their protests, 50 Christians were executed by the Umayyad government. The source of this event comes from a rediscovered 16th century manuscript.

== Architecture ==
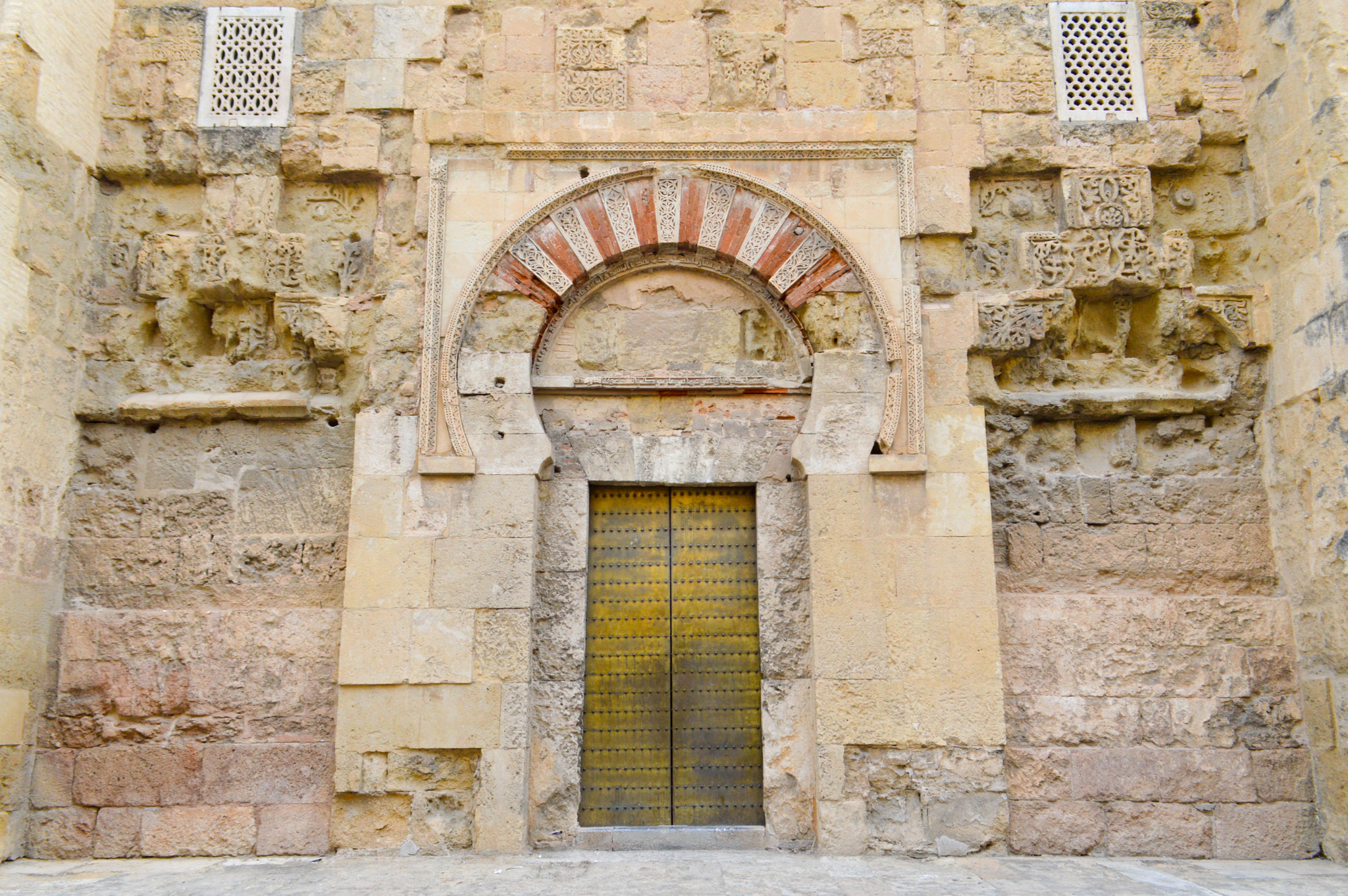
The Puerta de San Estaban, at the Mosque–Cathedral of Córdoba, dates from a renovation under Muhammad I in 855

Muhammad I is credited with some of the work done on the Great Mosque of Cordoba in the 9th century. He may have completed the first major expansion of the mosque begun by his father, Abd ar-Rahman II. He also added a maqsura. In 855 he restored the entrance called Bab al-Wuzara' ("Gate of the Viziers"), known today as the Puerta de San Esteban, which is an important early example of the prototypical Moorish gateway.

One of Muhammad I's wives, Umm Salama, also founded a cemetery and a mosque named after her in the northern suburbs of Cordoba. Over time, this cemetery turned into the city's largest.

== Sources ==
- Altamira, Rafael (1999). "Il califfato occidentale". Storia del mondo medievale. Vol. II. pp. 477–515.
- Calmet, Augustin, 1672–1757. (1767). Histoire Universelle, Sacrée et Profane. Chez Jean Renauld Doulssecker. OCLC 314190685.

Muhammad I of Córdoba Banu Umayyah Cadet branch of the Banu Quraish
Preceded by Abd-ar-rahman II	Emir of Córdoba; 852–886	Succeeded by al-Mundhir
