= Ibn 'Idhari =

Late 13th/early 14th century Maghrebi writer and historian

- ابن عذاري
- Born: Late 13th century Marrakesh, Morocco
- Died: After 1312 CE
- Occupations: Historian, Qāʾid (commander)

Academic work
- Era: Medieval Islamic period
- Main interests: History of the Maghreb and Al-Andalus
- Notable works: Al-Bayan al-Mughrib

Abū al-ʽAbbās Aḥmad ibn Muḥammad ibn ʽIḏārī al-Marrākushī (Arabic: أبو العباس أحمد ابن عذاري المراكشي) was a Moroccan historian of the late-13th/early-14th century, and author of the famous Al-Bayan al-Mughrib, an important medieval history of the Maghreb and Al-Andalus (now the Iberian Peninsula) written in 1312.

Ibn Idhāri was born and lived in Marrakesh (present-day Morocco), and was a qāʾid ('commander') of Fez. Little is known of his life. His only surviving work, Al-Bayan al-Mughrib, is a history of North Africa from the conquest of Miṣr in 640/1 AD to the Almohad conquests in 1205/6 AD. Its value to modern scholarship lies in its extracts from older works, now lost, and in its material not found elsewhere, including reports of the first Viking raids on Al-Andalus in the ninth century. He mentions another biographic work on the caliphs, imāms and amīrs from across the Islamic world, which has not survived. He died after 1312 / 712 AH.
