= Bergüenda =

Hamlet in Álava, Spain

Bergüenda/Bergonda
- Concejo
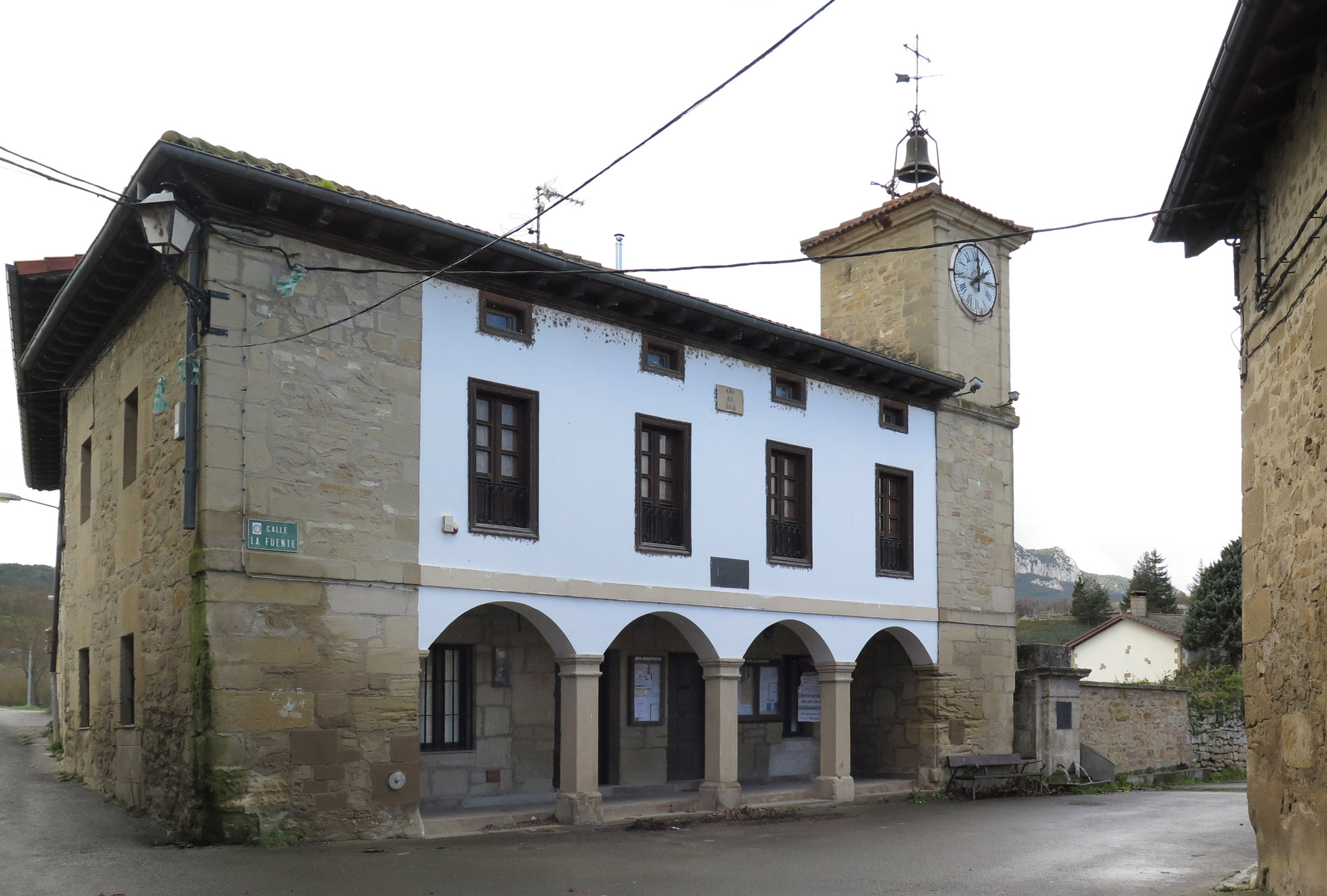

- Location within Álava Location within the Basque Country Location within Spain
- Coordinates: 42°46′39″N 3°02′48″W
- Country: Spain
- Autonomous community: Basque Country
- Province: Álava
- Comarca: Añana
- Municipality: Lantarón

Area
  - Total: 4.77 km^{2} (1.84 sq mi)
- Elevation: 483 m (1,585 ft)

Population (2023)
  - Total: 74
  - Density: 16/km^{2} (40/sq mi)
- Postal code: 01423

Bergüenda (Spanish pronunciation: [beɾˈɣwenda]) or Bergonda (Basque pronunciation: [berɣonda]) is a hamlet and concejo in the municipality of Lantarón, in Álava province, Basque Country, Spain.

== History ==
The settlement of Bergüenda lies along an ancient Roman road and features remains from the Iron Age. It is first documented in the 10th century (913) as Bergonda, recorded in documents from the Monastery of San Millán as part of the royal domain. It later passed to the Count of Orgaz and then to the lord of Villamenazar, to whom local nobles paid an annual tribute of 42 ducats and commoners delivered Christmas hens. Residents freely elected municipal officials, with the lord confirming and receiving the oath of the chief mayor.

In modern times, it belonged to the Brotherhood of the historical Cuadrilla de Vitoria. In the 16th century, proceedings began to seek exemption from the foreign coin tax.

The Hurtado de Corcuera family, hidalgo descendants of the lords of Biscay, owned a tower house in the upper neighborhood that was transformed in the 16th century into a large classicist recreational palace bearing the family coat of arms on its facade. They were notable benefactors of Bergüenda and Bachicabo through various foundations.

The most prominent figure from the house was Sebastián Hurtado de Corcuera, a native of Bergüenda, who distinguished himself militarily as Governor of Panama (1632–1634), Governor-General of the Philippines (1635–1644), and Captain-General of the Canary Islands (1659–1660).

In the mid-19th century, the municipality of Bergüenda included the councils of Bergüenda itself, Fontecha, Puentelarrá, Sobrón, and Alcedo, with a total population of 640 inhabitants.

It retained its own municipal government until 1978, when it merged with neighboring Salcedo to form the current municipality of Lantarón.
