= Alcedo (disambiguation) =

Alcedo is a genus of birds in the kingfisher subfamily Alcedininae. Alcedo may also refer to:

== Populated places ==
- Alcedo, Álava, a village in Lantarón municipality, Spain
- Alcedo, Asturias, town in Las Regueras municipality, Spain
- Alcedo de Alba, a town in La Robla municipality, Spain

== Other ==
- Alcedo Volcano, a volcano on Isabela Island in the Galapagos
- José Bernardo Alcedo, Peruvian composer
