= Villamañán =

Municipality of Spain

Villamañán, Spain
- municipality
- Coat of arms

- Location within Spain Location within Castile and León
- Coordinates: 42°19′0″N 5°34′59″W
- Country: Spain
- Autonomous community: Castile and León
- Province: León
- Municipality: Villamañán

Government
  - Mayor: José Marcos Fernández Suárez (Partido Popular)

Area
  - Total: 57.80 km^{2} (22.32 sq mi)
- Elevation: 765 m (2,510 ft)

Population (2025-01-01)
  - Total: 1,084
  - Density: 18.75/km^{2} (48.57/sq mi)
- Demonym(s): villamanense sardinero,-a
- Time zone: UTC+1 (CET)
  - Summer (DST): UTC+2 (CEST)
- Postal Code: 24234
- Telephone prefix: 987
- Website: www.aytovillamanan.es/Ayto%20de%20Villamañán

Villamañán (Spanish pronunciation: [biʎamaˈɲan]) is a town in the southwest of the province of León, Spain, on the river Esla, in the area known as Esla-Campos, in the autonomous community of Castile and León in Spain.

It was originally known as Villamagna, but the name evolved to its current version, Villamañán. It is also believed that the name may derive from the Arabic word “Villamannan,” referring to the numerous springs in the area.

The distance from Madrid is 302 km, 37 km from León, 152 km from Valladolid, and 320 km from A Coruña.

== Demographics and geography ==
Villamañán had a population of 1,084 (INE 2025). As of the 2005 census, In total, there are 736 households. 633 of the population are males and 654 are females. It includes, in addition to the town of the same name, the villages of Benamariel, San Esteban, Villacalviel, and Villacé. Located within the Páramo Leonés region, it is located within a distance of 37 km of the city of León. Its total area is 57,8 km^{2}.

The geography of the area is characterized by its relatively flat terrain, largely due to the Esla River flowing nearby, which creates a wide river plain. However, this description applies to only half the municipality. The other half, (corresponding to the Páramo Leonés plain) is higher in elevation, about as flat as the floodplain but somewhat more rugged in the transition between the two areas. Additionally, the presence of elevated clay hills at the plain, known as Oteros, is quite distinctive; these were traditionally used to build wine cellars. The municipality is home to the El Verde triangulation point, at an elevation of 806 m above sea level. Elevations range from 814 meters (2670.6 feet) in the northwest to 750 meters (2460.6 feet) along the banks of the Esla River. The town itself lies at 787 meters (2582.0 feet) above sea level.

The municipality's demographic trends mirror those of rural areas, with significant depopulation in favor of urban centers; however, in recent years, this trend has slowed, and the municipality has experienced several years of population growth, all of which occurred after the opening of the Ruta de la Plata Expressway in 2003.

As of 2008, the municipal populations are as follows:

- Villamañán: 956
- Villacé: 101
- Villacalviel: 73
- San Esteban: 88
- Benamariel: 79
- Other/Dispersed: 0

== Esla River ==
The Esla River flows from north to south through the eastern part of the municipality. Running almost parallel to it is the Esla Canal, which irrigates the river’s floodplain. In addition, the Páramo Bajo Diversion Canal also crosses the territory, supplying irrigation water to other municipalities in the region.

== Climate ==
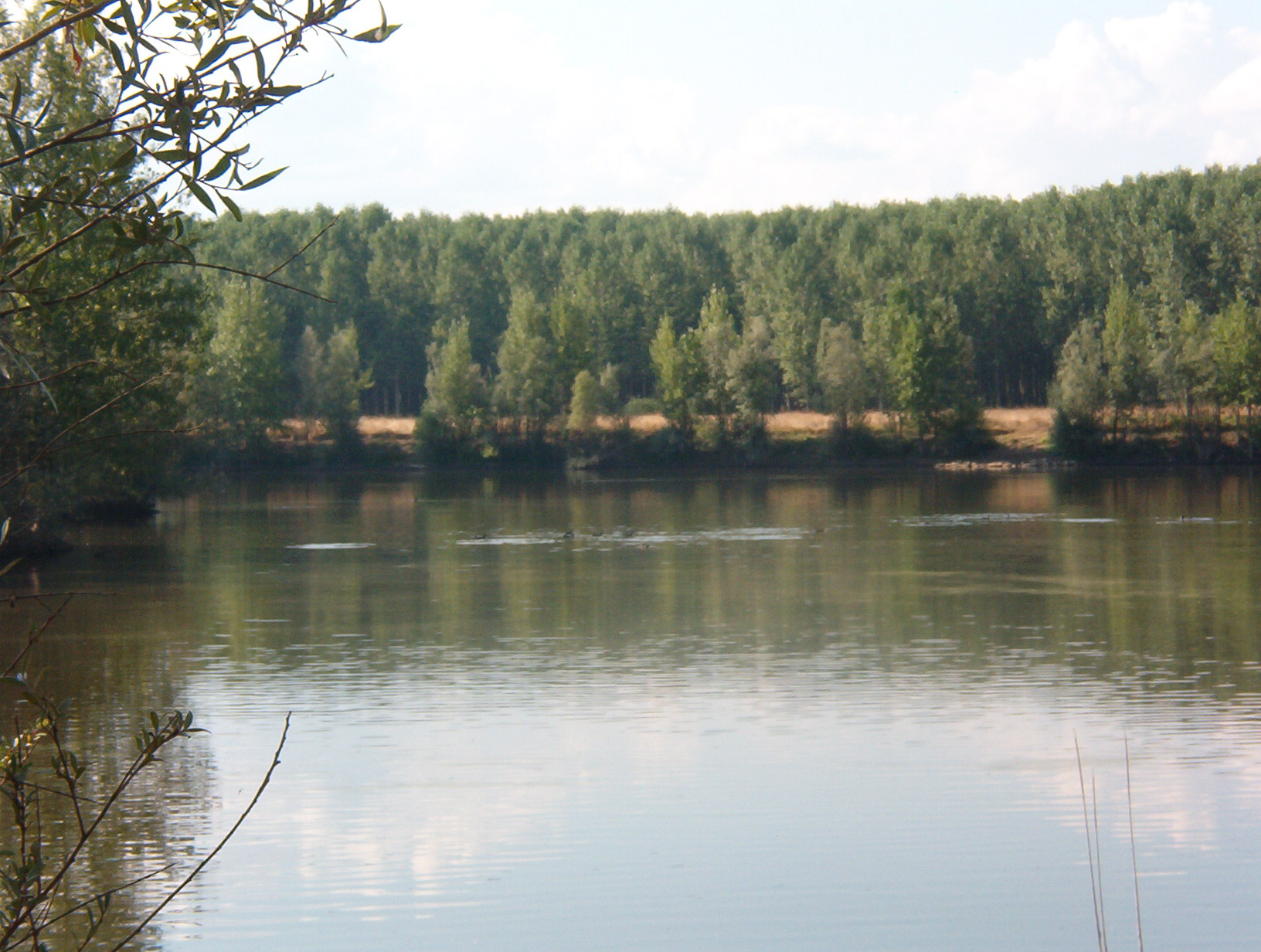
Esla River near the region

The climate in the municipality is a continentalized Mediterranean climate, similar to the rest of the Northern Plateau. It is slightly modified by the influence of the Cantabrian Mountains. Precipitation is distributed unevenly, with peaks in spring and fall and low rainfall during the summer. Winter temperatures are cold, with frequent frosts and sporadic snowfall, while summers are short and hot.

== History ==
=== Origins ===
There are two interpretations of the town's origins, depending on the author.

==== Roman origins ====
The House of Flórez de Villamañán is associated with the sword and chain mail of Saint Marcelus the Centurion, patron saint of the city of León. The saint’s house and parish church are located there, along with his and Saint Nona's (his wife) twelve children. All were martyrs. In the city and surrounding regions, tradition holds that the Flórez de Villamañán's family descends from Saint Marcelo, although there is no document to substantiate this, nor can there be, given the saint’s antiquity: he lived during the fourth century of the Church, in the time of Emperor Diocletian.

==== Mozarabic origins ====
The most likely origin of Villamañán relates to the settlement of a man named Manna or Mannan, of Mozarabic origin, who came to the region during the period of the first repopulation, along with numerous other immigrants of the same origin. These immigrants arrived during the reign of Ordoño I and especially Alfonso III, and left a lasting mark on the region along the banks of the Esla River. Their settlements centered around the monastic complex of Saint Justo and Saint Pastor in Ardón. Historical evidence of that repopulation still endures, with today’s place names referencing the colonizing activity of the families Mannan, Cete, Luparia, Mariel, Amariel, Algadefe, Amor, Iunez, Fahlon, and others. These families succeeded in stabilizing and bringing prestige to their farms (vilas or vilares), leaving a memory of the first settler through the place names.

=== 10th century ===
Presumably, the first settler to arrive in Villamañán was of Mozarabic origin with the name Mannan. This can be inferred from a document dated May 20, 905, in which King Alfonso III donated numerous properties to the Church of San Salvador in Oviedo, in which Villa Mannan is mentioned. The document states that Villamañán (Villa Mannan) belonged to the territory of Coyanza and had its own municipal district, adjacent to the Esla River and bordering the municipal district of San Millán de los Caballeros, which at that time was known as Sancti Emiliani (San Emiliano).

In the Becerro (calfskin) of the Royal Collegiate Church of San Isidoro, Villamañán is listed with a large portion of its assets assigned to the Isidorian estates, a fact recorded in that book in the year 965.

During the campaigns of 995 and 996, when the Arab leader Almanzor marched up the banks of the Esla River to reach the city of León, there was already a significant settlement in the vicinity of the valley known as Villa-Magna. This in turn marked the end of another secondary valley that began in the village of Villadangos. The closest crossing point, connecting the two banks of the Esla River, was a Roman-built bridge that provided access to the fertile Fresno floodplain. This bridge no longer exists.

=== 19th century ===
In the 19th century, the Esla Canal was being built. By the mid 19th-century, the town had a recorded population of 1,408. It is described in the sixteenth volume of Pascual Madoz’s Diccionario geográfico-estadístico-histórico de España y sus posesiones de Ultramar (Geographical, Statistical, and Historical Dictionary of Spain and Its Overseas Possessions) as follows:

"VILLAMAÑAN: a town with a town council, a subordinate administrative office for the post office, salt, tobacco, and stamped paper, serving 60 villages, in the province and diocese of León (5 leg.), the judicial district of Valencia de D. Juan (1), and the territorial court and general court of Valladolid (18). Located at the end of the beautiful, narrow valley leading from Villadangos and at the beginning of the Vega de Toral; the mighty Esla River flows eastward at a distance of half a cuarto de legua, irrigating part of its fields; its climate is temperate and healthy, though catarrhal and tertian fevers are common. It has 420 houses, most of them two-story and well-built; a town hall and jail; a primary school endowed with 1,100 reales, attended by 80 boys; another for girls attended by 40 students, with an endowment of 1,000 reales; and a Latin class with the same number of students, attended by 30 pupils. The parish church (San Salvador) is a spacious and magnificent building, with elegant vaults, beautiful flooring, and a tall, slender tower, on whose lantern the clock is mounted: It is served by one priest and one beneficiary appointed by the Marquis of Astorga, as well as an ecclesiastical chapter of six hereditary clergymen who are obligated to fulfill various charitable duties and attend the funerals of the poor from the Hospital of San Juan, which is under the care of the hospital brotherhood of that name. To the east, outside the town walls, stands the shrine of Our Lady of La Zarza, deeply venerated by the townspeople, and to the west, the former convent of San Pedro Alcántara, whose church serves as an auxiliary parish church. The neighborhood is supplied by a spring located in the valley known as San Claudio, as well as others that flow in various places. It borders Vilace, Venamariel, Zuares, Pobladura, San Millán, Villademor, Fresno de la Vega, Cabañas, and Valencia de D. Juan; within its municipal boundaries lies the hamlet of San Pedro Arenales. The land is of good, moderate, or poor quality and is fertilized by the waters of the Esla River. The main roads of any practical use to this village run from Asturias through the Magdalena and Leitariegos mountain passes toward the capital, and the road from the regions of Salamanca and Zamora toward León and Oviedo, both of which are quite neglected. It receives mail for itself and for 30 villages in its postal district from the main administrative office in Benavente, with a separate mailbag, via the general mail service that passes through at 4:00 p.m. on Mondays, Thursdays, and Saturdays bound for León and Asturias, and mail from those destinations arrives at 5:00 a.m. on Sundays, Wednesdays, and Thursdays. Products: grains, legumes, wine, and pastureland; livestock is raised, particularly sheep, along with some hunting and fishing. Industry: several flour mills and linen and wool looms. Trade: it exports wine, wool, and other surplus goods, and imports those it lacks. It hosts one of the busiest weekly markets in the province every Wednesday, as well as two annual fairs: one on the Wednesday after Saint Peter’s Day (June 29) and another on the Wednesday after Saint Michael’s Day (September 29), during which towns within a 10-leg radius stock up on farming tools, equipment for the grape harvest, and other goods consumed in the region. Population: 313 households, 1,408 inhabitants. Capital and production: 1,951,805 rs. Taxes: 119,311. Contributions: 64,271 rs. 5 mrs.

== Local attractions ==
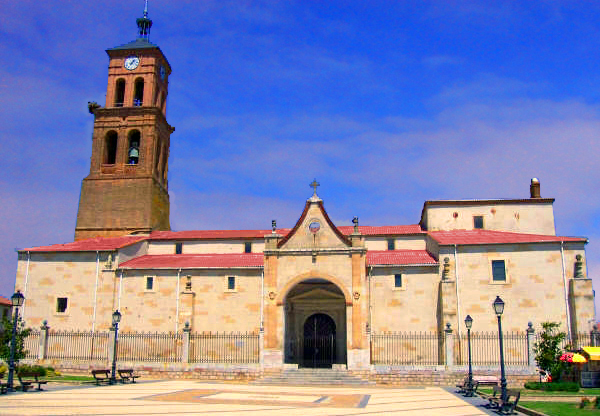
Villamañán's Plaza Mayor

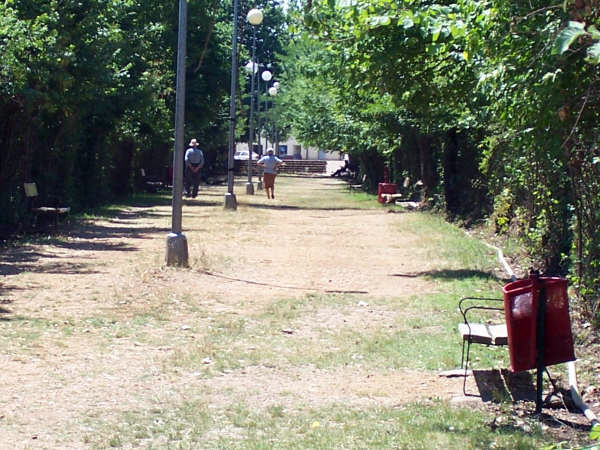
Main entrance of Villamañán's park el Jardín

Some of the more famous locations in town are Plaza Mayor or La Plaza (the town's biggest and main square where the Villamañán's historic church and tower are located, along with a famous candy and magazine shop), the historic church of La Zarza (literally: Church of the Blackberry). According to legend, the ghost of Virgin Mary appeared on a blackberry shrub and told the people who saw it to build a church there in her honor. There is also a park, known as el Jardín (the Garden).

Every summer, Villamañán becomes a tourist hub. Visitors from all over Spain and other countries worldwide visit and stay in town; the majority of tourists come from Asturias, Spain. There are two swimming pools in Villamañán open to the public: these function as social spots for the town. One is located next to Villamañán's soccer field. The swimming pool is public and belongs to the Villamañán City Hall. There are many other coffee shops and bars in town.

Every week on Wednesday morning and afternoon there is a market in Plaza Mayor where food, clothes, and accessories can be found.

== Economy ==
Villamañán’s economy is primarily agricultural, although it is strongly influenced by its location along the Silver Route and the small industrial hub of Valencia de Don Juan. As a result, although the economy is based on the primary sector, the secondary and tertiary sectors play a significant role in generating wealth.

The primary sector is dominated by both rain-fed and irrigated agriculture, with corn being the most widely grown crop, followed by sugar beets and barley. After years of vineyard destruction, viticulture is regaining importance—an importance that is likely to increase now that wines produced in the municipality are eligible for the Designation of Origin.

The secondary sector is small and less important; however, there are a few significant factories. Most notable is the Villacé ceramics plant, which produces bricks using clay from the local soil. Industrial activity is anticipated to see an increase in employment once the El Pajuelo industrial park is completed. Located next to the A-66 highway (León-Benavente) and alongside a natural gas pipeline heading toward Gijón, the park will cover 160,000 square meters upon completion of the first phase.

The service sector specializes in activities related to tourism, due to the massive influx of tourists coming mainly from Asturias and other parts of the country. Many of these tourists are familiar with Villamañan because they or their families emigrated to their current places of residence from Villamañan or the surrounding area.

== Transportation and communication ==
=== Major roadways ===
Villamañán is nestled in the transition between the Páramo region and the Esla River valley.

The municipality is crossed by the Ruta de la Plata Expressway (A-66) and National Highway N-630, between pK 172 and 179, as well as by Regional Highway CL-621, which connects to Santa María del Páramo and Valencia de Don Juan, and Provincial Highway LE-411, which leads to Laguna de Negrillos, and by local roads that provide access to Valdevimbre and Ardón.

There is a road linking Villamañán with Fontecha and the CL-622. This connects the town center with all the towns in the municipality except Benamariel, which is connected to Villamañán via the N-630.

=== Airports ===
León Airport, which opened in 1999, is the nearest airport, located 34 kilometers from Villamañán.

== Symbols ==
The Shield of Villamañán

The primary symbol of Villamañán is a shield divided into 4 quadrants by a cross. The top-left and bottom-right quarters are silver, with a purple lion with a red tongue and claws, crowned in gold. The top-right and bottom-left are red, with a gold castle with black masonry and azure highlights. In the center sits an azure shield, with three silver sardines inside. On top of the sheld rests a royal crown.

== Government and politics ==
The government of the municipality is chosen by a democratically elected City Council, whose members are elected every four years by universal suffrage. The electoral roll consists of all residents registered in Villamañán who are 18 years of age or older and are nationals of any of the member countries of the European Union. In accordance with the General Electoral System Act, the municipal council consists of 9 council members. The General Electoral System Act establishes the number of council members to be elected based on the municipality’s population.

=== List of elected mayors ===
Legislature	Year	Name	Political Party
1st Legislature	04/19/1979	ÁLVAREZ MARTÍNEZ, ENRIQUE	Unión de Centro Democrático (UCD)
2nd Legislature	05/24/1983	SANTAMARTA DE BARROS, LUIS	Partido Socialista de Castilla y León (PSCyL-PSOE)
3rd Legislature	06/30/1987	GARRIDO GARCÍA, ANDRÉS	Alianza Popular (AP)
4th Legislature	06/15/1991	GARRIDO GARCÍA, ANDRÉS	Partido Popular de Castilla y León (PP-CyL)
5th Legislature	06/17/1995	GARRIDO GARCÍA, ANDRÉS	Partido Popular de Castilla y León (PP-CyL)
6th Legislature	03/07/1999	PRIETO RODRÍGUEZ, ELENA	Partido Socialista de Castilla y León (PSCyL-PSOE)
7th Legislature	06/14/2003	TEJEDOR GANCEDO, SEGUNDO	Partido Popular de Castilla y León (PP-CyL)
8th Legislature	06/16/2007	TEJEDOR GANCEDO, SEGUNDO	Partido Popular de Castilla y León (PP-CyL)
9th Legislature	06/13/2011	TEJEDOR GANCEDO, SEGUNDO	Partido Popular de Castilla y León (PP-CyL)
10th Legislature	06/13/2015	GARCÍA DOMÍNGUEZ, HIGINIO	Unión del Pueblo Leonés (UPL)
11th Legislature	06/15/2019	GARCÍA DOMÍNGUEZ, HIGINIO	Unión del Pueblo Leonés (UPL)
12th Legislature	06/17/2023	GARCÍA DOMÍNGUEZ, HIGINIO	Unión del Pueblo Leonés (UPL)
12th Legislature	12/01/2023	FERNÁNDEZ SUÁREZ, JOSÉ MARCOS	Partido Popular de Castilla y León (PP-CyL)
Information obtained from the Local Information System (SIL), which contains lists of mayors elected since 1979 in each Spanish municipality, organized by autonomous community, available on the website of the Ministry of Territorial Policy and Democratic Memory.

==== Municipal election results ====
Results of municipal elections are as follows:

Political Party	2023			2019			2015			2011			2007			2003		
Political Party	%	Votes	City Council Members	%	Votes	City Council Members	%	Votes	City Council Members	%	Votes	City Council Members	%	Votes	City Council Members	%	Votes	City Council Members
Partido Popular de Castilla y León (PP-CyL)	35.46	255	4	43.92	340	4	41.59	324	4	54.83	471	5	60.49	568	6	44.62	423	5
Unión del Pueblo Leonés (UPL)	26.42	190	3	32.17	249	3	30.42	237	3	18.98	163	2	10.33	97	1	27.32	259	3
Partido Socialista de Castilla y León (PSCyL-PSOE)	25.31	182	2	22.35	173	2	24.78	193	2	23.86	205	2	26.62	250	2	16.67	158	1
Ciudadanos Rurales Agrupados	6.53	47	0															
Vox (partido político)	4.86	35																
CIULE																7.59	72	0

Political Party	1999			1995			1991			1987			1983			1979		
Political Party	%	Votes	City Council Members	%	Votes	City Council Members	%	Votes	City Council Members	%	Votes	City Council Members	%	Votes	City Council Members	%	Votes	City Council Members
Partido Socialista de Castilla y León (PSCyL-PSOE)	35.98	354	3	37.63	394	4	36.54	368	3	29.50	303	3	28.83	299	3			
Coalición Popular (AP-PDP-UL) / Alianza Popular (AP) / Partido Popular de Castilla y León (PP-CyL)	33.94	334	3	46.32	485	4	47.37	477	5	36.12	371	4	15.14	157	1			
Unión del Pueblo Leonés (UPL)	28.86	284	3	14.90	156	1												
Centro Democrático y Social (CDS)							13.60	137	1	26.78	275	2						
Independientes										6.62	68	0	29.03	301	3	29.23	209	2
Partido Demócrata Liberal (PDL)													27.00	280	2			
Unión de Centro Democrático (UCD)																70.77	506	7

==== Municipal areas ====
The municipal territory, in addition to the municipal seat, includes the settlements of Villacé, San Esteban de Villacalbiel, Benamariel, and Villacalbiel. All except Benamariel are very close to one another.

The municipal administration is organized into departments, each headed by a council member from the governing team. Each department has several divisions depending on the responsibilities assigned to it. These vary from one municipal administration to another. The City Council’s current departments and positions are as follows:

Higinio García Domínguez's Second Administration
Political Party	Unión del Pueblo Leonés
Political Party	Partido Socialista Obrero Español
Position	Title
Mayor	Higinio García Domínguez
Deputy Mayor's Offices
First Deputy Mayor	José Ángel García Núñez
Second Deputy Mayor	Alfonso Javares Martínez
City Council Departments
People and Works	Julián Ordás Nava
Youth and Sports	Alfonso Javares Martínez
Culture	Belén Castañón del Pozo
Municipal Representatives
Representative to the Association of Municipalities of Southern León	José Ángel García Núñez
Representative to the El Salvador Rural Community Center in Villamañán	José Ángel García Núñez
Representative to the POEDA Local Action Group	Julián Ordás Nava
Representative to the Regional Health Council	Alfonso Javares Martínez

The municipality of Villamañán is part of the judicial district of León. The district has seven courts of first instance, including one administrative court, one juvenile court, three labor courts, and one prison oversight court, as well as the provincial court. The provincial court has three civil and criminal courts.

== Local holidays and culture ==
=== Heritage ===
Due to its past as a commercial hub for the Páramo and the Vega del Esla, the town has two squares with arcades. These squares—the Plaza Mayor and the Plaza de la Leña—were once the sites of bustling markets. More recently they have seen a sharp decline, though markets are still held in the Plaza de la Leña. The Plaza Mayor is dominated by the town’s 17th-century church, which contains a large tower that has become the town’s emblem. This tower has been demolished and rebuilt numerous times, gradually altering its appearance. Inside the church, the image of Saint Salvador and an altarpiece with 18th-century sculptures by Diego Solís stand out. The central altarpiece, the clock, the bells, the pulpit, and the choir stalls come from the now-defunct Monastery of San Pedro de Eslonza in Santa Olaja de Eslonza.

Also noteworthy is the a wayside shrine, the Ermita de la Zarza, which is dedicated to the town’s patron saint and is located on the outskirts. According to legend, the Virgin Mary appeared in a bramble bush nearby and commanded those who witnessed the apparition to build a church there in her honor.

Other sites of cultural significance include the bridge on the old N-630 highway—built of brick and known as the “Bridge of the Twenty Arches”—and the wine cellars, which were carved into the hills near the town. These wine cellars have, mostly managed to survive while retaining their traditional features.

=== Museums ===
There is a motorcycle museum located in the town's old movie theater.

=== Festivals and holidays ===
==== Fiestas de la Zarza (Blackberry Festival) ====
The biggest festival in Villamañán is held in early September, roughly between the 7th and 11th of the month, in honor of the Virgin of La Zarza, the town’s patron saint. This celebration is known as the Fiestas de la Zarza. Just as well-known as the patron saint herself are the “Peñas”—groups of townspeople or people connected to the town, usually friends, who gather at venues scattered throughout the town. or in the past at the “Peñódromo,” to celebrate the festivities. It is a great tradition for those celebrating the Fiestas de la Zarza to go from peña to peña, usually at night and well past dawn, visiting different peñas and their members and enjoying what they have to offer—primarily alcoholic beverages and live music.

During the Zarza Festival, various activities are held in the mornings and afternoons, typically organized by local clubs or groups and the City Council. These events are designed for all ages to ensure everyone has a good time and include contests, tournaments, and exhibitions. Every year art galleries from town show exclusive and private artwork owned or created by residents from Villamañán for a limited time only, during Fiestas de la Zarza. The most well-known event is the Paella Contest, famous for the fact that many attendees end up in a nearby swimming pool every year, whether by choice or by accident. Also part of the tradition are the orchestras from different parts of Spain that perform in the Plaza Mayor each night, the fireworks displays held on two to three nights during the festivities, and the well-loved festival programs distributed to every home and business in town a few days before the start of the Zarza festivities.

Other typical aspects of the Zarza festival are the attractions and stalls that are set up in the Plaza Mayor and surrounding area. The opening ceremony is also a popular event. This ceremony consists of a fireworks display and the ringing of church bells, the proclamation of the festival queen and her ladies-in-waiting (five local 16-year-old girls; if there are more than five, a vote is held among all 16-year-old girls to choose the five, if there are fewer than five, all local 16-year-old girls will participate, and as many non-local 16-year-old girls with ties to the town as necessary will be included to make up the five). A parade of floats also occurs: The parade consists of carts usually towed by tractors in which members of each club put on a show by dressing according to a theme. Each float represents a club, parading through the town’s streets. The most original float receives a prize from the City Council.

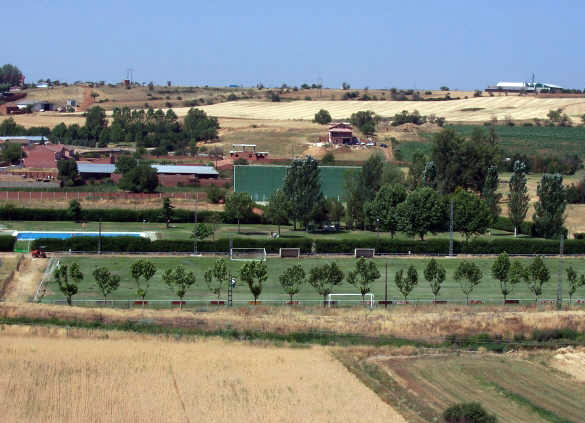
View of the Villamañán's soccer field, public swimming pool and tennis court

==== San Antonio (St. Anthony) ====
The festival of Saint Anthony is celebrated in June. Even though the official holiday date is June 13, it is celebrated until the following or second Saturday from the official date.

The festival of San Antonio is held in honor of Saint Anthony, another patron saint. According to popular belief, Saint Anthony brings good luck to singles and helps them find their soulmate. Famous for the beautiful bonfire lit at the start of the evening in front of the main entrance of the park known as El Jardín. Another traditional feature of this night is the orchestra that performs in the Plaza Mayor from the start of the evening until the early hours of the morning, with a different band each year coming from various parts of Spain.

Another tradition is the brief interruption in the band’s performance late at night to present prizes from a town raffle and to distribute traditional orujo and cookies to all attendees. Today, after the orchestra’s performance ends, many people continue the party until the early hours of the morning and even past sunrise at the famous Savoy Pub, various bars in town, or at El Jardín.

==== Santiago (St. James) ====
The festival of Saint James is celebrated in July. Even though the official holiday date is July 25, it is celebrated until the following or second Saturday from the official date.

Unlike other Spanish national holidays, St. James’ Day holds special significance and is celebrated on a grand scale. In addition to being a national holiday, it is also celebrated as a local festival. It is very common on this day to gather in the afternoon, usually at El Jardín (although sometimes the gathering has taken place at the school grounds known as Las Escuelas), and to enjoy food and drinks distributed by the City Council to all attendees—typically bread and chorizo. The celebration continues until the early hours of the morning and also features a band that usually begins playing at the start of the evening.

==== San Marcos (St. Mark) ====
This holiday takes place on April 25. It is the smallest and least-celebrated holiday in Villamañán. On this day, residents gather in the morning or afternoon near the San Pedro chapel—located between the villages of Villamañán and Villacé and across from the new cemetery—to enjoy drinks and traditional bread with cheese, which is distributed by the City Council. On some occasions, a band performs in the village.

==== Sábado de Piñata (Pinhata Saturday) ====
Pinhata Saturday is celebrated the following Saturday after Spain's carnival. Along with the holiday of San Marcos, this holiday has the smallest number of visitors. A costume contest and dance is celebrated late at night, usually in a building known as el Salón Cultural. Celebrations last until the morning hours. Everyone in town wears a costume night and a band also plays music for people to dance to. Originally this dance and contest used to take place at the coffee shop/bar Casino.

=== Food ===
See also: Castilian-Leonese cuisine

==== Wine ====
Villamañán is known for its wine production from a native grape variety known as Prieto Picudo, under the Tierras de León Designation of Origin. In addition to this grape, the municipality also produces wines from Verdejo, Mencía, and Tempranillo, among others.

Wine has traditionally been produced in small cellars dug into the hills near the towns within the municipality, as is typical of the rural areas of León with a winemaking tradition. Today, however, wine production in these cellars is in sharp decline and has been replaced by wine production in the municipality’s modern wineries.

==== Cheese ====
For many years there was a cheese factory owned by the Tomás brothers, where they produced and sold a matured sheep's-milk cheese of exceptional quality that was typical of the region.

==== Sports ====
===== Prominent teams =====
Team	Sport	Category	Stadium	Created
Club de Fútbol Villamañán	Soccer	Amateur	Villamañán Municipal Sports Center	2012

===== Clubs =====
Club	Sport	Stadium	Created	Disbanded
Villamañán Sports Club	Soccer	Villamañán Municipal Sports Center		

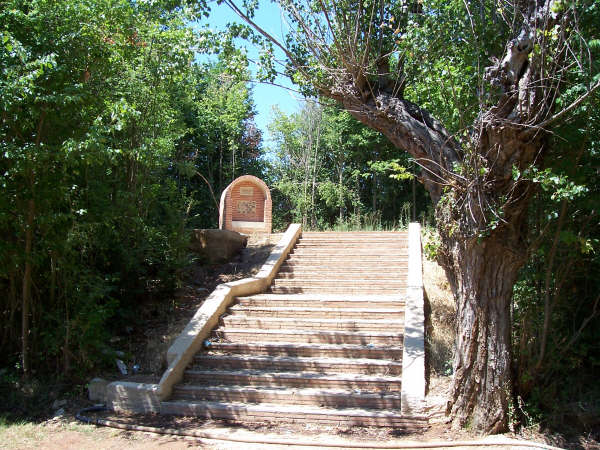
Spring inside of Villamañán's park el Jardín

== Monuments, historic buildings and points of interest ==
Some of the more famous historic buildings in Villamañán are la Ermita de la Zarza (Church of the Blackberry), where legend says the ghost of Virgin Mary appeared on a blackberry shrub and told the people who saw it to build a church there in her honor. There is also a historic church located in Plaza Mayor along with a big tower that can be seen from anywhere in the town the surrounding areas. Its bells ring every hour and half an hour, and can be heard from anywhere in town.

== See also ==
- https://es.wikipedia.org/wiki/Portal:Le%C3%B3n: Content related to the Province of Leon.
- Tierra de León Designation of Origin: https://es.wikipedia.org/wiki/Le%C3%B3n_(vino)
