= Saucedo =

Saucedo is a Spanish surname that became popular in the 16th century. It means "Of or relating to the Willow Tree". The first people with that name were Spanish settlers who came to America from an area in Spain known as the "Valle de Salcedo" (Salcedo Valley, in the Basque Country). From then on, the name variated from Salcedo to other names such as Salcido. The Basque version is Saratsu or Sarasua

== People ==
- Cirilo Saucedo (born 1982), Mexican footballer
- Danny Saucedo (born 1986), Swedish singer-songwriter of Bolivian descent
- David Saucedo (born 1981), Argentine boxer
- Fernando Saucedo (born 1990), Bolivian footballer
- Francisco Montes de Oca y Saucedo (1837–1885), Mexican politician and military surgeon
- Gonzalo Saucedo (born 1985), Argentine footballer
- Guillermo Saucedo (born 1940), Argentine fencer
- Mauricio Saucedo (born 1985), Bolivian footballer
- Michael Saucedo (born 1970), American television actor
- Pablo Saucedo (born 1982), Argentine Ecuadorian footballer
- Raúl Saucedo (1904–1966), Argentine fencer
- Rick Saucedo (born 1955), American musician, songwriter, actor and Elvis tribute artist
- Roberto Nicolás Saucedo (born 1982), Argentine footballer
- Tayler Saucedo (born 1993), American baseball player
- Ulises Saucedo (1896–1963), Bolivian football coach and referee
- Luz del Rosario Saucedo (born 1983), Mexican footballer

== See also ==
- Salcedo (disambiguation)
