= Añana Diapir =

Diapir in the Basque Country, Spain

Coordinates: 42.7892°N 2.9733°W

Añana Diapir Protected Natural Landscape
- Paisaje natural protegido del Diapiro de Añana (Spanish); Añanako diapiroko paisaia natural babestua (Basque)
- IUCN category V (protected landscape/seascape)
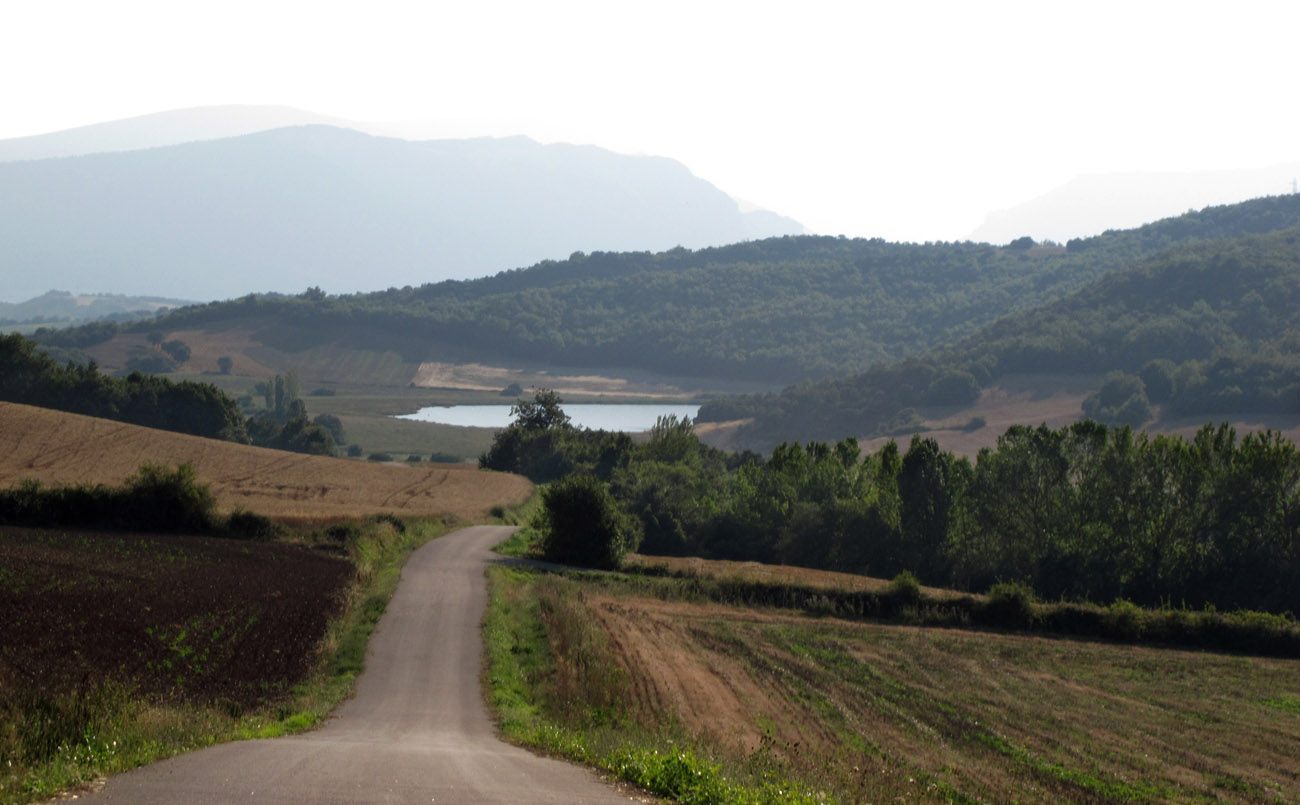
- Landscape in the area, with Lake Arreo visible in the background
- Location: Álava, Basque Country, Spain
- Area: 14.81 km^{2} (5.72 sq mi)
- Established: 31 May 2016

The Añana Diapir (Basque: Añanako diapiroa, Spanish: Diapiro de Añana) is a diapir in Álava, Basque Country, Spain. Two notable wetlands are located within the diapir: the Salt Valley of Añana and Lake Arreo. It was declared a protected biotope by the Basque Government in 2016, and redesignated as a protected natural landscape in 2023.

== Geology ==
The Añana Diapir was formed by evaporites from the Keuper which ascended through Jurassic, Cretaceous and Tertiary layers. Other types of rocks were carried together with the evaporites, notably ophites. Clay, marl and gypsum are also present in the diapir. The hydrogeological system of the diapir is complex. The saline water that flows through the Salt Valley results of the mixing of (at least) two types of water: superficial waters from the eastern part of the diapir and deeper waters from the western part (the ones which make the spring water saline).

== Flora and fauna ==
In the hypersaline waters of the Salt Valley, the only animals present are Artemia parthenogenetica and Ochthebius notabilis, with more species in areas of lower salinity. Lake Arreo is home to four fish species, and several bird species have been observed in its vicinity.

About half of the diapir is covered by forests, consisting mostly of Pinus sylvestris and Quercus faginea. Several hydrophytes are found in Lake Arreo, while its shores are covered by common reed and other plants. Several halophilic plant species are present in the Salt Valley.
