= Zubillaga =

Village in Álava, Spain

- Concejo
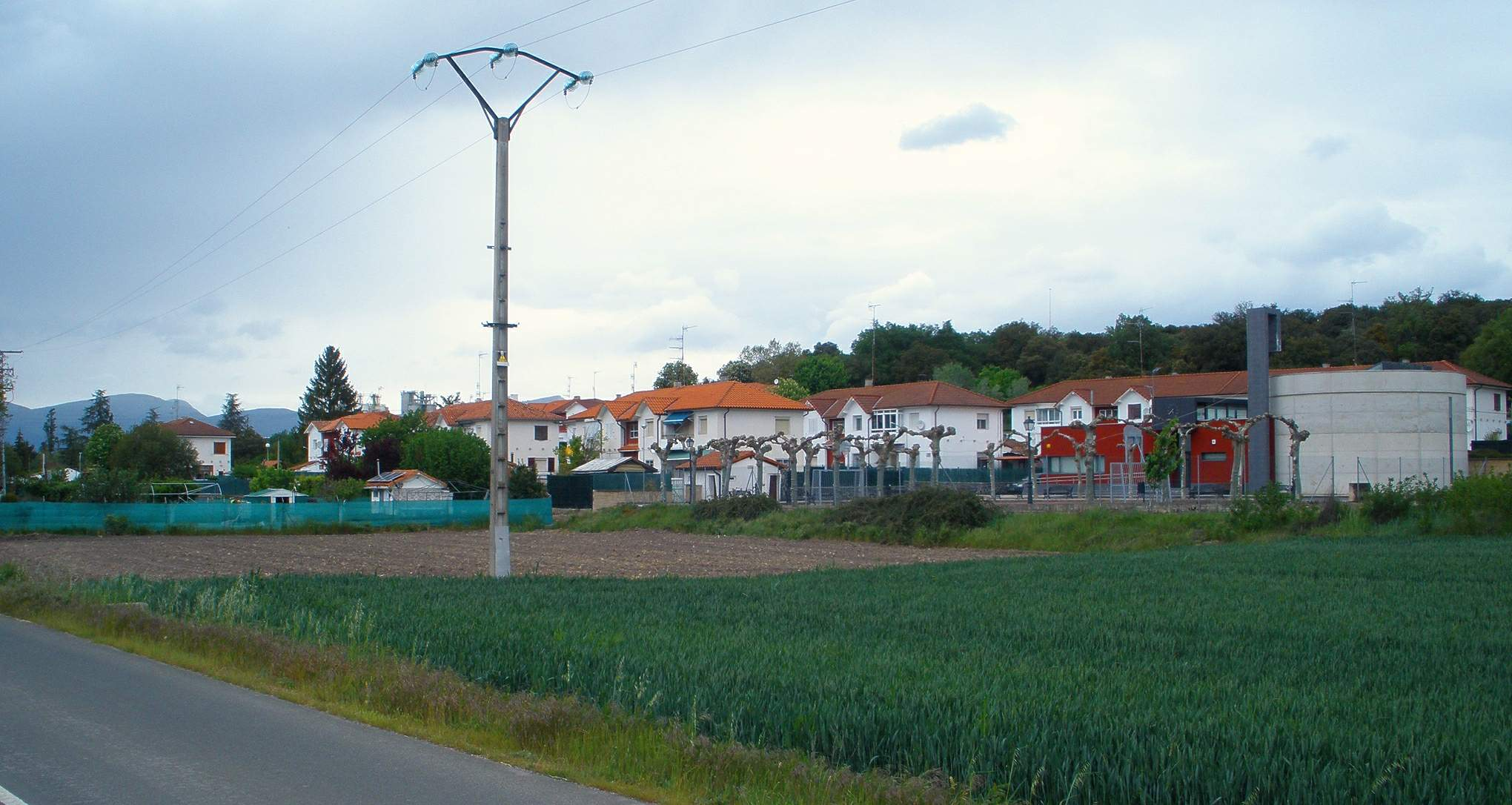
- Zubillaga (Lantarón, Àlava)

- Location within Álava Location within the Basque Country Location within Spain
- Coordinates: 42°42′N 3°00′W
- Country: Spain
- Autonomous community: Basque Country
- Province: Álava
- Comarca: Añana
- Municipality: Lantarón

Area
  - Total: 0.47 km^{2} (0.18 sq mi)
- Elevation: 460 m (1,510 ft)

Population (2023)
  - Total: 109
  - Density: 230/km^{2} (600/sq mi)
- Postal code: 01213

Zubillaga (Spanish pronunciation: [θuβiˈʝaɣa], Basque pronunciation: [s̻uβiʎaɣa]) is a village and concejo located in the municipality of Lantarón, in Álava province, Basque Country, Spain. It was established in the late 1940s as a neighborhood for the workers of a nearby chemical plant. It acquired its current name in 1989, when it was segregated from Comunión.
