= Caicedo de Yuso =

Hamlet in Álava, Spain

Caicedo Yuso
- Concejo
- Location within Álava Location within the Basque Country Location within Spain
- Coordinates: 42°45′12″N 2°59′48″W
- Country: Spain
- Autonomous community: Basque Country
- Province: Álava
- Comarca: Añana
- Municipality: Lantarón

Area
  - Total: 11.22 km^{2} (4.33 sq mi)
- Elevation: 585 m (1,919 ft)

Population (2023)
  - Total: 52
  - Density: 4.6/km^{2} (12/sq mi)
- Postal code: 01213

Caicedo Yuso (alternatively Caicedo de Yuso) is a hamlet and concejo in the municipality of Lantarón, in Álava province, Basque Country, Spain.

== See also ==
- Lake Arreo, also known as Caicedo-Yuso Lake
