= Sebastián Hurtado de Corcuera =

Spanish soldier and colonial official

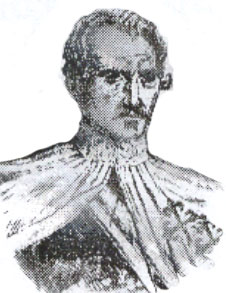
- Engraving "Governor Don Sebastián Hurtado de Corcuera" preserved in the Lopez Museum Collection, Philippines Heritage Library, Ayala Foundation, year 1875

22nd Governor and Captain General of the Philippines
- In office June 25, 1635 – August 11, 1644
- Monarch: Philip IV of Spain
- Valido: Count-Duke of Olivares; Luis de Haro
- Viceroy of New Spain: Lope Díez de Armendáriz, 1st Marquess of Cadreita; Diego López Pacheco, 7th Duke of Escalona; Juan de Palafox y Mendoza; García Sarmiento de Sotomayor, 2nd Count of Salvatierra
- Preceded by: Juan Salamanca
- Succeeded by: Diego Chacon

8th Captain General of Canary Islands
- In office December 4, 1659 – August 12, 1660
- Monarch: Philip IV
- Valido: Luis de Haro
- Preceded by: Alonso Dávila y Guzmán
- Succeeded by: Jerónimo de Benavente y Quiñones

23rd Governor of Panama
- In office 1632–1634
- Monarch: Philip IV
- Valido: Count-Duke of Olivares
- Viceroy of Peru: Luis Jerónimo de Cabrera
- Preceded by: Álvaro de Quiñones Osorio y Miranda
- Succeeded by: Enrique Enríquez de Sotomayor

Personal details
- Born: March 25, 1587 Berguenda, Spanish Empire
- Died: August 12, 1660 (aged 73) Tenerife, Spanish Empire

Military service
- Allegiance: Spanish Empire
- Battles/wars: 30 Years War 2nd Siege of Breda

Sebastián Hurtado de Corcuera Mendoza y Corcuera (Bergüenda, Álava, March 25, 1587 – Tenerife, Canarias, August 12, 1660) was a Spanish soldier and imperial official. From 1632 to 1634, he was governor of Panama. From June 25, 1635, to August 11, 1644, he was governor of the Philippines. And from 1659 to his death in 1660 he was governor of the Canary Islands. He is remembered as one of the two greatest Spanish military leaders in the Philippines.

== Background ==
Hurtado de Corcuera was born in Bergüenda, in the mountains of Álava, to Pedro Hurtado de Corcuera Mendoza y Montoya and María de Cocuera. He was a knight of the military Order of Alcántara. He served many years in the army in Flanders, where he was one of the Spanish military leaders in the Siege of Breda and a member of the Council of War. Thereafter, he was master-of-camp at the port of Callao, Peru, and captain general of cavalry in that Spanish province. From 1632 to 1634 he served as governor of Panama, at that time part of the Spanish Viceroyalty of Peru.

He arrived in Manila as governor and captain general of the Philippines and president of the Audiencia of Manila on June 25, 1635. He had sailed from Acapulco, New Spain, bringing with him a large reinforcement of soldiers from Peru and Panama. Including even the Genoese from Panama Viejo, who descend from the crusaders in the Republic of Genoa, a nation active in the Crusades. He replaced Juan Cerezo de Salamanca, who had been serving in an interim capacity since 1633. Cerezo had taken over from the Audiencia, which had governed for 12 months following the death in Manila of Governor Alonso Fajardo y Tenza.

== Dispute with Archbishop Guerrero ==
The same day that Hurtado arrived in Manila, the cabildo (city council) of that city confirmed Hernando Guerrero as Archbishop of Manila. Guerrero had been in the city, with a royal appointment to the position, since 1632, but had not taken possession of his office because the necessary papal bull had not been received. The cabildo had therefore refused him recognition. Almost immediately disputes arose between Governor Hurtado and Archbishop Guerrero.

This came to a head when a fugitive criminal claimed sanctuary in an Augustinian church in Manila. An artilleryman, Francisco de Nava, owned a female slave named María, with whom he was having illicit relations. The archbishop, upon learning this, ordered Nava to sell the slave. When he refused, she was taken from him and sold. The artilleryman soon tried to get the slave back, declaring he wanted to marry her. One day he saw the woman passing in a carriage with her new mistress, who happened to be the governor-general's wife. Going up to the carriage, he spoke to the woman, but she replied that she preferred to be the slave of another than his wife. Thereupon Nava, blind with anger, drew his dagger and killed her.

Before the astonished spectators could react, Nava ran to the Augustinian church, claiming the right of sanctuary. When Governor Hurtado heard of the events, he ordered the church surrounded and searched, the murderer seized. While soldiers surrounded the church and prevented anyone from escaping, they would not enter for fear of divine reprisal. Corcuera, upon hearing this, rode his horse directly into the threshold and, with about a dozen emboldened guardia civil, seized Nava, who was summarily tried and sentenced to death.

Officials of the archdiocese requested the release of the prisoner and his return to the church, but the governor refused to see them. The sentence was soon carried out (September 6, 1635), on a specially built gallows directly in front of the church where Nava had claimed sanctuary. This was the spot where Nava had killed María. The same day the archbishop ordered an interdict and suspension of religious services.

The commander of artillery, who had served as judge at Nava's trial, was subsequently condemned to a monetary fine, but appealed and was absolved. In the course of his case and appeals, evidence was given that the governor had stated before witnesses that if an order were given to him to arrest the pope, he would arrest him, and even drag him along by one foot.

The interdict was soon lifted. In this dispute the Jesuits sided with the governor, and the other orders with the secular archbishop.

A truce between the two parties was agreed to in January 1636, but it soon fell apart. In May of that year the governor ordered the archbishop exiled to Marivales Island, in Manila Bay. The cabildo (council) of the cathedral took over administration of the archdiocese. Within a month the archbishop was allowed to return, but under humiliating conditions.

== Administrative matters ==
Corcuera, in his annual report to the king dated June 30, 1636, reported the continuing bad state of the treasury. However, the pay warrants issued during the last year had been redeemed at one third their face value, thanks to a "voluntary" donation on the part of the holders. He urged that future governors of the colony be appointed in Spain, rather than in New Spain. In addition, he stated he had reorganized the armed forces and enrolled several companies of Pampango "Indians", whom he predicted would make good soldiers and be much cheaper than Spaniards. He further stated he had reorganized the civil and military payrolls with the aim of lowering their demands on the colonial treasury.

== War with the Moros ==
Moro raiders had harassed the Spanish and their allies for years. In 30 years, an estimated 20,000 persons were taken captive by the Moro pirates and sold in the markets of Batavia, Ternate, Amboina, Makassar, Java and Madras. A royal decree of 1636 ordered the pacification of Mindanao, where many of these raiders were based. On March 13, 1637, Hurtado de Corcuera left Zamboanga and landed at Lamitan to begin the assault. He had with him about 800 Peruvian men. They defeated the forces of Sultan Qudarat, capturing many cannons and killing many fighters. Qudarat himself narrowly escaped. Commentators of the time stressed the governor's personal bravery.

This victory gave rise to the Moro-Moro, a blood-and-thunder play which recounts the Spanish defeat of the Moros. The play has become an integral part of Filipino folk and religious festivals. Governor Hurtado became a hero and his return to Manila was attended with pomp and jubilation.

Qudarat took refuge at Lake Lanao, where he delivered a famous speech against the Spanish, exhorting his listeners to renounce submission and take up arms against the invaders. The speech was successful, and the Lake Moros soon recaptured the fort the Spanish had left behind. By 1637 Qudarat had extended his political influence over almost the whole of Mindanao.

On January 4, 1638, Governor Hurtado led another force, this time of 500 Peruvians and 1,000 native allies in 80 vessels, to invade the island of Sulu. Jolo, the capital of the island, was defended by about 4,000 fighters, including allies from Borneo and Makassar. After three months of heavy fighting and great losses on each side, neither side could claim victory. A truce was agreed on.

In 1639, he made an expedition near Lanao along with Christianized Boholano troops.

== Other events of his administration ==
The second Chinese insurrection began in November 1639, and lasted until March 1640. This conflict began with a rebellion of 3,000 Chinese laborers whom Corcuera impressed into farming rice in difficult conditions in the marsh of Calamba. By the end of the conflict some 24,000 Chinese had been killed, and the remaining 8,000 former rebels were taken prisoner and largely forced to work for the Spanish.

In agreement with the previous governor, and responding to the exigencies of war with the Sangleys, Hurtado de Corcuera had recommended to the Crown the abandoning of the Spanish fort on Formosa (Taiwan), as expensive and not useful. This became moot on August 24, 1642, when the Dutch captured it. Note, however, that the Dutch had badly failed to capture Spanish Formosa in 1641, and only succeeded the following year because Hurtado ordered most troops back to Manila, leaving the position lightly defended.

== After leaving office ==
Hurtado de Corcuera had made enemies during his administration, particularly among the clergy. With the arrival of his successor, Diego Fajardo Chacón, in 1644, his enemies had him brought to court. He received a substantial fine and was sent to prison. He spent five years in prison before he was finally freed by royal order. In 1651, he was named governor of Panama for a second time, but he declined. Later he was mayor of Córdoba and governor of the Asturias armed forces.

Finally he did accept the post of governor and captain general of the Canary Islands in 1659, serving there until his death the following year.

Political offices
Preceded by Juan Cerezo de Salamanca	Spanish Governor-General of the Philippines; June 25, 1635 – August 11, 1644	Succeeded by Diego Fajardo Chacón
