= Salsedo =

Salsedo may refer to:

- Andrea Salsedo, Italian anarchist
- Frank Salsedo, Native American actor

== See also ==
- Salcedo (disambiguation)
