= Molinilla =

Hamlet in Álava, Spain

- Concejo
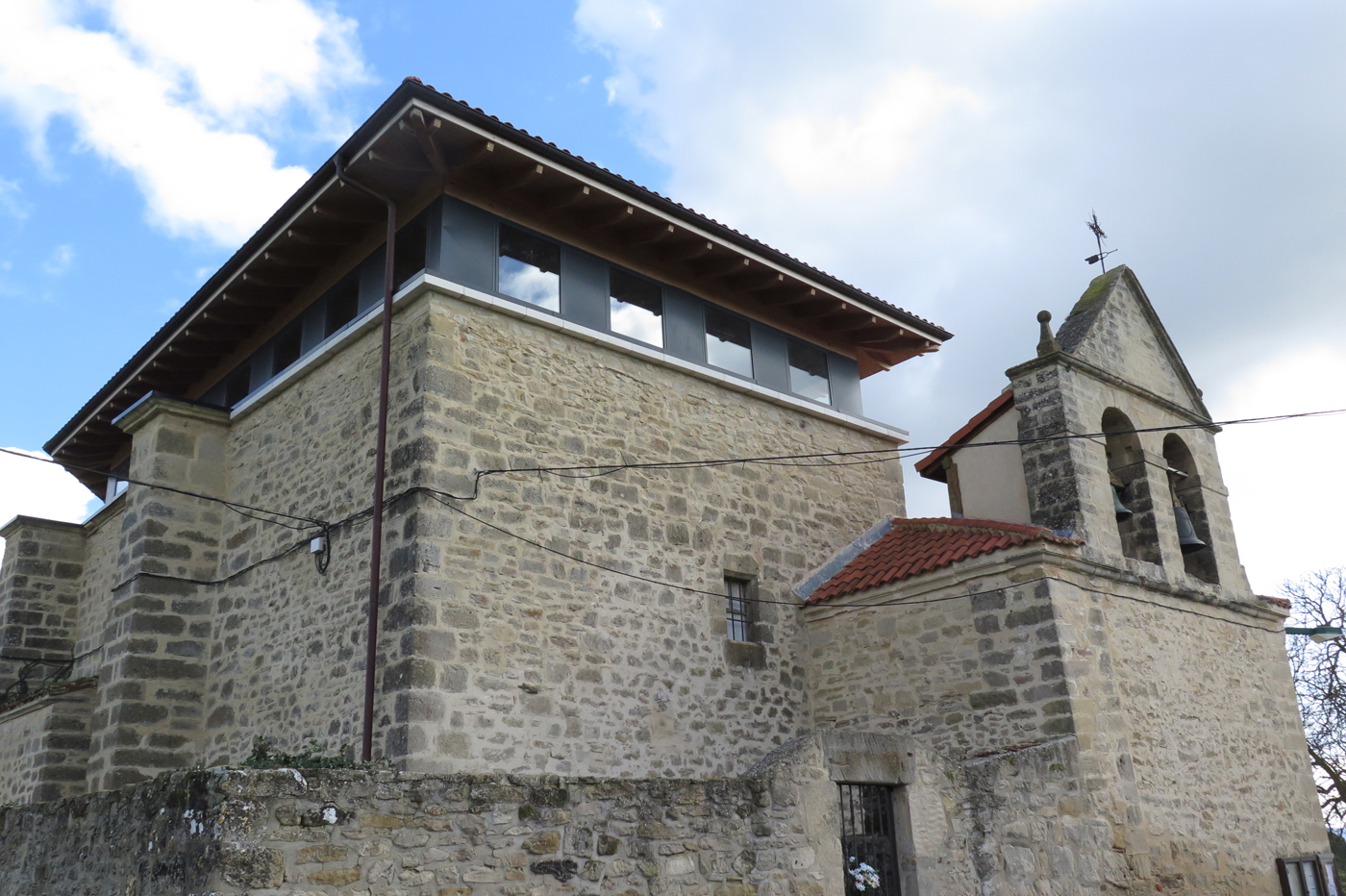
- The church of Molinilla

- Location within Álava Location within the Basque Country Location within Spain
- Coordinates: 42°45′13″N 2°58′05″W
- Country: Spain
- Autonomous community: Basque Country
- Province: Álava
- Comarca: Añana
- Municipality: Lantarón

Area
  - Total: 4.11 km^{2} (1.59 sq mi)
- Elevation: 605 m (1,985 ft)

Population (2023)
  - Total: 14
  - Density: 3.4/km^{2} (8.8/sq mi)
- Postal code: 01213

Molinilla is a hamlet and concejo in the municipality of Lantarón, in Álava province, Basque Country, Spain.
