= Juan Cerezo de Salamanca =

Spanish governor of the Philippines from 1633 to 1635

Governor-General of the Philippines
- In office August 2, 1633 – June 25, 1635
- Monarch: Philip IV of Spain
- Governor: (Viceroy of New Spain); Rodrigo Pacheco, 3rd Marquess of Cerralvo
- Preceded by: Lorenzo de Olaza
- Succeeded by: Sebastián Hurtado de Corcuera

Personal details
- Died: June 25, 1635

Juan Cerezo de Salamanca was interim Spanish governor of the Philippines from August 2, 1633 to June 25, 1635.

Cerezo de Salamanca was named interim governor of the Philippines by the viceroy of New Spain, Rodrigo Pacheco y Osorio, marqués de Cerralvo to replace Juan Niño de Tabora, who had died in office July 22, 1632. Cerezo sailed from Acapulco on April 5, 1633, arriving at the Philippines on July 8. Calm did not enable his flagship to reach Cavite, near Manila. Instead the new governor landed at Mindoro and was transported to the capital by an oared vessel. He arrived in Manila and took possession of the government on August 2, 1633.

== Report of August 14, 1633 ==
Although the Philippines were legally part of New Spain, that colony did not have direct control. Cerezo was appointed from New Spain, but he reported directly to the king, Philip IV. The governor sent his first report on August 14, 1633, less than two weeks after taking over the government. It consisted of three letters on different subjects, which included the following information.

The Spanish army in the Philippines consisted of 19 companies. Six of them garrisoned the city of Manila and another one the fort at Cavite. Six were in Ternate (the Moluccas) and three in Formosa (Taiwan). The islands of Oton, Cebu and Caraga each had one company. One company of volunteers was also stationed at Cebu. The Philippines, part of the colony of New Spain, extended from northern Formosa to the Moluccas, in what is now eastern Indonesia.

Cerezo reported that the former trade of the Philippines with China had been largely replaced by the Portuguese in Macao. The Portuguese then brought the Chinese goods to Manila for resale. Cerezo recommended that the Portuguese be prohibited from doing this, in order to restore some or all direct trade with China (despite Portugal and Spain's alliance. Philip IV was still king of both countries.)

Cerezo also mentioned royal Visitador (Inspector) Francisco de Rojas, who was in the middle of a two-year tour of inspection (1632–33) in the Philippines. Among other things, Rojas had suspended two of the four oidores (judges) of the Audiencia.

The treasury was still in debt, to the amount of 88,800 pesos owed to the inhabitants of Manila. Cerezo intended to repay those loans with the aid he had brought with him from New Spain.

The persecution of Christians was continuing in Japan. Cerezo reported that although the king had prohibited priests from entering Japan, that edict was very difficult to enforce because of their zeal to convert the country.

== Events up to the report of August 10, 1634 ==
A 1634 report by an anonymous writer gave an account of the situation with Christians in Japan. The emperor, who was suffering from leprosy, was said to have witnessed two signs which led him to transfer Christian priests from prison to his court. There he spoke with them, asking them to pray to their god that his leprosy be cured. The priests agreed to do this.

Cerezo sent his second annual report to the king on August 10, 1634. In this document he reported the arrest of three high treasury officials in Manila. They had refused to accept the new regulations issued by the recent royal inspector, Francisco de Rojas, and were appealing them to Spain. In the meantime they had refused to enforce them. Cerezo had them arrested to force compliance. Nevertheless, the governor also reported that some of the new regulations were impractical.

Four more companies of soldiers had been sent to the Philippines by the viceroy of New Spain. Anticipating possible trouble from the Dutch, Cerezo ordered repairs in the wall along the land side of Manila. This was done without funds from the treasury. The Chinese community (outside the city walls) was motivated "by suitable methods" to pay 40,000 pesos from their communal treasury.

The resupply ships for Terrenate from Manila (two galleons) had engaged a Dutch galleon trying to prevent their arrival there, but the Dutch ship was defeated.

A near revolt had occurred in Terrenate, occasioned by a priest banning the "crime against nature" and ordering the Spanish soldiers there who had engaged in it (said to be many of them) to seek absolution. The governor of Terrenate, Pedro de Heredia, had arrested 150 persons, burning and garroting eleven of them. Others had died in prison. The 40 survivors were sent back to Manila when the resupply ships returned. Governor Cerezo stated that although the charges against them were insufficiently substantiated, because of the danger of their infecting the rest of the army with their vice, they should nevertheless be punished with great severity.

== After the report of 1634 ==
In 1635, the Jesuits petitioned Cerezo to provide forces in Zamboanga so as to protect the missionaries and Christians that navigate the nearby seas. The governor granted their petition. Cerezo began the construction of the great fortress, Fuerza de San José, on June 23, 1635 in Zamboanga, on the Zamboanga Peninsula. The fort was intended to disrupt persistent Moro pirate attacks from Mindanao and Sulu on the Spanish on Visayas and Luzon. He was also focused on conquering Mindanao and Jolo.

Cerezo served as governor until June 25, 1635. He died in Nalfotan, Malaueg (now Poblacion, Rizal, Cagayan) and is buried in the atrium square in the Convent of Malaueg Church.

Political offices
Preceded by Juan Niño de Tabora	Spanish Governor-General of the Philippines; 1633–1635	Succeeded by Sebastián Hurtado de Corcuera
