= Turiso =

Hamlet in Álava, Spain

- Concejo
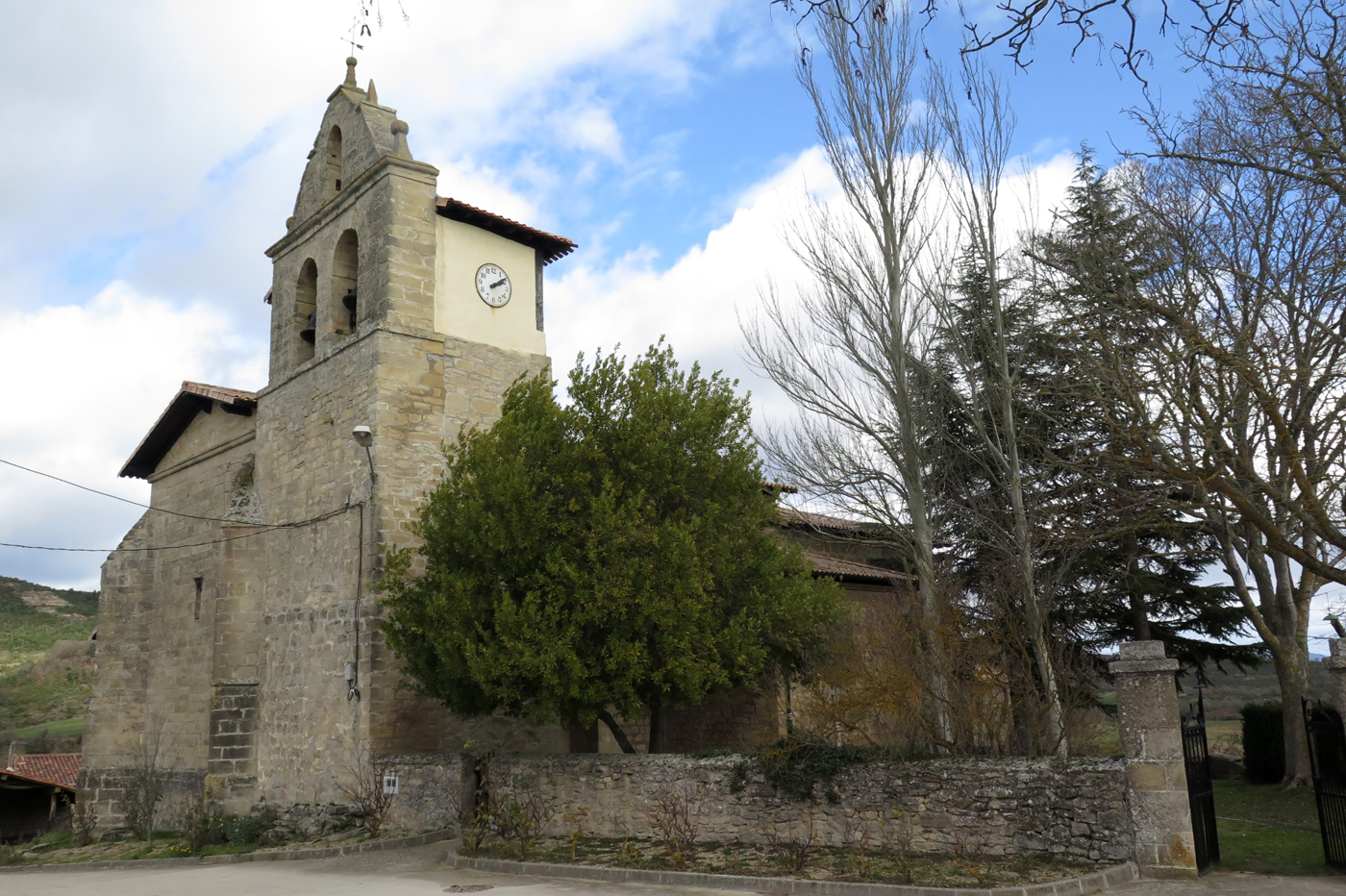
- The church of Turiso

- Location within Álava Location within the Basque Country Location within Spain
- Coordinates: 42°45′22″N 2°56′58″W
- Country: Spain
- Autonomous community: Basque Country
- Province: Álava
- Comarca: Añana
- Municipality: Lantarón

Area
  - Total: 7.44 km^{2} (2.87 sq mi)
- Elevation: 646 m (2,119 ft)

Population (2023)
  - Total: 38
  - Density: 5.1/km^{2} (13/sq mi)
- Postal code: 01213

Turiso is a hamlet and concejo in the municipality of Lantarón, in Álava province, Basque Country, Spain.
