= Salcedo =

Salcedo or Salzedo may refer to:

== Places ==
Dominican Republic

- Hermanas Mirabal Province (formerly called Salcedo)
- Salcedo, Dominican Republic, the capital of the Hermanas Mirabal Province

Ecuador

- Salcedo Canton, Cotopaxi Province
  Salcedo, Ecuador, Capital of the Salcedo Canton

Italy

- Salcedo, Italy, a commune in the province of Vicenza (Veneto)

Philippines

- Salcedo, Ilocos Sur, a municipality
- Salcedo, Eastern Samar, a municipality

Spain

- Salcedo, Álava, a village in Lantarón municipality

United States

- Salcedo, Missouri, an unincorporated community

== People ==
- Carlos Salzedo (1885–1961), French harpist, composer and conductor
- Domingo Salcedo (born 1983), Paraguayan footballer
- Doris Salcedo (born 1958), Colombian artist
- Felipe de Salcedo (c. 1564), Spanish conquistador
- Franchesca Salcedo (born 2002), Filipino actress
- José Antonio Salcedo, General of the Dominican Republic
- José Ulises Macías Salcedo (born 1940), Mexican archbishop
- Juan de Salcedo (1549–1576), Spanish commander in the Philippines
- Juan José de Vértiz y Salcedo (1719–1799), Spanish colonial politician
- Juan Manuel de Salcedo, the last Governor of Spanish Louisiana and father of Manuel María de Salcedo
- Juan Salcedo Jr. (1904–1988), Filipino Physician, and Scientists
- Leonard Salzedo (1921–2000), English composer and conductor
- Manuel María de Salcedo (1776-1813), Governor of Spanish Texas
- Mario Salcedo (born 1949 or 1950), American businessman, long-term passenger on Royal Caribbean International-branded cruise ships
- Miguel de la Quadra-Salcedo (1932–2016), Spanish reporter and Olympic athlete
- Santiago Salcedo (born 1981), Paraguayan footballer
- Carlos Salcedo (born 1993), Mexican footballer
