= Valido =

Valido is a term in Spanish for a political favourite, and also a surname. Notable people with the surname include:

- Alexis Valido (born 1976), Spanish volleyball player
- Agustín Valido (1914–1998), Argentine footballer
- Pedro Valido (born 1970), Portuguese footballer and coach
