= Comunión =

Village in Álava, Spain

Comunión/Komunioi
- Concejo
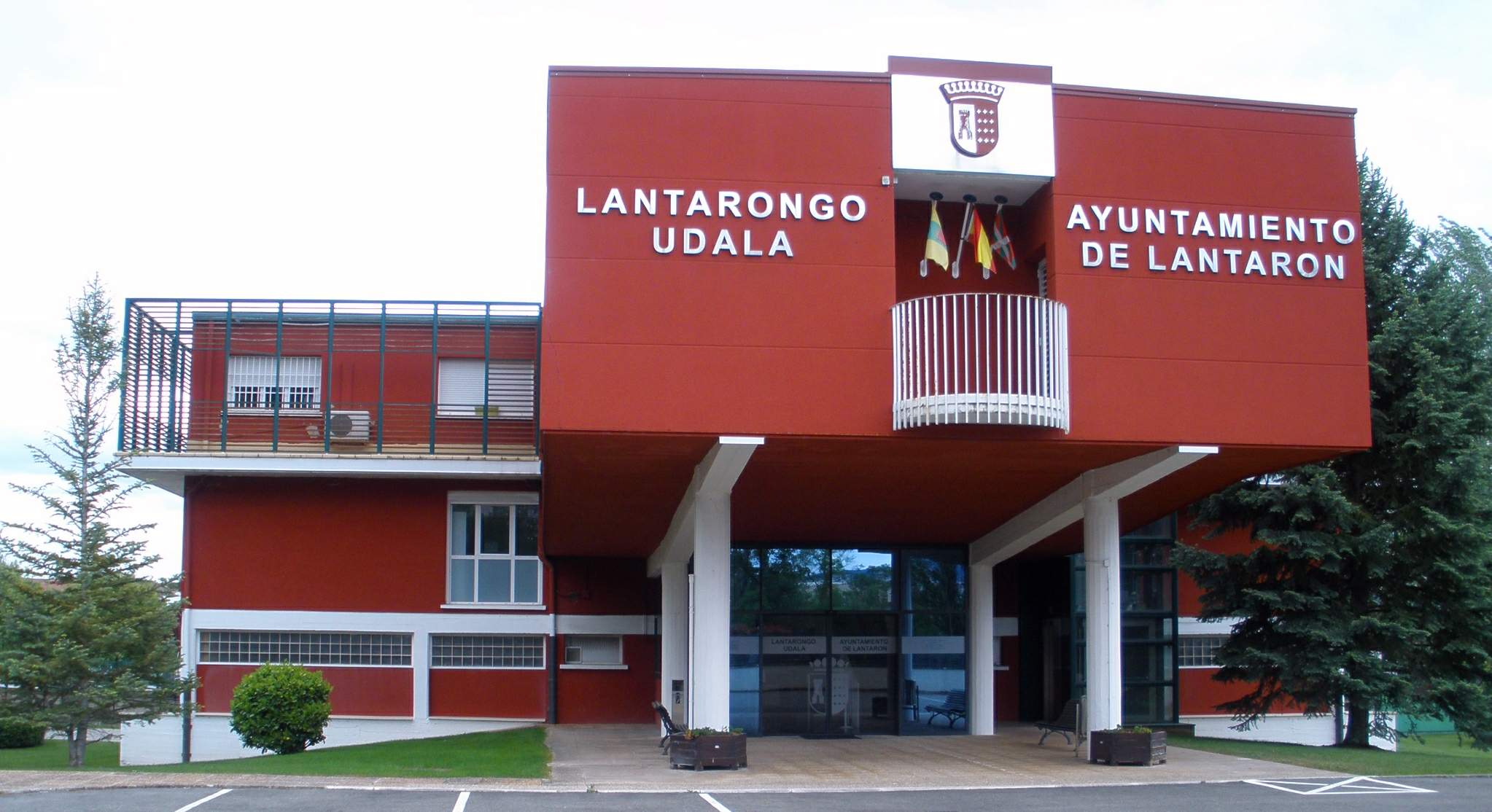
- Town hall of Lantarón in Comunión

- Location within Álava Location within the Basque Country Location within Spain
- Coordinates: 42.72°N 2.97°W
- Country: Spain
- Autonomous community: Basque Country
- Province: Álava
- Comarca: Añana
- Municipality: Lantarón

Area
  - Total: 5.36 km^{2} (2.07 sq mi)
- Elevation: 460 m (1,510 ft)

Population (2021)
  - Total: 85
  - Density: 16/km^{2} (41/sq mi)
- Postal code: 01213

Comunión (Spanish pronunciation: [komuˈnjon], Basque: Komunioi or Comunión) is a village and concejo located in the municipality of Lantarón, in Álava province, Basque Country, Spain. It is the capital of the municipality.
