= Puentelarrá =

Village in Álava, Spain

Puentelarrá/Larrazubi
- Concejo
- Coat of arms

- Location within Álava Location within the Basque Country Location within Spain
- Coordinates: 42°45′N 3°03′W
- Country: Spain
- Autonomous community: Basque Country
- Province: Álava
- Comarca: Añana
- Municipality: Lantarón

Area
  - Total: 0.52 km^{2} (0.20 sq mi)
- Elevation: 473 m (1,552 ft)

Population (2023)
  - Total: 202
  - Density: 390/km^{2} (1,000/sq mi)
- Postal code: 01423

Puentelarrá (Spanish pronunciation: [pwentelaˈra]) or Larrazubi (Basque pronunciation: [laras̻uβi]) is a village and concejo in the municipality of Lantarón, in Álava province, Basque Country, Spain.
