= Sobrón =

Hamlet in Álava, Spain

- Concejo
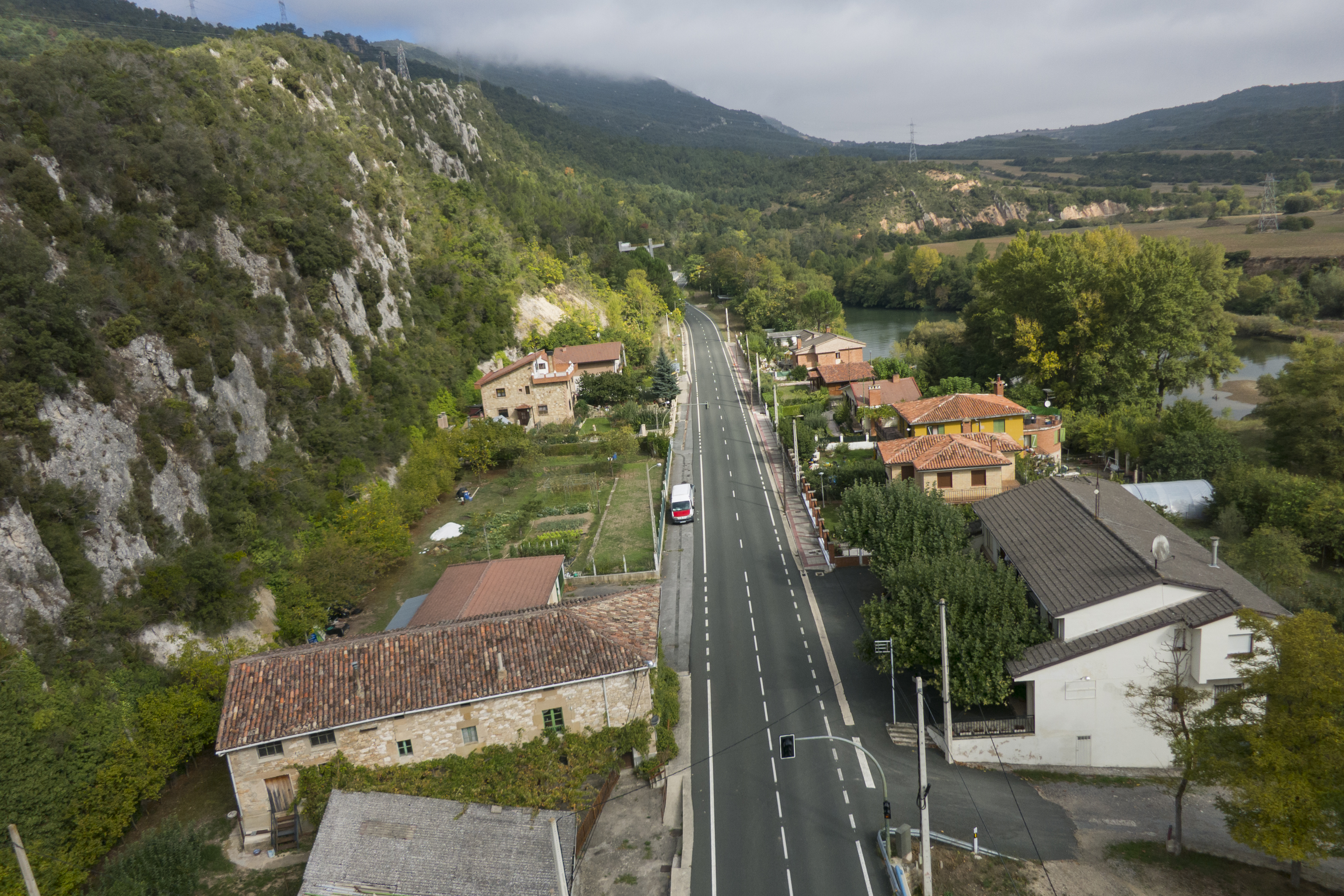

- Location within Álava Location within the Basque Country Location within Spain
- Coordinates: 42°46′N 3°07′W
- Country: Spain
- Autonomous community: Basque Country
- Province: Álava
- Comarca: Añana
- Municipality: Lantarón

Area
  - Total: 11.54 km^{2} (4.46 sq mi)
- Elevation: 699 m (2,293 ft)

Population (2023)
  - Total: 55
  - Density: 4.8/km^{2} (12/sq mi)
- Postal code: 01423

Sobrón is a hamlet and concejo in the municipality of Lantarón, in Álava province, Basque Country, Spain. Sobrón was the site of a spa resort between 1858 and 1936. Despite attempts to reopen it, it remains abandoned.
