= Salcedo, Álava =

Hamlet in Álava, Spain

Salcedo
- Concejo
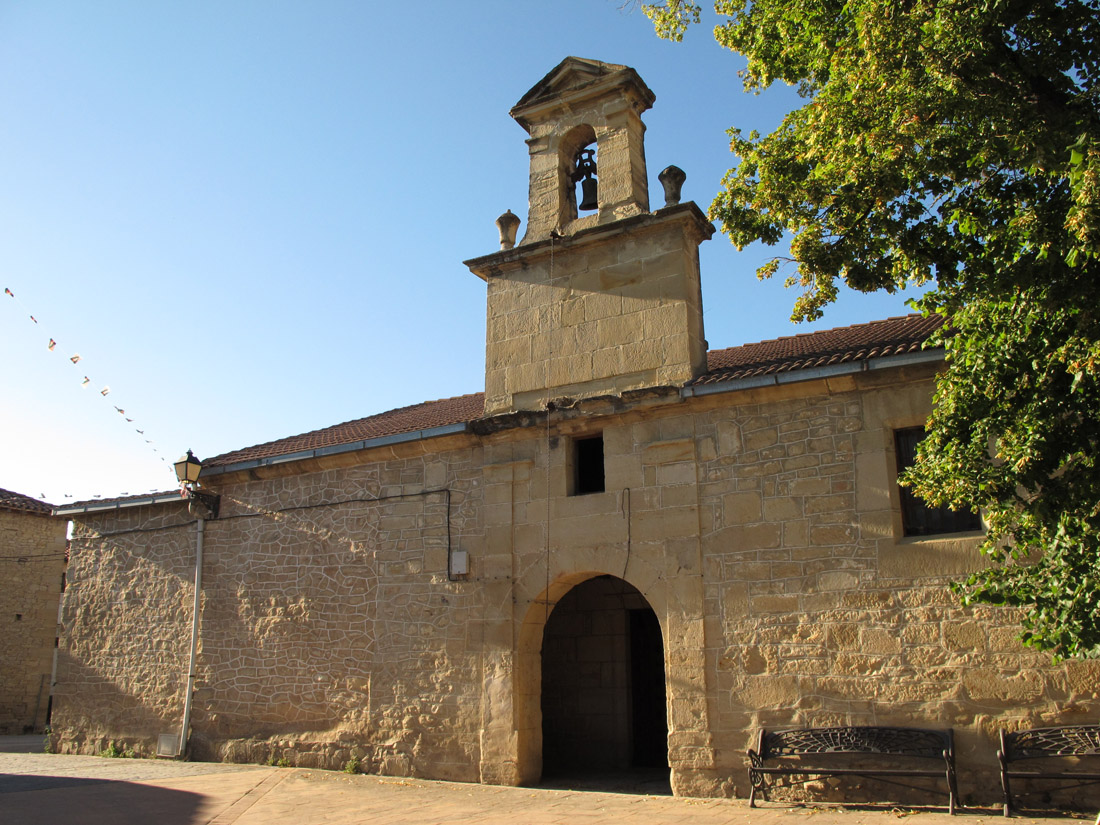
- The church of Salcedo

- Location within Álava Location within the Basque Country Location within Spain
- Coordinates: 42°44′04″N 2°57′49″W
- Country: Spain
- Autonomous community: Basque Country
- Province: Álava
- Comarca: Añana
- Municipality: Lantarón

Area
  - Total: 5.27 km^{2} (2.03 sq mi)
- Elevation: 531 m (1,742 ft)

Population (2023)
  - Total: 112
  - Density: 21.3/km^{2} (55.0/sq mi)
- Postal code: 01213

Salcedo is a hamlet and concejo in the municipality of Lantarón, in Álava province, Basque Country, Spain.
