= Lake Arreo =

Lake in the Basque Country, Spain

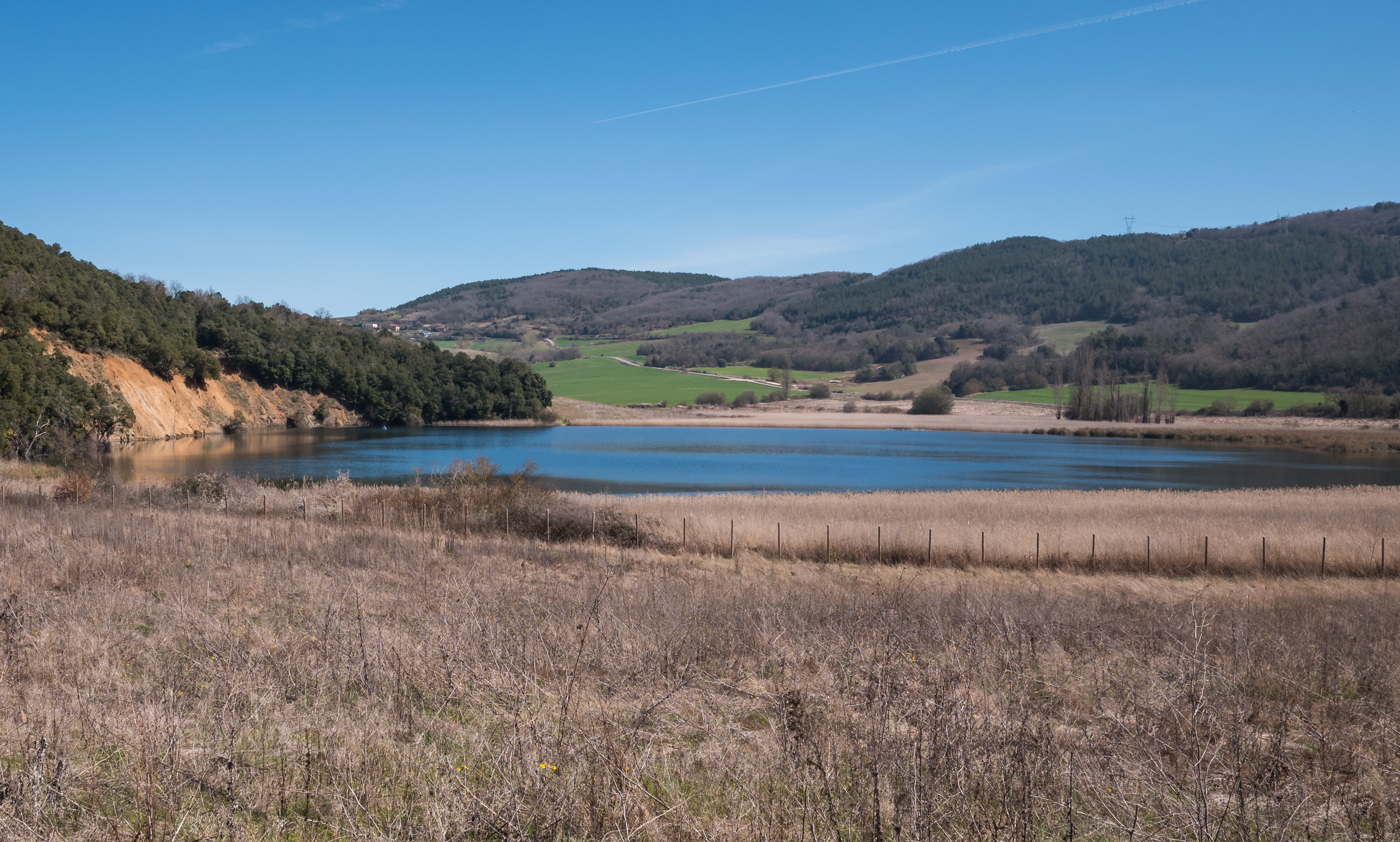
- View of the lake

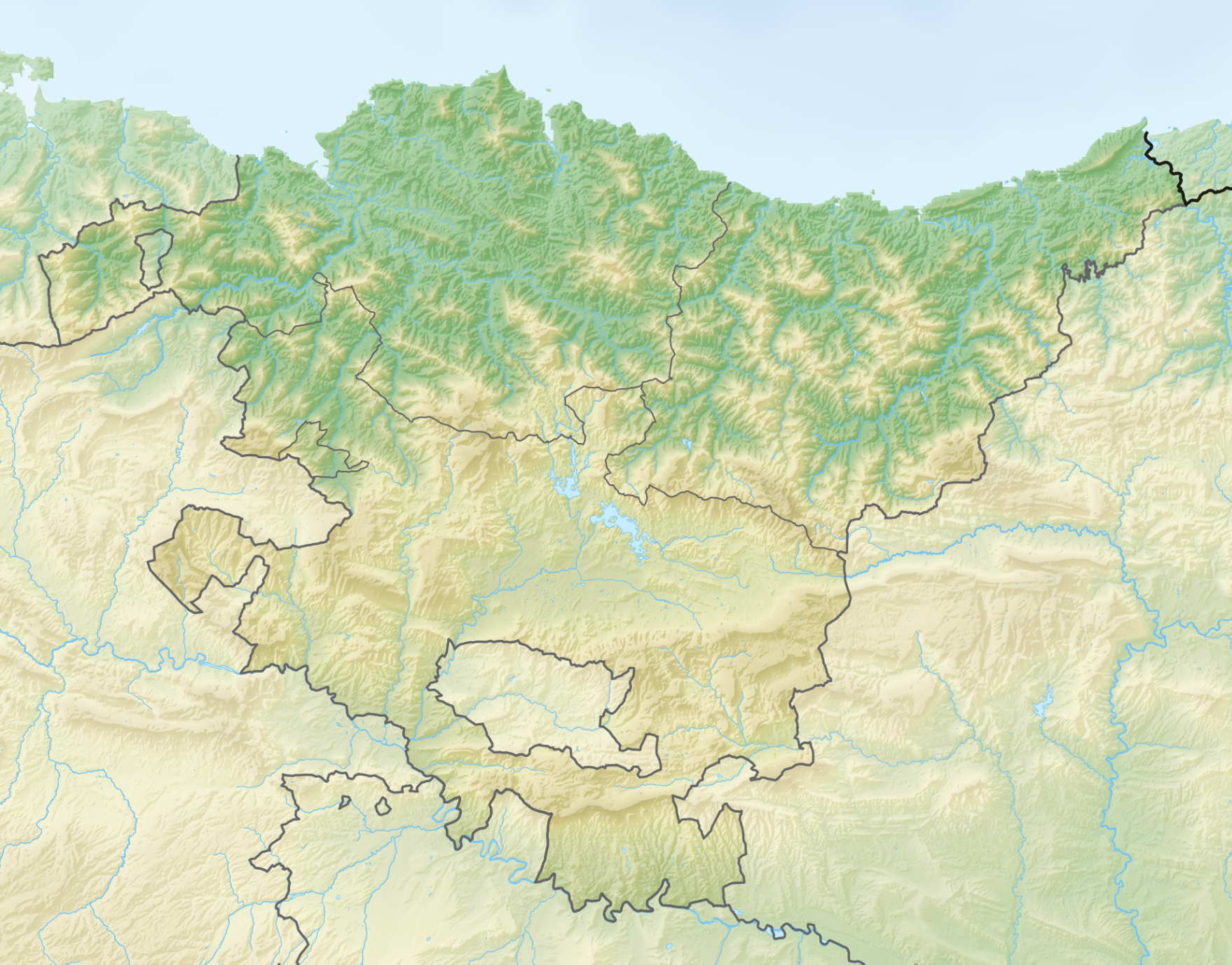
- Location within the Basque Country Location within Spain
- Location: Lantarón, Álava, Basque Country, Spain
- Coordinates: 42.77875°N 2.98933°W
- Type: Lake
- Max. length: 338 m (1,109 ft)
- Max. width: 246 m (807 ft)
- Surface area: 6.57 ha (16.2 acres)
- Max. depth: 24.8 m (81 ft)
- Water volume: 0.35 hm^{3} (280 acre⋅ft)

Ramsar Wetland
- Designated: 24 October 2002
- Part of: Lago de Caicedo-Yuso y Salinas de Añana
- Reference no.: 1258

Natura 2000 site (SAC)
- Official name: Caicedo Yuso eta Arreoko lakua / Lago de Caicedo Yuso y Arreo
- Designated: May 2016
- Reference no.: ES2110007
- Area: 1.48 km^{2} (0.57 sq mi)

Lake Arreo (Basque: Arreoko aintzira, Spanish: Lago de Arreo), also known as the Caicedo-Yuso Lake (Basque: Caicedo-Yusoko aintzira, Spanish: Lago de Caicedo-Yuso) is a lake in the province of Álava, Basque Country, Spain. With a surface of 6.5 ha (16 acres), it is the only natural lake in the Basque Country.

== Flora and fauna ==
Hydrophytes found within the lake itself include Myriophyllum verticillatum, M. spicatum, Ceratophyllum submersum, Potamogeton pectinatus, P. coloratus, P. gramineus, P. nodosus, P. pusillus, P. lucens, Ranunculus trichophyllus, R. peltatus baudoti, Polygonum amphibium and Utricularia australis. The shallow shores of the lake are home to plants species including Schoenoplectus lacustris, common reed, Typha angustifolia, Cladium mariscus. Due to the existence of a salt spring near the lake, species found in saline areas such as Juncus acutus, Juncus gerardi, Spergularia marina, Parapholis incurva and Plantago coronopus are also present.

Mallards, Eurasian coots and great crested grebes have been observed at the site. According to a study by the Basque Water Agency, four species of fish are present in the lake. Only the tench is autochthonous; while the largemouth bass, Eurasian carp and the pumpkinseed are introduced.
