= Fontecha =

Village in Basque Country, Spain

- Concejo
- Location within Álava Location within the Basque Country Location within Spain
- Coordinates: 42.745445°N 3.027004°W
- Country: Spain
- Autonomous community: Basque Country
- Province: Álava
- Comarca: Añana
- Municipality: Lantarón

Area
  - Total: 7.04 km^{2} (2.72 sq mi)
- Elevation: 498 m (1,634 ft)

Population (2022)
  - Total: 120
  - Density: 17/km^{2} (44/sq mi)
- Postal code: 01423

Fontecha (Spanish pronunciation: [fonˈtetʃa]) is a village and concejo located in the municipality of Lantarón, in Álava province, Basque Country, Spain.
