= Alcedo, Álava =

Hamlet in Álava, Spain

Alcedo
- Concejo
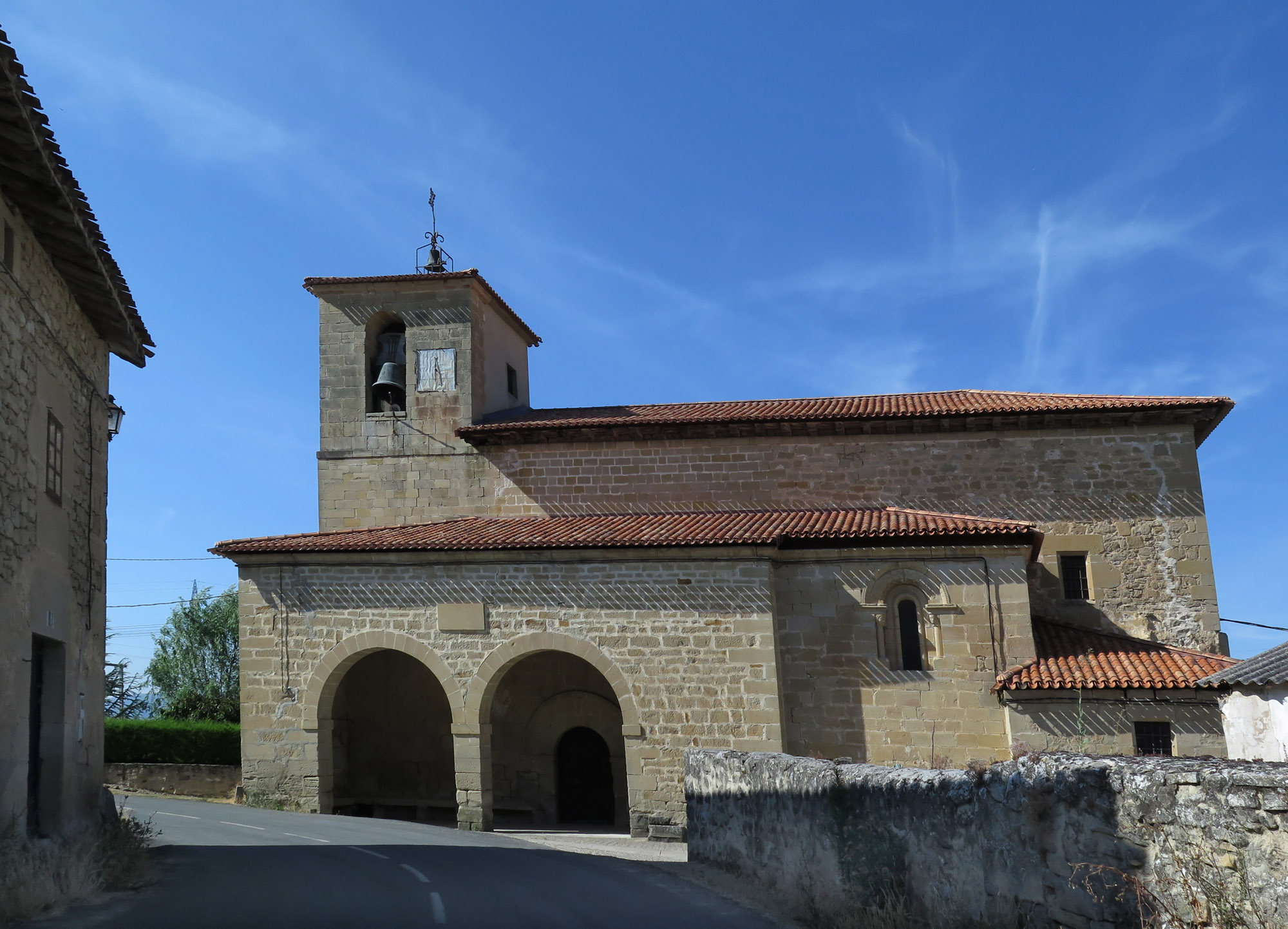
- The church of Alcedo

- Location within Álava Location within the Basque Country Location within Spain
- Coordinates: 42°46′33″N 3°01′32″W
- Country: Spain
- Autonomous community: Basque Country
- Province: Álava
- Comarca: Añana
- Municipality: Lantarón

Area
  - Total: 6.03 km^{2} (2.33 sq mi)
- Elevation: 559 m (1,834 ft)

Population (2023)
  - Total: 26
  - Density: 4.3/km^{2} (11/sq mi)
- Postal code: 01423

Alcedo is a hamlet and concejo in the municipality of Lantarón, in Álava province, Basque Country, Spain.
