= Lantarón =

- Municipality
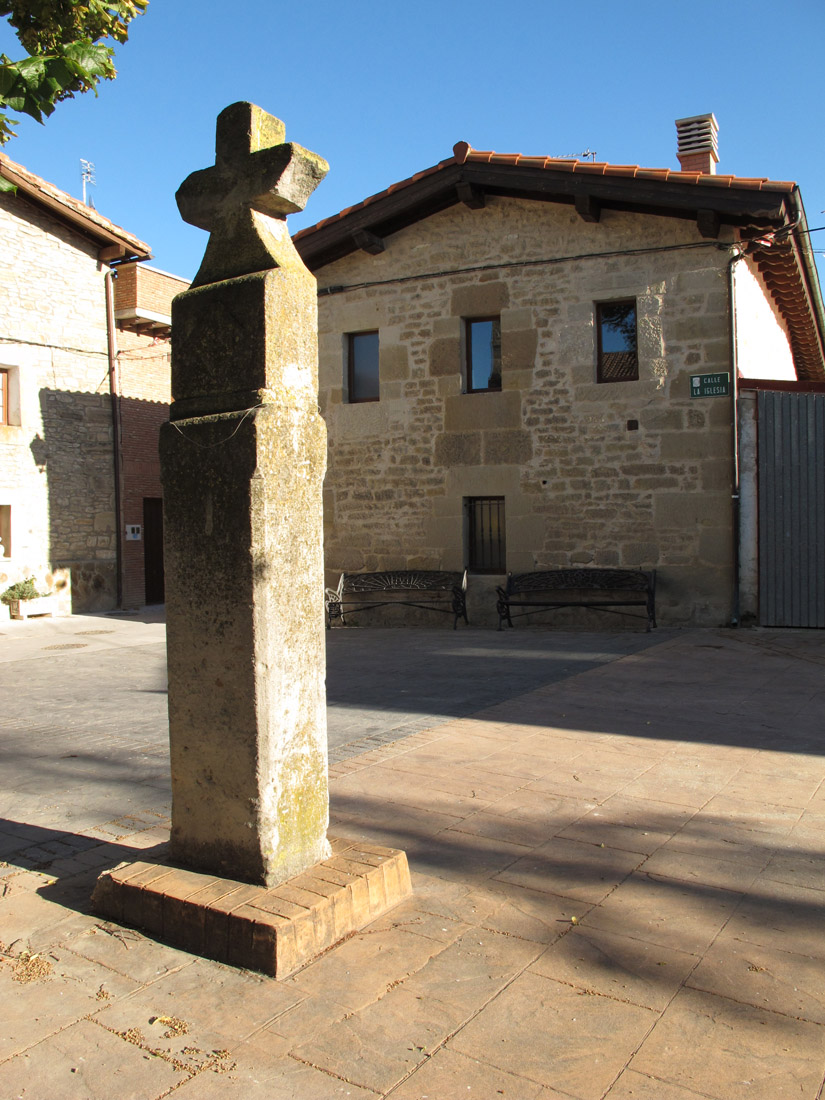

- Flag Coat of arms

- Location of Lantarón within the Basque Country Location of Lantarón within Spain
- Coordinates: 42°43′N 02°58′W
- Country: Spain
- Autonomous Community: Basque Country
- Province: Álava
- Comarca: Cuadrilla de Añana

Government
  - Mayor: Francisco Javier Uriarte Jairo

Area
  - Total: 61.77 km^{2} (23.85 sq mi)
- Elevation (AMSL): 488 m (1,601 ft)

Population (2025-01-01)
  - Total: 929
  - Density: 15.0/km^{2} (39.0/sq mi)
- Time zone: UTC+1 (CET)
  - Summer (DST): UTC+2 (CEST (GMT +2))
- Postal code: 01213
- Website: www.lantaron.org/

Lantarón is a town and municipality located in the province of Álava, in the Basque Country, northern Spain.

== Villages ==
- Alcedo
- Bergüenda (Bergonda)
- Caicedo de Yuso
- Comunión
- Fontecha
- Leciñana del Camino (Leziñana)
- Molinilla
- Puentelarrá (Larrazubi)
- Salcedo
- Sobrón
- Turiso
- Zubillaga

== History ==
In the Middle Ages, Lantarón was the site of a fortress on the eastern edge of the Kingdom of León. In the ninth and tenth centuries the fortress was commanded by a series of counts, often in conjunction with that of Cerezo: Gonzalo Téllez (897), Munio Vélaz (919), Fernando Díaz (923) and Álvaro Herraméliz (929).
